= City of Geraldton-Greenough =

Former local government area in Western Australia

Coordinates: 28°46′44″S 114°36′25″E

City of Geraldton Greenough
- Local government area
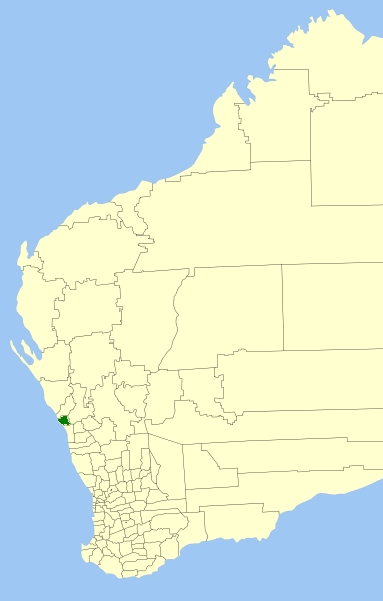
- Location in Western Australia

- Country: Australia
- State: Western Australia
- Region: Mid West
- Established: 2007
- Abolished: 2011
- Council seat: Geraldton

Area
  - Total: 1,798.3 km^{2} (694.3 sq mi)

Population
  - Total: 39,404 (2011)
  - Density: 21.9118/km^{2} (56.7513/sq mi)
LGAs around City of Geraldton Greenough
Indian Ocean	Chapman Valley	Mullewa
Indian Ocean	City of Geraldton Greenough	Mullewa
Indian Ocean	Irwin	Irwin

The City of Geraldton-Greenough was a local government area in the Mid West region of Western Australia, 424 kilometres (263 mi) north of the state capital, Perth on the Indian Ocean. It covered an area of 1,798.3 square kilometres (694.3 sq mi), and its seat of government was the town of Geraldton.

In existence for exactly four years, it was established on 1 July 2007 through the amalgamation of the former City of Geraldton and Shire of Greenough, and itself amalgamated with the Shire of Mullewa into the City of Greater Geraldton on 1 July 2011.

== History ==
A recommendation was made to the Minister for Local Government by the Local Government Advisory Board in August 2006 to amalgamate the Shire of Greenough with the City of Geraldton.

The Greenough electors successfully petitioned for a referendum to determine whether amalgamation should proceed. This was held on 2 December 2006, and with a participation rate of 28.74%, a majority of 80% voted against the proposal. However, under the Local Government Act 1995 (clause 10 of Schedule 2.1) as the vote did not attract 50% of registered voters, it did not meet the requirements for a valid poll.

The councillors of both local government authorities resigned at the end of April 2007, and elections for the new local government took place in October 2007. The entity was managed by three commissioners in the interim, headed by Jeff Carr, who was the state member for Geraldton from 1974 until 1991.

Throughout 2010 and 2011 negotiations were held between the City of Geraldton-Greenough and the Shire of Mullewa as to whether the two entities should merge. After a long period of negotiations the entities decided to merge. A poll was requested by both communities and was held on 16 April 2011. 83.24% of voters voted against the merger in Mullewa, with 72.39% of voters against the merger in Geraldton-Greenough. However, both polls failed to reach the minimum 50% turnout required to be a valid poll. The two entities will merge on 1 July 2011 to become the City of Greater Geraldton.

=== Abolishment ===
The Liberal government announced its intentions to amalgamate local governments around the state in line with reforms undertaken elsewhere in Australia. Ultimately, the plan did not succeed, but a number of local governments commenced negotiations for voluntary mergers. One such group included the City, the Shire of Chapman Valley and the Shire of Mullewa. In February 2010, Chapman Valley decided not to proceed, citing community opposition. In December 2010, the Local Government Advisory Board approved the merger. Polls were held in both municipalities, with 72.61% of voters in Geraldton-Greenough and 83.23% of voters in Mullewa voting against the merger. However, both polls failed to reach the minimum 50% required to be a valid poll, and the City of Greater Geraldton came into being on 1 July 2011.

== Wards ==
The City was divided into six wards, each with two councillors. The Local Government Advisory Board recommended that the mayor be elected from amongst the councillors, as opposed to a directly elected mayor such as the former City of Geraldton.

- Champion Bay Ward – contains Beresford, Spalding and Webberton
- Chapman Ward – contains Bluff Point, Drummond Cove, Glenfield, Sunset Beach and Waggrakine
- Port Ward – contains Geraldton itself, Beachlands and Mahomets Flats
- Tarcoola Ward – contains Mount Tarcoola, Tarcoola Beach and Wandina
- Willcock Ward – contains Karloo, Rangeway, Wonthella and part of Utakarra
- Hills Ward – contains the majority of the City's land area, and includes the suburbs of Strathalbyn and Woorree

== Suburbs ==
- Beachlands
- Beresford
- Bluff Point
- Deepdale
- Geraldton
- Glenfield
- Karloo
- Mahomets Flats
- Moresby
- Mount Tarcoola
- Narngulu
- Rangeway
- Rudds Gully
- Spalding
- Strathalbyn
- Sunset Beach
- Tarcoola Beach
- Utakarra
- Waggrakine
- Wandina
- Webberton
- West End
- Wonthella
- Woorree

== Towns ==
- Cape Burney
- Drummond Cove
- Eradu
- Greenough
- Kojarena
- Minnenooka
- Moonyoonooka
- Walkaway
- Wicherina

== Population ==
The historic populations of the area which formed Geraldton-Greenough were:

Year	Population	Geraldton	Greenough
1921	5,549	4,174	1,375
1933	6,540	4,984	1,556
1947	7,539	5,972	1,567
1954	9,680	8,309	1,371
1961	12,215	10,894	1,321
1966	13,719	12,125	1,594
1971	17,038	15,118	1,920
1976	20,642	17,663	2,979
1981	23,708	19,096	4,612
1986	25,721	19,923	5,798
1991	28,147	20,521	7,626
1996	30,061	19,724	10,337
2001	31,106	19,179	11,927
2006	32,461	18,916	13,545

== See also ==
- List of mayors of Geraldton
