= Shire of Greenough =

Former local government area in Western Australia

Coordinates: 28°46′48″S 114°38′46″E

Shire of Greenough Western Australia
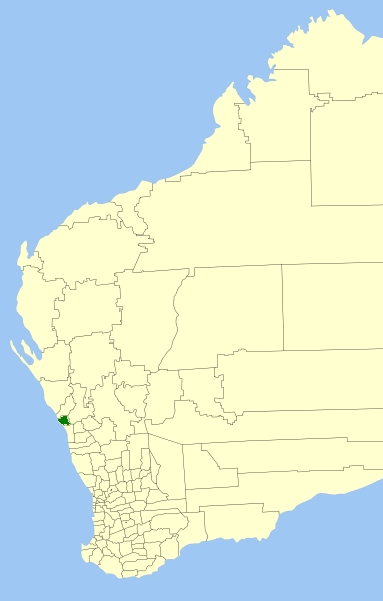
- Location in Western Australia
- Population: 15,394 (2007)
  - Density: 8.7865/km^{2} (22.7570/sq mi)
- Established: 1951
- Abolished: 2007
- Area: 1,752.0 km^{2} (676.5 sq mi)
- Mayor: E J (John) Sewell
- Council seat: Utakarra
- Region: Mid West
- State electorate(s): Greenough
- Federal division(s): O'Connor
LGAs around Shire of Greenough:
Geraldton	Chapman Valley	Mullewa
Indian Ocean	Shire of Greenough	Mullewa
Indian Ocean	Irwin	Irwin

The Shire of Greenough was a local government area in the Mid West region of Western Australia, 420 kilometres (261 mi) north of the state capital, Perth surrounding the city of Geraldton. The Shire covered an area of 1,752 square kilometres (676.5 sq mi), and its seat of government was the outer Geraldton suburb of Utakarra.

Historically a rural area, with the growth of Geraldton in recent years as a port and city, the areas of the Shire closest to Geraldton became increasingly urbanised. The council amalgamated with the City of Geraldton in 2007 to form the City of Geraldton-Greenough. On 1 July 2011 it became part of the City of Greater Geraldton.

== History ==
The Shire of Greenough originated as the Geraldton-Greenough Road District, which was established on 21 December 1951 with the amalgamation of the Geraldton Road District and the Greenough Road District. It was declared a shire as the Shire of Geraldton-Greenough with effect from 1 July 1961 following the passage of the Local Government Act 1960, which reformed all remaining road districts into shires. It was renamed the Shire of Greenough on 19 March 1965.

It ceased to exist in 2007 when it merged with the City of Geraldton to form the City of Geraldton-Greenough.

== Amalgamation ==
A recommendation was made to the Minister for Local Government by the Local Government Advisory Board in August 2006 to amalgamate the Shire of Greenough with the City of Geraldton.

The Greenough electors successfully petitioned for a referendum to determine whether amalgamation should proceed. This was held on 2 December 2006, and with a participation rate of 28.74%, a majority of 80% voted against the proposal. However, under the Local Government Act 1995 (clause 10 of Schedule 2.1) as the vote did not attract 50% of registered voters, it did not meet the requirements for a valid poll.

The councillors of both local government authorities resigned at the end of April 2007, and the first elections for new councillors took place in October 2007.

== Wards ==
The Shire was divided into four wards until 2005 – West and Tarcoola Wards, each with four councillors, and North and South wards, each with two councillors. In May 2005, due to a redistribution of boundaries, the Central and Wandina Wards, each with four councillors, and the Chapman North Ward with three councillors were created.

== Towns and localities ==
Localities/suburbs:

- Deepdale
- Glenfield
- Karloo
- Moresby
- Mount Tarcoola (split with City of Geraldton)
- Narngulu
- Rudds Gully
- Strathalbyn
- Tarcoola Beach
- Utakarra (split with City of Geraldton)
- Waggrakine
- Wandina
- Woorree

Towns:

- Cape Burney
- Drummond Cove
- Eradu
- Greenough
- Kojarena
- Minnenooka
- Moonyoonooka
- Walkaway
- Wicherina

== Population ==
Year	Population
1921	1,375
1933	1,556
1947	1,567
1954	1,371
1961	1,321
1966	1,594
1971	1,920
1976	2,979
1981	4,612
1986	5,798
1991	7,626
1996	10,337
2001	11,927
2006	13,545
