= City of Geraldton =

Former local government area in Western Australia

Coordinates: 28°46′44″S 114°36′25″E

City of Geraldton (former)
- Local government area
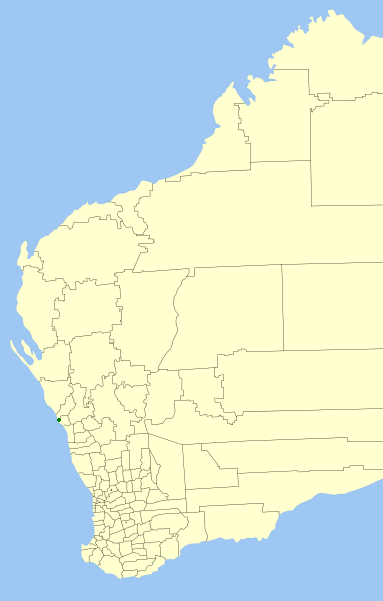
- Location in Western Australia

- Country: Australia
- State: Western Australia
- Region: Mid West
- Established: 1871
- Abolished: 2007
- Council seat: Geraldton

Government
  - Mayor: Vickie Petersen
  - State electorate: Geraldton
  - Federal division: Durack

Area
  - Total: 46.3 km^{2} (17.9 sq mi)

Population
  - Total: 20,333 (2007)
  - Density: 439.2/km^{2} (1,137.4/sq mi)
LGAs around City of Geraldton (former)
Indian Ocean	Chapman Valley	Greenough
Indian Ocean	City of Geraldton (former)	Greenough
Indian Ocean	Greenough	Greenough

The City of Geraldton was a local government area in the Mid West region of Western Australia, 424 kilometres (263 mi) north of the state capital, Perth on the Indian Ocean. The City covered an area of 46.3 square kilometres (17.9 sq mi), and its seat of government was the town of Geraldton.

The council amalgamated with the Shire of Greenough, which contained Geraldton's industrial and outer suburban areas, in 2007 to form the City of Geraldton-Greenough. The area is now, as of 1 July 2011, part of the City of Greater Geraldton.

== History ==
The City of Geraldton was first established as the Municipality of Geraldton on 21 February 1871. It gained town status as the Town of Geraldton on 1 July 1961 following the enactment of the Local Government Act 1960. It assumed its final name when it attained city status on 22 April 1988.

== Amalgamation ==
A recommendation was made to the Minister for Local Government by the Local Government Advisory Board in August 2006 to amalgamate the City of Geraldton with the neighbouring Shire of Greenough.

The Greenough electors successfully petitioned for a referendum to determine whether amalgamation should proceed. This was held on 2 December 2006, and with a participation rate of 28.74%, a majority of 80% voted against the proposal. However, under the Local Government Act 1995 (clause 10 of Schedule 2.1) as the vote did not attract 50% of registered voters, it did not meet the requirements for a valid poll.

The councillors of both local government authorities resigned at the end of April 2007, and the first elections were held in October 2007.

== Wards ==
The City had not been divided into wards since the 1970s, and the twelve councillors represented all electors. The mayor was directly elected.

== Suburbs ==
- Beachlands
- Beresford
- Bluff Point
- Geraldton
- Mahomets Flats
- Mount Tarcoola (split with Shire of Greenough)
- Rangeway
- Spalding
- Sunset Beach
- Utakarra (split with Shire of Greenough)
- Webberton
- West End
- Wonthella

== Population ==
Year	Population
1921	4,174
1933	4,984
1947	5,972
1954	8,309
1961	10,894
1966	12,125
1971	15,118
1976	17,663
1981	19,096
1986	19,923
1991	20,521
1996	19,724
2001	19,179
2006	18,916
