= Great Northern Football League =

- Founded: 1961
- Most recent champion: Brigades (2026)
- Website: www.gnfl.com.au

The Great Northern Football League is an Australian rules football league centred on the city of Geraldton in Western Australia, which was formed in 1961 as a merger of the Geraldton Football Association and the Northampton-Upper Chapman Football Association. It currently includes four clubs from Geraldton (Brigades, Railway, Rover and Towns) and one each from Mullewa, Northampton and Nabawa (Chapman Valley).

== Clubs ==
=== Locations ===
Locations of the 2025 Eastern Districts FL clubs

=== Current ===
Club	Colours	Nickname	Home Ground	Former League	Est.	Years in GNFL	Premierships	
Club	Colours	Nickname	Home Ground	Former League	Est.	Years in GNFL	Total	Years
Brigades		Hawks	GBSC Sports Park, Spalding	GNFA	1909	1961–	9	1962, 1971, 1986, 1988, 2015, 2018, 2021, 2025, 2026
Chapman Valley		Royals	Mazzuchelli Oval, Nabawa	–	1961	1961–	5	1972, 1973, 1974, 1992, 2024
Mullewa		Saints	Mullewa Town Oval, Mullewa	–	1963	1963–	9	1966, 1983, 1984, 1987, 1991, 1996, 2005, 2013, 2017
Northampton		Rams	Northampton Community Oval, Northampton	–	1961	1961–	7	1967, 1968, 1977, 1978, 1979, 2004, 2023
Railways		Blues	The Recreation Ground, Beachlands	GNFA	1904	1961–	12	1961, 1964, 1965, 1969, 1970, 1980, 1981, 1982, 1985, 1989, 2010, 2011
Rovers		Demons	Greenough Oval, Utakarra	GNFA	1895	1961–	11	1963, 1975, 1990, 1994, 1995, 1997, 1998, 2000, 2019, 2020, 2022
Towns		Bulldogs	WA Country Builders Stadium, Wonthella	GNFA	1952	1961–	13	1976, 1993, 1999, 2001, 2002, 2003, 2006, 2007, 2008, 2009, 2012, 2014, 2016

=== Former ===
Club	Colours	Nickname	Home Ground	Former League	Est.	Years in GNFL	Premierships		Fate
Club	Colours	Nickname	Home Ground	Former League	Est.	Years in GNFL	Total	Years	Fate
Dongara		Eagles	Irwin Recreation Centre, Port Denison	NMFL	1974	1995–1999	0	-	Returned to North Midlands FL in 2000
Irwin			Dongara Oval, Dongara and Walkaway Oval, Walkaway	GNFA	1960	1961–1964	0	-	Folded after 1964 season
St Patrick's College			St Pat's Oval, Geraldton			1961-1995	0	-	Stopped fielding a Colts team after 1995 season

== 2011 ladder ==
Great Northern	Wins	Byes	Losses	Draws	For	Against	%	Pts	Final	Team	G	B	Pts	Team	G	B	Pts
Railways	18	0	0	0	3019	1041	290.01%	72	1st semi	Rovers	19	20	134	Brigades	7	8	50
Towns	13	0	4	1	2667	1701	156.79%	54	2nd semi	Railways	22	21	153	Towns	8	7	55
Brigades	11	0	6	1	1983	1903	104.20%	46	Preliminary	Rovers	18	16	124	Towns	9	11	65
Rovers	8	0	10	0	1681	1896	88.66%	32	Grand	Railways	14	16	100	Rovers	12	12	84
Northampton	7	0	11	0	1617	2195	73.67%	28									
Chapman Valley	4	0	14	0	1439	2179	66.04%	16									
Mullewa	1	0	17	0	1375	2846	48.31%	4									

== 2012 ladder ==
Great Northern	Wins	Byes	Losses	Draws	For	Against	%	Pts	Final	Team	G	B	Pts	Team	G	B	Pts
Railways	14	0	2	0	2230	1065	209.39%	56	1st semi	Rovers	22	5	137	Mullewa	15	14	104
Towns	12	0	4	0	2201	1184	185.90%	48	2nd semi	Railways	12	6	78	Towns	15	17	107
Mullewa	12	0	4	0	2156	1190	181.18%	48	Preliminary	Railways	16	17	113	Rovers	13	7	85
Rovers	8	0	8	0	1687	1517	111.21%	32	Grand	Towns	16	14	110	Railways	13	10	88
Brigades	5	0	11	0	1489	1839	80.97%	20									
Northampton	3	0	13	0	1129	2632	42.90%	12									
Chapman Valley	2	0	14	0	989	2454	40.30%	8									

== 2013 ladder ==
Great Northern	Wins	Byes	Losses	Draws	For	Against	%	Pts	Final	Team	G	B	Pts	Team	G	B	Pts
Mullewa	14	0	2	0	2258	1424	158.57%	56	1st semi	Towns	21	8	134	Railways	11	13	79
Brigades	12	0	3	1	2183	1171	186.42%	50	2nd semi	Brigades	16	15	111	Mullewa	13	11	89
Towns	12	0	4	0	2090	1346	155.27%	48	Preliminary	Mullewa	25	23	173	Towns	12	10	82
Railways	8	0	7	1	1554	1371	113.35%	34	Grand	Mullewa	15	17	107	Brigades	11	15	81
Rovers	4	0	12	0	1219	1946	62.64%	16									
Northampton	4	0	12	0	1213	2183	55.57%	16									
Chapman Valley	1	0	15	0	1075	2151	49.98%	4									

== 2014 ladder ==
Great Northern	Wins	Byes	Losses	Draws	For	Against	%	Pts	Final	Team	G	B	Pts	Team	G	B	Pts
Brigades	12	0	2	0	1958	915	213.99%	48	1st semi	Mullewa	19	17	131	Railways	13	8	86
Towns	10	0	4	0	1733	1147	151.09%	40	2nd semi	Towns	12	12	84	Brigades	10	8	68
Mullewa	10	0	4	0	1792	1415	126.64%	40	Preliminary	Brigades	12	12	84	Mullewa	5	6	36
Railways	6	0	7	1	1319	1362	96.84%	26	Grand	Towns	9	16	70	Brigades	5	14	44
Rovers	6	0	8	0	1260	1646	76.55%	24									
Northampton	2	0	11	1	1097	1914	57.31%	10									
Chapman Valley	2	0	12	0	1033	1793	57.61%	8									

== 2015 ladder ==
Great Northern	Wins	Byes	Losses	Draws	For	Against	%	Pts	Final	Team	G	B	Pts	Team	G	B	Pts
Brigades	10	0	4	0	1702	1209	140.78%	40	1st semi	Railways	14	16	100	Mullewa	9	17	71
Towns	9	0	5	0	1516	1010	150.10%	36	2nd semi	Towns	13	14	92	Brigades	9	9	63
Mullewa	9	0	5	0	1723	1363	126.41%	36	Preliminary	Brigades	17	12	114	Railways	9	7	61
Railways	7	0	6	1	1236	1279	96.64%	30	Grand	Brigades	11	5	71	Towns	7	14	56
Rovers	7	0	7	0	1230	1304	94.33%	28									
Chapman Valley	6	0	8	0	1122	1390	80.72%	24									
Northampton	0	0	13	1	1046	2020	51.78%	2									

== 2016 ladder ==
Great Northern	Wins	Byes	Losses	Draws	For	Against	%	Pts	Final	Team	G	B	Pts	Team	G	B	Pts
Towns	12	0	2	0	1678	824	203.64%	48	1st semi	Brigades	18	19	127	Chapman valley	9	5	59
Railways	11	0	3	0	1455	944	154.13%	44	2nd semi	Towns	20	12	132	Railways	16	10	106
Brigades	9	0	5	0	1456	1017	143.17%	36	Preliminary	Railways	13	21	99	Brigades	8	15	63
Chapman Valley	7	0	7	0	1200	1064	112.78%	28	Grand	Towns	20	7	127	Railways	7	4	46
Rovers	5	0	9	0	1137	1479	76.88%	20									
Northampton	4	0	10	0	974	1570	62.04%	16									
Mullewa	1	0	13	0	945	1947	48.54%	4									

== 2017 ladder ==
Great Northern	Wins	Byes	Losses	Draws	For	Against	%	Pts	Final	Team	G	B	Pts	Team	G	B	Pts
Railways	13	0	1	0	1775	679	261.41%	52	1st semi	Rovers	13	11	89	Towns	12	8	80
Mullewa	10	0	4	0	1425	1195	119.25%	40	2nd semi	Mullewa	13	11	89	Railways	13	9	87
Towns	9	0	5	0	1580	1047	150.91%	36	Preliminary	Railways	19	5	119	Rovers	11	13	79
Rovers	9	0	5	0	1346	1166	115.44%	36	Grand	Mullewa	15	16	106	Railways	11	10	76
Northampton	4	0	10	0	979	1529	64.03%	16									
Brigades	3	0	11	0	983	1551	63.38%	12									
Chapman Valley	1	0	13	0	688	1609	42.76%	4									

== Other references ==
http://www.gnfl.com.au/

- Western Australian Football: The Clubs, Competitions and Premiers (1885–1945) - Derek Mott
