= Tarcoola (disambiguation) =

Tarcoola is a town in South Australia.

Tarcoola may also refer to:

- Mount Tarcoola, Western Australia
- Tarcoola Beach, Western Australia
- Tarcoola (horse), a Melbourne Cup winner
