= List of Geraldton suburbs =

Suburbs of Geraldton, Western Australia

- Beachlands
- Beresford
- Bluff Point
- Cape Burney
- Deepdale
- Drummond Cove
- Geraldton
- Glenfield
- Karloo
- Mahomets Flats
- Meru
- Moresby
- Mount Tarcoola
- Narngulu
- Rangeway
- Rudds Gully
- Spalding
- Strathalbyn
- Sunset Beach
- Tarcoola Beach
- Utakarra
- Waggrakine
- Wandina
- Webberton
- West End
- Wonthella
- Woorree
