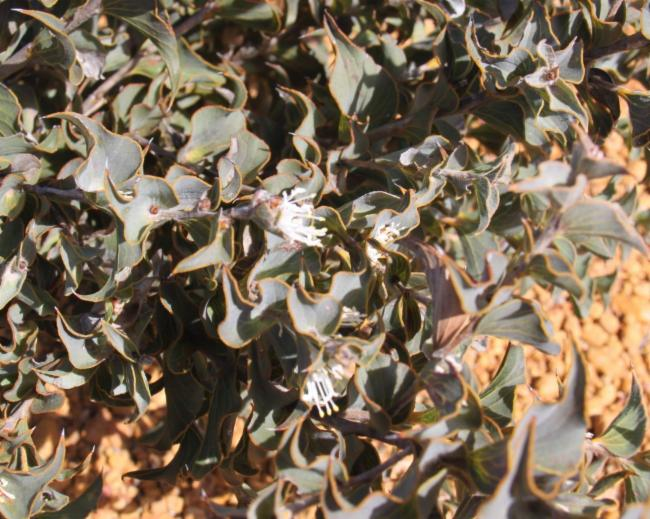
- Hakea smilacifolia growing along the Brand Highway near Eneabba

Scientific classification
- Kingdom: Plantae
- Clade: Tracheophytes
- Clade: Angiosperms
- Clade: Eudicots
- Order: Proteales
- Family: Proteaceae
- Genus: Hakea
- Species: H. smilacifolia

Binomial name
- Hakea smilacifolia Meisn.
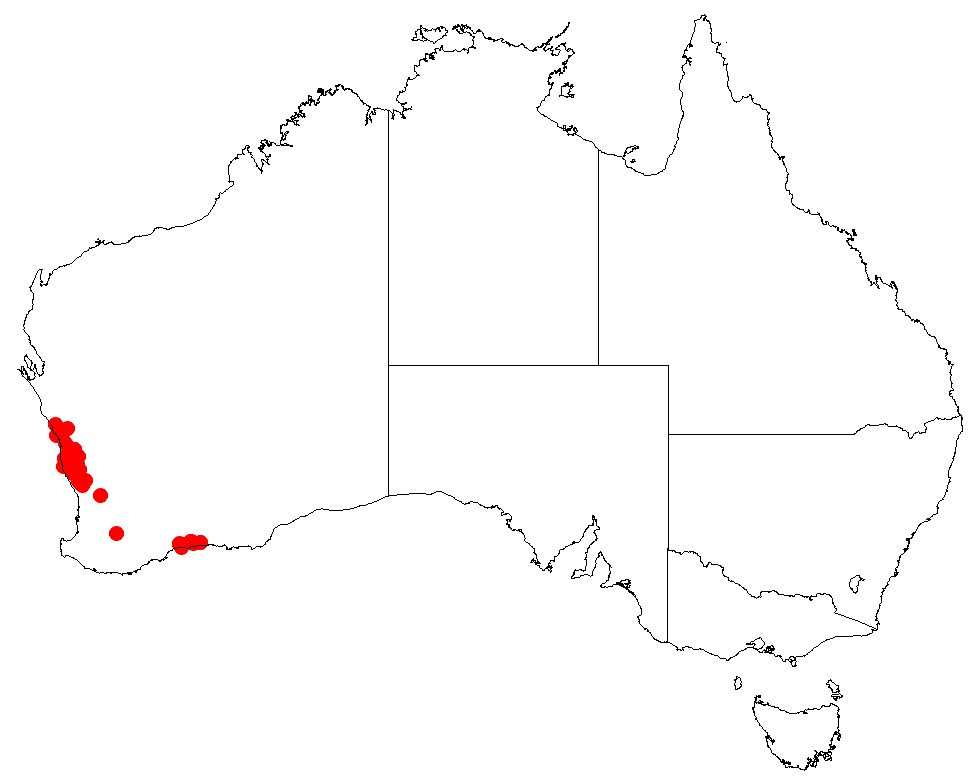
- Occurrence data from Australasian Virtual Herbarium

= Hakea smilacifolia =

Species of shrub endemic to Western Australia

Hakea smilacifolia is a shrub in the family Proteaceae. It has sweetly scented flowers, stiff leathery leaves and is endemic to an area in the Mid West, western Wheatbelt and the Goldfields-Esperance regions of Western Australia.

== Description ==
Hakea smilacifolia is an open, sprawling shrub typically growing to a height of 1 to 2 metres (3 to 7 ft) with smooth grey bark and does not form a lignotuber. The branchlets are moderately covered with long, soft hairs or coarse, rough long hairs. The hairs becoming short, soft, rusty coloured and matted at flowering. Flowers are mostly concealed by thick leathery alternate leaves 15–70 mm (0.6–3 in) long by 8–50 cm (3–20 in) wide. The grey-green leaves vary in shape, lower leaves are elliptic to egg-shaped. Leaves nearer to the flowers are broader and taper to a point at the apex. The leaves are often folded over and have curving prominent veins. The inflorescence consists of 5 or 6 white or creamy-white flowers, are sweetly scented and appear in clusters in the leaf axils. The smooth pedicel is 1.2–2 mm (0.047–0.079 in) long, the pistil 14–15 mm (0.55–0.59 in) long and the perianth white. The fruit are smooth, very small and have a 3 dimensional shape, 1.1–1.3 mm (0.043–0.051 in) long and 4–6 mm (0.16–0.24 in) wide and taper to a short pointed beak.

== Taxonomy and naming ==
Hakeas smilacifolia was first formally described by Carl Meisner in 1845 and published the description in Plantae Preissianae. The specific epithet refers to a similarity of the leaves of this species to one in the genus Smilax.

== Distribution and habitat ==
Grows from the northern sandplains at Three Springs ranging south to Gingin. There is also a recorded population west of Esperance. Grows in heath and scrubland in sand and gravel. Requires good drainage and sunny aspect.

== Conservation status ==
Hakea smilacifolia is classified as "not threatened" by the Western Australian Government Department of Parks and Wildlife.
