= Glenfield, Western Australia =

Coordinates: 28°41′31″S 114°36′40″E

Glenfield
- Suburb
- Coordinates
- Country: Australia
- State: Western Australia
- City: Geraldton
- LGA(s): City of Greater Geraldton
- Location: 8 km (5.0 mi) N of Geraldton

Government
  - State electorate(s): Geraldton
  - Federal division(s): Durack

Area
  - Total: 8.3 km^{2} (3.2 sq mi)

Population
  - Total(s): 1,009 (SAL 2021)
- Postcode: 6532
Suburbs around Glenfield
	Drummond Cove
Indian Ocean	Glenfield	Waggrakine
Sunset Beach	Bluff Point	Spalding

Glenfield is a locality north of Geraldton, Western Australia. Its local government area is the City of Greater Geraldton.

The suburb was gazetted in 1979.

== Geography ==
Glenfield is located 8 kilometres (5 mi) north of Geraldton's central business district. It is bounded on the west by the Indian Ocean, on the south by Chapman Road and Chapman Valley Road, and on the east by North West Coastal Highway.

Glenfield was the location of the Northampton and Upper Chapman Valley railway lines, which met at Wokarina.

== Demography ==
In the 2006 census, Glenfield had a population of 203.
