= Leucopogon psammophilus =

Conservation status
- Priority One — Poorly Known Taxa (DEC)

Scientific classification
- Kingdom: Plantae
- Clade: Tracheophytes
- Clade: Angiosperms
- Clade: Eudicots
- Clade: Asterids
- Order: Ericales
- Family: Ericaceae
- Genus: Leucopogon
- Species: L. psammophilus

Binomial name
- Leucopogon psammophilus E.Pritz.
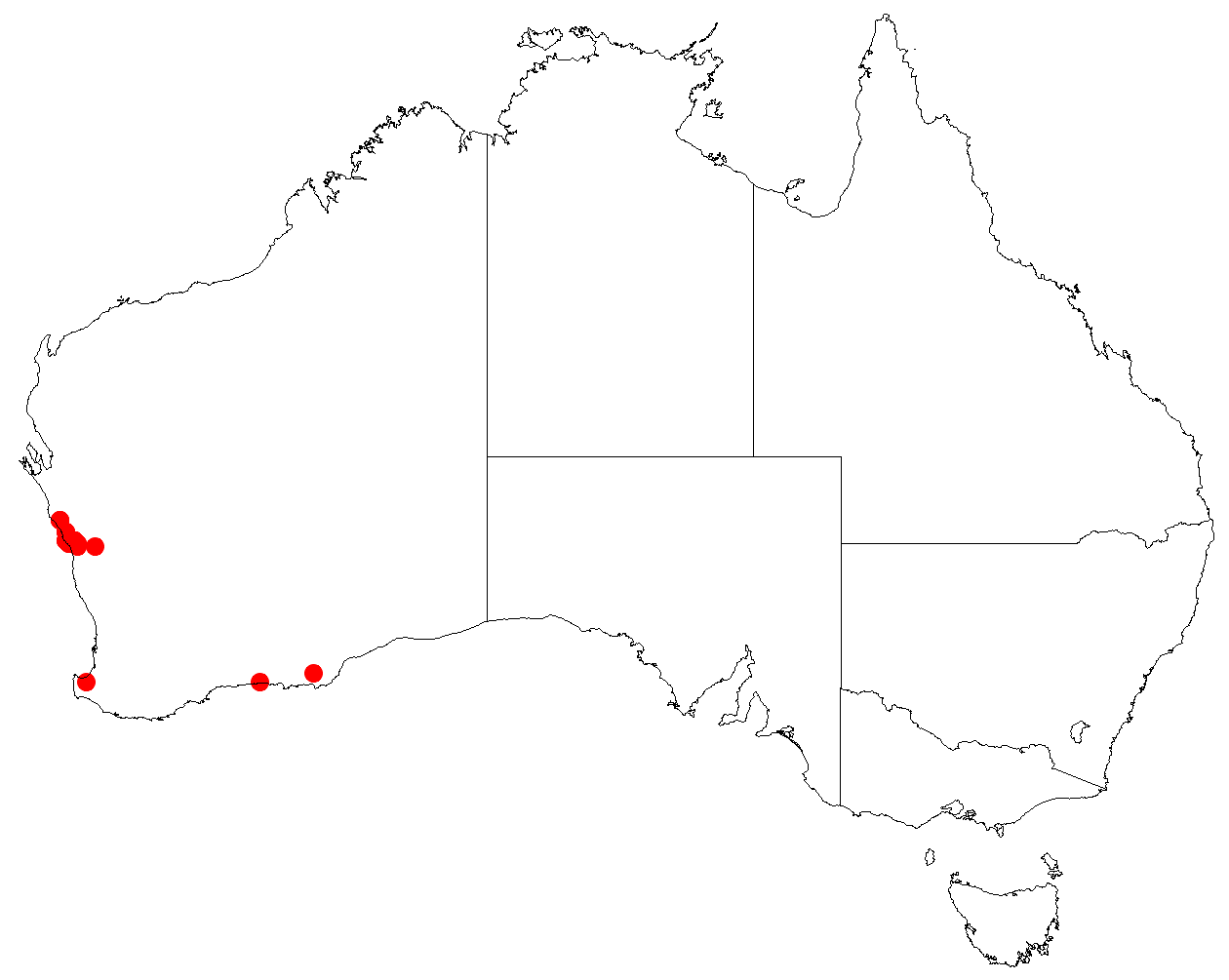
- Occurrence data from AVH

Synonyms
- Leucopogon teretostylus J.D.Briggs & Leigh nom. inval., nom. nud.; Leucopogon teretostylus Paczk. & A.R.Chapm. nom. inval.; Styphelia psammophila (E.Pritz.) Sleumer

Species of plant

Leucopogon psammophilus is a species of flowering plant in the heath family Ericaceae and is endemic to the south-west of Western Australia. It is a shrub that typically grows to a height of 45 cm (18 in) and grows on breakaways in the Geraldton Sandplains bioregion of south-western Western Australia. The species was first formally described in 1904 by Ernst Georg Pritzel in Botanische Jahrbücher für Systematik, Pflanzengeschichte und Pflanzengeographie from specimens collected near the Greenough River. It is listed as "Priority One" by the Government of Western Australia Department of Biodiversity, Conservation and Attractions, meaning that it is known from only one or a few locations which are potentially at risk.
