= Scaevola kallophylla =

Scientific classification
- Kingdom: Plantae
- Clade: Embryophytes
- Clade: Tracheophytes
- Clade: Spermatophytes
- Clade: Angiosperms
- Clade: Eudicots
- Clade: Asterids
- Order: Asterales
- Family: Goodeniaceae
- Genus: Scaevola
- Species: S. kallophylla

Binomial name
- Scaevola kallophylla G.J.Howell
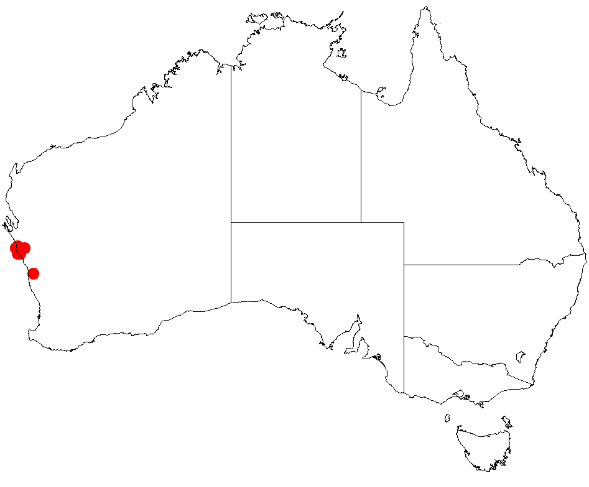
- Occurrence data from AVH

Species of shrub

Scaevola kallophylla is a species of flowering plant in the family Goodeniaceae and is endemic to the west of Western Australia. It is an erect, compact shrub with hairy stems, sessile, lance-shaped to egg-shaped leaves with the narrower end towards the base, and sessile white flowers with maroon streaks.

== Description ==
Scaevola kallophylla is an erect, compact shrub that typically grows to a height of 1 m (3 ft 3 in) and has hairy stems and appears to have particularly dense foliage on the ends of its branches. Its leaves are sessile, lance-shaped to egg-shaped with the narrower end towards the base, 70.9–117.0 mm (2.79–4.61 in) long, 14.3–25.1 mm (0.56–0.99 in) wide, sometimes with toothed edges and hairy. The flowers are sessile, 16–36 mm (0.63–1.42 in) long and 20–35 mm (0.79–1.38 in) wide, borne singly in leaf axils or in spikes on lateral branches up to 120 mm (4.7 in) long.The bracteoles are lance-shaped, 10–18 mm (0.39–0.71 in) long and 1.9–4.6 mm (0.075–0.181 in) wide. The petals are white with maroon streaks, 12–23 mm (0.47–0.91 in) long, and the wings are flat, 2.3–4.4 mm (0.091–0.173 in) wide. Flowering mainly occurs from August to December.

== Taxonomy ==
Scaevola kallophylla was first formally described in 1996 by G.J. Howell in the journal Nuytsia from specimens he collected near the Kalbarri airport turnoff in Kalbarri National Park. The specific epithet (kallophylla) means 'beautiful leaf', "alluding to its attractive foliage which resembles that of some Callistemon species.

== Distribution and habitat ==
This species of scaevola grows in light sandy soils in coastal heath on the coastal plain between the Murchison and Greenough Rivers in the Geraldton Sandplains bioregion of western Western Australia.

== Conservation status ==
Scaevola kallophylla is listed as 'Priority Four' by the Government of Western Australia Department of Biodiversity, Conservation and Attractions, meaning that is rare or near threatened.
