= Beachlands =

Beachlands is the name of several places:

In Australia

- Beachlands, Western Australia

In New Zealand

- Beachlands, New Zealand, a suburb of Auckland
- Beachlands Speedway, a motor racing circuit near Dunedin, New Zealand

In the United Kingdom

- Beachlands, Hampshire, on Hayling Island
