= Geraldton Road District =

Former local government area in Western Australia

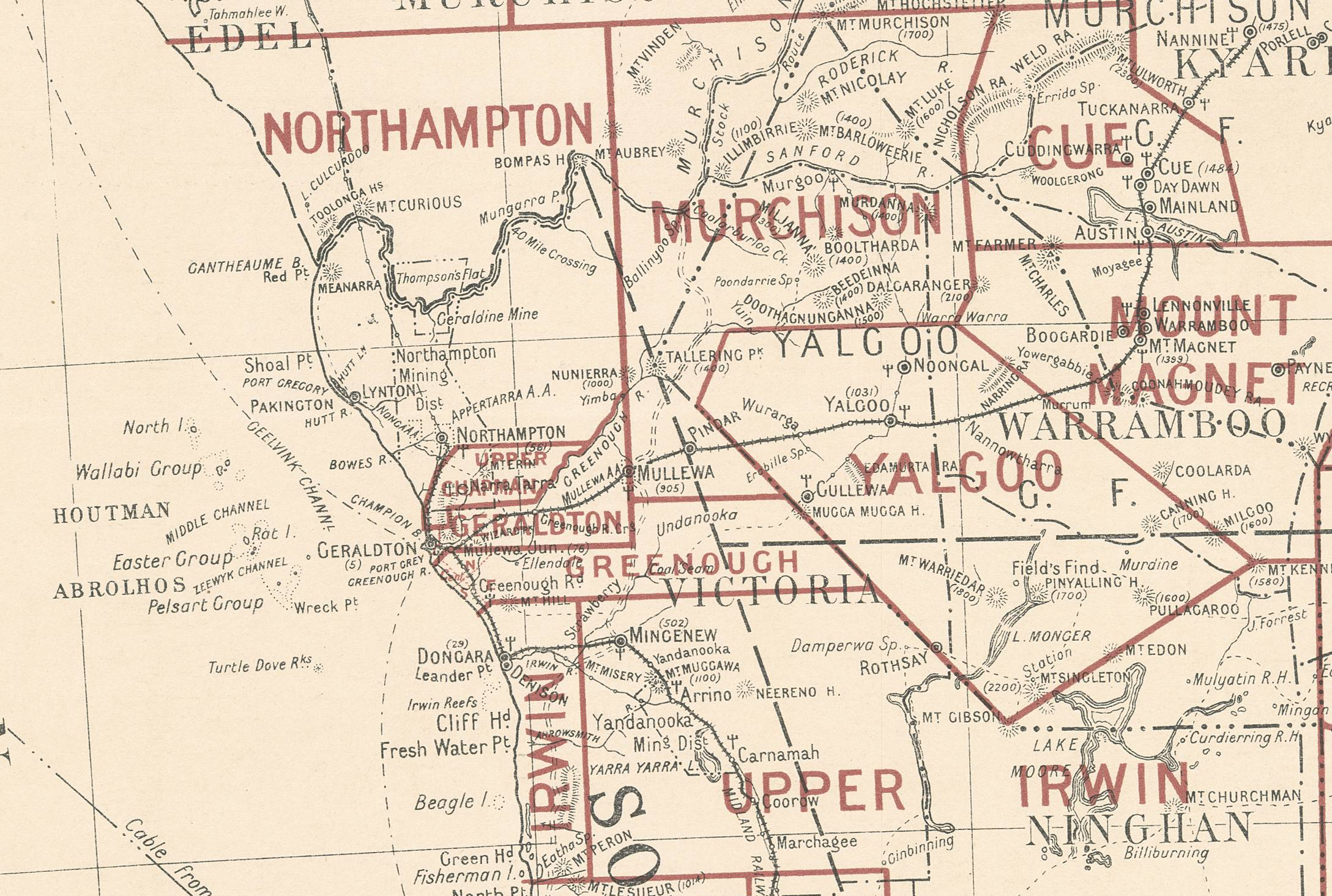
Geraldton (at centre) and surrounding road districts, 1905

The Geraldton Road District was an early form of local government area in the Mid West region of Western Australia. It was based in the town of Geraldton, although Geraldton was not part of the road district, having been separately incorporated as the Municipality of Geraldton.

It was established on 24 January 1871. It met at the Geraldton Town Hall in its early years, later switching to the office of the road board secretary.

A section of the district separated to form the Murchison Road District on 3 August 1875 and another section separated to form the Mullewa Road District on 11 August 1911.

Prominent pastoralist Walter Vernon from Sandsprings Homestead was a long-serving member of the Geraldton Road Board, being first elected to the board in 1910 and serving as its chairman from 1913 to 1944.

The Geraldton Road District ceased to exist on 21 December 1951, when it amalgamated with the Greenough Road District to form the Geraldton-Greenough Road District. A small section of the former road district was added to the Municipality of Geraldton in light of the town having expanded. The amalgamation was largely amicable, with an attempt by the Geraldton board to retain their name for the merged entity being one of the few brief issues of contention.
