= Waggrakine, Western Australia =

Waggrakine
- Suburb
- Coordinates: 28°40′52″S 114°41′17″E
- Country: Australia
- State: Western Australia
- City: Geraldton
- LGA(s): City of Greater Geraldton
- Location: 8 km (5.0 mi) NNE of Geraldton

Government
  - State electorate(s): Geraldton
  - Federal division(s): Durack

Area
  - Total: 31.2 km^{2} (12.0 sq mi)

Population
  - Total(s): 2,679 (SAL 2021)
- Postcode: 6530
Suburbs around Waggrakine
Glenfield
Glenfield	Waggrakine	Moresby
Sunset Beach	Spalding	Moresby

Waggrakine is an outer northern suburb of Geraldton, Western Australia in the local government area of the City of Greater Geraldton.

The suburb was gazetted in 1979.

In the 2006 census, Waggrakine had a population of 2,363.

== History ==
In 1870, colonial governor Frederick Weld authorised the establishment of an experimental coffee plantation, based on observations by Charles Grenfell Nicolay that the local geography was similar to that of Brazil's coffee-growing districts. Nicolay was granted 640 acres (260 ha) of land, government funding of £100, and access to five ticket of leave convicts. However, by 1873 the plantation had proved unsuccessful, "due mainly to the persistently strong winds and lack of rainfall". A cottage and well on the site – known as the Coffee Pot – are heritage-listed.
