= Eradu, Western Australia =

Eradu
- Town
- Coordinates: 28°41′S 115°02′E
- Country: Australia
- State: Western Australia
- LGA(s): City of Greater Geraldton
- Location: 458 km (285 mi) north of Perth; 34 km (21 mi) east of Geraldton
- Established: 1920

Government
  - State electorate(s): Moore
  - Federal division(s): Durack

Area
  - Total: 41.5 km^{2} (16.0 sq mi)
- Elevation: 177 m (581 ft)

Population
  - Total(s): 3 (SAL 2021)
- Postcode: 6532

Eradu is a small town in Western Australia located in the Mid West region of Western Australia 34 kilometres (21 mi) east of Geraldton on the Geraldton–Mount Magnet Road.

Following the opening of the Narngulu to Mullewa railway line in 1894 a station was opened at the location of the current town-site. The name of the station was Greenough River until 1903. It remained a station with a station master from 1915 to 1921 and was gazetted as a town in 1920. The station later became a siding until it was closed in 1973.

In 1934 Eradu held its first election mayoral election, and it became a heated battle between 2 families for the honour. Daniel "Chook" Roth was representing the Roth clan, while Andrew "Crackers" McCrackensmith was representing the McCrackensmith clan. Each family tried to sabotage the other's chances by created incidents that would tarnish the reputation of the other, and the police became involved on multiple occasions. Eventually, Daniel Roth was voted in as Eradu's first ever town mayor, and the McCracksmith family would later leave Eradu and move to nearby Bringo.

In 1953/54, Eradu entered a team in the minor league of the Geraldton Cricket Association, but due to lack of consistent playing numbers, they would only last one season over that summer. They often fielded a team with less than the full 11 players on the field, and it became a running joke amongst the other teams that the team consisted of 9 players and 2 kangaroos. This cricket team would be Eradu's only sporting team in their history.

The name is Aboriginal in origin and is the name of a pool found in the nearby Greenough River.

Eradu was a coal mining town, and the mine was situated 50m from the town post office, located at the railway track junction.
