= Karloo, Western Australia =

Karloo
- Suburb
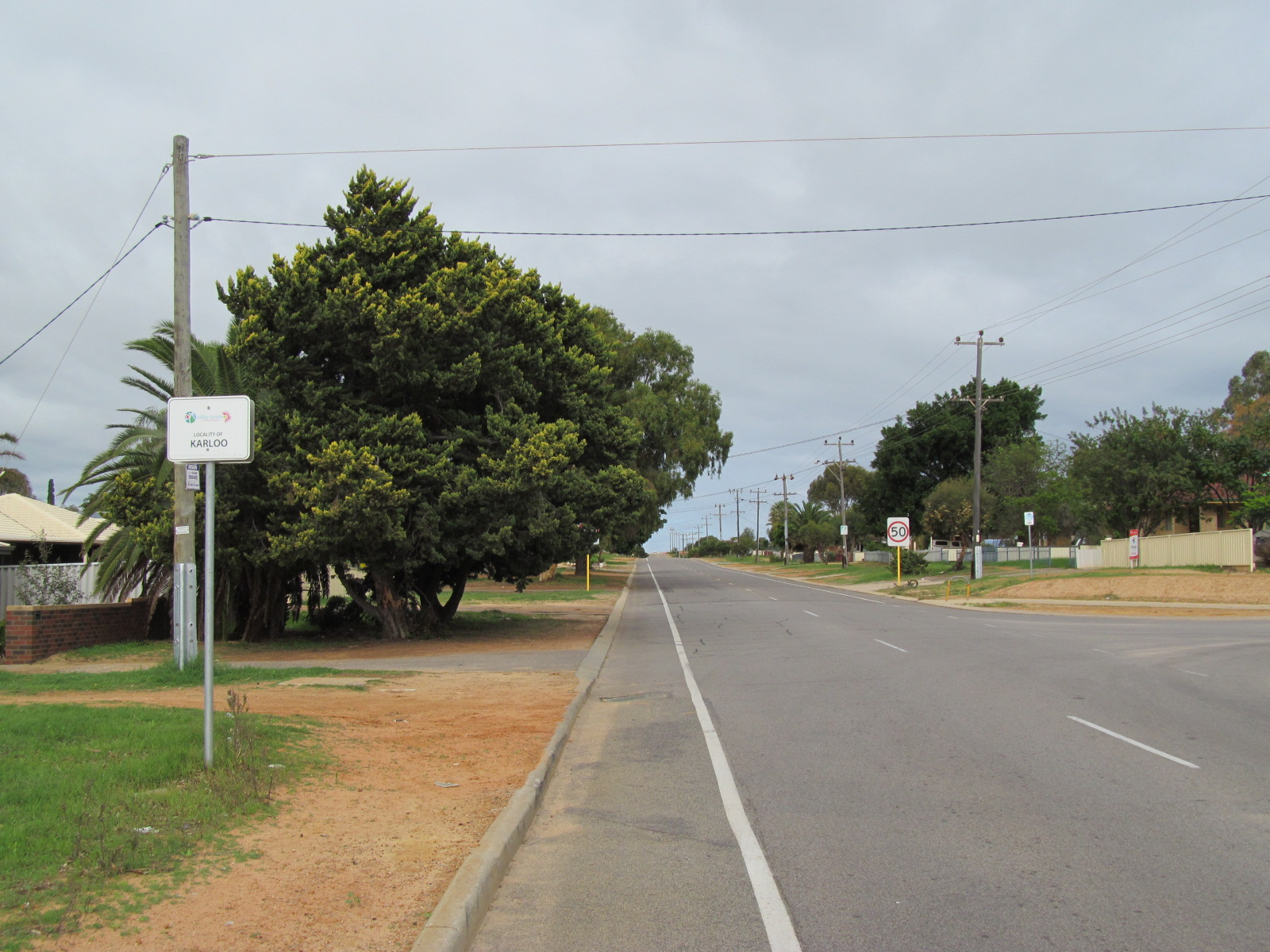
- Entering Karloo

- Interactive map of Karloo
- Coordinates: 28°48′22″S 114°38′02″E
- Country: Australia
- State: Western Australia
- City: Geraldton
- LGA: City of Greater Geraldton
- Location: 5 km (3.1 mi) SE of Geraldton

Government
  - State electorate: Geraldton
  - Federal division: Durack

Area
  - Total: 3.9 km^{2} (1.5 sq mi)

Population
  - Total: 495 (SAL 2021)
- Postcode: 6530
Suburbs around Karloo
Rangeway	Utakarra	Utakarra
Mount Tarcoola	Karloo	Narngulu
Wandina	Rudds Gully	Narngulu

Karloo is a locality southeast of Geraldton, Western Australia. Its local government area is the City of Greater Geraldton.

The locality was gazetted in 1979. It contains Champion Bay Senior High School.

== Geography ==
Karloo is located 5 kilometres (3.1 mi) southeast of Geraldton's central business district, extending southeast from the suburb of Rangeway. Much of Karloo is still in its native state, and the route of the proposed Geraldton Southern Transport Corridor passes through the locality.

== Demographics ==
In the 2011 census, Karloo had a population of 649. The median age of Karloo residents was 28 - significantly lower than the regional average of 37 - and median household incomes were below average for the region — $846 per week compared with $1234 per week. 32.5% of the population were identified as Aboriginal. 75% of people were born in Australia, and the next most common countries of birth were England 3.4%, New Zealand 1.4%, Vietnam 1.2%, Ireland 0.6%, and Papua New Guinea 0.6%.

The most popular religious affiliations in descending order in the 2011 census were Roman Catholic 26.3%, no religion 25.4%, Anglican 12.9%, Islam 4.8%, and Baptist 2.0%.
