= Brand Highway =

Highway in Western Australia

Brand Highway Western Australia
- Map of Brand Highway, highlighted in red, and surrounding road network between Perth and Geraldton

General information
- Type: Highway
- Length: 367.98 km (229 mi)
- Opened: 4 April 1975
- Route number(s): National Route 1

Major junctions
- South end: Great Northern Highway (National Highway 95 / National Route 1); Tonkin Highway (State Route 4), Muchea
- Indian Ocean Drive (State Route 60); Midlands Road (State Route 116)
- North end: North West Coastal Highway (National Route 1), Geraldton

Location(s)
- Major settlements: Cataby, Badgingarra, Eneabba, Dongara

Highway system
- Highways in Australia; National Highway • Freeways in Australia; Highways in Western Australia

Brand Highway is a 370-kilometre (230 mi) main highway linking the northern outskirts of Perth to Geraldton in Western Australia. Together with North West Coastal Highway, it forms part of the Western Australian coastal link to the Northern Territory. The highway is a part of Australia's Highway 1, and is for the most part a single carriageway with one lane in each direction.

The highway was completed in 1975 and opened in 1976 being named it in honour of former Premier of Western Australia Sir David Brand. It replaced the Midlands Road from Perth to Dongara.

== Route description ==
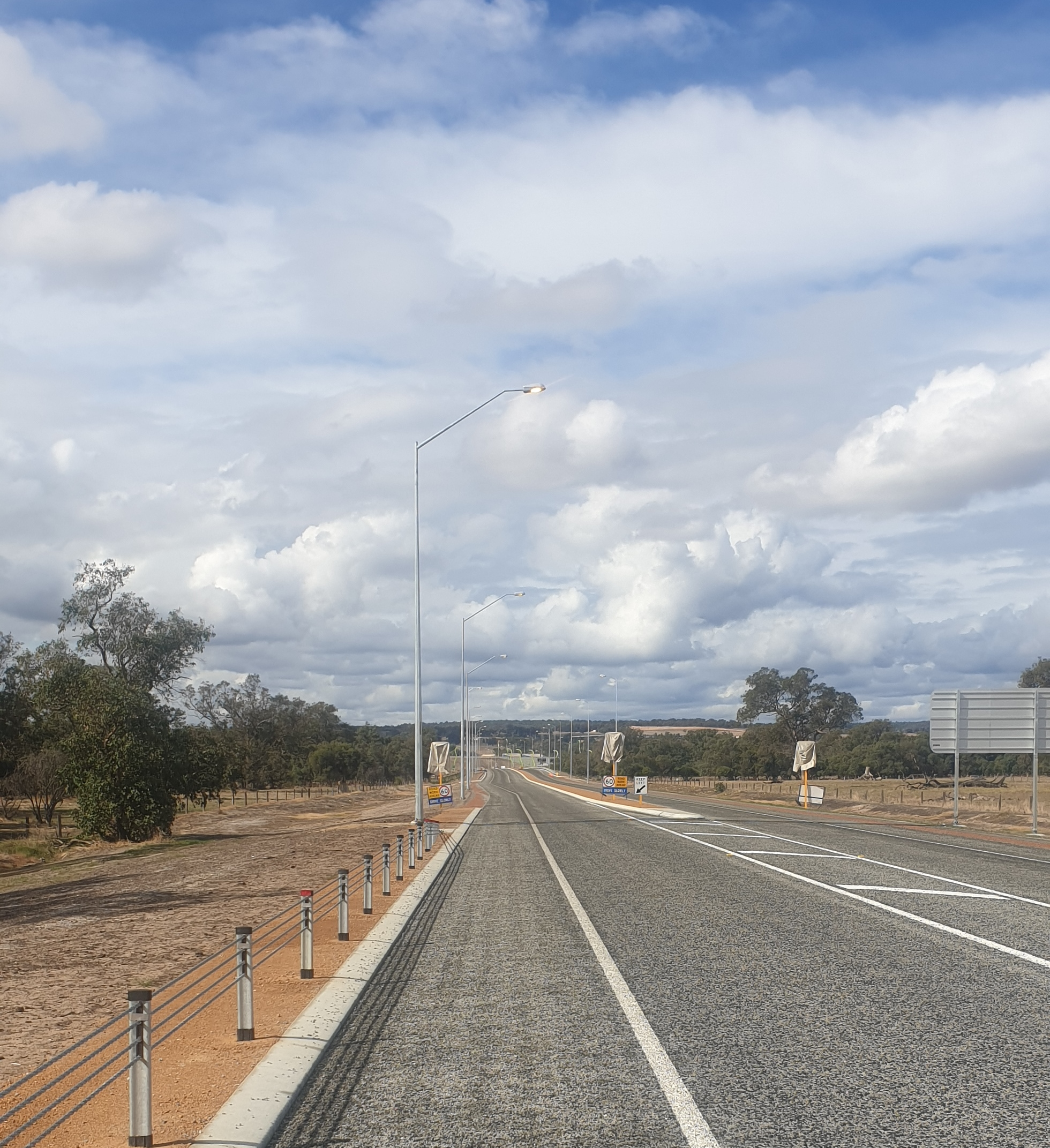
Looking east along Brand Highway to its southern terminus at the interchange with Great Northern and Tonkin Highways

The Brand Highway, along with the associated section of National Route 1, begins in Muchea, branching off from a roundabout interchange connecting it to both Great Northern Highway to the north and east and Tonkin Highway to the south. The highway passes through agricultural areas and shrublands, travelling through or near the towns of Gingin, Badgingarra (and Badgingarra National Park), Cataby, Eneabba, Dongara and Greenough. The highway ends after 370 kilometres (230 mi) at the city of Geraldton. National Route 1, and traffic travelling to areas further north of here, continue along North West Coastal Highway towards Port Hedland. The vast majority of the highway is a two-lane single carriageway with a speed limit of 110 kilometres per hour (70 mph), except in and around built up areas where it slows down to speeds of between 60 and 90 kilometres per hour (35 and 55 mph).

Main Roads Western Australia monitors traffic volume across the state's road network, including various locations along Brand Highway. In the 2012/13 financial year, the recorded traffic volumes ranged from 15,400 vehicles per day north of Olive Street, near Geraldton, down to 1,470 south of Indian Ocean Drive. The highest percentage of heavy vehicles was 36.0% south of Airfield Road, the access road to RAAF Gingin. Reports commissioned by the Royal Automobile Club of Western Australia (RAC) in 2006 and 2008 gave the highway a three-star safety rating out of five. The overall highway network was generally rated as three-star or four-star, with around 10% in 2006 and 5% in 2008 receiving a two-star rating.

=== Wheatbelt ===
From the Great Northern and Tonkin Highways at Muchea, the Brand Highway heads west for two kilometres (1.2 mi) crossing over the Midland railway line and Granary Drive (the original Brand Highway alignment through Muchea Townsite). It heads north-west, paralleling the railway for 22 kilometres (14 mi), towards Gingin. While the railway continues north to the town, the highway deviates to the west, continuing north-west through the Wheatbelt. Brand Highway reaches the Regans Ford roadhouse after 52 kilometres (32 mi). Forty kilometres (25 mi) on, the highway turns north for 40 kilometres (25 mi), past Bandgingarra National Park, to Badgingarra. The Brand Highway leaves the Wheatbelt for the Mid West region, continuing its journey north-westwards.

=== Mid West ===
The Brand Highway encounters Eneabba 74 kilometres (46 mi) beyond Badgingarra, and after another 50 kilometres (31 mi) meets the northern end of the coastal road Indian Ocean Drive. The highway travels north for 24 kilometres (15 mi) to the terminus of The Midlands Road, just outside Dongara. The Brand Highway heads west for seven kilometres (4.3 mi) into the town, and then follows the coast north and north-westwards. It reaches South Greenough after 35 kilometres (22 mi), where it realigns itself one kilometre (0.6 mi) to the north-east via two 90° curves. The Brand Highway continues north-west, passing through Greenough after five kilometres (3 mi), and terminating 22 kilometres (14 mi) further on in Geraldton, at a diamond interchange with North West Coastal Highway. For the last five kilometres (3 mi) of its length, the Brand Highway serves as the main road for the southern suburbs of Geraldton, including Wandina, Tarcoola Beach, Mount Tarcoola and Mahomets Flats.

== History ==
Within two years of its formation in 1926, Western Australia's new Main Roads Board (Note: Predecessor to the Main Roads Department, now Main Roads Western Australia) became responsible for the state's arterial and trunk roads, which were declared 'main roads' under the Main Roads Act. The main road to Geraldton branched off the Perth–Meekatharra road (Note: Now named Great Northern Highway) at Walebing, near Moora, travelled an inland route via Mingenew to Dongara, and then continued north along the coast to Geraldton. A new main road from Perth to Geraldton via Mogumber was proposed in the 1940s, but was rejected by the Minister for Works, who considered the development of parallel routes infeasible given that traffic was light.

Western Australia's Nomenclature Advisory Committee (Note: Now the Geographic Names Committee) proposed in October 1940 that a highway name, Great Northern Highway, be used to describe the main route from Midland to Geraldton, and extending to areas further north. By July 1941, the committee's proposal had expanded to three highway names for the roads in the state's northern areas: Great Northern Highway for the Midland Junction to Wyndham road, North West Coastal Highway for the road linking Geraldton to Port Hedland and De Grey, and Geraldton Highway for the Walebing–Mingenew–Geraldton route. This road was gazetted as Geraldton Highway on 17 September 1943, superseding the previously used names of Choral Street, Yarma Street, Railway Road, Midland Street, Railway Street and Irwin Road.

From the 1950s, increasing development between Perth and Geraldton saw the planning and establishment of a road network linking Dongara and Gingin – though the roads were not initially intended to become a highway. Early surveying of the roads, in the 1950s, was undertaken from within a light aircraft flying over the area. This was one of the first times in Western Australia that this technique was used. Wide road reserves, up to 200 metres (660 ft) in width, were acquired from crown land and pastoral leases. This allowed native wildflowers to survive and flourish on public land, providing aesthetically pleasing and interesting views to reduce road hypnosis and driver fatigue. The road would also be made safer by removing natural roadside obstacles, and replacing them with shrubs and more wildflowers.

Construction of new roads that would eventually be part of the Brand Highway began in 1959. Various segments were completed as the need arose, until in 1975, there was a new link between Perth and Geraldton. The route reduced the distance between the cities by 78 kilometres (48 mi), and had a total cost of $4.2 million. On 14 February 1975, the new road was gazetted as part of the Geraldton Highway, with the old route via Moora renamed The Midlands Road. It was officially opened on 4 April 1975 by the Minister for Transport, Ray O'Connor at Eneabba. One year later, the road was named Brand Highway after Sir David Brand, who was Premier of Western Australia from 1959 to 1971 and also held the local electorate of Greenough from 1945 to 1975. The change of name from Geraldton Highway to Brand Highway was gazetted on 12 March 1976. Premier Charles Court officiated a ceremony held on 30 April 1976 at a tourist information bay in Dongara, where a plaque was unveiled commemorating the naming of the highway.

The northern end of Brand Highway was upgraded as part of Stage 1 of the Geraldton Southern Transport Corridor, the biggest individual project in the early 2000s across all of rural Western Australia. The project, constructed between March 2004 and December 2005 at a cost of $92.5 million, involved the relocation of railway tracks, five kilometres (3.1 mi) worth of road works, and grade separation of roads. Brand Highway's northern terminus at North West Coastal Highway was upgraded from a roundabout to an interchange. An overpass was built for nearby Durlacher Street to cross North West Coastal Highway, which was made into a dual carriageway in the vicinity of the interchange. Stage 2 of the project, constructed between December 2008 and December 2009, provided a new single carriageway connection to Geraldton–Mount Magnet Road, with access to Geraldton Airport.

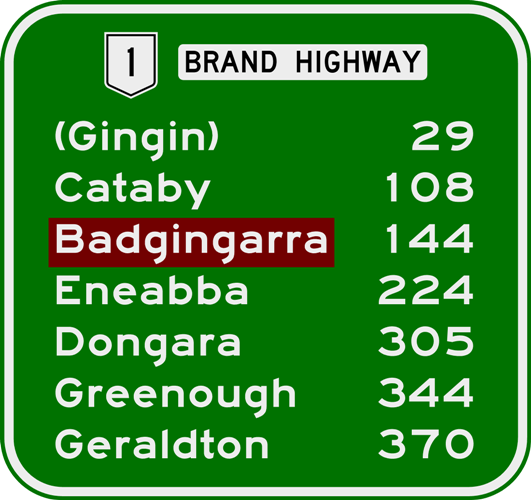
Distances to towns on or near the highway, from Muchea

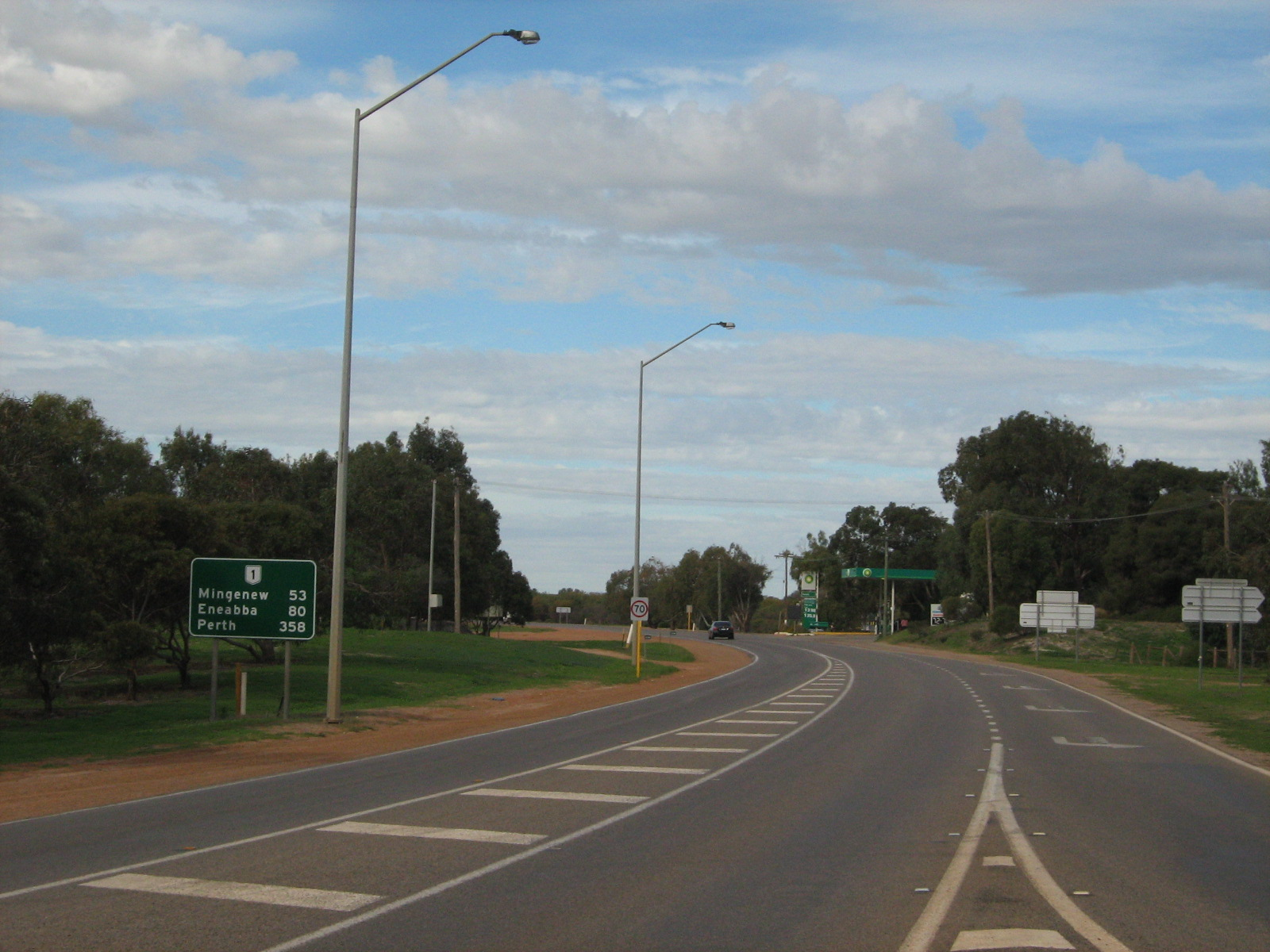
View east near Moreton Terrace, Dongara

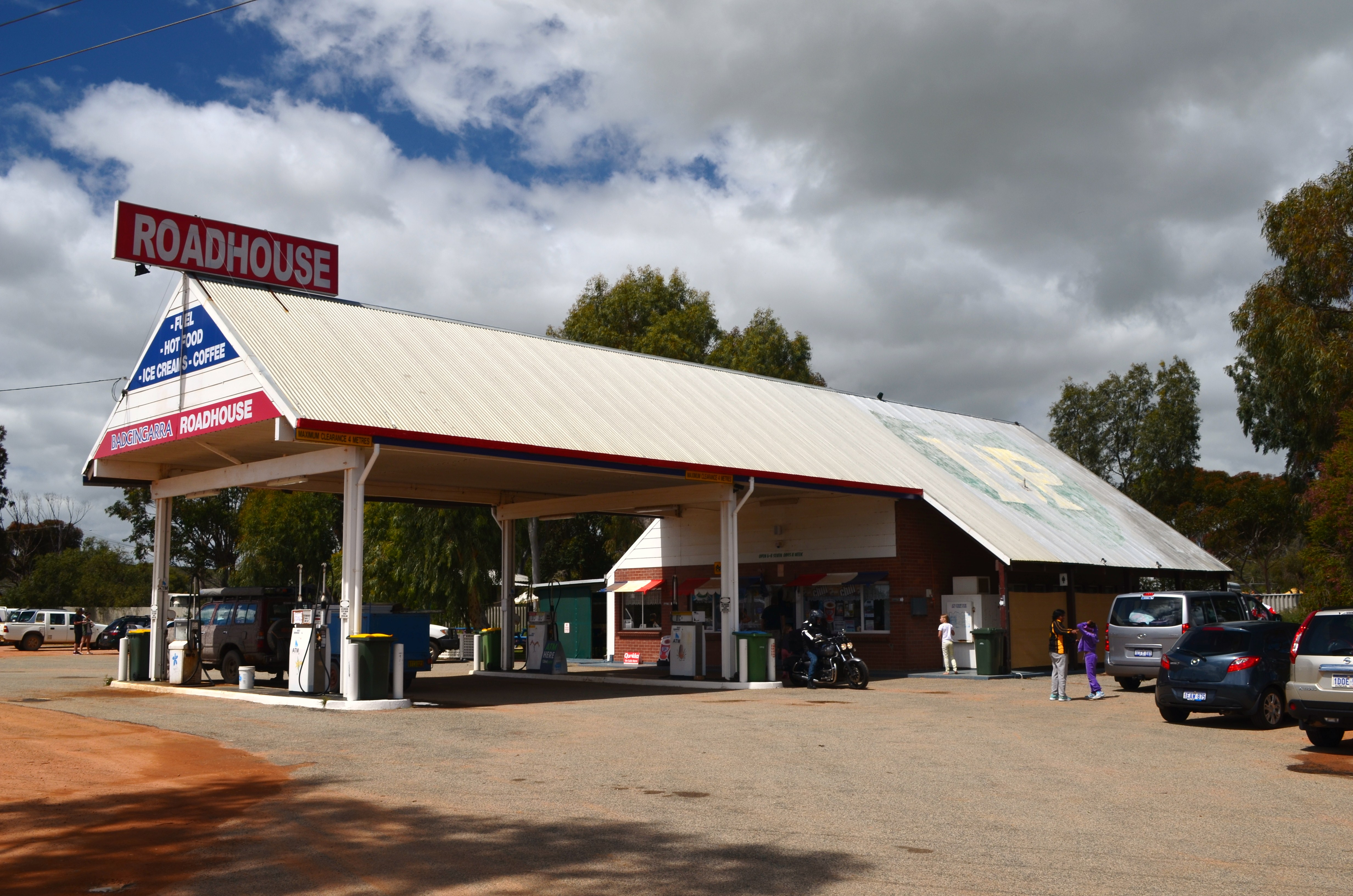
Badgingarra Roadhouse is located just off the highway

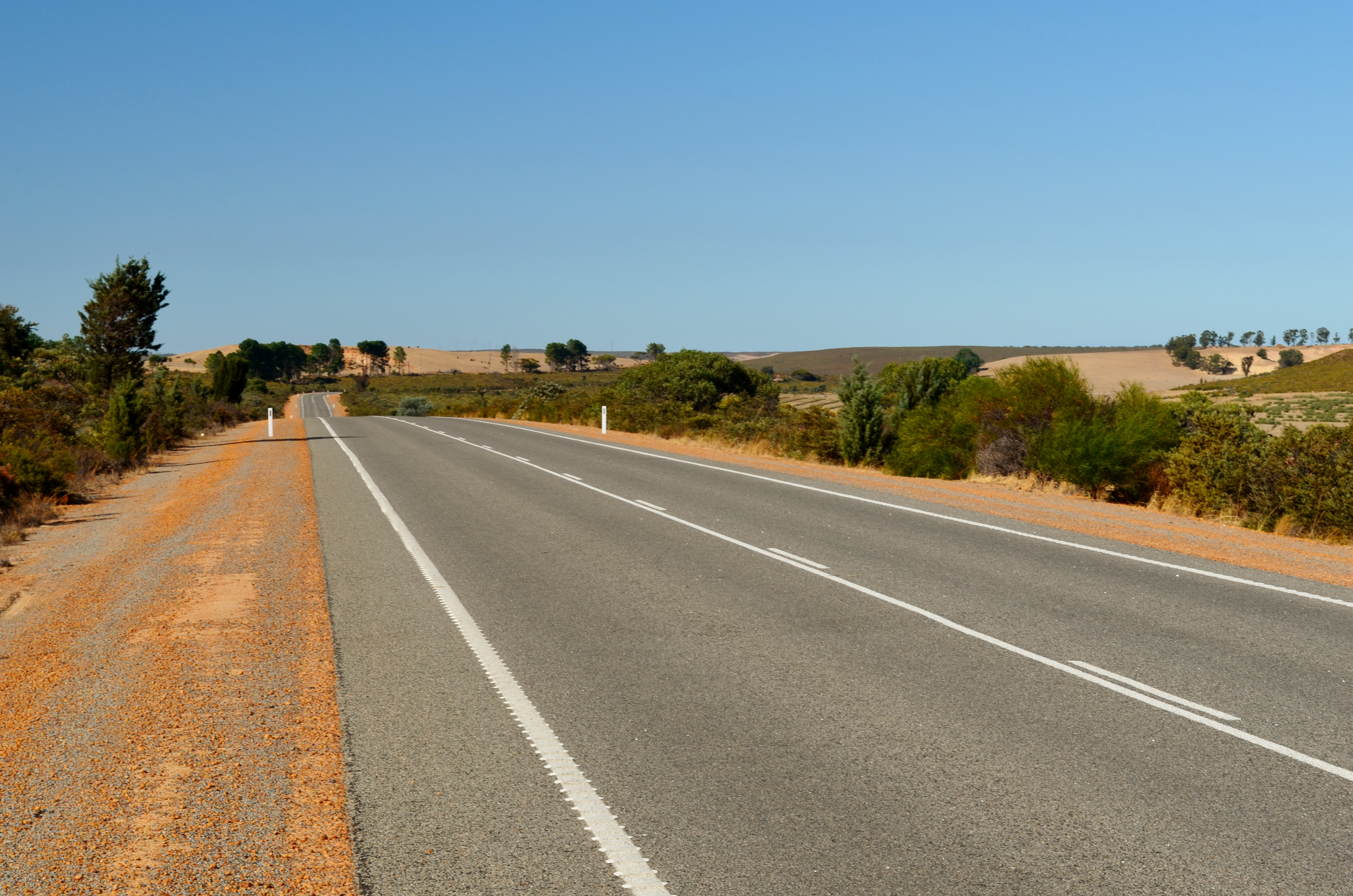
View south near Warradarge, 2014

== Major intersections ==
| LGA | Location | km | mi | Destinations | Notes |
|---|---|---|---|---|---|
| Chittering | Muchea | 0.00 | 0.00 | Great Northern Highway (National Highway 95) northbound / Tonkin Highway southbound (State Route 4) – Perth, Ellenbrook, New Norcia, Meekatharra | Southern terminus at roundabout interchange favouring Great Northern Highway and Tonkin Highway. Continues southeast as Great Northern Highway (National Highway 95 / National Route 1) to Midland and the Swan Valley |
| Chittering | Muchea | 2.20 | 1.37 | Granary Drive – Bullsbrook, Upper Swan | Partial Y interchange. No access from Brand Highway west to Granary Drive south or Granary Drive north to Brand Highway East |
| Gingin | Breera | 22.17 | 13.78 | Cockram Road – Gingin | Former highway alignment |
| Gingin | Granville | 31.47 | 19.55 | Gingin Brook Road – Yanchep, Lancelin | |
| Gingin | Granville | 31.92 | 19.83 | Dewar Road – Gingin, Bindoon | Former highway alignment |
| Gingin | Red Gully | 74.43 | 46.25 | Mogumber Road West – Mogumber Nature Reserve | |
| Gingin | Red Gully | 74.54 | 46.32 | Orange Springs Road – Ledge Point, Lancelin | |
| Dandaragan | Regans Ford | 77.20 | 47.97 | Dandaragan Road – Dandaragan | |
| Dandaragan | Mimegarra | 103.90 | 64.56 | Mimegarra Road west – Wedge Island | |
| Dandaragan | Cataby | 108.72 | 67.56 | Cataby Road – Dandaragan | |
| Dandaragan | Badgingarra | 138.91 | 86.31 | Bibby Road – Cervantes, Nambung National Park (The Pinnacles) | |
| Dandaragan | Badgingarra | 151.64 | 94.22 | North West Road – Badgingarra, Moora | |
| Dandaragan | Boothendarra – Hill River boundary | 174.90 | 108.68 | Jurien Road – Jurien Bay | |
| Coorow | Warradarge | 195.42– 195.66 | 121.43– 121.58 | Coorow–Green Head Road – Green Head, Leeman, Coorow | Staggered T junctions |
| Carnamah | Eneabba | 223.34 | 138.78 | Eneabba–Coolimba Road – Leeman | |
| Carnamah | Eneabba | 225.07 | 139.85 | Eneabba–Three Springs Road – Three Springs, Carnamah | |
| Irwin | Arrowsmith | 273.73 | 170.09 | Indian Ocean Drive (State Route 60) – Jurien Bay | |
| Irwin | Yardarino | 290.78 | 180.68 | Kailis Drive – Dongara, Port Denison, Dongara Eneabba Mingenew Health Service | |
| Irwin | Yardarino | 297.34 | 184.76 | Midlands Road (State Route 116) east – Mingenew, Three Springs | T junction: northbound traffic turns west, southbound traffic turns south |
| Irwin | Dongara | 304.35 | 189.11 | Moreton Terrace – Dongara, Port Denison, Dongara Eneabba Mingenew Health Service | |
| Irwin | Dongara | 305.15 | 189.61 | Waldeck Street – Dongara, Port Denison | |
| Greater Geraldton | Geraldton | 367.87– 367.98 | 228.58– 228.65 | North West Coastal Highway (National Route 1) east / Cathedral Avenue north / John Willcock Link west – Carnarvon, Mount Magnet, Geraldton Airport, Geraldton Regional and St John of God Geraldton hospitals, Geraldton Port | Northern terminus at diamond interchange: continues north as Cathedral Avenue |
1.000 mi = 1.609 km; 1.000 km = 0.621 mi

== The Midlands Road ==
The Midlands Road
- Location: Walebing – Dongara
- Length: 262.86 km (163.33 mi)
- Route number: State Route 116; Tourist Drive 360

While the Geraldton Highway was shifted to a new alignment in 1975, the old route, renamed The Midlands Road, remains a significant part of the road network, with the road included as part of numbered road routes.

The Midlands Road, also known as Midlands Road, is a 263-kilometre-long (163 mi) road in the Mid West and Wheatbelt regions of Western Australia. From Great Northern Highway at Walebing, the road travels west to Moora and then north to Watheroo. The road continues north to Gunyidi, and then travels north-west to Mingenew via Coorow, Carnamah and Three Springs. Beyond Mingenew, it heads west to Dongara, terminating at Brand Highway.

The section from Moora northwards is part of State Route 116, which continues south to Bindoon via Bindoon Moora Road. The section from Walebing to Watheroo National Park is part of Midlands Tourist Way (Tourist Drive 360).

== See also ==
- Highways in Australia
- List of highways in Western Australia
