= Wicherina, Western Australia =

Wicherina
- Suburb
- Interactive map of Wicherina
- Coordinates: 28°41′54″S 114°59′16″E
- Country: Australia
- State: Western Australia
- LGA: City of Greater Geraldton
- Location: 371 km (231 mi) north of Perth; 38 km (24 mi) east of Geraldton

Government
  - State electorate: Geraldton
  - Federal division: Durack

Area
  - Total: 73.8 km^{2} (28.5 sq mi)

Population
  - Total: 4 (SAL 2021)
- Postcode: 6532

Wicherina is a locality in the Mid West region of Western Australia in the local government area of the City of Greater Geraldton. It has a population of 4, according to the 2021 census.
