= Cape Burney, Western Australia =

Coordinates: 28°51′29″S 114°38′35″E

Cape Burney
- Suburb
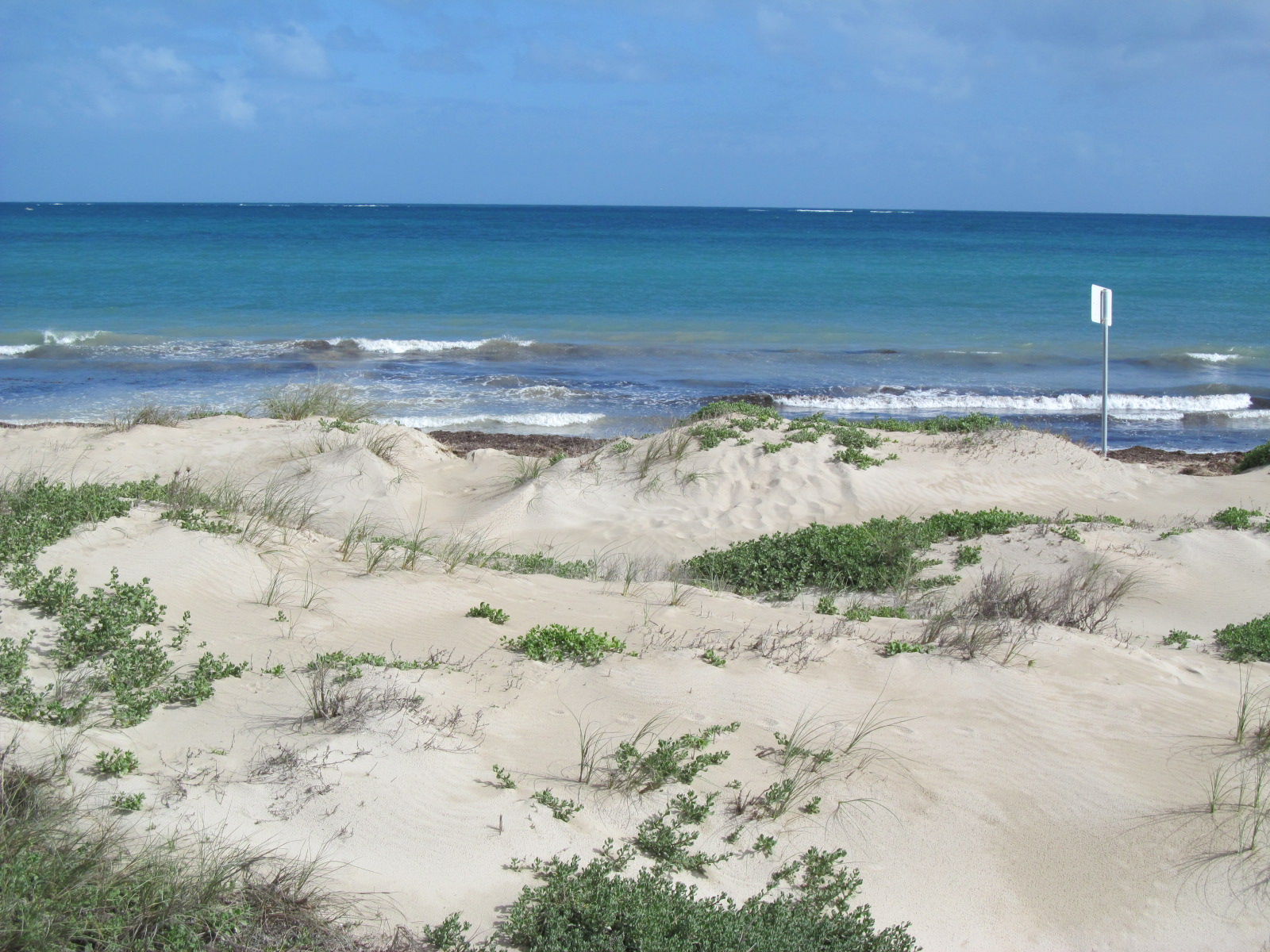
- Southgate Beach
- Country: Australia
- State: Western Australia
- City: Geraldton
- LGA(s): City of Greater Geraldton
- Location: 12 km (7.5 mi) S of Geraldton

Government
  - State electorate(s): Geraldton
  - Federal division(s): Durack

Area
  - Total: 19.1 km^{2} (7.4 sq mi)

Population
  - Total(s): 538 (SAL 2021)
- Postcode: 6532
Suburbs around Cape Burney
Tarcoola Beach	Wandina	Wandina
Indian Ocean	Cape Burney	Rudds Gully
Indian Ocean	Indian Ocean	Greenough

Cape Burney is a coastal town and locality 12 kilometres (7 mi) south of Geraldton, Western Australia at the mouth of the Greenough River. Its local government area is the City of Greater Geraldton. At the 2016 census, Cape Burney had a population of 500.

The locality was gazetted in 1985.

Cape Burney contains a caravan park, popular with surfers and recreational fishermen, as well as the Southgate Dunes to the north of the settlement which separate the settlement from Geraldton.
