= City of Greater Geraldton =

- Local government area
- Interactive map of City of Greater Geraldton
- Coordinates: 28°46′44″S 114°36′25″E
- Country: Australia
- State: Western Australia
- Region: Mid West
- City: Geraldton
- Established: 2011
- Council seat: Geraldton

Government
  - Mayor: Jerry Clune
  - State electorate: Geraldton, Agricultural Region
  - Federal division: Durack

Area
  - Total: 12,625.5 km^{2} (4,874.7 sq mi)

Population
  - Total: 39,489 (LGA 2021)
- Time zone: AWST
- Website: City of Greater Geraldton
LGAs around City of Greater Geraldton
Indian Ocean	Murchison, Chapman Valley	Murchison
Indian Ocean	City of Greater Geraldton	Yalgoo
Indian Ocean	Mingenew, Irwin	Morawa

The City of Greater Geraldton is a local government area in the Mid West region of Western Australia, 424 kilometres (263 mi) north of the state capital, Perth on the Indian Ocean. It covers an area of 12,625.5 square kilometres (4,874.7 sq mi), and its seat of government is the town of Geraldton.

It was established on 1 July 2011 following the amalgamation of the Shire of Mullewa and the City of Geraldton-Greenough, itself a product of a 2007 amalgamation between the City of Geraldton and Shire of Greenough.

== History ==
A recommendation was made to the Minister for Local Government by the Local Government Advisory Board in August 2006 to amalgamate the Shire of Greenough with the City of Geraldton.

The Greenough electors successfully petitioned for a referendum to determine whether amalgamation should proceed. This was held on 2 December 2006, and with a participation rate of 28.74%, a majority of 80% voted against the proposal. However, under the Local Government Act 1995 (clause 10 of Schedule 2.1) as the vote did not attract 50% of registered voters, it did not meet the requirements for a valid poll.

The Liberal government, elected in mid-2008, announced its intentions to amalgamate local governments around the state in line with reforms undertaken elsewhere in Australia. Ultimately, the plan did not succeed, but a number of local governments commenced negotiations for voluntary mergers. One such group included the City, the Shire of Chapman Valley and the Shire of Mullewa. In February 2010, Chapman Valley decided not to proceed, citing community opposition. In December 2010, the Local Government Advisory Board approved the merger. Polls were held in both municipalities, with 72.61% of voters in Geraldton-Greenough and 83.23% of voters in Mullewa voting against the merger. However, both polls failed to reach the minimum 50% required to be a valid poll, and the City of Greater Geraldton came into being on 1 July 2011.

Until the October 2011 elections, the council was administered by five commissioners, led by Ron Yuryevich, the mayor of City of Kalgoorlie-Boulder, and including Ian Carpenter, the mayor of the former City and Nino Messina, the mayor of the former Shire.

== Wards ==
Wards were abolished in 2019 and all twelve councillors represent the area at large.

Prior to 2019, the city was divided into seven wards, each with two councillors, plus a directly elected mayor to serve the entire district.

- Champion Bay Ward – contains Beresford, Spalding and Webberton
- Chapman Ward – contains Bluff Point, Drummond Cove, Glenfield, Sunset Beach and Waggrakine
- Port Ward – contains Geraldton itself, Beachlands and Mahomets Flats
- Tarcoola Ward – contains Mount Tarcoola, Tarcoola Beach and Wandina
- Willcock Ward – contains Karloo, Rangeway, Wonthella and part of Utakarra
- Hills Ward – contains the majority of the former City's land area, and includes the suburbs of Strathalbyn and Woorree
- Mullewa Ward – the entire former Shire of Mullewa.

== Towns, suburbs and localities ==
The towns, suburbs and localities of the City of Greater Geraldton with population and size figures based on the most recent Australian census:

Locality	Population	Area	Map
Ambania	15 (SAL 2021)	327.9 km^{2} (126.6 sq mi)	
Beachlands	1,400 (SAL 2021)	1.4 km^{2} (0.54 sq mi)	
Beresford	1,463 (SAL 2021)	1.4 km^{2} (0.54 sq mi)	
Bluff Point	1,381 (SAL 2021)	1.6 km^{2} (0.62 sq mi)	
Bootenal	48 (SAL 2021)	25.6 km^{2} (9.9 sq mi)	
Bringo	25 (SAL 2021)	40.3 km^{2} (15.6 sq mi)	
Burma Road	3 (SAL 2021)	206.9 km^{2} (79.9 sq mi)	
Cape Burney	538 (SAL 2021)	19.1 km^{2} (7.4 sq mi)	
Deepdale	973 (SAL 2021)	6.4 km^{2} (2.5 sq mi)	
Devils Creek	16 (SAL 2021)	261.7 km^{2} (101.0 sq mi)	
Drummond Cove	1,605 (SAL 2021)	1.6 km^{2} (0.62 sq mi)	
East Chapman	43 (SAL 2021)	78.2 km^{2} (30.2 sq mi)	
Ellendale	25 (SAL 2021)	175.7 km^{2} (67.8 sq mi)	
Eradu	3 (SAL 2021)	41.5 km^{2} (16.0 sq mi)	
Eradu South	5 (SAL 2021)	72.8 km^{2} (28.1 sq mi)	
Georgina	80 (SAL 2021)	71 km^{2} (27 sq mi)	
Geraldton	3,246 (SAL 2021)	4.4 km^{2} (1.7 sq mi)	
Glenfield	1,009 (SAL 2021)	8.3 km^{2} (3.2 sq mi)	
Greenough	344 (SAL 2021)	67.5 km^{2} (26.1 sq mi)	
Houtman Abrolhos	0 (SAL 2021)	2,440.8 km^{2} (942.4 sq mi)	
Karloo	495 (SAL 2021)	3.9 km^{2} (1.5 sq mi)	
Kojarena	21 (SAL 2021)	50.6 km^{2} (19.5 sq mi)	
Mahomets Flats	806 (SAL 2021)	0.9 km^{2} (0.35 sq mi)	
Meru	219 (SAL 2021)	4.4 km^{2} (1.7 sq mi)	
Minnenooka	40 (SAL 2021)	108.4 km^{2} (41.9 sq mi)	
Moonyoonooka	286 (SAL 2021)	158.9 km^{2} (61.4 sq mi)	
Moresby	944 (SAL 2021)	26 km^{2} (10 sq mi)	
Mount Hill	41 (SAL 2016)	43.3 km^{2} (16.7 sq mi)	
Mount Tarcoola	3,257 (SAL 2021)	2.2 km^{2} (0.85 sq mi)	
Mullewa	356 (SAL 2021)	415.1 km^{2} (160.3 sq mi)	
Narngulu	44 (SAL 2021)	25.2 km^{2} (9.7 sq mi)	
Northern Gully	10 (SAL 2021)	61.2 km^{2} (23.6 sq mi)	
Nunierra	22 (SAL 2021)	2,388 km^{2} (922 sq mi)	
Pindar	13 (SAL 2021)	2,175.3 km^{2} (839.9 sq mi)	
Rangeway	1,871 (SAL 2021)	1.8 km^{2} (0.69 sq mi)	
Rudds Gully	238 (SAL 2021)	18.6 km^{2} (7.2 sq mi)	
Sandsprings	9 (SAL 2016)	36.7 km^{2} (14.2 sq mi)	
South Greenough	116 (SAL 2021)	64.5 km^{2} (24.9 sq mi)	
Spalding	1,992 (SAL 2021)	4.4 km^{2} (1.7 sq mi)	
Strathalbyn	1,165 (SAL 2021)	1.7 km^{2} (0.66 sq mi)	
Sunset Beach	1,558 (SAL 2021)	1.9 km^{2} (0.73 sq mi)	
Tarcoola Beach	1,360 (SAL 2021)	1.3 km^{2} (0.50 sq mi)	
Tardun	23 (SAL 2021)	632.6 km^{2} (244.2 sq mi)	
Tenindewa	54 (SAL 2021)	723.1 km^{2} (279.2 sq mi)	
Tibradden	3 (SAL 2021)	46.1 km^{2} (17.8 sq mi)	
Utakarra	1,467 (SAL 2021)	4.9 km^{2} (1.9 sq mi)	
Waggrakine *	2,679 (SAL 2021)	31.2 km^{2} (12.0 sq mi)	
Walkaway	222 (SAL 2021)	113.1 km^{2} (43.7 sq mi)	
Wandina	4,375 (SAL 2021)	3.4 km^{2} (1.3 sq mi)	
Webberton	158 (SAL 2021)	2.5 km^{2} (0.97 sq mi)	
West Casuarinas	29 (SAL 2021)	684.4 km^{2} (264.2 sq mi)	
West End	536 (SAL 2021)	2.3 km^{2} (0.89 sq mi)	
Wicherina	4 (SAL 2021)	73.8 km^{2} (28.5 sq mi)	
Wicherina South	0 (SAL 2016)	69.5 km^{2} (26.8 sq mi)	
Wongoondy	29 (SAL 2021)	501.1 km^{2} (193.5 sq mi)	
Wonthella	1,711 (SAL 2021)	3.7 km^{2} (1.4 sq mi)	
Woorree	1,295 (SAL 2021)	5 km^{2} (1.9 sq mi)	

- (* indicates locality is only partially located within the city)

== Population ==
The population of Greater Geraldton grew from 34,019 in 2001 to 38,634 at the 2016 census, representing an increase of 14%. Unemployment in Greater Geraldton at the census was estimated at 8.8%, compared to 7.8% in Western Australia and 6.9% nationally.

The historical populations of the area which formed Geraldton-Greenough were:

Year	Population	Geraldton	Greenough	Mullewa
1921	6,365	4,174	1,375	816
1933	8,162	4,984	1,556	1,622
1947	8,864	5,972	1,567	1,325
1954	11,337	8,309	1,371	1,657
1961	13,842	10,894	1,321	1,627
1966	15,544	12,125	1,594	1,825
1971	18,887	15,118	1,920	1,849
1976	22,501	17,663	2,979	1,859
1981	25,356	19,096	4,612	1,648
1986	27,176	19,923	5,798	1,455
1991	29,537	20,521	7,626	1,390
1996	31,237	19,724	10,337	1,176
2001	32,196	19,179	11,927	1,090
2006	33,372	18,916	13,545	911

== Heritage-listed places ==
As of 2023, 744 places are heritage-listed in the City of Greater Geraldton, of which 86 are on the State Register of Heritage Places.
