= Rudds Gully, Western Australia =

Rudds Gully
- Suburb
- Coordinates: 28°50′35″S 114°38′38″E
- Country: Australia
- State: Western Australia
- City: Geraldton
- LGA(s): City of Greater Geraldton
- Location: 9 km (5.6 mi) SSE of Geraldton

Government
  - State electorate(s): Geraldton
  - Federal division(s): Durack

Area
  - Total: 18.6 km^{2} (7.2 sq mi)

Population
  - Total(s): 238 (SAL 2021)
- Postcode: 6532
Suburbs around Rudds Gully
Wandina	Karloo	Narngulu
Cape Burney	Rudds Gully	Narngulu
Cape Burney		Bootenal

Rudds Gully is a locality 9 kilometres (5.6 mi) south-southeast of Geraldton, Western Australia. Its local government area is the City of Greater Geraldton.
