= Mahomets Flats, Western Australia =

Mahomets Flats
- Suburb
- Coordinates: 28°47′31″S 114°36′50″E
- Country: Australia
- State: Western Australia
- City: Geraldton
- LGA(s): City of Greater Geraldton
- Location: 2 km (1.2 mi) S of Geraldton

Government
  - State electorate(s): Geraldton
  - Federal division(s): Durack

Area
  - Total: 0.9 km^{2} (0.35 sq mi)

Population
  - Total(s): 806 (SAL 2021)
- Postcode: 6530
Suburbs around Mahomets Flats
Beachlands	Geraldton	Geraldton
Beachlands	Mahomets Flats	Mount Tarcoola
Indian Ocean	Tarcoola Beach	Mount Tarcoola

Mahomets Flats is an inner southern coastal suburb of Geraldton, Western Australia in the local government area of the City of Greater Geraldton.

The suburb was gazetted in 1972.

== Geography ==
Mahomets Flats is located 2 kilometres (1.2 mi) south of Geraldton's central business district, and is accessed via Brand Highway. It is bounded on the southwest by the Indian Ocean, on the north by the freight railway, on the east by Keane Drive and Brand Highway, and on the south by Olive Street.

== Demographics ==
In the 2006 census, Mahomets Flats had a population of 863.

Mahomets Flats residents had a median age of 33 — below the regional average of 35 — and median incomes were average for the region — $541 per week compared with $461 per week. The population of Mahomets Flats was predominantly Australian-born — 80.4% as at the 2006 census — while 3.36% were born in the United Kingdom. 6.91% reported one or more parents of Italian birth.
