= Greenough River =

River in Western Australia

Coordinates: 28°51′00″S 114°38′00″E

Location
- Country: Australia

Physical characteristics
- Source
  - location: Jingemarra Station
  - elevation: 391 metres (1,283 ft)
- Mouth
  - location: Cape Burney
- Length: 340 km (210 mi)
- Basin size: 13,200 km^{2} (5,100 sq mi)

The Greenough River /ˈɡrɛnəf/ is a river in the Mid West region of Western Australia.

== Course ==
Greenough River has its headwaters near Woojalong Hills on the Yilgarn Plateau. It runs in a south-westerly direction through deep valleys for approximately 340 kilometres (211 mi), passing through the Waterloo Ranges before descending to the coastal plain. A few kilometres from the sea it is obstructed by dunes, and turns to the north-west, running along a dune swale parallel with the coast for about 35 km before finally discharging into the Indian Ocean at Cape Burney, about 9 kilometres (6 mi) south of Geraldton, Western Australia.

The ten tributaries that contribute to the Greenough are Woojalong Brook, Woolbarka Brook, Bangemall Creek, Urawa River, Kolanadgy Gully, Nangerwalla Creek, Wooderarrung River, Wandin Creek, Kockatea Creek and Wicherina Brook.

The lower reaches of the Greenough are estuarine; how far upriver the estuary extends is not certain, but probably about 7 km to near Bootenal Springs. The river mouth is barred from the ocean by a sandbar that breaks only in periods of strong flow. Once open, it usually remains open for several months. The bar has now been reinforced with brushwood on the northern side, to force the bar to open only on the southern side, where the adjacent dune is more stable.

Evidence from wind gaps suggests that, thousands of years ago, the Greenough River turned to the north-west a few kilometres further from the coast than it does at present, at the present-day site of Walkaway. It then ran along the inside of a limestone ridge, following what is now the path of the Geraldton–Dongara railway line, to the vicinity of Rudds Gully. Both watercourses then flowed north to discharge into the Chapman River. Later, Rudds Gully cut its own path to the ocean, and the Greenough River discharged into it; and later still, the Greenough cut its own path through the limestone ridge at Walkaway, thus forming its own course.

The well-documented strong winds at Greenough have resulted in large mobile dune systems both to the south and north of the Greenough River mouth. Both are gradually moving northwards, and it is estimated that the southern dune will reach the mouth of the Greenough around 2045, at which point the Greenough may well become even more prone to flooding, or be forced to change its course.

== Hydrology ==
The river is dry most of the time, but has a number of permanent pools such as Bootenal Spring. However, the entire basin is prone to severe flooding which has periodically devastated local farming communities. The worst on record occurred in 1888: over 50 square kilometres (19 sq mi) was flooded; the water was over 5 metres (16 ft) deep south of Greenough; four people were drowned and many financially ruined; and ultimately the town of Greenough was abandoned.

Another flood occurred in 1953 with the river being reported as 100 yards (91 m) past the width of the floods in 1883. An 8 feet (2 m) wall of water washed down the river then steadily rose until it was 20 feet (6 m) high, completely covering the bridge near Walkaway, Western Australia. The 1953 flood was the biggest in 30 years.

The river water is eutrophic and sediment-laden, and there is evidence that this has affected the ecology of the area, with migratory wading birds no longer visiting the floodplain in numbers as large as previously.

== History ==
The Greenough River was named on 8 April 1839 by the explorer George Grey, while on his second disastrous expedition along the Western Australian coast, after George Bellas Greenough, President of the Royal Geographical Society in 1837 at the time Grey's expedition was equipped.
