= Minnenooka, Western Australia =

Minnenooka
- Town
- Coordinates: 28°49′27″S 114°54′8″E
- Country: Australia
- State: Western Australia
- LGA(s): City of Greater Geraldton

Government
  - State electorate(s): Geraldton
  - Federal division(s): Durack

Area
  - Total: 108.4 km^{2} (41.9 sq mi)

Population
  - Total(s): 40 (SAL 2021)
- Postcode: 6532

Minnenooka is a rural locality in the City of Greater Geraldton, in the Mid West region of Western Australia. The locality is named for Minnenooka Station, established by Captain George Faulkner Wilkinson (68th Durham Light Infantry) in 1868.

== See also ==
- Harold Arthur Faulkner Wilkinson
