= Sunset Beach, Western Australia =

Sunset Beach
- Suburb
- Coordinates: 28°43′23″S 114°37′23″E
- Country: Australia
- State: Western Australia
- City: Geraldton
- LGA(s): City of Greater Geraldton
- Location: 6 km (3.7 mi) N of Geraldton

Government
  - State electorate(s): Geraldton
  - Federal division(s): Durack

Area
  - Total: 1.9 km^{2} (0.73 sq mi)

Population
  - Total(s): 1,558 (SAL 2021)
- Postcode: 6530
Suburbs around Sunset Beach
		Glenfield
Indian Ocean	Sunset Beach	Glenfield
	Bluff Point	Spalding

Sunset Beach is an outer northern coastal suburb of Geraldton, Western Australia. Its local government area is the City of Greater Geraldton.

The suburb was gazetted in 1977.

== Geography ==
Sunset Beach is bounded by the Chapman River to the south, Chapman Road to the east and the Indian Ocean to the west.

== Demographics ==
In the 2006 census, Sunset Beach had a population of 1,043.

Sunset Beach residents had a median age of 37, and median incomes were average for the Geraldton region — $473 per week compared with $461 per week. The population of Sunset Beach was predominantly Australian-born - 78.1% as at the 2006 census - and 4.5% of residents identified as Indigenous Australians. 5.18% were born in the United Kingdom.

The most popular religious affiliations in descending order in the 2006 census were Anglican, Roman Catholic, no religion and Uniting.
