= Wonthella, Western Australia =

Wonthella
- Suburb
- Coordinates: 28°45′50″S 114°37′44″E
- Country: Australia
- State: Western Australia
- City: Geraldton
- LGA(s): City of Greater Geraldton
- Location: 3 km (1.9 mi) NE of Geraldton

Government
  - State electorate(s): Geraldton
  - Federal division(s): Durack

Area
  - Total: 3.7 km^{2} (1.4 sq mi)

Population
  - Total(s): 1,711 (SAL 2021)
- Postcode: 6530
Suburbs around Wonthella
Beresford	Webberton	Strathalbyn
Geraldton	Wonthella	Woorree
Geraldton	Rangeway	Utakarra

Wonthella is an inner northern suburb of Geraldton, Western Australia. Its local government area is the City of Greater Geraldton.

The suburb was gazetted in 1972.

In the 2011 census, Wonthella had a population of 1,714.
