= Wandina, Western Australia =

Wandina
- Suburb
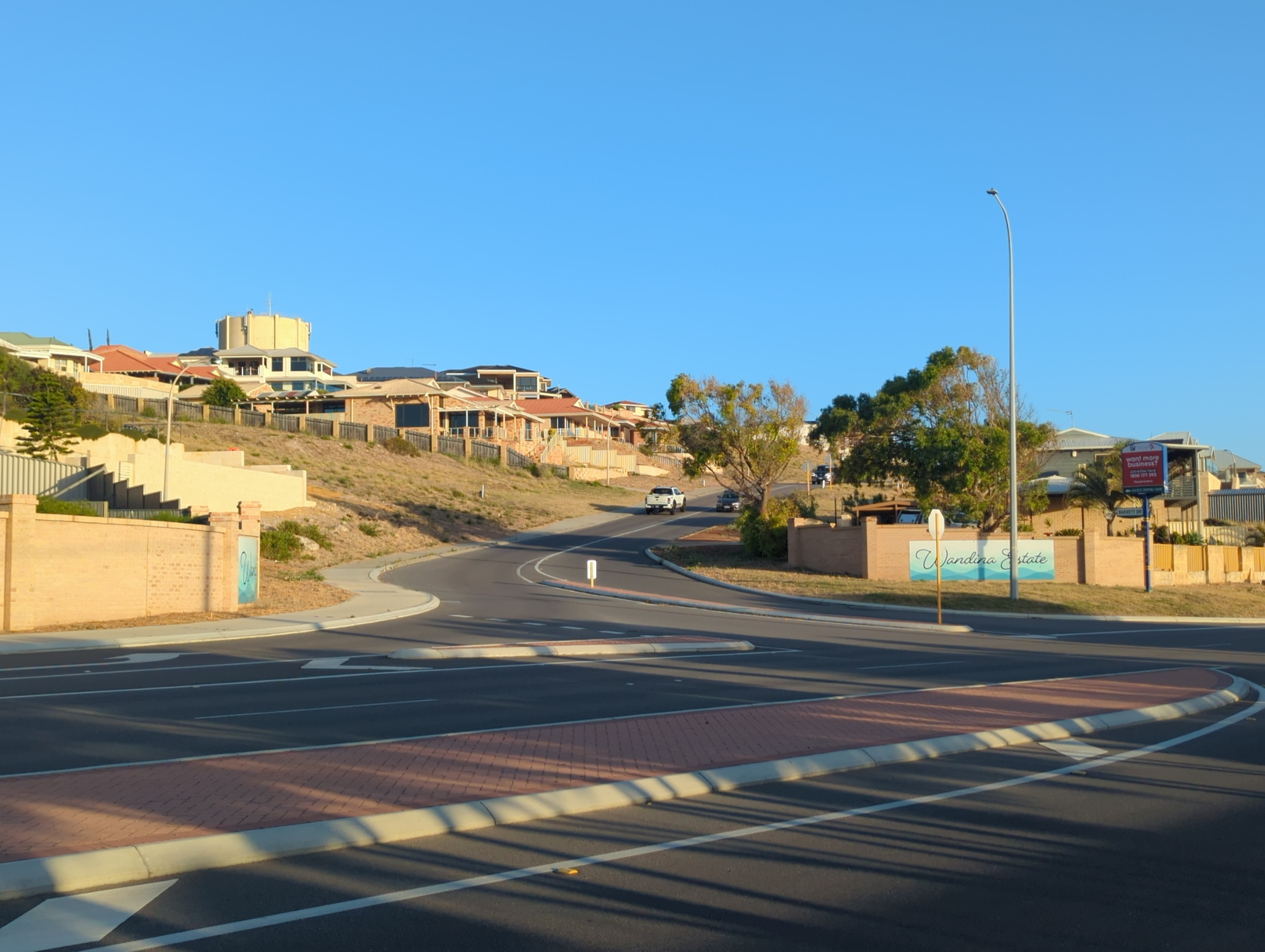

- Coordinates: 28°49′26″S 114°38′06″E
- Country: Australia
- State: Western Australia
- City: Geraldton
- LGA(s): City of Greater Geraldton
- Location: 7 km (4.3 mi) S of Geraldton

Government
  - State electorate(s): Geraldton
  - Federal division(s): Durack

Area
  - Total: 3.4 km^{2} (1.3 sq mi)
- Elevation: 43.8 m (144 ft)

Population
  - Total(s): 4,375 (SAL 2021)
- Postcode: 6530
Suburbs around Wandina
Tarcoola Beach	Mount Tarcoola	Karloo
Tarcoola Beach	Wandina	Rudds Gully
Cape Burney	Cape Burney	Rudds Gully

Wandina is an outer southern suburb of Geraldton, Western Australia. Its local government area is the City of Greater Geraldton.

The suburb was gazetted in 1985.

== Geography ==
Wandina is located at the southern extremity of Geraldton's metropolitan area, and extends south-southeast from Mount Tarcoola along the eastern side of Brand Highway.

== Demographics ==
In the 2006 census, Wandina had a population of 1,352, up from 898 (33.58%) at the 2001 census.

Wandina residents had a median age of 32, and median incomes were above-average for the region — $651 per week compared with $461 per week. Key occupations of Wandina residents (2001) were retail (17%), property and business services, education, personal services and construction. The population of Wandina was predominantly Australian-born - 82.9% as at the 2001 census - while 4.70% were born in the United Kingdom. 6.37% reported one or more parents of Italian birth.
