= Spalding, Western Australia =

Spalding
- Suburb
- Coordinates: 28°44′24″S 114°37′55″E
- Country: Australia
- State: Western Australia
- City: Geraldton
- LGA(s): City of Greater Geraldton
- Location: 5 km (3.1 mi) NE of Geraldton

Government
  - State electorate(s): Geraldton
  - Federal division(s): Durack

Area
  - Total: 4.4 km^{2} (1.7 sq mi)

Population
  - Total(s): 1,992 (SAL 2021)
- Postcode: 6530
Suburbs around Spalding
Sunset Beach	Waggrakine	Moresby
Bluff Point	Spalding	Moresby
Beresford	Webberton	Strathalbyn

Spalding is a northeastern suburb of Geraldton, Western Australia. Its local government area is the City of Greater Geraldton.

The suburb was gazetted in 1979.

== Geography ==
Spalding is located 5 kilometres (3.1 mi) northeast of Geraldton's central business district and is bounded by North West Coastal Highway to the west, Bedford and Koojarra Streets to the south and the extent of the Chapman River Regional Park to the north and east. The Chapman River flows through the suburb.

== Demographics ==
In the 2006 census, Spalding had a population of 2,484.

== Facilities ==
Eadon Clarke Sports Centre and the Spalding Park Golf Course are within the suburb.

Matthew Lloyd White is standing president of the Spalding Park Golf Club.

Professional Golfer Vu Phan PGA is a regular of the golf course.
