= Bluff Point, Western Australia =

Bluff Point
- Suburb
- Coordinates: 28°44′06″S 114°37′23″E
- Country: Australia
- State: Western Australia
- City: Geraldton
- LGA(s): City of Greater Geraldton
- Location: 5 km (3.1 mi) N of Geraldton

Government
  - State electorate(s): Geraldton
  - Federal division(s): Durack

Area
  - Total: 1.6 km^{2} (0.62 sq mi)

Population
  - Total(s): 1,381 (SAL 2021)
- Postcode: 6530
Suburbs around Bluff Point
	Sunset Beach	Spalding
Indian Ocean	Bluff Point	Spalding
	Beresford	Webberton

Bluff Point is a northern coastal suburb of Geraldton, Western Australia. Its local government area is the City of Greater Geraldton.

The suburb was gazetted in 1972.

== Geography ==
Bluff Point is located 5 kilometres (3 mi) north of Geraldton's central business district on the south bank of the Chapman River, between the North West Coastal Highway and the Indian Ocean.

== Demographics ==
In the 2006 census, Bluff Point had a population of 1,319.

Bluff Point residents had a median age of 46, well above the Geraldton median of 35, and 25.4% of residents were aged 65 or over. The median individual income was above average for the region — $523 per week compared with $461 per week. The population of Bluff Point was predominantly Australian-born - 80.7% as at the 2006 census - while 5.61% were born in the United Kingdom. 3.78% reported one or more parents of Italian birth. In the 2006 census, 2.81% of residents identified as Indigenous Australians.

The most common religious affiliations in descending order in the 2001 census were Roman Catholic, Anglican, no religion and Uniting.

== Facilities ==
Bluff Point contains a recreation ground, community shopping centre, primary school, a CWA and several retirement homes. Geraldton Camp School and St Lawrence's School are located within the suburb.
