= Utakarra, Western Australia =

Utakarra
- Suburb
- Coordinates: 28°46′48″S 114°38′46″E
- Country: Australia
- State: Western Australia
- City: Geraldton
- LGA(s): City of Greater Geraldton
- Location: 5 km (3.1 mi) E of Geraldton

Government
  - State electorate(s): Geraldton
  - Federal division(s): Durack

Area
  - Total: 4.9 km^{2} (1.9 sq mi)

Population
  - Total(s): 1,467 (SAL 2021)
- Postcode: 6530
Suburbs around Utakarra
| Wonthella | Woorree | Deepdale |
| Rangeway | Utakarra | Deepdale |
| Rangeway | Karloo | Narngulu |

Utakarra is an eastern suburb of Geraldton, Western Australia. Its local government area is the City of Greater Geraldton. Prior to 1 July 2007, it was the seat of government of the Shire of Greenough.

The suburb was gazetted in 1972.

In the 2006 census, Utakarra had a population of 971.

Utakarra Racecourse

The Geraldton Turf Club, established 1861, operates the Utakarra Racecourse on Eastward Rd.

San Sprito Chapel

The San Spirito Chapel was built in 1936. It was designed and decorated by Monsignor John Hawes. The chapel is located in the Utakarra cemetery.
