= Rangeway, Western Australia =

Rangeway
- Suburb
- Interactive map of Rangeway
- Coordinates: 28°46′59″S 114°37′48″E
- Country: Australia
- State: Western Australia
- City: Geraldton
- LGA: City of Greater Geraldton
- Location: 3 km (1.9 mi) SE of Geraldton

Government
  - State electorate: Geraldton
  - Federal division: Durack

Area
  - Total: 1.8 km^{2} (0.69 sq mi)

Population
  - Total: 1,871 (SAL 2021)
- Postcode: 6530
Suburbs around Rangeway
Geraldton	Wonthella	Utakarra
Geraldton	Rangeway	Utakarra
Mount Tarcoola	Mount Tarcoola	Karloo

Rangeway is an inner eastern suburb of Geraldton, Western Australia. Its local government area is the City of Greater Geraldton.

The suburb was gazetted in 1972.

== Geography ==
Rangeway is located 3 kilometres (2 mi) southeast of Geraldton's central business district. It is bounded on the west by the North West Coastal Highway and Scott Road, on the north by Eastward Road, and on the east by Blencowe Road and Assen Street.

== Demographics ==
In the 2006 census, Rangeway had a population of 2,303.

Rangeway residents had a median age of 28, and the median individual income was well below average for the Geraldton region — $328 per week compared with $461 per week. The population of Rangeway was predominantly Australian-born - 76.1% as at the 2006 census - while 3.82% were born in the United Kingdom. In the 2006 census, 21.6% of residents identified as Indigenous Australians.

The most popular religious affiliations in descending order in the 2006 census were no religion, Roman Catholic, Anglican, and Uniting. 36.9% of Rangeway residents lived in Department of Housing accommodation.
