= Beachlands, Western Australia =

Beachlands
- Suburb
- Coordinates: 28°47′02″S 114°36′07″E
- Country: Australia
- State: Western Australia
- City: Geraldton
- LGA(s): City of Greater Geraldton
- Location: 2 km (1.2 mi) SW of Geraldton

Government
  - State electorate(s): Geraldton
  - Federal division(s): Durack

Area
  - Total: 1.4 km^{2} (0.54 sq mi)

Population
  - Total(s): 1,400 (SAL 2021)
- Postcode: 6530
Suburbs around Beachlands
		Geraldton
West End	Beachlands	Geraldton
	Indian Ocean	Mahomets Flats

Beachlands is an inner western suburb of Geraldton, Western Australia in the local government area of the City of Greater Geraldton.

The suburb was gazetted in 1972.

== Geography ==
Beachlands is located between Geraldton's central business district and the Port of Geraldton, and is bounded by Augustus Street to the north, Fitzgerald Street to the east, the Indian Ocean to the south and Shenton and Crowther Streets to the east.

== Demographics ==
In the 2006 census, Beachlands had a population of 1,694.

Beachlands residents had a median age of 39, and median incomes were below-average for the region — $361 per week compared with $461 per week. The population of Beachlands was predominantly Australian-born - 76.8% as at the 2006 census - while 6.85% were born in the United Kingdom. 2.48% reported one or more parents of Italian birth. In the 2006 census, 8.03% of residents identified as Indigenous Australians.

The most popular religious affiliations in descending order in the 2006 census were Anglican, no religion, Roman Catholic and Uniting.

== Facilities ==
Beachlands contains a recreation ground, community shopping centre, primary school and a war veterans home. Separation Point Lookout in the suburb's southwest provides views south of Southgate Dunes and overlooking Greys Beach to the west and Mahomets Beach to the southeast.
