= Tarcoola Beach, Western Australia =

Coordinates: 28°48′22″S 114°37′16″E

Tarcoola Beach
- Suburb
- Coordinates
- Country: Australia
- State: Western Australia
- City: Geraldton
- LGA(s): City of Greater Geraldton
- Location: 4 km (2.5 mi) from Geraldton

Government
  - State electorate(s): Geraldton
  - Federal division(s): Durack

Area
  - Total: 1.3 km^{2} (0.50 sq mi)

Population
  - Total(s): 1,360 (SAL 2021)
- Postcode: 6530
Suburbs around Tarcoola Beach
	Mahomets Flats	Mount Tarcoola
Indian Ocean	Tarcoola Beach	Wandina
	Cape Burney	Wandina

Tarcoola Beach is a southern coastal suburb of Geraldton, Western Australia, which falls under the jurisdiction of the local government area of the City of Greater Geraldton.

The suburb was gazetted in 1985-1986.

== Geography ==
Tarcoola Beach is a narrow strip about 3.2 kilometres (2.0 mi) in length, and is located between Brand Highway and the Indian Ocean, at the southern entrance to Geraldton.

== Demographics ==
In the 2006 census, Tarcoola Beach had a population of 1,422.

Tarcoola Beach residents had a median age of 37, and a regionally above-average median individual income — $656 per week, compared with $461 per week. The population of Tarcoola Beach was predominantly Australian-born - 78.9%, as of the 2006 census - while 6.39% were born in the United Kingdom. 6.57% of the local population reported one or more parents of Italian birth, while small numbers of Filipinos were also present.

The most popular religious affiliations in descending order in the 2001 census were Roman Catholic, Anglican, no religion and Uniting.

== Facilities ==
Tarcoola Beach contains a number of accommodation options, including a caravan park and several motels and B&Bs. The suburb contains no schools or shopping facilities, relying in both cases on neighbouring Mount Tarcoola.
