= Greenough, Western Australia =

Greenough
- Town
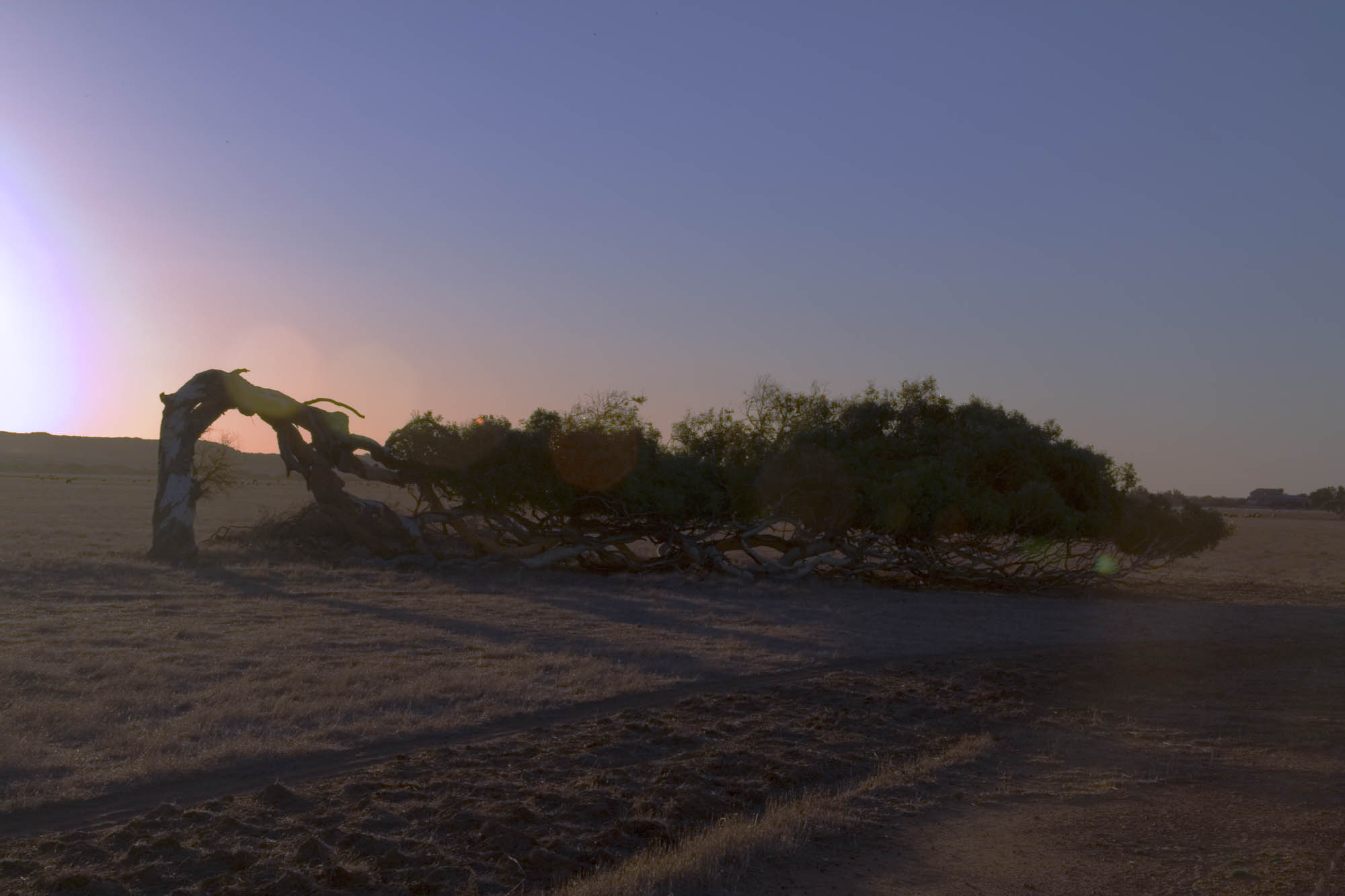
- Leaning tree, Greenough

- Interactive map of Greenough
- Coordinates: 28.944°S 114.744°E
- Country: Australia
- State: Western Australia
- LGA: City of Greater Geraldton
- Location: 403 km (250 mi) NW of Perth; 22 km (14 mi) SE of Geraldton; 40 km (25 mi) NW of Dongara

Government
  - State electorate: Geraldton
  - Federal division: Durack

Area
  - Total: 67.5 km^{2} (26.1 sq mi)
- Elevation: 21 m (69 ft)

Population
  - Total: 344 (SAL 2021)
- Postcode: 6532

Greenough /ˈɡrɛnəf/ is a historical settlement situated in an aluvial floodplain (the Greenough Flats) 400 kilometres (250 mi) north of Perth, Western Australia and 24 kilometres (15 mi) south of Geraldton on the Brand Highway. The settlement's historical buildings are mostly built of local limestone and date to the second half of the 19th century. A sizeable collection of these are owned and managed by the National Trust of Australia. A remarkable feature of the Greenough Flats is its windswept trees, some of which are bent 90 degrees due to the prevailing coastal winds.

The mouth of the Greenough River is about 10 kilometres (6.2 mi) to the north of the town.

== History ==
=== Aboriginal ===
The fertile land was once the home of the Yamatji people, who lived a fairly sedentary life and subsisted on fish and water fowl from the river mouth, shell-fish from the coast and game from the hills. They also cultivated ajeca, a yam-like plant on the river flats.

A popular camping ground was what is now known as Bootenal Springs. It is a permanent source of water and became a place of conflict between the Aboriginal people and the first European settlers.

Bootenal Springs Massacre. In 1854 a group of station hands led by police deputy superintendent John Nicol Drummond attacked the camp. The death toll is believed to be around 300 according to descendants.

Although no evidence of the conflict remains, the site has since been interpreted to remind people of what took place.

=== European ===
The area was first explored by George Edward Grey in 1839, after which he named the area after George Bellas Greenough, the president of the Royal Geographical Society in London. Grey claimed that the area could become "the granary of Western Australia".

In 1851 Augustus Gregory surveyed 12,000 hectares (30,000 acres) of land in the region which became known as the Greenough Flats. That was subdivided into 8.1-hectare (20-acre) and 12-hectare (30-acre) lots with the view to encouraging English settlers who would be more used to the relatively small (by Australian standards) farm sizes. Within a few years, it had developed into a highly successful wheat growing area with a population of over 1,000. Several community centres were created, notably North Greenough, Central Greenough (initially focused on Company Road between Gray's Store and the Hampton Arms Hotel), South Greenough and Bookara.

A series of disasters starting with a major cyclone in 1872 and major flooding in 1888, as well as the discovery of gold in the goldfields, caused the gradual decline and abandonment of the settlement so that by 1900 many of the settlers had left the area, their small farmlets becoming incorporated into larger farming properties. Substantial stone buildings, erected by the early colonists in anticipation of population growth, were underutilised or abandoned. During the course of the 20th century many of these buildings became derelict or fell into ruin. In the years after World War II, motorized transport, television and decline in religious observance caused local institutions to lose their relevance, resulting in the closure of local schools, churches, the Presentation Convent, and police complex. In 2016 the Anglican and Catholic Churches in Central Greenough were the only community institutions established in the 19th century that continued to have an active membership. The Hampton Arms also continues to provide for the social needs of the community.

Following World War II, the historic heritage value of the Greenough Flats gradually came to be recognised. In 1966 the Geraldton Historical Society opened the first local history museum in the Mid West, in the former Maley family homestead at North Greenough. Soon after, the National Trust of Western Australia carried out a survey of heritage places in the region; the work was led by architect and planner Margaret Feilman. The National Trust also began acquiring historic properties on the Greenough Flats, many of which were gifted, with the object of ensuring their conservation. Almost the entire hamlet at Central Greenough was acquired, as well as nearby Clinch's Mill and the miller's residence, Greenough Hotel, Gray's Store, the Wesleyan Methodist Chapel, Temperance Lodge (ruin) and the Anglican Chapel at South Greenough. In the decades that followed, the National Trust invested substantial funds in these places' conservation, work which included the preparation of conservation management plans and archaeological research. The "Greenough Hamlet" has subsequently become a significant heritage tourism destination in the mid-west region. A new Visitor Information Centre was developed at the Greenough Hamlet around 2000.

In 1993, Greenough made national news headlines when a woman and her three young children of this small community were murdered. The killing later featured on the Australian television show Crime Investigation Australia.

On 16 February 1999, a rare annular solar eclipse of magnitude 0.9906 was visible from the area.

In 2006, floodwaters on the Greenough River undermined and caused the collapse of one of the stone pylons of Maley's bridge in Central Greenough. The bridge, which is both historically significant and important for local vehicular movement, was subsequently restored.

In 2013, a disastrous fire gutted Maley's mill and store, one of Greenough's more significant heritage buildings.

== Places of natural and cultural significance ==
Places marked NT are owned and/or managed by the National Trust.

- Leaning tree, west side of Brand Highway north of the Greenough Hamlet.
- Maley's Mill, store and miller's residence - the miller's residence is now a local museum operated by the Community Group of Greenough. The mill is a ruin following a disastrous fire in 2013.
- Greenough cemetery - the final resting place for many of Greenough's pioneers, and a cemetery still used by the community.
- Greenough Hotel (NT) - a former hotel, built in two parts and single storey. Now a stabilised ruin.
- Clinch's Mill (NT) and Cliff Grange (NT) - a partly ruined flour mill and large house of vernacular form, located north-west of the hamlet.
- Greenough Hamlet (NT) - the village of Central Greenough, comprising a collection of mostly stone buildings of the 19th century. The major buildings are the school, police complex, Presentation Convent, St Peter's Roman Catholic Church (not managed by NT), roads board offices, and St Catherine's Anglican Church and Hall. Since becoming a tourist attraction in the 1980s, the hamlet has been stripped of the many ephemeral structures that one would expect to see in a township, including such things as fences, washing lines, water tanks, patches of garden, and sheds; and is conspicuously devoid of the residents, animals and vehicles that would once have imbued the place with life.
- Maley's Bridge (NT) - a convict built bridge of stone piers and timber lintels, forming the southern link between the Brand Highway and Company Road.
- Stone barn (NT) and barn cottage (NT) - a pair of buildings situated immediately south-west of Maley's bridge, typical of the modest cottages and outbuildings erected on small holdings on the Greenough Flats during the 1850s.
- Mount Pleasant - a farmhouse that was the home of the Waldeck family, leading members of the local Wesleyan Methodist community.
- Wesleyan Methodist Chapel (NT) - a church building that has for some time been a ruin without roof cladding, currently devoid of interior fittings. In its ruinous state, the church has featured in many publications documenting Australia's historic heritage - often pictured with the bent tree opposite Gray's Store in the foreground.
- Gray's Store (NT) - a colonial store with adjoining two-storey residence. The store has a large signboard on the northern wall, on which the ghosted form of the sign's original graphics can still be discerned in certain light conditions. Behind the store is an unusual water cistern built of stone with a vaulted roof.
- Temperance Lodge (NT) - the stone ruins of a hall that provided an alternative social venue for those who had sworn themselves off alcohol. It is also known locally as the Certainly Not!. An old well is located near to the lodge.
- Hampton Arms Inn - a two-storey colonial inn, still trading with bar, restaurant and accommodation.
- St James Church (NT) - a small church building on the west side of Brand Highway in South Greenough.
- Hackett's Cottage (NT)

== Tourist attractions ==
=== Wildlife park ===
The Greenough Wildlife & Bird Park (at 449 Company Road) is a locally situated wildlife park open on Fridays and weekends, where visitors can see many Australian native animals (and farm animals) including: kangaroos, koalas, emus, ostrich, camels, alpacas, goats, cows, horses, frogs, snakes, lizards, owls, cockatoos, echidnas, dingoes and a huge saltwater crocodile.

== Gallery ==
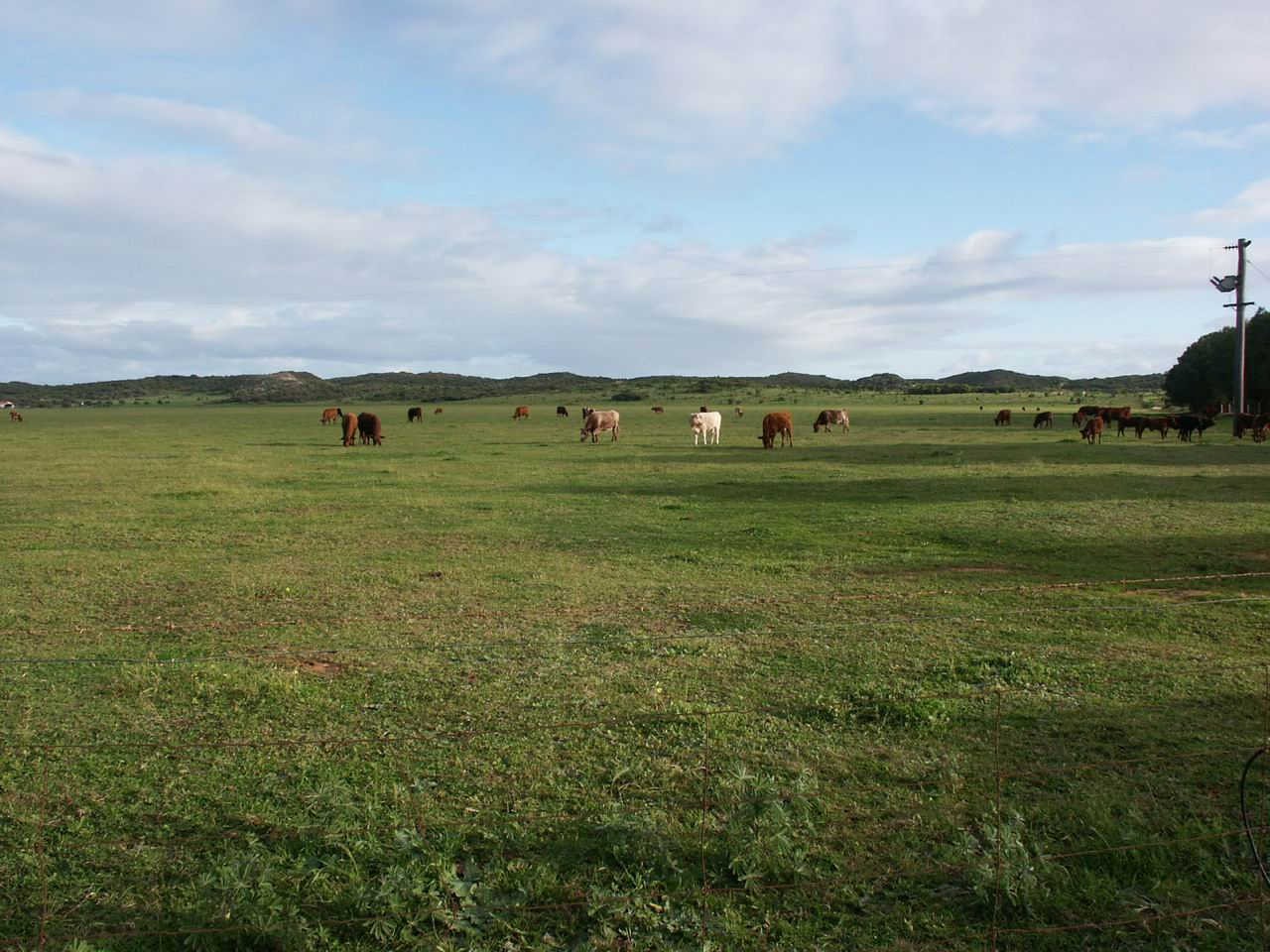
Green fields of Greenough

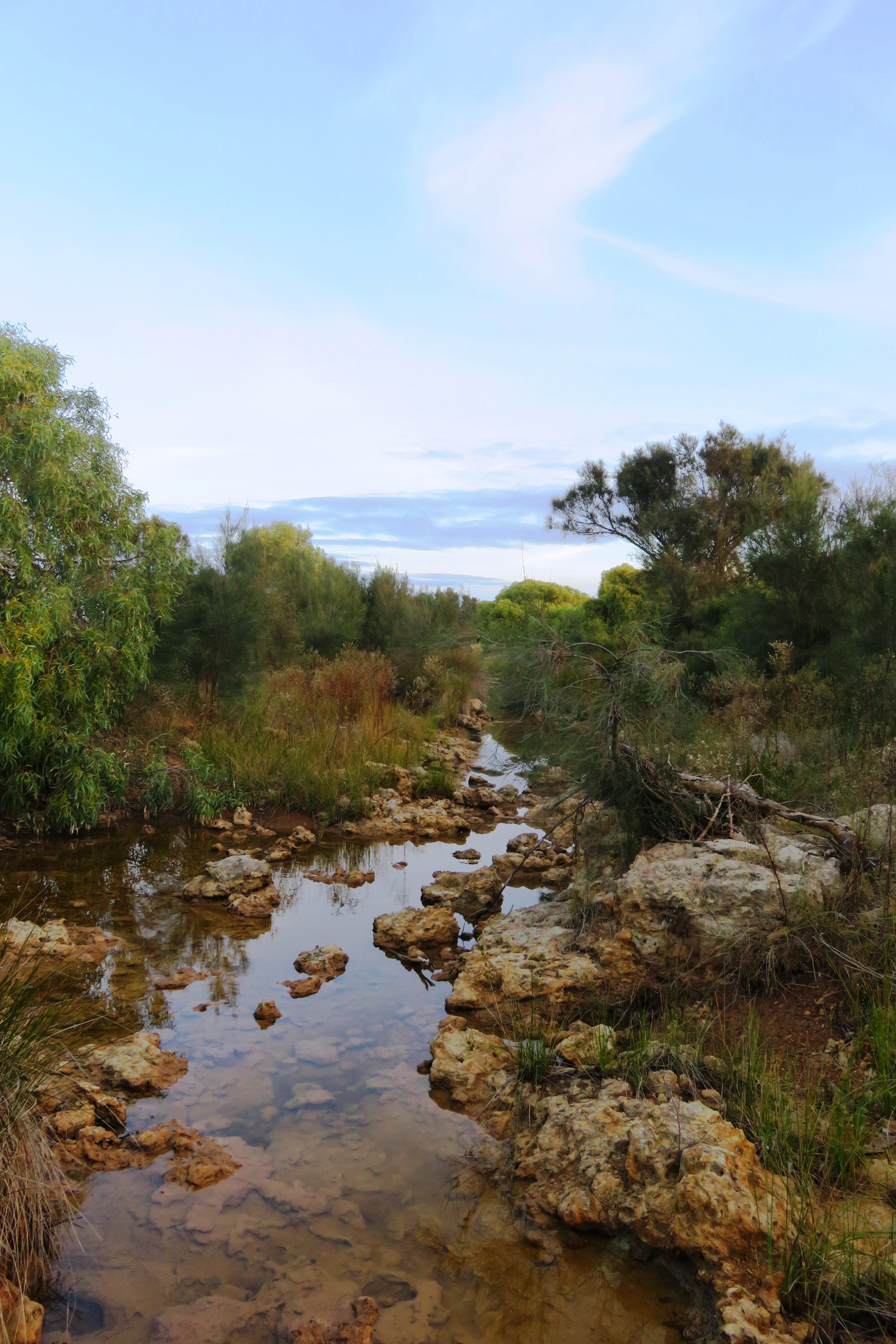
Bootenal Springs

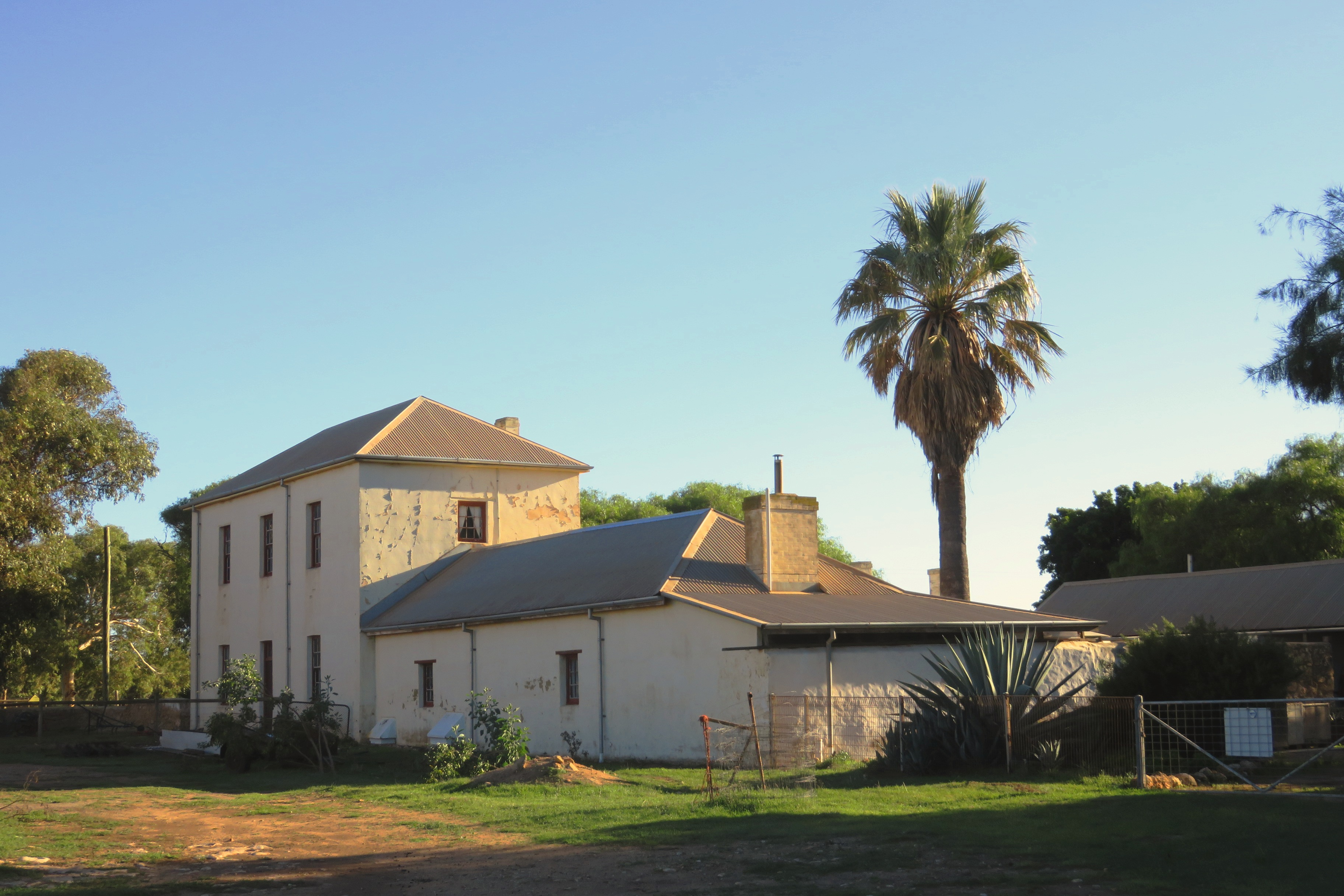
Greenough Museum and Gardens
