= Chapman River =

River in Western Australia

Coordinates: 28°43′43″S 114°37′11″E

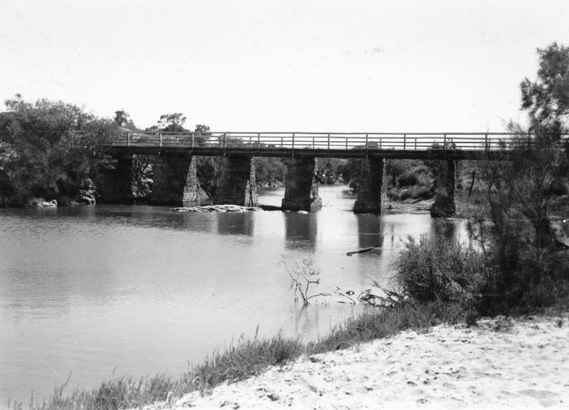
- Bridge over the Chapman River, Geraldton, 1946

Location
- Country: Australia

Physical characteristics
- Source
  - location: Yuna
  - elevation: 270 metres (886 ft)
- Mouth
  - location: Bluff Point
- Length: 105 km (65 mi)
- Basin size: 1,644 km^{2} (635 sq mi)

The Chapman River is a river in the Mid West region of Western Australia.

== Course ==
The river arises on the Victoria Plateau east of Northampton. It flows in a southerly direction, passing through the town of Nabawa in the Shire of Chapman Valley, and continuing south to about the latitude of Geraldton. It then descends to the coastal plain, turning to the west-north-west and disgorging into the Indian Ocean at Bluff Point in Champion Bay. Tributaries of the river include Chapman River East, Skelton Gully, Una Brook and Rushy Gully.

== Hydrology ==
Most of the Chapman River's 1,160 km^{2} catchment consists of cleared agricultural land. This land is heavily fertilised and subject to soil erosion, so the river carries high concentrations of nitrogen, phosphorus and chlorophyll a. This, together with the encroachment of urban areas into the river's riparian zone, has resulted in a degraded river system with eutrophic lower reaches.

The river generally does not flow in summer, but always flows in winter. From the mouth to about 1.5 km upriver, the river is estuarine. This stretch always contains some water. The mouth itself is usually closed by a sandbar, but this opens at the onset of heavy flow, and closes after flow has receded. When the sandbar is open, sea water enters the estuary, mildly affecting its salinity.

During periods of very high rainfall, soils are washed into the river and carried out to sea. Following heavy rains in June and July 1986, it was estimated that the Chapman River washed 39,000 tons of suspended sediment into the ocean, representing the loss of some A$73,000 of soil nitrogen.

== Conservation ==
The Chapman River's riparian zone is managed as part of the Chapman Regional Wildlife Corridor Project, and much of it is afforded some protection by the declaration of regional parks within the zone, such as Spalding Park.

== History ==
The Chapman River was named on 7 April 1839 by the explorer George Grey while on his second disastrous expedition along the Western Australian coast, and was probably named after John Chapman, later a British Conservative Member of Parliament but then deputy chairman of the Western Australian Company. Chapman was a business partner of Grey's friend Sir William Hutt (Chairman of the Western Australian Company and brother of John Hutt, second Governor of Western Australia), after whom Grey had named the nearby Hutt River, two days previously.
