= Mount Tarcoola, Western Australia =

Mount Tarcoola
- Suburb
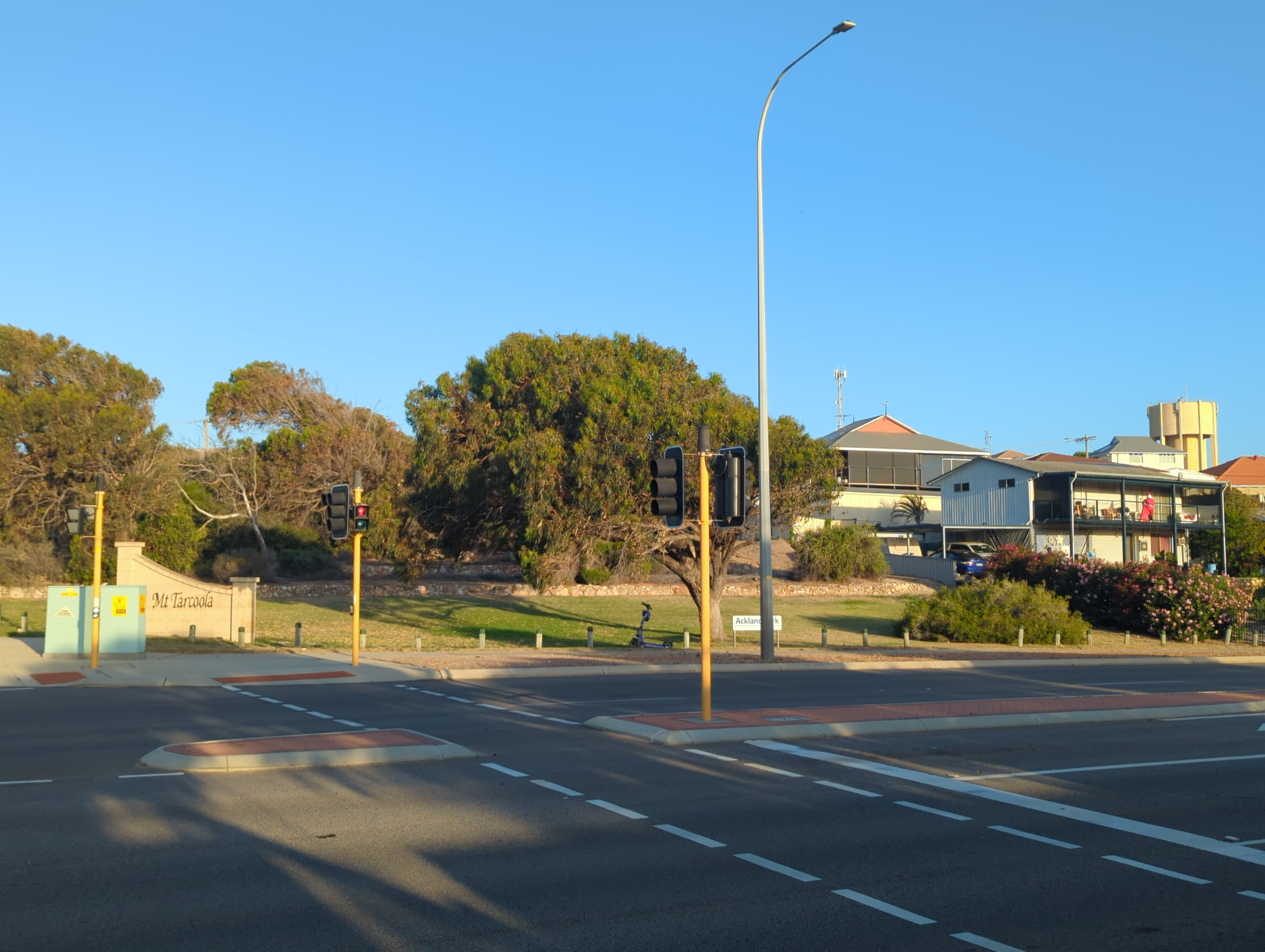

- Coordinates: 28°48′07″S 114°37′34″E
- Country: Australia
- State: Western Australia
- City: Geraldton
- LGA(s): City of Greater Geraldton
- Location: 4 km (2.5 mi) S of Geraldton

Government
  - State electorate(s): Geraldton
  - Federal division(s): Durack

Area
  - Total: 2.2 km^{2} (0.85 sq mi)
- Elevation: 46.7 m (153 ft)

Population
  - Total(s): 3,257 (SAL 2021)
- Postcode: 6530
Suburbs around Mount Tarcoola
Mahomets Flats	Geraldton	Rangeway
Tarcoola Beach	Mount Tarcoola	Karloo
Tarcoola Beach	Wandina	Karloo

Mount Tarcoola is a southern suburb of Geraldton, Western Australia. Its local government area is the City of Greater Geraldton.

The northern part of the suburb was gazetted in 1972 by the Town of Geraldton, and the southern part was gazetted in 1979 by the Shire of Greenough.

== Geography ==
Mount Tarcoola is 3.5 kilometres (2.2 mi) southeast of Geraldton's central business district. It is bounded on the north by North West Coastal Highway, on the west by Brand Highway, and on the south by Barrett Drive.

== Demographics ==
In the 2006 census, Mount Tarcoola had a population of 3,566, representing a growth of 557 people (18.5%) since the 2001 census.

Mount Tarcoola residents had a median age of 34, and the median individual income was $570 per week, compared with $461 per week for the Geraldton region as a whole. The population of Mount Tarcoola was predominantly Australian-born - 82.2% as at the 2006 census - while 5.02% were born in the United Kingdom. A small Cocos Malay population was identified in the suburb, with 2.9% practising Islam and 2.2% speaking Malay at home.
