= Narngulu, Western Australia =

Narngulu
- Suburb
- Coordinates: 28°49′01″S 114°41′31″E
- Country: Australia
- State: Western Australia
- LGA(s): City of Greater Geraldton
- Location: 12 km (7.5 mi) SE of Geraldton
- Established: 1890s

Government
  - State electorate(s): Geraldton
  - Federal division(s): Durack

Area
  - Total: 25.2 km^{2} (9.7 sq mi)

Population
  - Total(s): 44 (SAL 2021)
- Postcode: 6532

Narngulu is an outer suburb of the Western Australian city of Geraldton, and is for the most part an industrial area.

== History ==
In the 1890s the town was known as Mullewa Junction as it was where the Geraldton to Mullewa railway line met the Midland railway line, and the name was gazetted in 1903. By 1905, the town was starting to become confused with Mullewa further east, and the Commissioner of Railways asked for the town to be renamed. The name Crowther, after a local merchant, was objected to by the Postmaster-General's Department, as there was a town named Crowther between Cowra and Young in New South Wales. The name Narngulu, meaning "to remember" in a local Aboriginal dialect, was chosen in 1906.

The Greenough Regional Prison opened here in 1984.

== Rail ==
The Narngulu line has required upgrading due to tonnages carried on the line as early as the 1950s.

The location was part of proposed rail corridors to the Oakajee Port developments, which to date have not eventuated. The Australian Railroad Group currently operate a large rail yard at Narngulu, known as either Narngulu Rail Maintenance facility, or Narngulu East Rail Depot.

Titanium minerals and zircon are processed at the Iluka Resources plant, with coal being railed seven times a fortnight from Collie.
