= Geraldton (suburb) =

- Suburb
- Coordinates: 28.777°S 114.615°E
- Country: Australia
- State: Western Australia
- City: Geraldton
- LGA(s): City of Greater Geraldton
- Established: 1850

Government
  - State electorate(s): Kalgoorlie
  - Federal division(s): O'Connor

Area
  - Total: 4.4 km^{2} (1.7 sq mi)

Population
  - Total(s): 3,246 (SAL 2021)
- Postcode: 6530

Geraldton is the central suburb of the City of Greater Geraldton in the Mid West region of Western Australia.

== Demographics ==
As of the 2021 Australian census, 3,246 people resided in Geraldton, up from 3,148 in the 2016 census. The median age of persons in Golden Gully was 47 years. There were fewer males than females, with 47.2% of the population male and 52.8% female. The average household size was 2 people per household.
