= Geraldton–Mount Magnet Road =

Highway in Western Australia

Geraldton–Mount Magnet Road Western Australia

General information
- Type: Highway
- Length: 335.34 km (208 mi)
- Route number(s): State Route 123

Major junctions
- West end: North West Coastal Highway (National Route 1), Geraldton
- Mullewa–Wubin Road; Morawa–Yalgoo Road
- East end: Great Northern Highway (National Highway 95), Mount Magnet

Location(s)
- Major settlements: Mullewa, Pindar, Wurarga, Yalgoo, Edah

Highway system
- Highways in Australia; National Highway • Freeways in Australia; Highways in Western Australia

Geraldton–Mount Magnet Road is a 335-kilometre-long (208 mi) major regional road in the Mid West region of Western Australia, starting in Utakarra in Geraldton's eastern suburbs, and terminating 333 kilometres (207 mi) east-northeast at Great Northern Highway near the mining town of Mount Magnet. The road is signed as State Route 123, is a two-lane single carriageway for its entire length, and is a major traffic route which is regularly used by heavy vehicles and mine/grain road trains.

The construction of Stage Two of the Geraldton Southern Transport Corridor is expected to remove considerable traffic from the Geraldton end of the road.

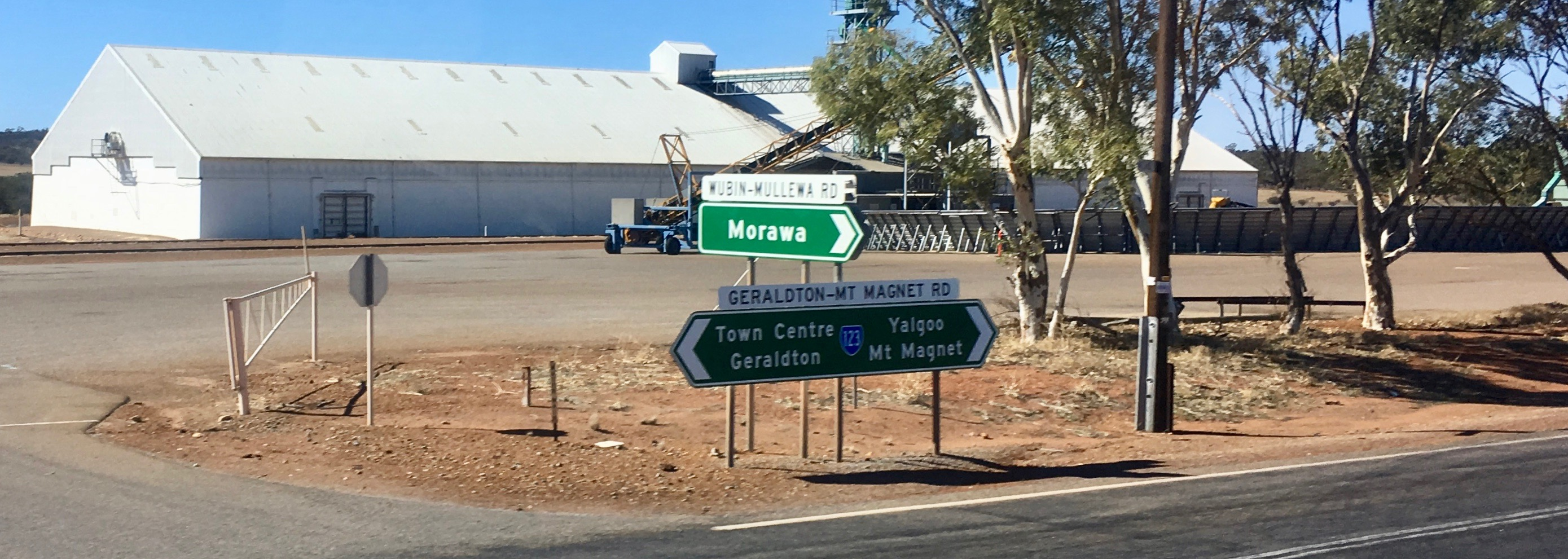

== History ==
Prior to 2010, Geraldton–Mount Magnet Road ran through Utakarra, Rangeway and Geraldton's main industrial area and terminated at North West Coastal Highway around 450 meters north of its current intersection. Construction of a bypass began around 2007-2008 and the 8.3-kilometre-long (5.2 mi) section of the bypass opened in February 2010.

== Description ==
Geraldton–Mount Magnet Road commences in Utakarra as a continuation of Utakarra Road, which carries State Route 123 from North West Coastal Highway 1.8 kilometres (1.1 mi) to the southwest. It heads east towards Geraldton Airport, then east-northeast through the flat-topped Moresby Ranges on its way towards the agricultural town of Mullewa. It then travels in a generally straight line through Yalgoo and ends at the Great Northern Highway 3 kilometres (2 mi) south of Mount Magnet.

== Major intersections ==
| LGA | Location | km | mi | Destinations | Notes |
|---|---|---|---|---|---|
| Greater Geraldton | Mount Tarcoola | 0.0 | 0.0 | North West Coastal Highway (National Route 1) – Geraldton, Perth, Northampton, Carnarvon, Geraldton Regional and St John of God Geraldton hospitals, Geraldton Port | Southwestern terminus at signalised T-intersection |
| Greater Geraldton | Meru-Narngulu boundary | 5.6 | 3.5 | Edward Road – Utakarra, Woorree, Walkaway | |
| Greater Geraldton | Moonyoonooka-Meru-Deepdale tripoint | 7.7 | 4.8 | Masters Road – Utakarra, Geraldton | Connects to the previous alignment, now known as Horwood Road |
| Greater Geraldton | Moonyoonooka | 8.1 | 5.0 | Gordon Garratt Drive - Geraldton Airport | |
| Greater Geraldton | Mullewa | 93.3 | 58.0 | Mingenew-Mullewa Road – Mingenew | |
| Greater Geraldton | Mullewa | 97.1 | 60.3 | Warren Road – Murchison, Gascoyne Junction | |
| Greater Geraldton | Mullewa | 97.2 | 60.4 | Wubin-Mullewa Road – Morawa, Perenjori, Wubin | |
| Yalgoo | Yalgoo | 213 | 132 | Morawa-Yalgoo Road – Morawa | |
| Mount Magnet | Mount Magnet | 335 | 208 | Great Northern Highway (National Highway 95) – Meekatharra, Mount Magnet, Paynes Find, Perth | Northeastern terminus at T-intersection |
1.000 mi = 1.609 km; 1.000 km = 0.621 mi Note: Intersections with minor local roads are not shown

== Towns ==
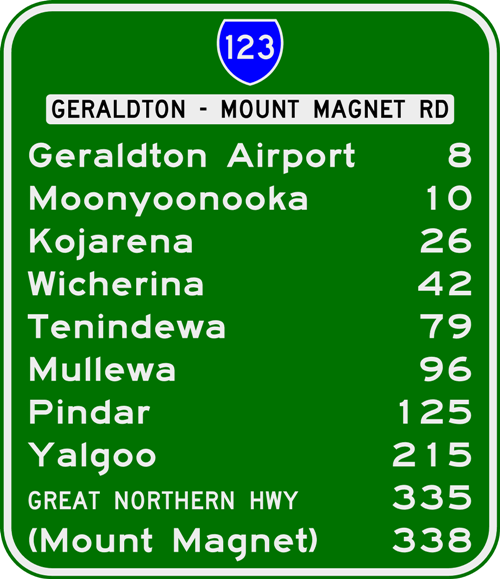

Towns and settlements on this highway include:

- Deepdale
- Geraldton Airport
- Moonyoonooka
- Kojarena
- Northern Gully
- Wicherina
- Tenindewa
- Mullewa
- Pindar
- Wurarga
- Yalgoo

== See also ==
- Highways in Australia
- List of highways in Western Australia
