= M3/A3 (Brisbane) =

Road in Queensland, Australia

Coordinates: 27°27′06.57″S 153°01′32.48″E

The (M3/A3) in Brisbane, Queensland, Australia, is a major urban road corridor. It connects Eight Mile Plains to Bald Hills via the following corridors:

- (M3) Pacific Motorway between Eight Mile Plains and Brisbane CBD
- Coronation Drive and (M3) Hale Street in the Brisbane CBD
- (M3) Inner City Bypass and Horace Street between Brisbane CBD and Bowen Hills
- (A3) Lutwyche Road between Bowen Hills and Kedron
- (A3) Gympie Road between Kedron and Carseldine
- (M3) Gympie Arterial Road between Carseldine and Bald Hills

== Major intersections ==
Each of the component roads (except Lutwyche Road, which does not have a Wikipedia article) has a road junction list.
