= Moresby, Western Australia =

Moresby
- Suburb
- Coordinates: 28°44′06″S 114°40′19″E
- Country: Australia
- State: Western Australia
- City: Geraldton
- LGA(s): City of Greater Geraldton
- Location: 10 km (6.2 mi) NE of Geraldton

Government
  - State electorate(s): Geraldton
  - Federal division(s): Durack

Area
  - Total: 26 km^{2} (10 sq mi)

Population
  - Total(s): 944 (SAL 2021)
- Postcode: 6530
Suburbs around Moresby
Waggrakine	Waggrakine
Spalding	Moresby	Moonyoonooka
Strathalbyn	Woorree	Deepdale

Moresby is a locality northeast of Geraldton, Western Australia, on the north bank of the Chapman River. Its local government area is the City of Greater Geraldton.

The locality was gazetted in 1980.

In the 2016 census, Moresby had a population of 870.

In 2019, Singapore-based developer Pip Holdings proposed to build a "rural Chinatown" in the suburb, with up to 1,500 houses, a commercial centre, and a school, all designed for Chinese immigrants. The project was suspended indefinitely in 2020 due to the COVID-19 pandemic.
