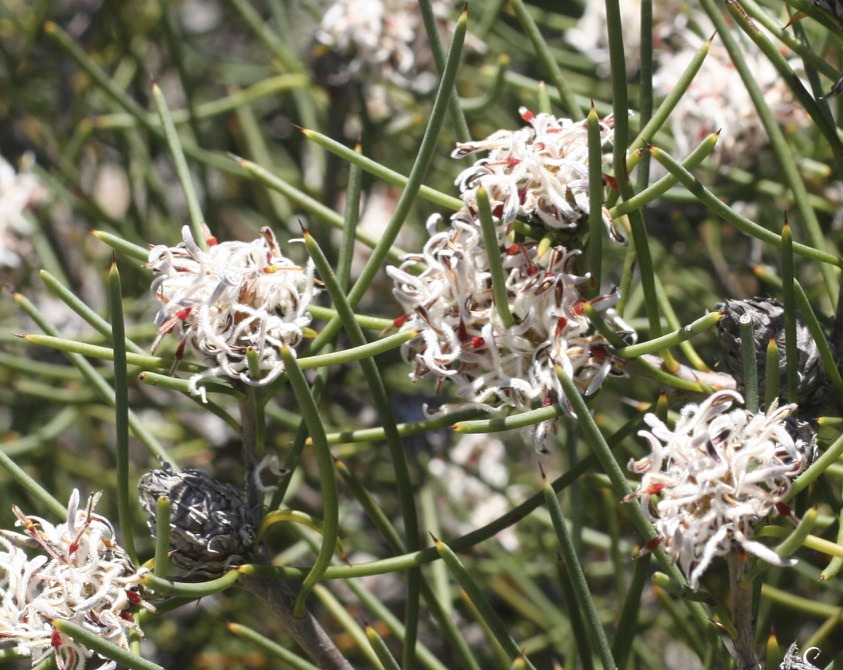
- Near Tenindewa

Scientific classification
- Kingdom: Plantae
- Clade: Tracheophytes
- Clade: Angiosperms
- Clade: Eudicots
- Order: Proteales
- Family: Proteaceae
- Genus: Petrophile
- Species: P. semifurcata

Binomial name
- Petrophile semifurcata F.Muell. ex Benth.

= Petrophile semifurcata =

Species of shrub endemic to Western Australia

Petrophile semifurcata is a species of flowering plant in the family Proteaceae and is endemic to an area near the west coast of Western Australia. It is an erect, bushy shrub with sharply-pointed, needle-shaped, sometimes lobed leaves and oval heads of silky-hairy, whitish, lemon-yellow or cream-coloured flowers.

== Description ==
Petrophile semifurcata is an erect, bushy shrub that typically grows to a height of 0.3–1.7 m (1 ft 0 in – 5 ft 7 in) and has softly-hairy branchlets. The leaves are glabrous, needle-shaped, sharply-pointed, 70–145 mm (2.8–5.7 in) long, sometimes with two or three lobes, the lobes sometimes divided again near the tip. The flowers are arranged on the ends of branchlets in oval heads 20–40 mm (0.79–1.57 in) long on a peduncle 8–16 mm (0.31–0.63 in) long, with deciduous bracts at the base. The flowers are about 14 mm (0.55 in) long, whitish, lemon-yellow or cream-coloured and silky-hairy. Flowering occurs from September to November and the fruit is a nut, fused with others in an oval head 25–38 mm (0.98–1.50 in) long on a peduncle 10–20 mm (0.39–0.79 in) long.

== Taxonomy ==
Petrophile semifurcata was first formally described in 1870 by George Bentham in Flora Australiensis from an unpublished description by Ferdinand von Mueller of material collected by Augustus Frederick Oldfield near the Murchison River. The specific epithet (semifurcata) means "half-forked", referring to the sometime simple, sometimes forked leaves.

== Distribution and habitat ==
This petrophile grows in heath on sandy-gravelly soils, sometimes with Banksia species and is found mainly between Geraldton and Kalbarri in the Avon Wheatbelt, Carnarvon, Geraldton Sandplains and Yalgoo biogeographic regions in the west of Western Australia.

== Conservation status ==
Petrophile semifurcata is classified as "not threatened" by the Government of Western Australia Department of Parks and Wildlife.
