= Deepdale, Western Australia =

Deepdale
- Suburb
- Coordinates: 28°46′34″S 114°40′52″E
- Country: Australia
- State: Western Australia
- City: Geraldton
- LGA(s): City of Greater Geraldton
- Location: 8 km (5.0 mi) E of Geraldton

Government
  - State electorate(s): Geraldton
  - Federal division(s): Durack

Area
  - Total: 6.4 km^{2} (2.5 sq mi)

Population
  - Total(s): 973 (SAL 2021)
- Postcode: 6532
Suburbs around Deepdale
	Moresby
Woorree	Deepdale	Moonyoonooka
Utakarra	Meru

Deepdale is a locality east of Geraldton, Western Australia. Its local government area is the City of Greater Geraldton.

The locality was gazetted in 1985.

== Geography ==
Deepdale is located 8 kilometres (5 mi) east of Geraldton's central business district along the south bank of the Chapman River, and is accessed via Geraldton-Mount Magnet Road. The locality is bounded on the west by Polo Road and on the east by Deepdale Road.
