= Strathalbyn =

Strathalbyn is the name of two places in Australia.

- Strathalbyn, South Australia
- Strathalbyn, Western Australia, a suburb of Geraldton
