= Gympie (disambiguation) =

Gympie may refer to:

- Gympie, a city in Queensland, Australia
  - Gympie Airport
  - Electoral district of Gympie
  - Gympie Region, its local government authority
  - Gympie Road, Brisbane, a road in Brisbane
  - Gympie Arterial Road, a highway in Brisbane
- Gympie Gympie (Dendrocnide moroides), a stinging plant
