= Beresford, Western Australia =

Beresford
- Suburb
- Coordinates: 28°45′25″S 114°37′12″E
- Country: Australia
- State: Western Australia
- City: Geraldton
- LGA(s): City of Greater Geraldton
- Location: 2 km (1.2 mi) N of Geraldton

Government
  - State electorate(s): Geraldton
  - Federal division(s): Durack

Area
  - Total: 1.4 km^{2} (0.54 sq mi)

Population
  - Total(s): 1,463 (SAL 2021)
- Postcode: 6530
Suburbs around Beresford
| | Bluff Point | Spalding |
| Indian Ocean | Beresford | Webberton |
| | Geraldton | Wonthella |

Beresford is a northern coastal suburb of Geraldton, Western Australia. Its local government area is the City of Greater Geraldton.

The suburb was gazetted in 1972.

== Geography ==
Beresford is located between Geraldton's central business district and Bluff Point, and is bounded by Phelps Street to the south, Reilly and Wittenoom Streets to the southeast, North West Coastal Highway to the east, the Indian Ocean to the west and Davis Street to the north.

== Demographics ==
In the 2006 census, Beresford had a population of 1,234.

Beresford residents had a median age of 38, and median incomes were slightly above average for the Geraldton region — $491 per week compared to $461 per week. The population of Beresford was predominantly Australian-born - 79.6% as at the 2001 census - while 4.30% were born in the United Kingdom. 5.97% reported one or more parents of Italian birth.

The most popular religious affiliations in descending order in the 2001 census were Roman Catholic, no religion, Anglican and Uniting.

== Facilities ==
Beresford's southern section contains the Geraldton Entertainment Centre and a private school, Geraldton Grammar School.
