= Meru, Western Australia =

Meru
- Suburb
- Coordinates: 28°48′11″S 114°41′10″E
- Country: Australia
- State: Western Australia
- City: Geraldton
- LGA(s): City of Greater Geraldton
- Location: 10 km (6.2 mi) SE of Geraldton

Government
  - State electorate(s): Geraldton
  - Federal division(s): Durack

Area
  - Total: 4.4 km^{2} (1.7 sq mi)

Population
  - Total(s): 219 (SAL 2021)
- Postcode: 6530
Suburbs around Meru
	Deepdale
Narngulu	Meru	Moonyoonooka
	Narngulu

Meru is a locality southeast of Geraldton, Western Australia. Its local government area is the City of Greater Geraldton.

The locality was gazetted in 1985.
