= Webberton, Western Australia =

Webberton
- Suburb
- Coordinates: 28°45′07″S 114°37′52″E
- Country: Australia
- State: Western Australia
- City: Geraldton
- LGA(s): City of Greater Geraldton
- Location: 4 km (2.5 mi) NE of Geraldton

Government
  - State electorate(s): Geraldton
  - Federal division(s): Durack

Area
  - Total: 2.5 km^{2} (0.97 sq mi)

Population
  - Total(s): 158 (SAL 2021)
- Postcode: 6530
Suburbs around Webberton
Bluff Point	Spalding	Spalding
Beresford	Webberton	Strathalbyn
Beresford	Wonthella	Wonthella

Webberton is an industrial suburb northeast of Geraldton, Western Australia. Its local government area is the City of Greater Geraldton.

The suburb was gazetted in 1972.

== Geography ==
Webberton is located 4 kilometres (2.5 mi) northeast of Geraldton's central business district, inland from Beresford. It is bounded by North West Coastal Highway to the west, Place Road to the south, Fallowfield Street to the east and Bedford and Koojarra Streets to the north.
