= Woorree, Western Australia =

Woorree
- Suburb
- Coordinates: 28°46′30″S 114°39′40″E
- Country: Australia
- State: Western Australia
- City: Geraldton
- LGA(s): City of Greater Geraldton
- Location: 7 km (4.3 mi) ENE of Geraldton

Government
  - State electorate(s): Geraldton
  - Federal division(s): Durack

Area
  - Total: 5 km^{2} (1.9 sq mi)

Population
  - Total(s): 1,295 (SAL 2021)
- Postcode: 6530
Suburbs around Woorree
Strathalbyn	Moresby	Moresby
Wonthella	Woorree	Deepdale
Utakarra	Utakarra	Deepdale

Woorree is an eastern suburb of Geraldton, Western Australia. Its local government area is the City of Greater Geraldton.

The suburb was gazetted in 1981.

== Geography ==
Woorree is located 7 kilometres (4 mi) east-northeast of Geraldton's central business district along the south bank of the Chapman River. It is bounded by Place Road to the north, Polo Road to the east and Geraldton-Mount Magnet Road to the south.

== Demographics ==
In the 2006 census, Woorree had a population of 1,058, up from 612 (42.15%) at the 2001 census.
