= Freeways in Australia =

== Australian Capital Territory ==
=== Canberra region ===
- Federal Highway - Between state border with New South Wales, and Antill Street roundabout. M23 designation diverts at the Majura Parkway interchange, while Federal Highway continues as A23.
- Majura Parkway
- Monaro Highway - Between Majura Parkway and Lanyon Drive. Upgrades of the road are currently underway to extend the Freeway section of the Highway to Johnson Drive in the South of Canberra.

Other freeways (no route number)

- Adelaide Avenue
- Yarra Glen
- Capital Circle
- Gungahlin Drive Extension
- Parkes Way
- Tuggeranong Parkway

=== Gallery ===
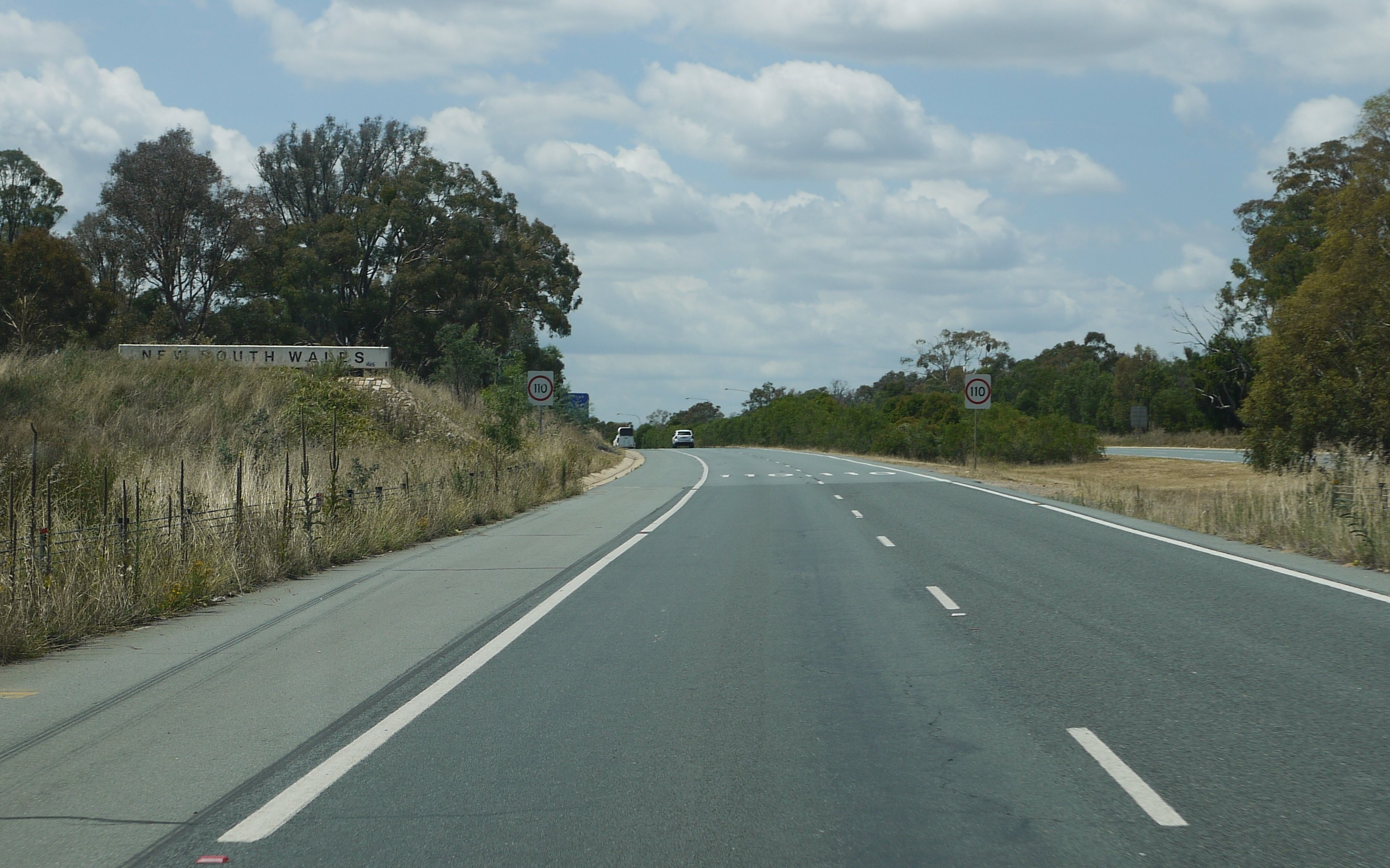
M23 Federal Highway

== New South Wales ==
New South Wales has the largest number and second highest density of motorways in Australia (behind Victoria), with the majority being located in Sydney City or the metropolitan areas.

=== Sydney region (urban motorways) ===
- Speed limit varies between 60 km/h and 110 km/h.

- Gore Hill Freeway
- Warringah Freeway
- Sydney Harbour Tunnel (tolled for southbound traffic)
- Cahill Expressway
- Eastern Distributor (tolled for northbound traffic)
- Southern Cross Drive
- General Holmes Drive, the Airport Tunnel

- Lane Cove Tunnel (tolled)
- M2 Hills Motorway

- M4 Motorway (tolled east of Church Street, Parramatta)
- Rozelle Interchange
- Anzac Bridge
- Western Distributor
- Bradfield Highway (toll)

- M5 Motorway (tolled)

- Westlink M7 Motorway (tolled)

- M8 Motorway (tolled)

- NorthConnex (tolled)

- M12 Motorway

- Gladesville Bridge, Hunters Hill – This bridge was built as part of the North Western Expressway, a road which was ultimately never built.

- M31 Hume Motorway

Unnumbered freeway-grade roads

- Cross City Tunnel (tolled)
- Burns Bay Road (South of Lane Cove West) – This route was built as part of the F3 but was cancelled.
- Captain Cook Bridge – The only bit of F6 inside Sydney as a proposed extension but cancelled
- Syd Einfeld Drive (The only part of F7)

=== Hunter and Central Coast region (rural and urban motorways) ===
- Speed limit varies between 60 km/h and 110 km/h.

- M1 Pacific Motorway (Sydney to Newcastle) (Formerly known as the F3 & 1)

- Hunter Expressway

- A37 Newcastle Inner City Bypass

=== South Coast region (rural and urban motorways) ===
- M1 Princes Motorway

- Memorial Drive (Wollongong) – Most of this road is freeway grade – (The south 4 km of the road and the north 3 km of the road are, the central bit is not though)

- Princes Highway, 16% of which is of motorway or dual carriageway standard.

=== Rural region (rural motorways) ===
- Speed limit varies between 90 km/h and 110 km/h.

- Pacific Motorway (Northern NSW, from Ballina to QLD border)
- Pacific Highway, 100% of which is of motorway or dual carriageway standard, except for through Coffs Harbour – but still two lanes as arterial standards in each direction.

- Federal Highway

- Barton Highway – 21% of which is of motorway or dual carriageway standard, with the remainder under construction and proposed for completion by the end of 2023. See freeway route here

- Hume Motorway
- Hume Highway, 100% of which is dual carriageway standard.

- Great Western Highway – Lithgow to Mount Lambie

=== Under construction ===
- Western Harbour Tunnel (Major multibillion-dollar tollway/tunnels, connecting WestConnex with the Warringah Freeway)

- Barton Highway duplication project (To be completed by mid 2023)

- Newcastle Inner City Bypass Stage 5

=== In planning ===
- Southconnex – M6 Motorway (Sydney) (F6 extension)

- Outer Sydney Orbital – Estimated to be completed in 2040.

=== Gallery ===
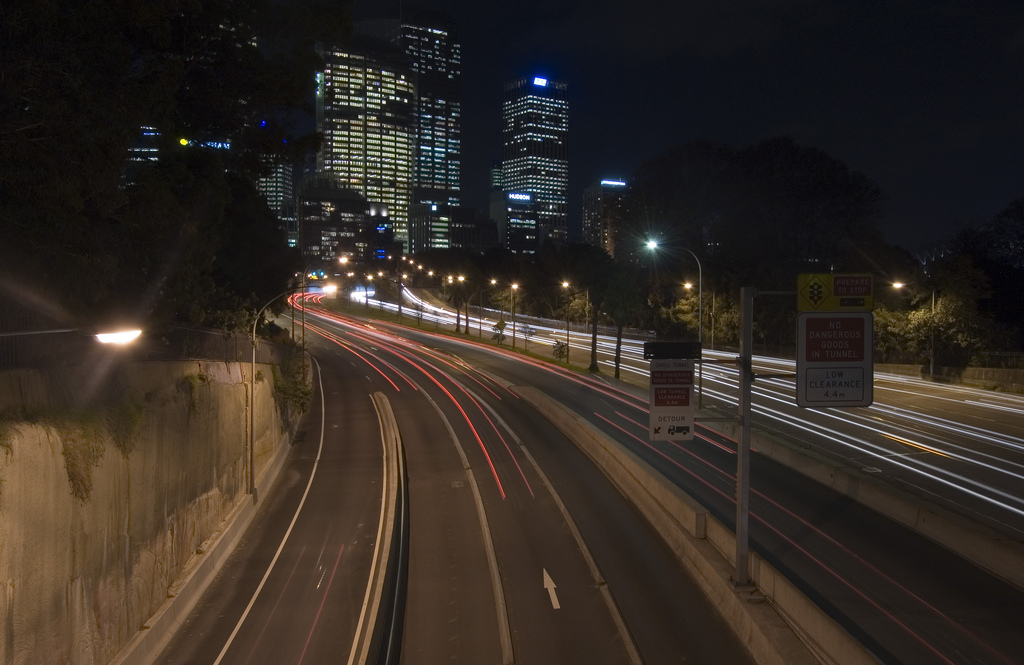
M1 Cahill Expressway

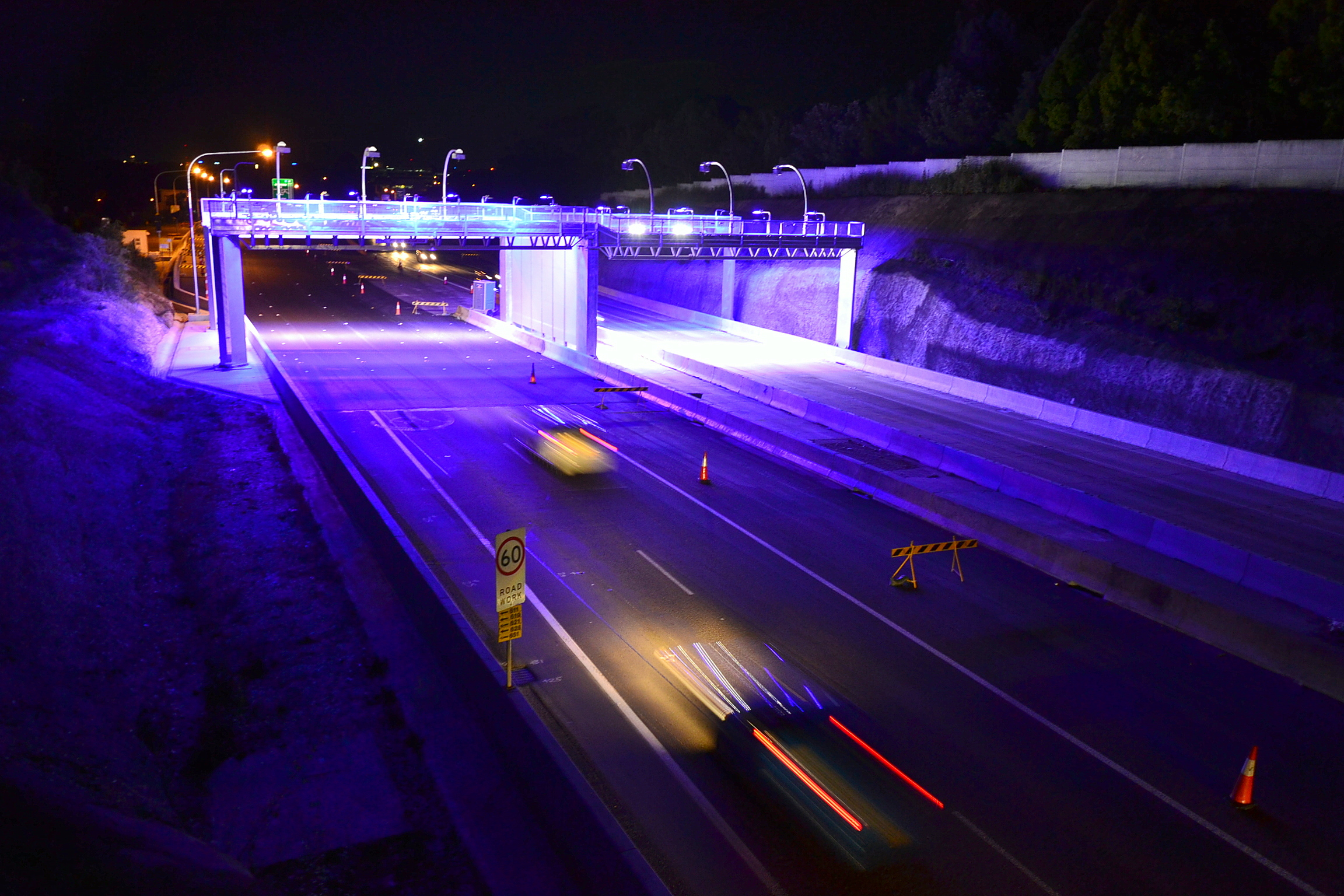
M2 Hills Motorway

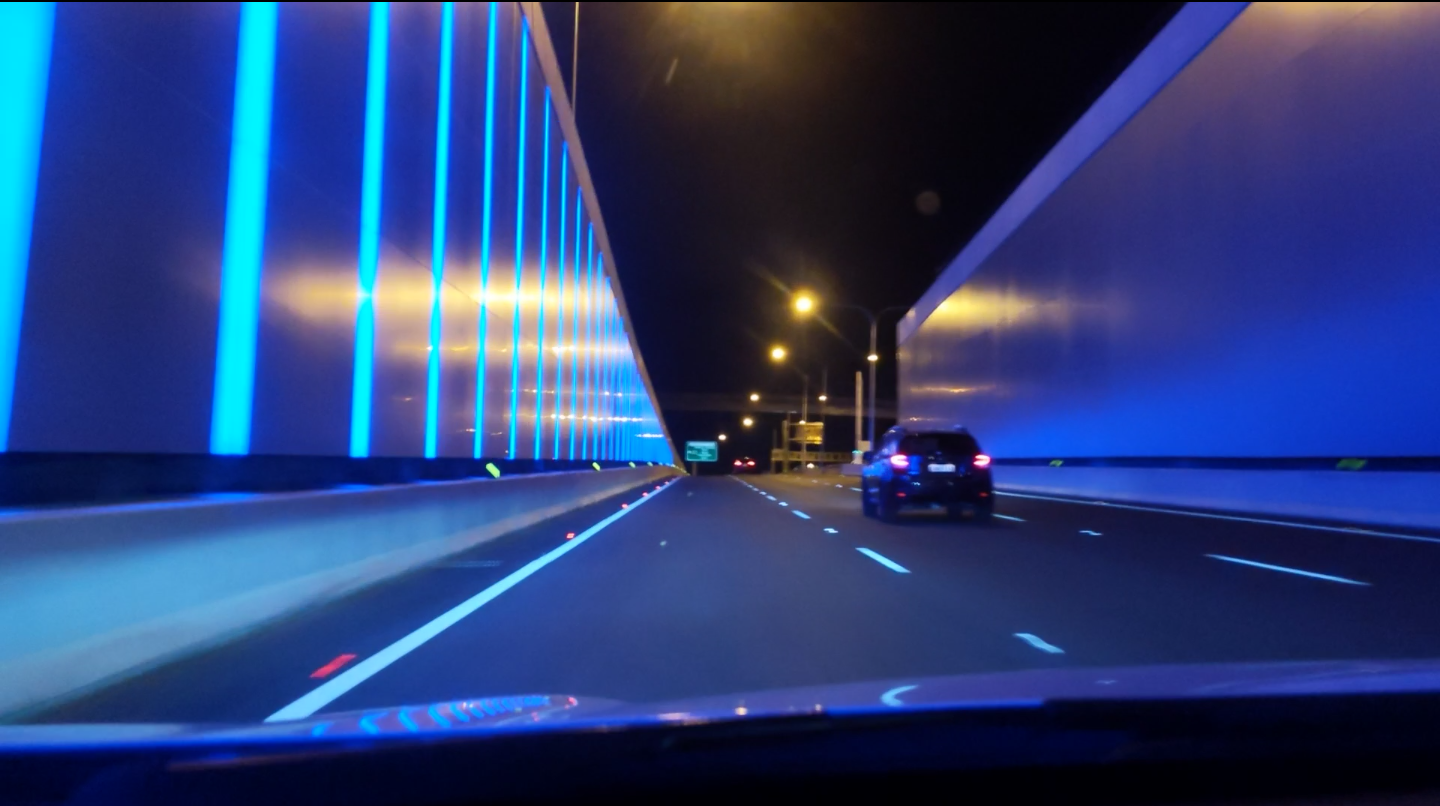
M4 Western Motorway

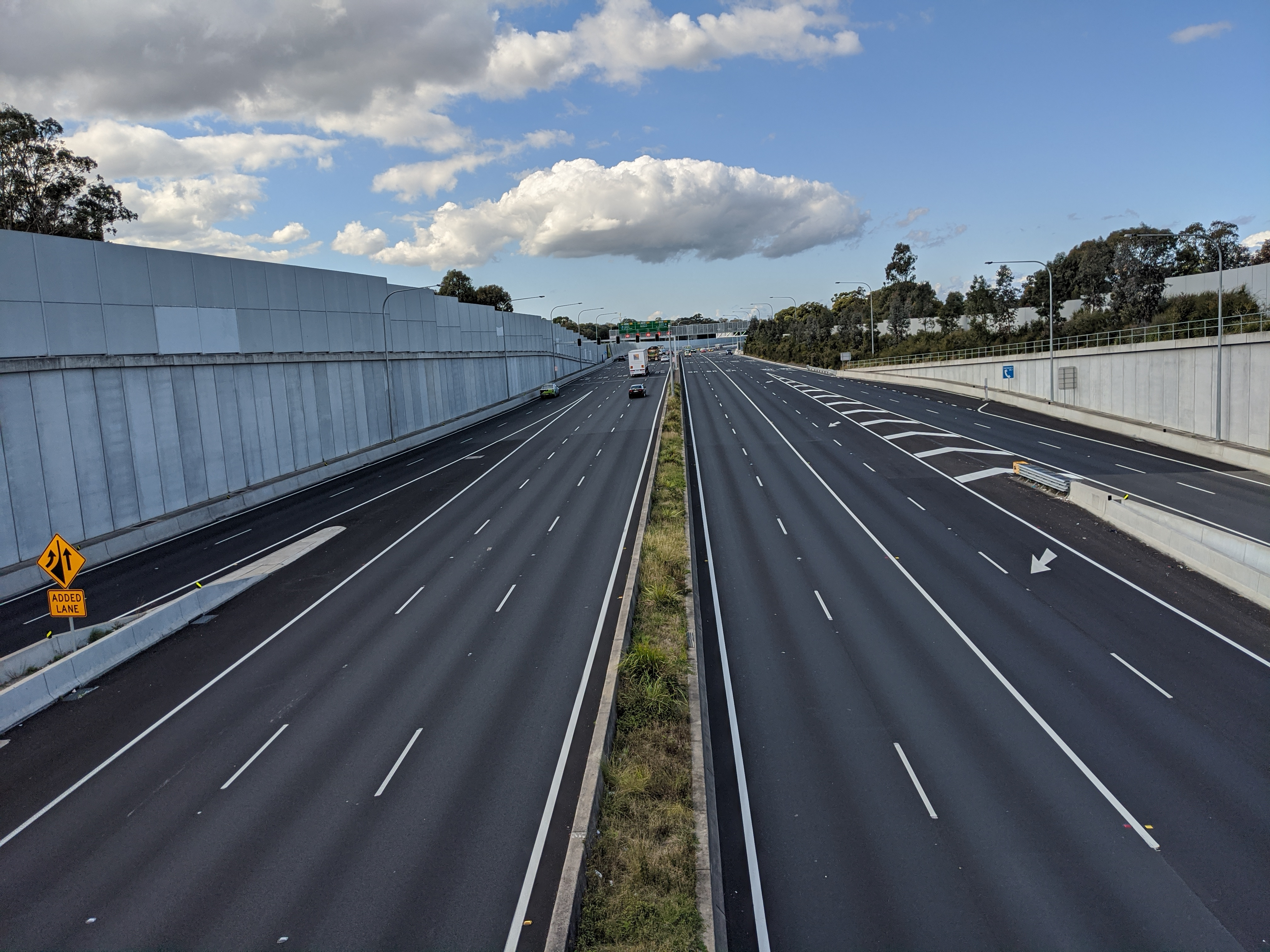
M5 East Motorway

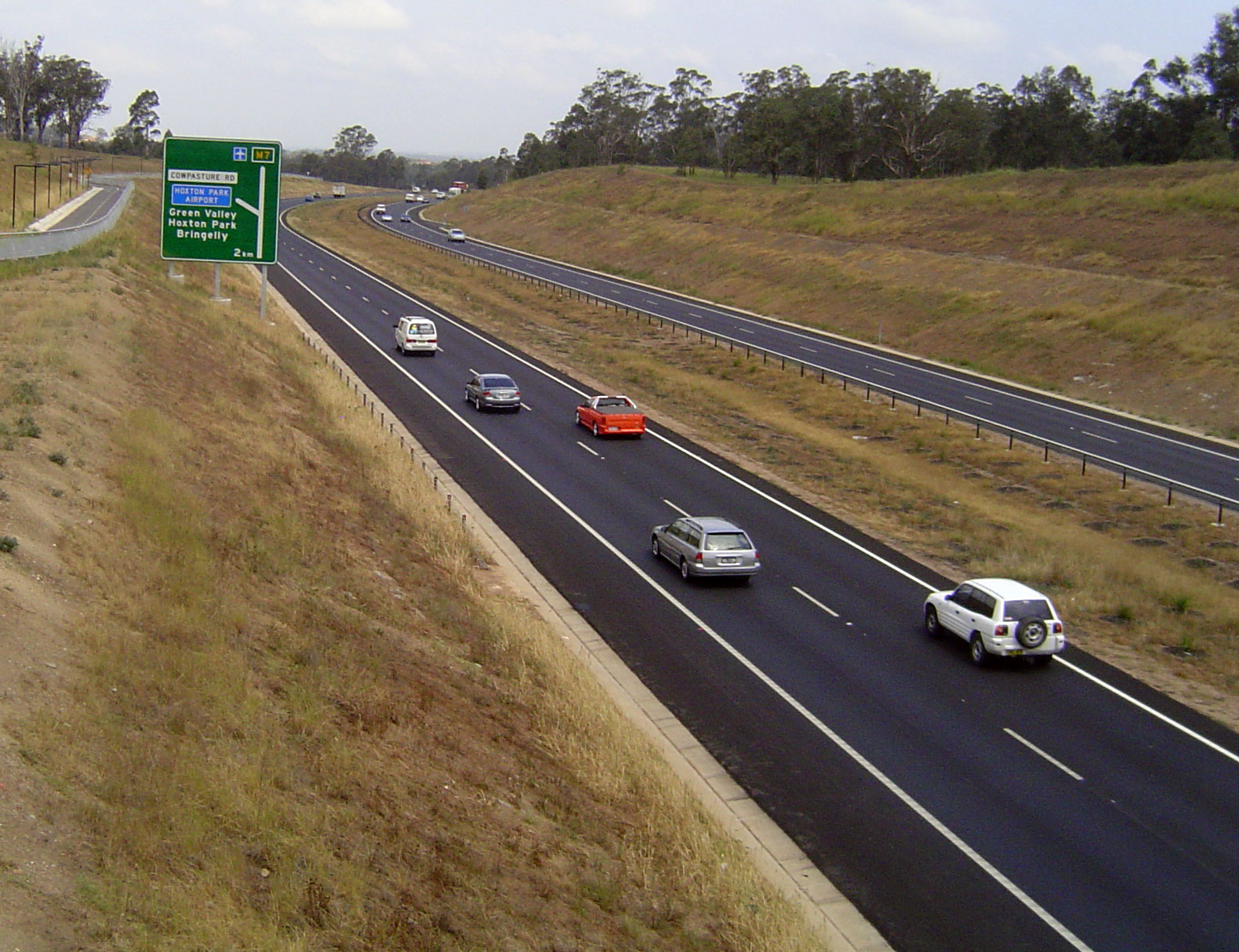
M7 WestLink

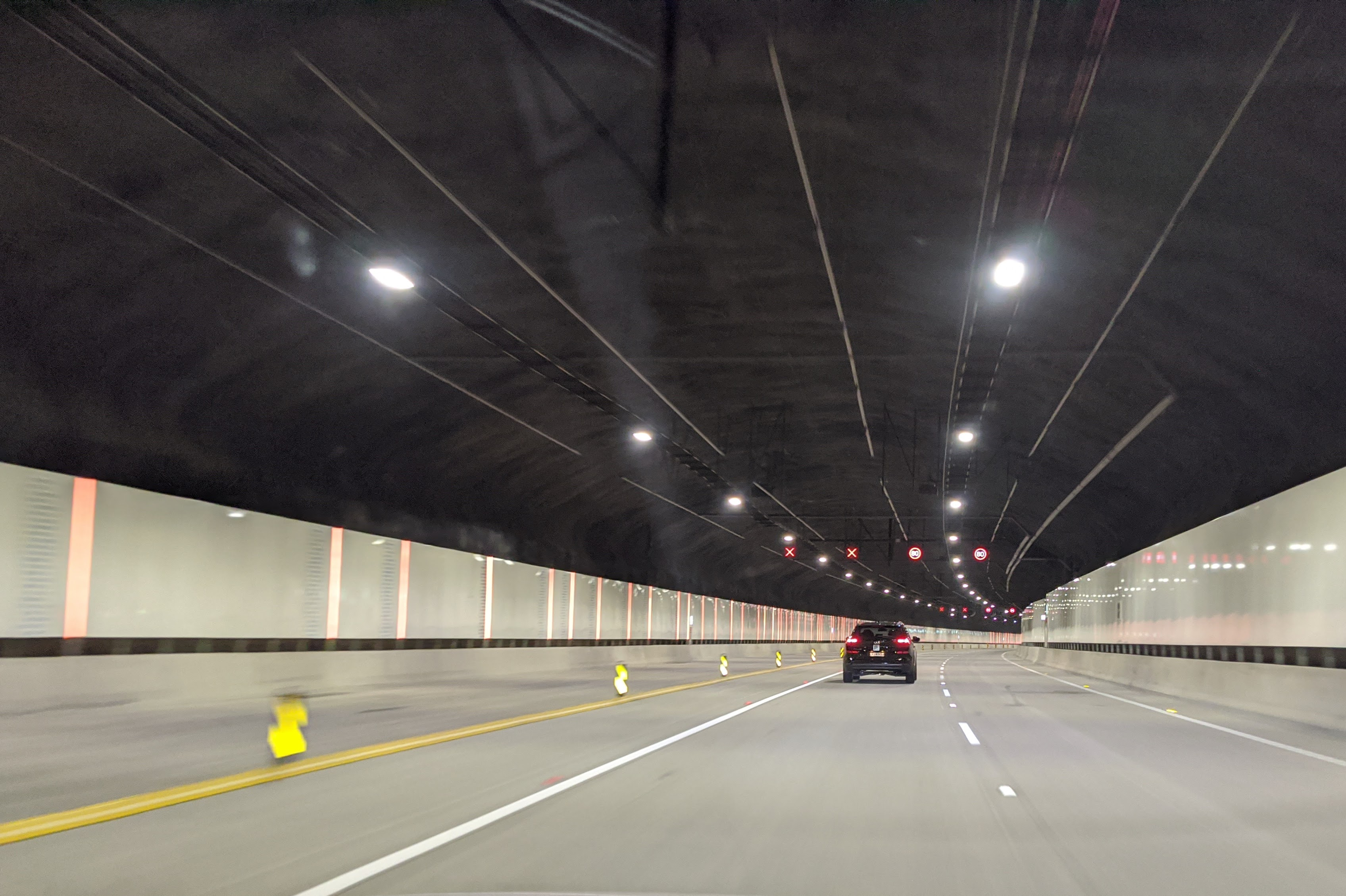
M8 WestConnex

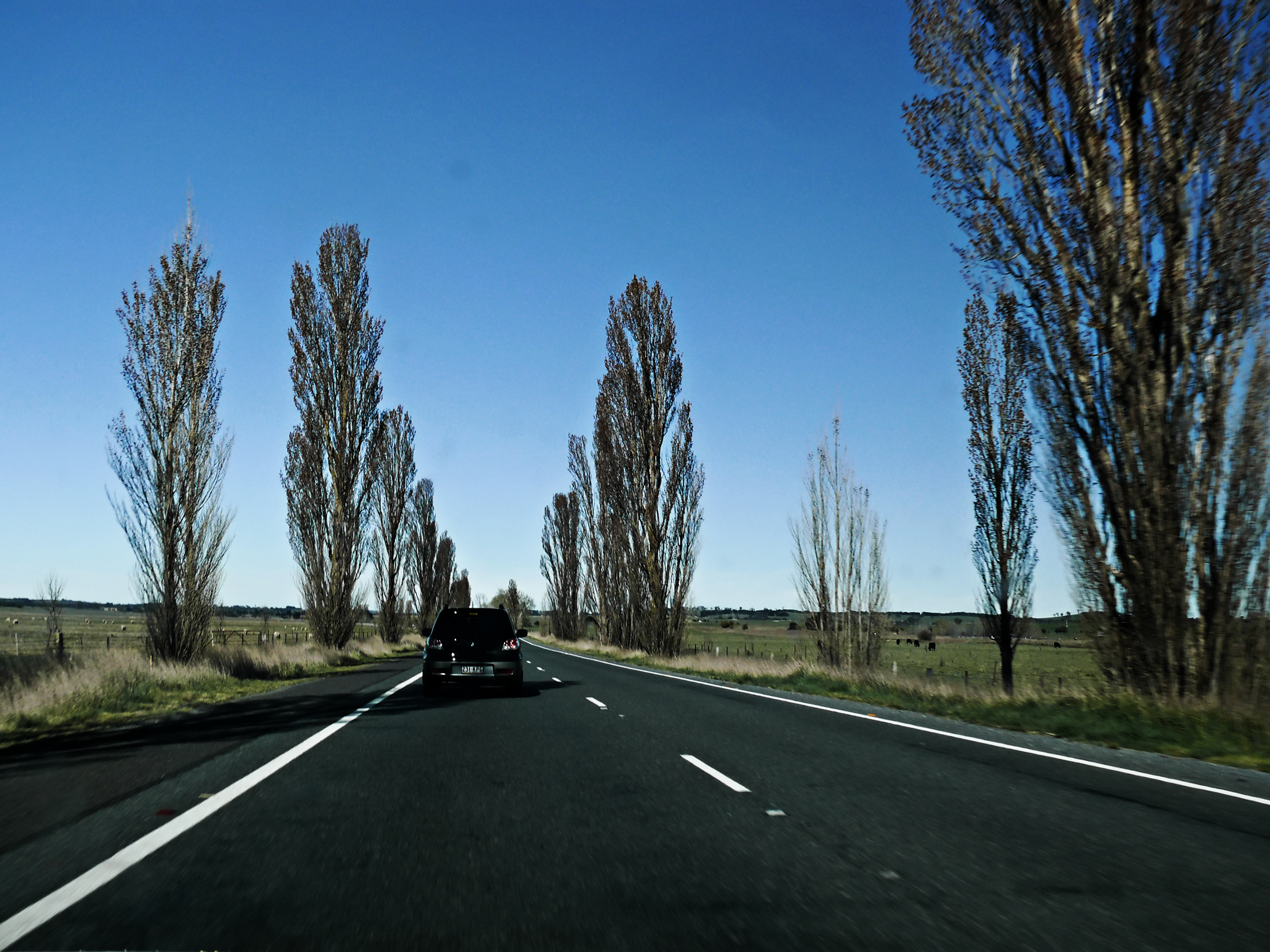
M23 Federal Highway

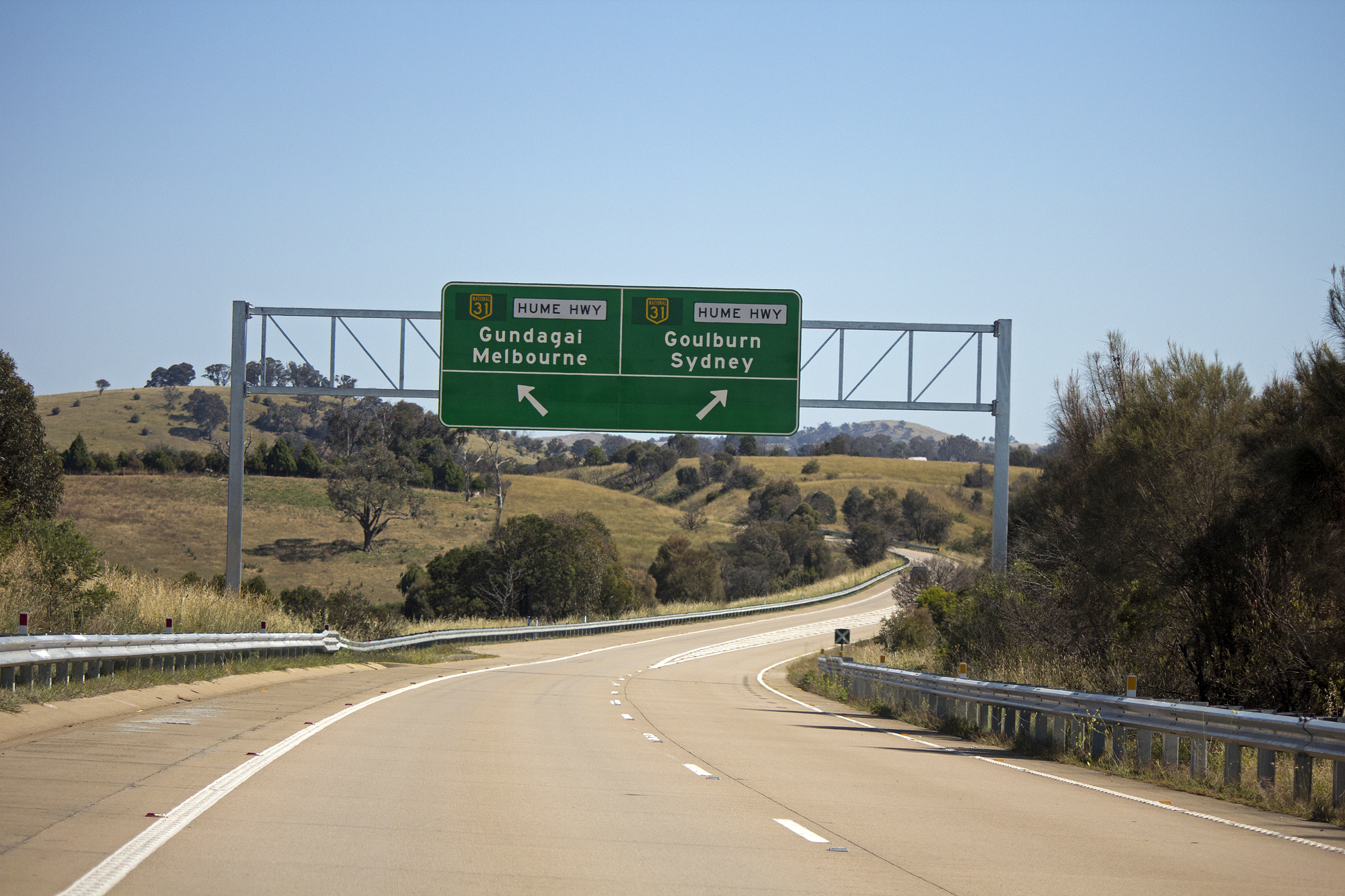
M25 Barton Highway

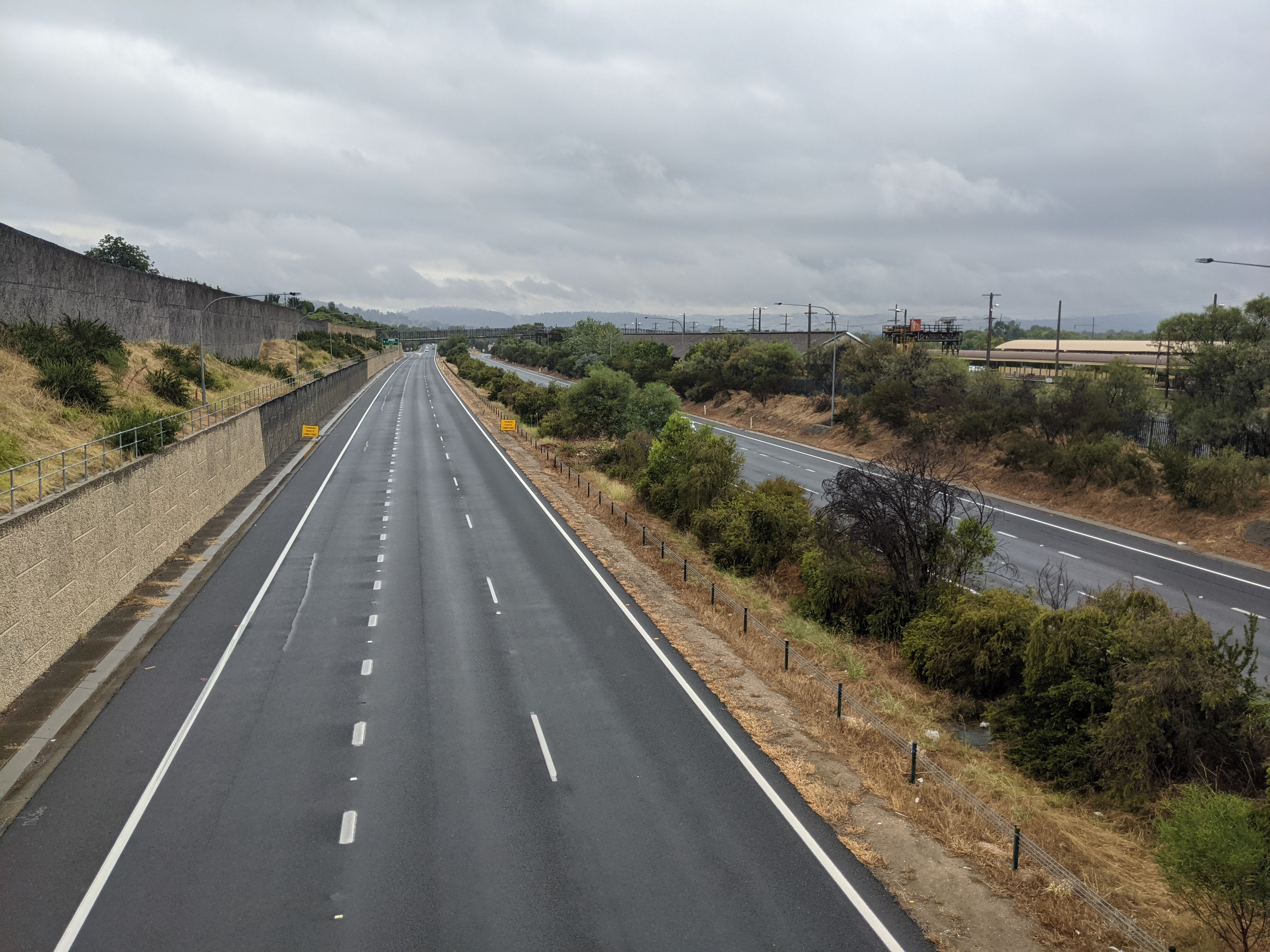
M31 Hume Highway

== Northern Territory ==
While the Northern Territory does not have any official freeways, parts of the Stuart Highway and the Tiger Brennan Drive are freeway grade roads with grade separate intersections.

See full freeway route here

- Tiger Brennan Drive
- Weddell Freeway - in planning

== Queensland ==
=== Brisbane region ===
- Bruce Highway (Bald Hills to Curra)
- Gateway Motorway (Eight Mile Plains to Bald Hills)
- Pacific Motorway (NSW/QLD Border to Eight Mile Plains)

- Ipswich Motorway (Goodna to Dinmore)
- Warrego Highway (Dinmore to Muirlea)
- Logan Motorway (M2 Gailes to Drewvale, Electronically Tolled)
- Gateway Motorway (M2 Drewvale to Eight Mile Plains, Electronically Tolled)

- Inner City Bypass (Hale Street to Lutwyche Road)
- Pacific Motorway
- Riverside Expressway
- Gympie Arterial Road
- Hale Street

- Port of Brisbane Motorway

- Legacy Way (M5)
- Western Freeway
- Centenary Motorway

- Logan Motorway (Drewvale to Loganholme, Electronically Tolled)

- Ipswich Motorway (Goodna to Rocklea)
- Airport Link Tunnel (M7 Electronically Tolled)
- Clem Jones Tunnel (Clem7) (M7 Electronically Tolled)

- Cunningham Highway (Riverview to Yamanto)

'No shield'

- Southern Cross Way
- Inner City Bypass (Lutwyche Road to Kingsford Drive)

Motorway grade roads

- Moreton Bay Road (Freeway grade from Chandler to Capalaba)

- Mount Lindesay Highway (Freeway grade from Drewvale to North MacLean – see full route here )

Former motorways

- Story Bridge Expressway

=== Gold Coast region ===
- Pacific Motorway

- Coomera Connector (Stage 1 opening late-2025)

- Smith Street Motorway

=== Sunshine Coast region ===
- Bruce Highway

- Sunshine Motorway

=== Regional Queensland ===
- Bruce Highway (Bald Hills to Kybong, Townsville Ring Road)

- Toowoomba Bypass
  - Warrego Highway (Helidon Spa to Charlton; A2/ Helidon Spa to Mort Street Electronically tolled)
  - Gore Highway (Charlton to Athol)

=== Gallery ===
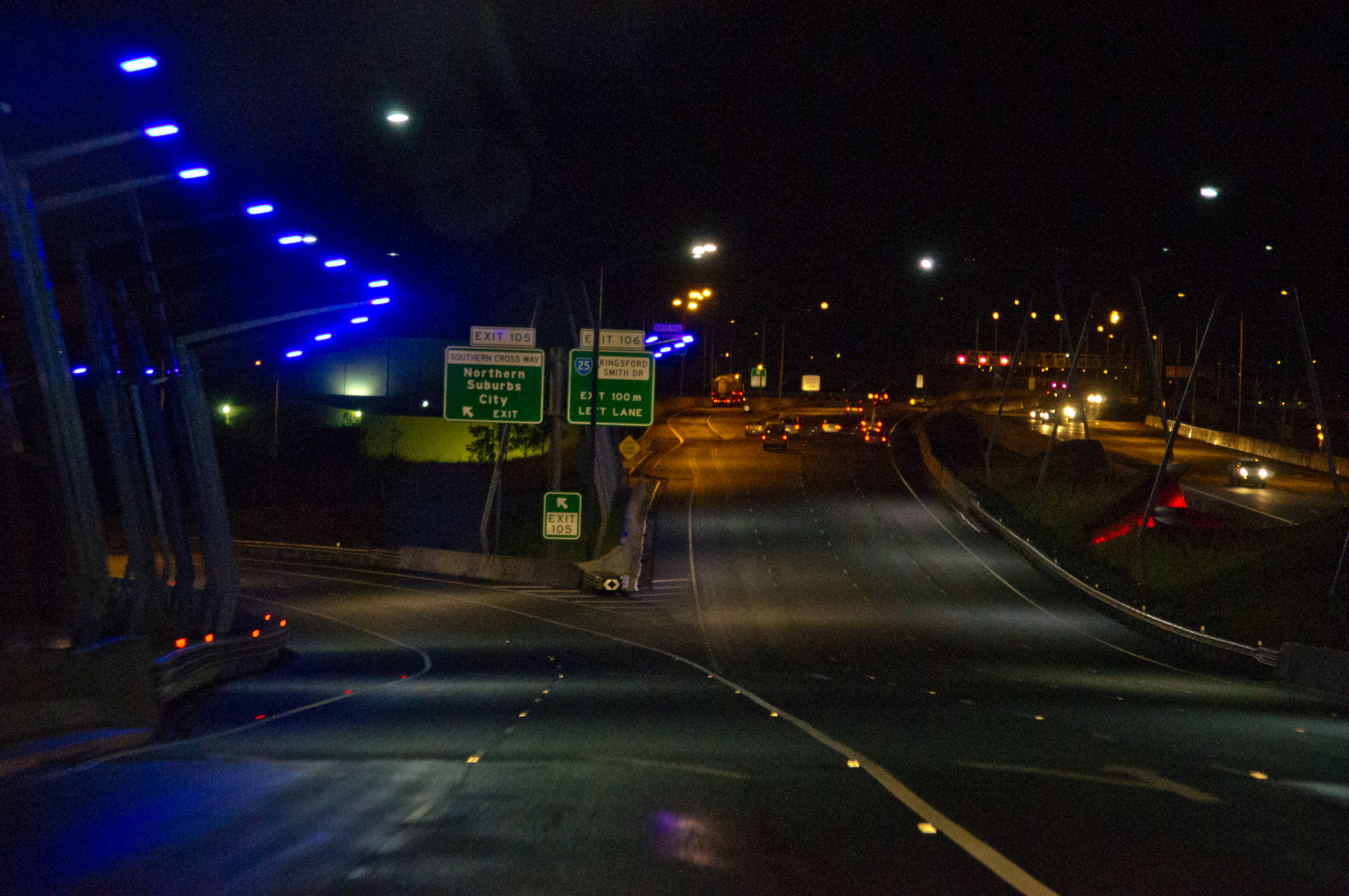
M1 Gateway Motorway

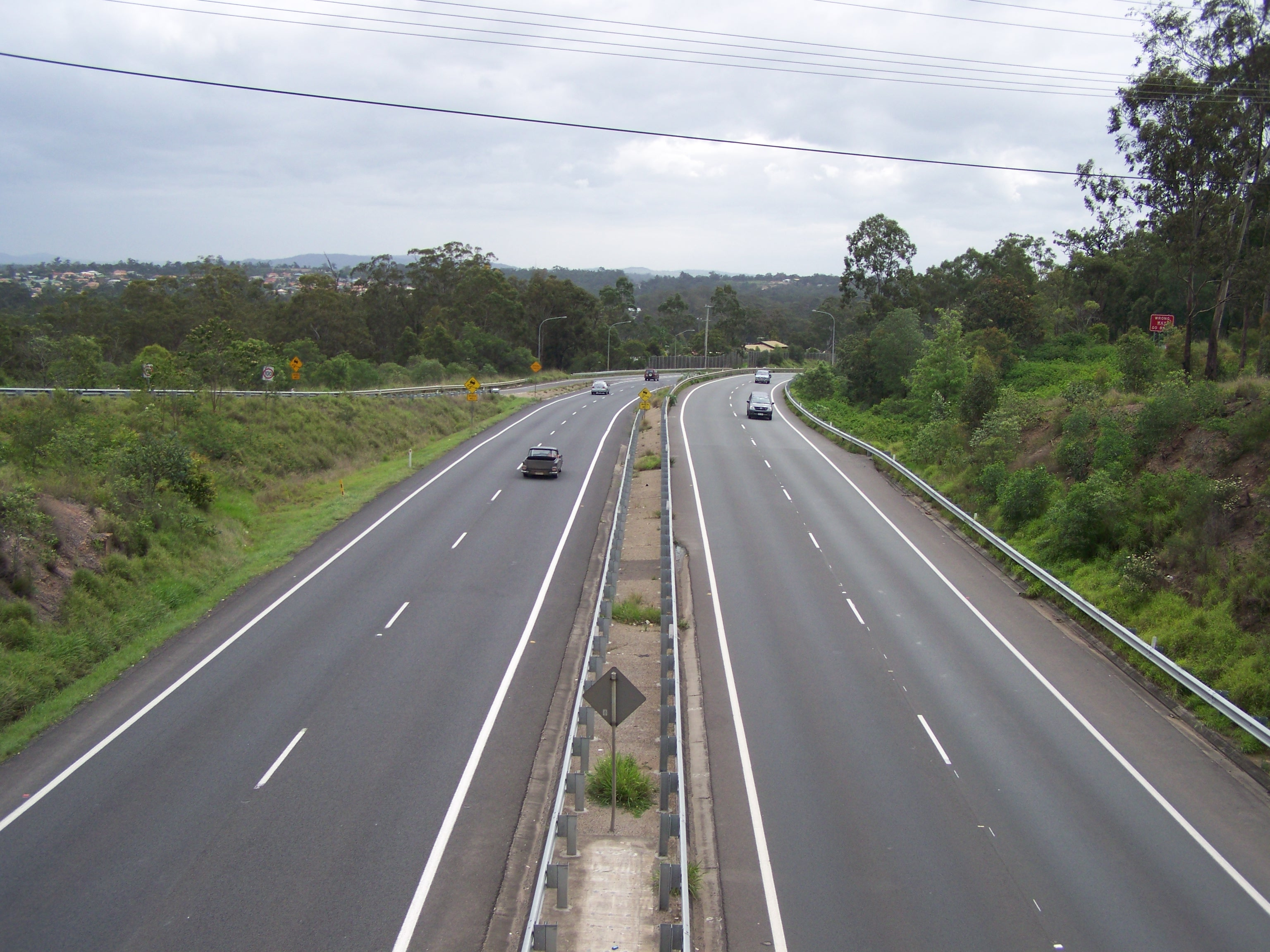
M2 Warrego Highway

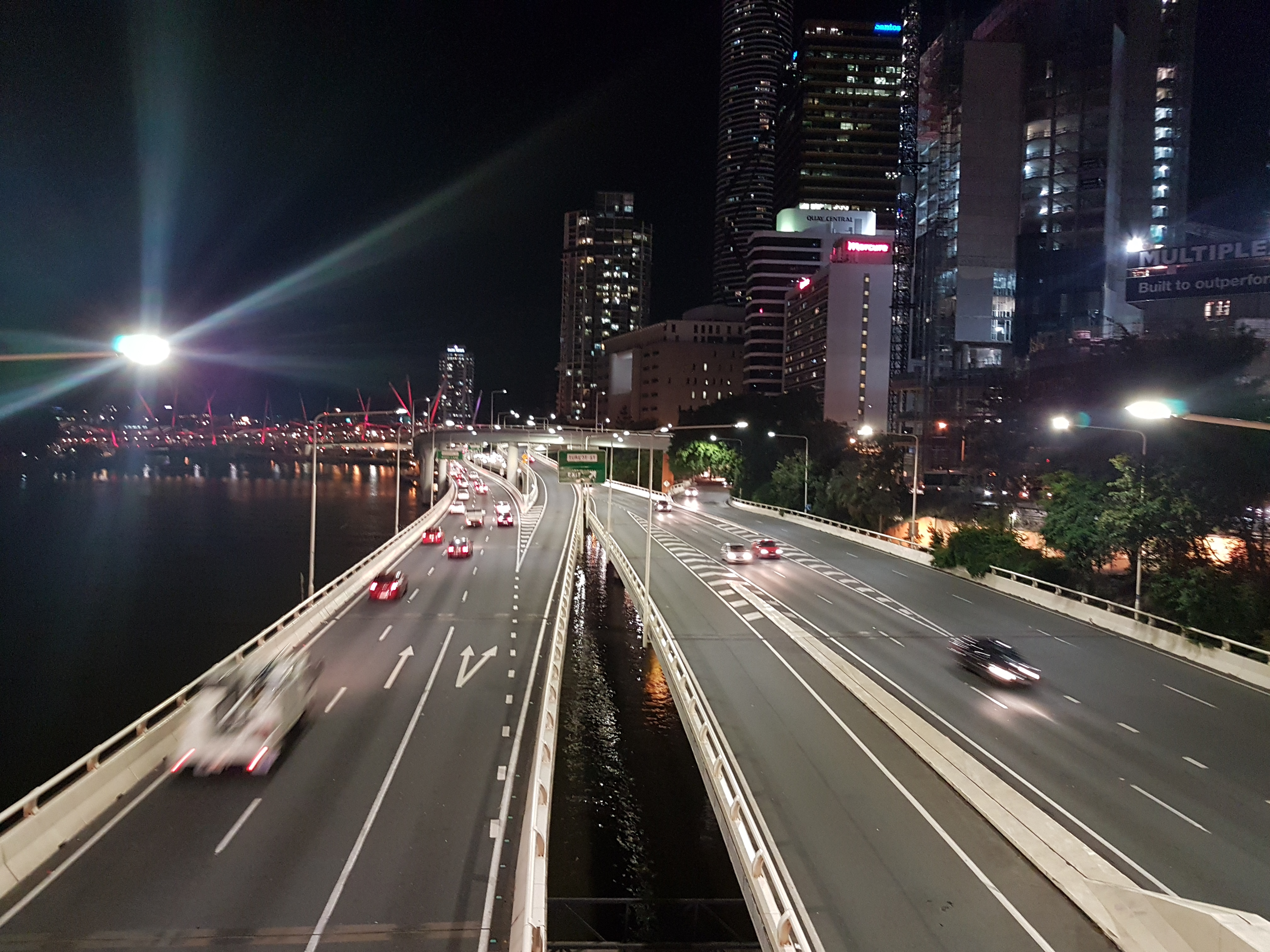
M3 Pacific Motorway

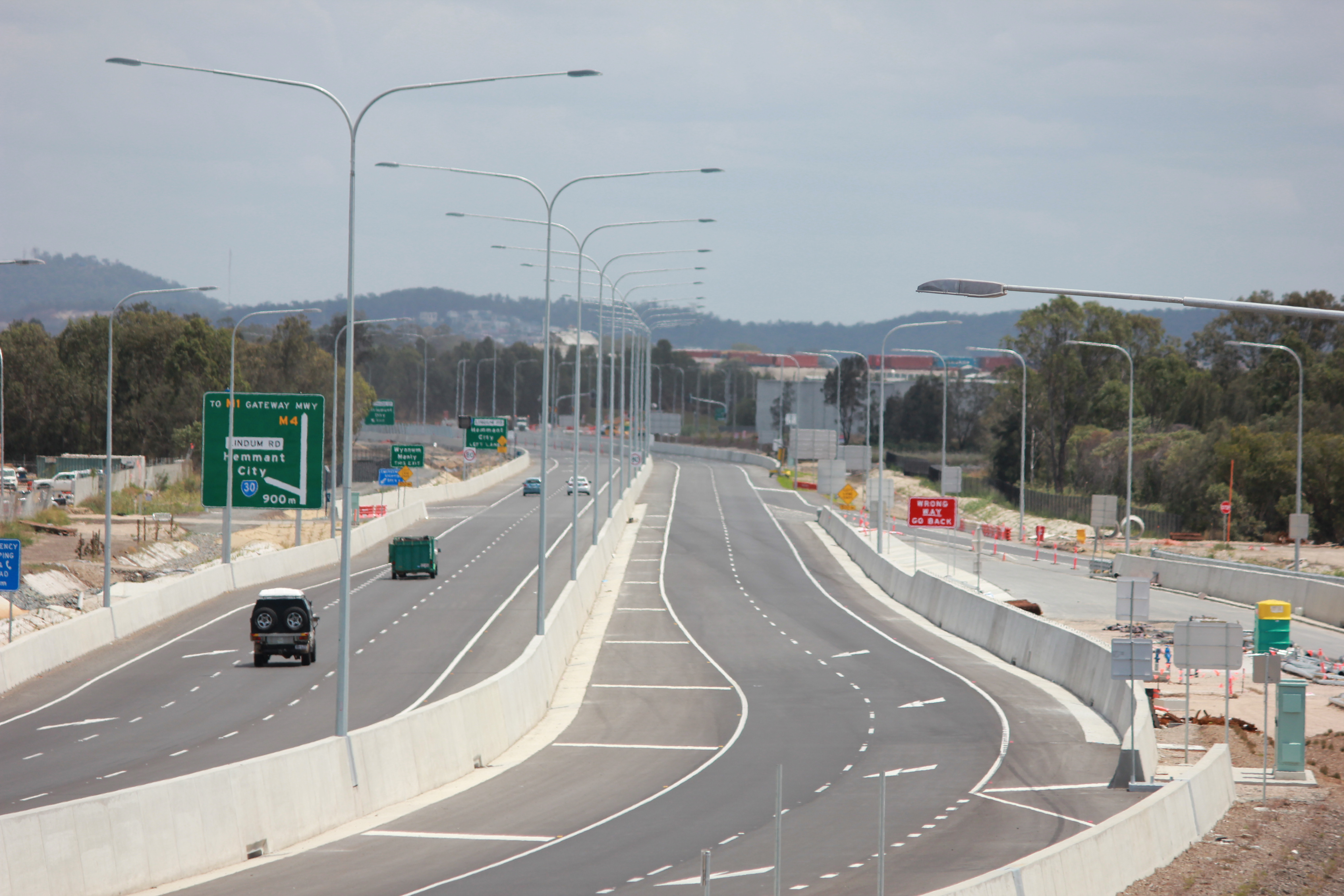
M4 Port of Brisbane Motorway

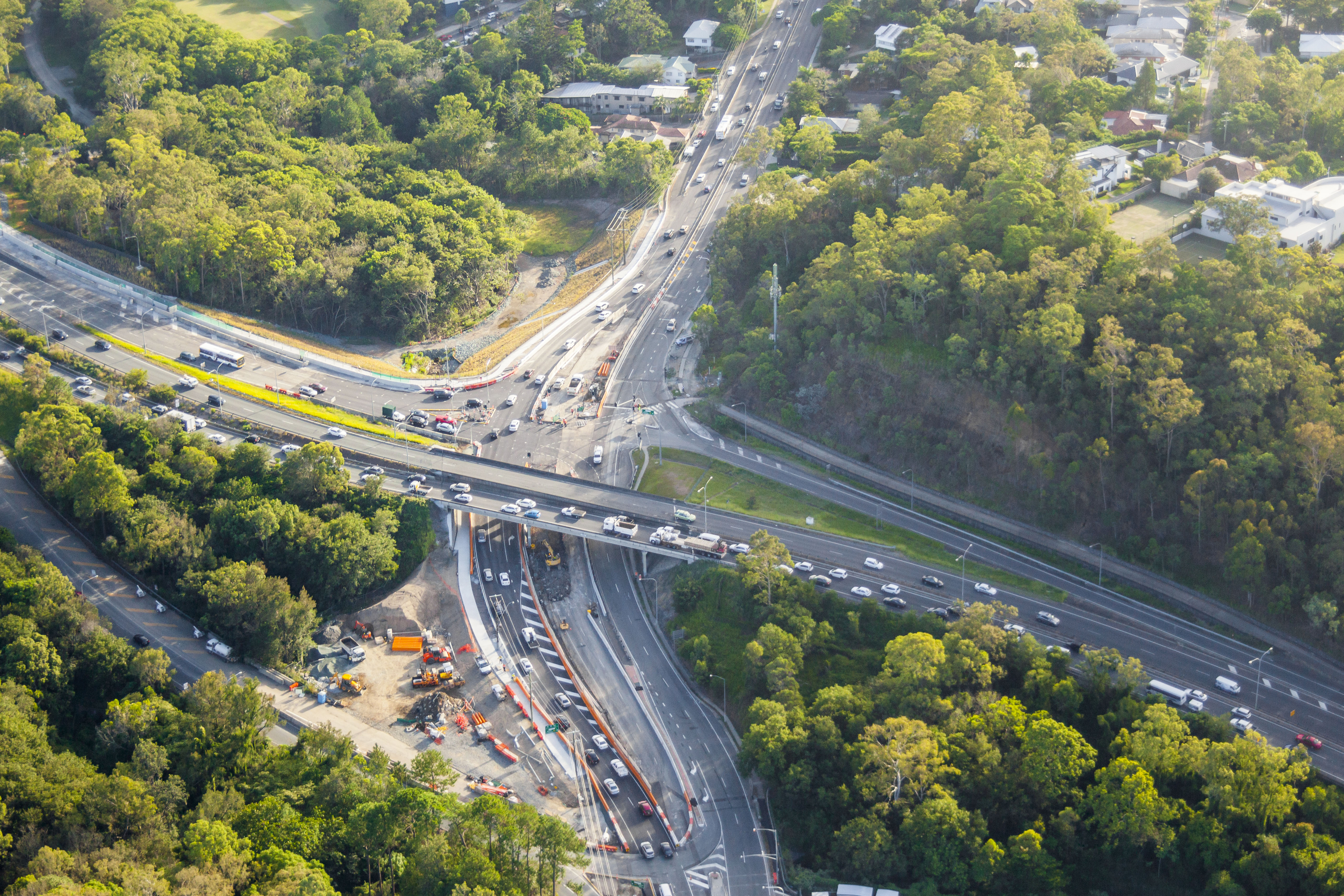
M5 Western Freeway

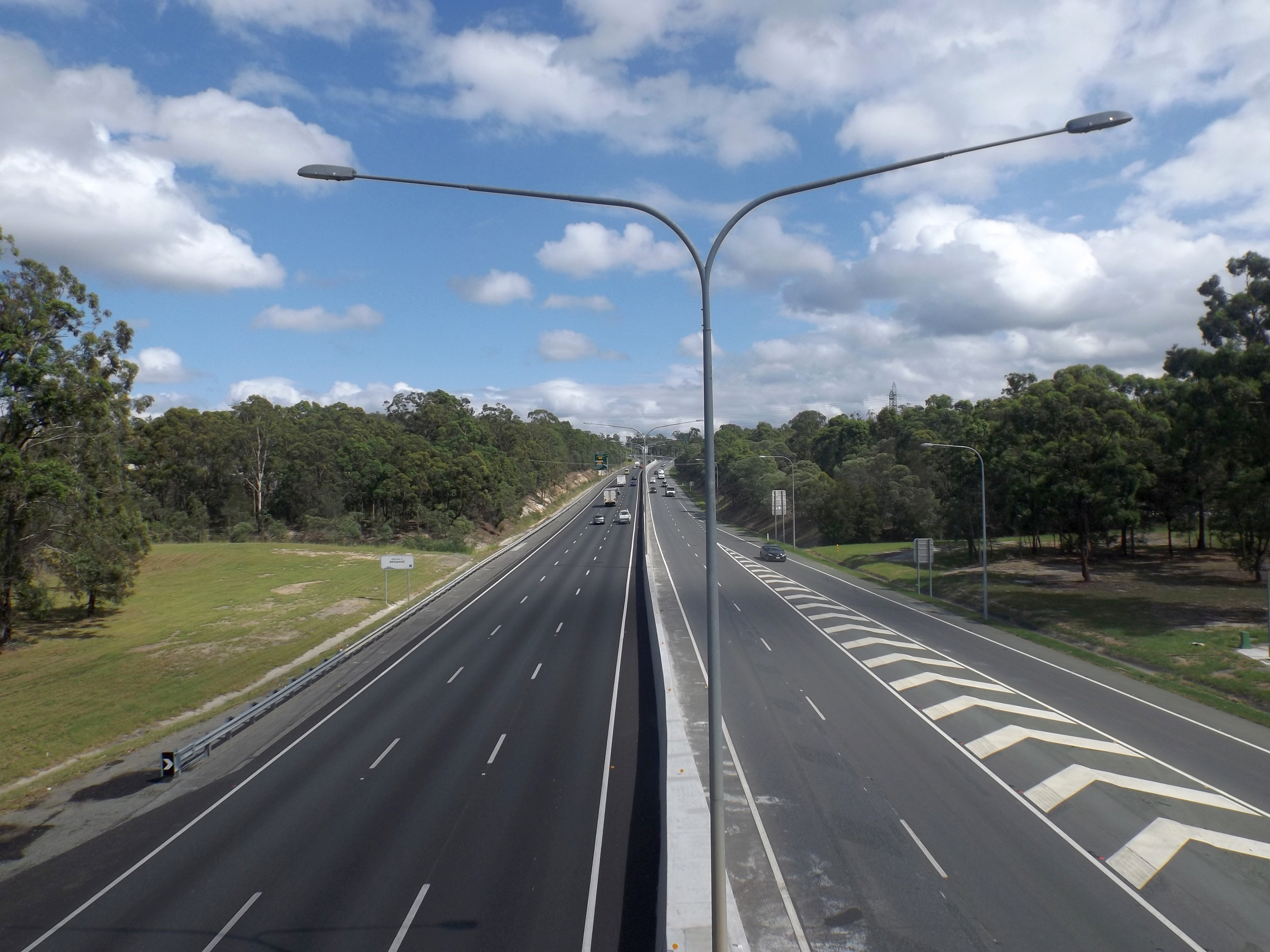
M6 Logan Motorway

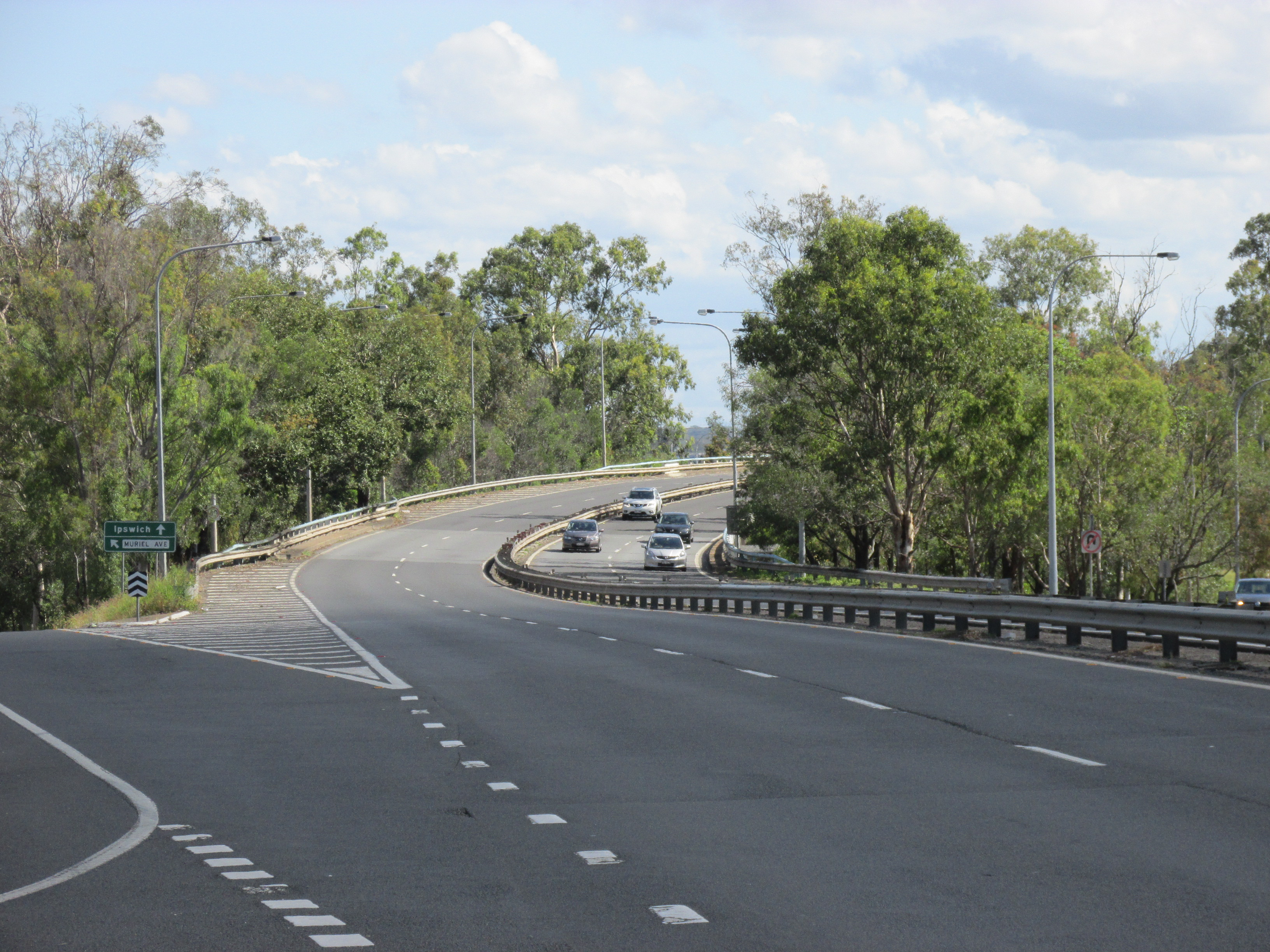
M7 Ipswich Motorway

== South Australia ==
In South Australia, expressway may refer to a controlled access highway with no at-grade intersections or a limited access road of slightly lower standard with at-grade intersections at some locations.

Unlike some other states, South Australia only uses the 'M' designation on grade separated freeways

- Princes Highway (SE Freeway to Tailem Bend)
- South Eastern Freeway
- Port Wakefield Road (Expressway grade road from Virginia to Port Wakefield)

- Northern Expressway
- North–South Motorway (incomplete, under construction in stages)
- Southern Expressway

- Port River Expressway
- Salisbury Highway – freeway grade from Port Wakefield Road to North–South Motorway

- Gawler Bypass – freeway grade road

=== Under construction ===
- North–South Motorway: River Torrens to Darlington upgrade of South Road under construction

=== Gallery ===
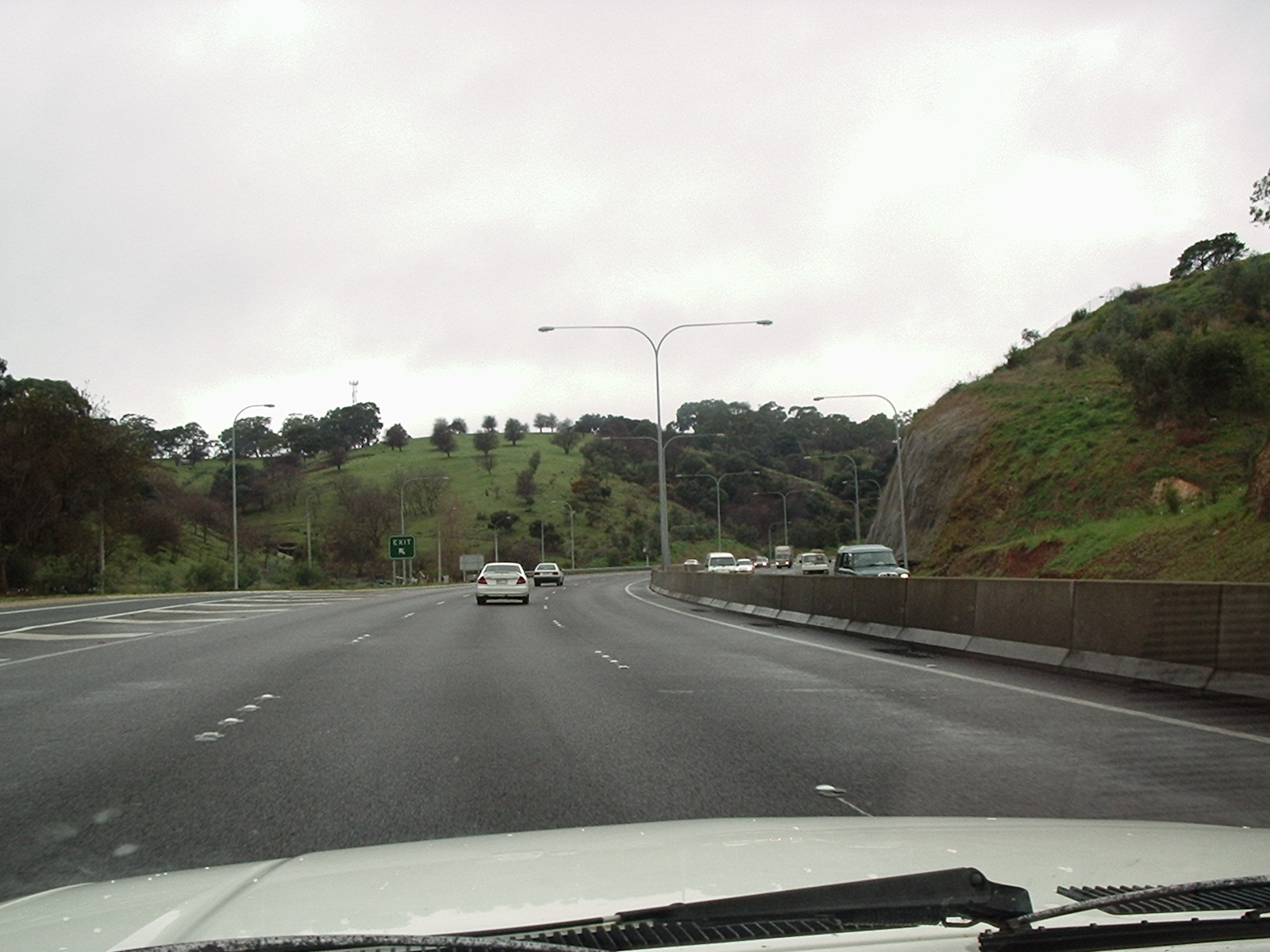
M1 South Eastern Freeway

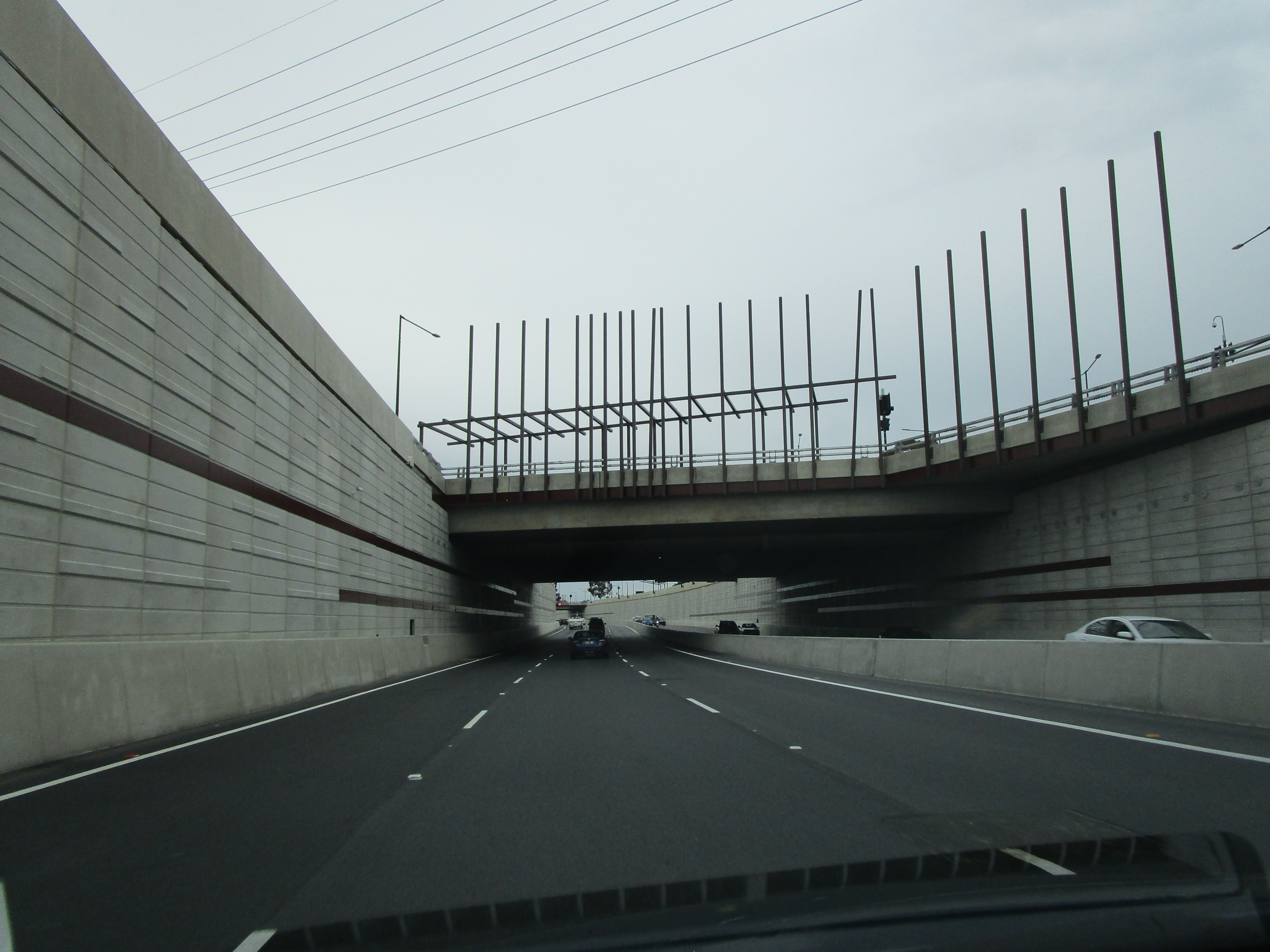
M2 North-South Motorway

== Tasmania ==
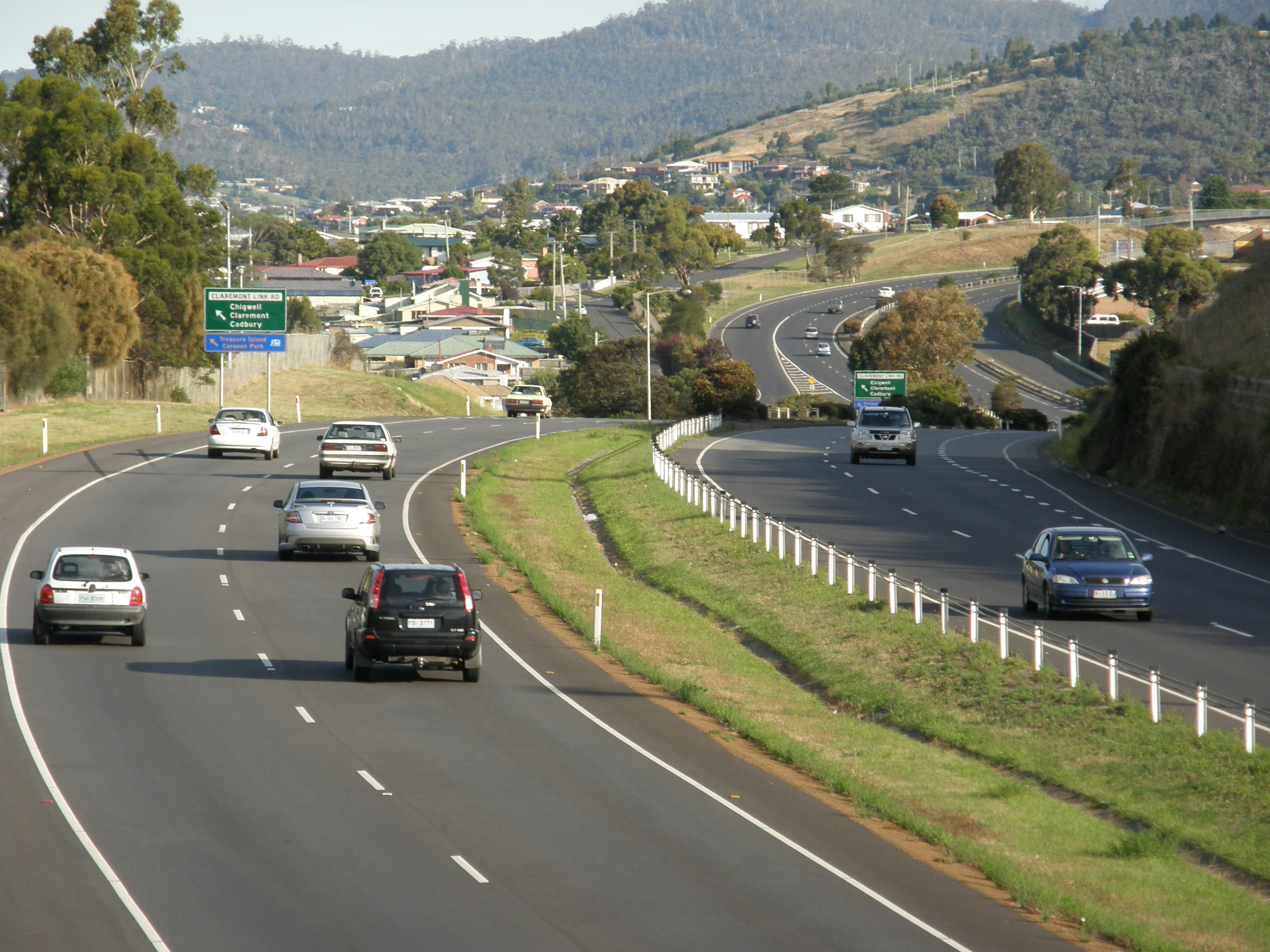
The Brooker Highway at Claremont

While Tasmania's highway network has been constructed to a high standard, its grade-separated freeway network is limited. In the past, Hobart and Launceston have each had comprehensive transport studies conducted, proposing grade-separated freeways running through and around them. While some of these roads have been constructed, the majority are limited access featuring at-grade intersections. Devonport and Burnie are the only major population centres with freeway standard roads linking each other. There have been repeated proposals in recent years to fully upgrade the Midland Highway to grade-separated freeway standard.
This List is limited to Tasmania's freeway-standard roads.

=== Hobart region ===
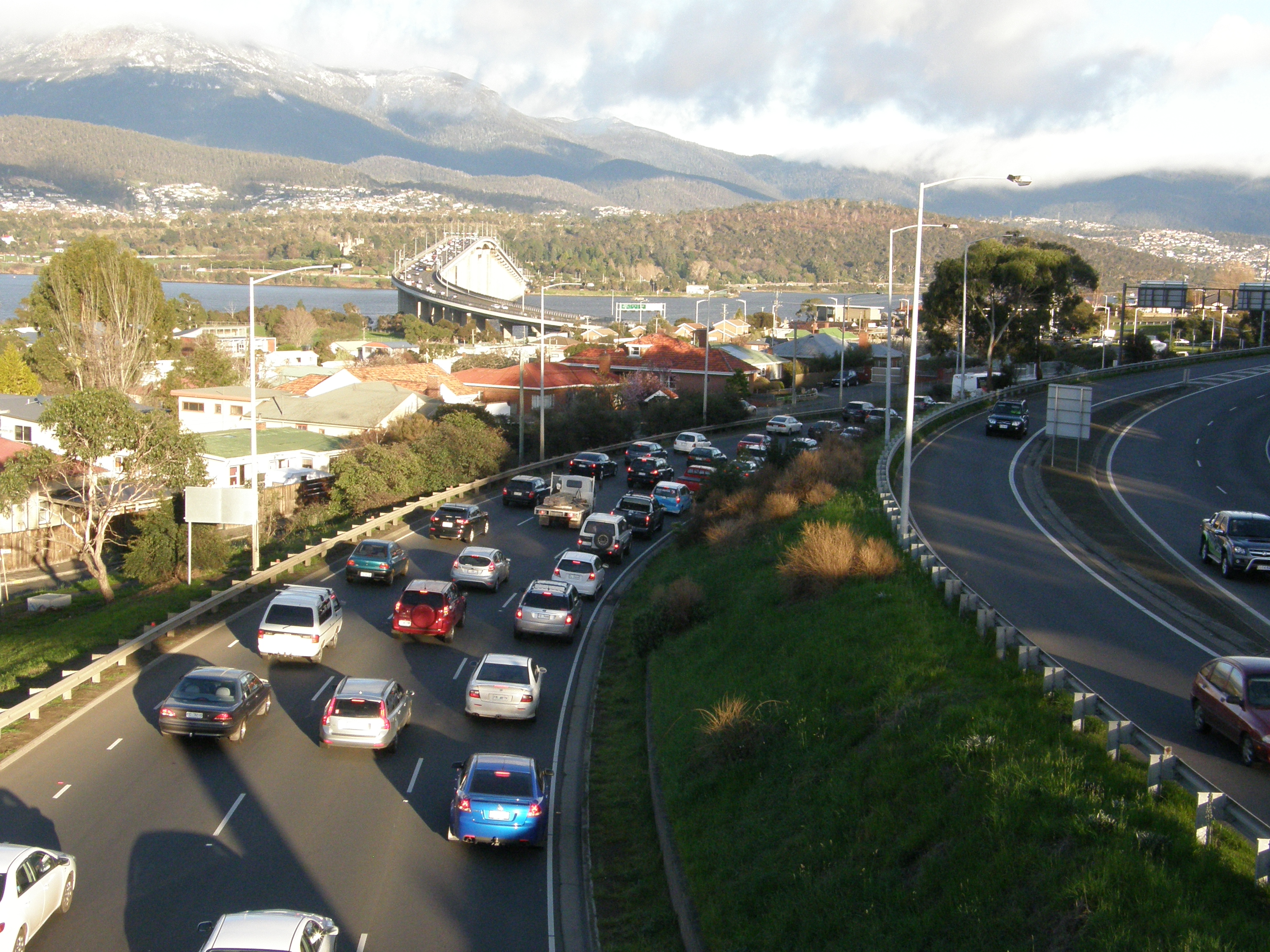
Tasman Highway approaching the Hobart central business district

- Brooker Highway (Rosetta to Granton)
- Midland Highway (Brighton Bypass)

- Tasman Highway (Tasman Bridge to Hobart Airport)

- Southern Outlet (Hobart to Kingston)

- Channel Highway (Kingston Bypass)

=== Rural region ===
- Bass Highway (Burnie to Devonport and Prospect to Illawarra Main Road)
- Midland Highway (South Launceston to Breadalbane)

== Victoria ==
Victoria has the second largest number (behind New South Wales) and highest density of freeways in Australia, with the majority being located in Melbourne City or the metropolitan areas. While most of Australia has a low population density over a large area, where towns are sparse or located a significant distance from each other; Victoria has towns located throughout the entire state, with large numbers of inhabitants, in both urban and rural areas (many of which are major) such as Ballarat or Bendigo. In addition to the roads listed below, Victoria has a number of dual carriageway standard Highways that are given an "M" designation. Whilst these roads are not officially Freeway standard, many of them may have a number of grade-separated intersections along the route. These routes are not listed below.

=== Melbourne region (urban freeways) ===
- Freeways within Greater Melbourne, speed limit varies between 60 km/h and 100 km/h.

- CityLink (Southern Link, Fully electronically tolled)
- Monash Freeway
- Princes Freeway (East) (from Narre Warren to Pakenham, continues past Pakenham as Rural Freeway)
- Princes Freeway (West) (from Laverton North to Werribee, continues past Werribee as Rural Freeway)
- West Gate Freeway (Electronically tolled for heavy vehicles just west of Millers Road. Hyde Street ramps are fully electronically tolled for all vehicles)

Note: "East" and "West" sections of Princes Freeway are officially part of the same freeway and route corridor.

- CityLink (Western Link, Fully electronically tolled)
- Tullamarine Freeway

- Eastern Freeway
- EastLink (Fully electronically tolled)
- Frankston Freeway

- West Gate Tunnel (Fully electronically tolled)

- Western Freeway (from Derrimut to Melton West, continues past Melton West as Rural Freeway) – Not entirely freeway standard, In Rockbank there is residential property, business and local road access with 90 km/h speed limit.

- Mornington Peninsula Freeway

- Hume Freeway (from Thomastown to Wallan, continues past Wallan as Rural Freeway) – Not entirely freeway standard, In Kalkallo there is residential property, business and local road access with 80 km/h speed limit.

- Calder Freeway (from Essendon North to Sunbury, continues past Sunbury as Rural Freeway) – Not entirely freeway standard, In Calder Park there is business and local road access with 80 km/h speed limit.

- Metropolitan Ring Road
- Western Ring Road

- South Gippsland Freeway

Other freeway grade roads

These roads are officially designated by the Victorian Government as Freeways and may include some freeway signage, but are generally not considered part of the Melbourne freeway network.

- Airport Drive (from Western Ring Road to Sharps Road, officially Freeway grade road)
- Batman Avenue (from CityLink to Exhibition Street, officially Freeway grade road, Fully electronically tolled)

- Sunbury Road (from Tullamarine Freeway to south of Oaklands Road, officially Freeway grade road)

- Ringwood Bypass (from EastLink to Ringwood Street, officially Freeway grade road)

=== Rural region (rural freeways) ===
On freeways outside of Greater Melbourne, the speed limit varies between 80 km/h and 110 km/h.

- Princes Freeway (East) (continues at Pakenham towards Melbourne as Urban Freeway) – Not entirely freeway standard, In Yarragon and Trafalgar there is residential property, business and local road access with 60 km/h speed limit.
- Princes Freeway (West) (continues at Werribee towards Melbourne as Urban Freeway)
- Geelong Ring Road (officially part of Princes Freeway)

Note: "East" and "West" sections of Princes Freeway are officially part of the same freeway and route corridor.

- Western Freeway (continues at Melton West towards Melbourne as Urban Freeway)

- Hume Freeway (continues at Wallan towards Melbourne as Urban Freeway) – Not entirely freeway standard, In Avenel and West Wodonga there is local road access with 80 km/h speed limit.

- Goulburn Valley Freeway

- Calder Freeway (continues at Sunbury towards Melbourne as Urban Freeway)

=== Under construction ===
- North East Link – Under major construction, expected to be complete in 2028.

- Western Highway Duplication (Buangor to Stawell) – Commenced early construction in 2017, currently on hold due to environmental concerns

=== Gallery ===
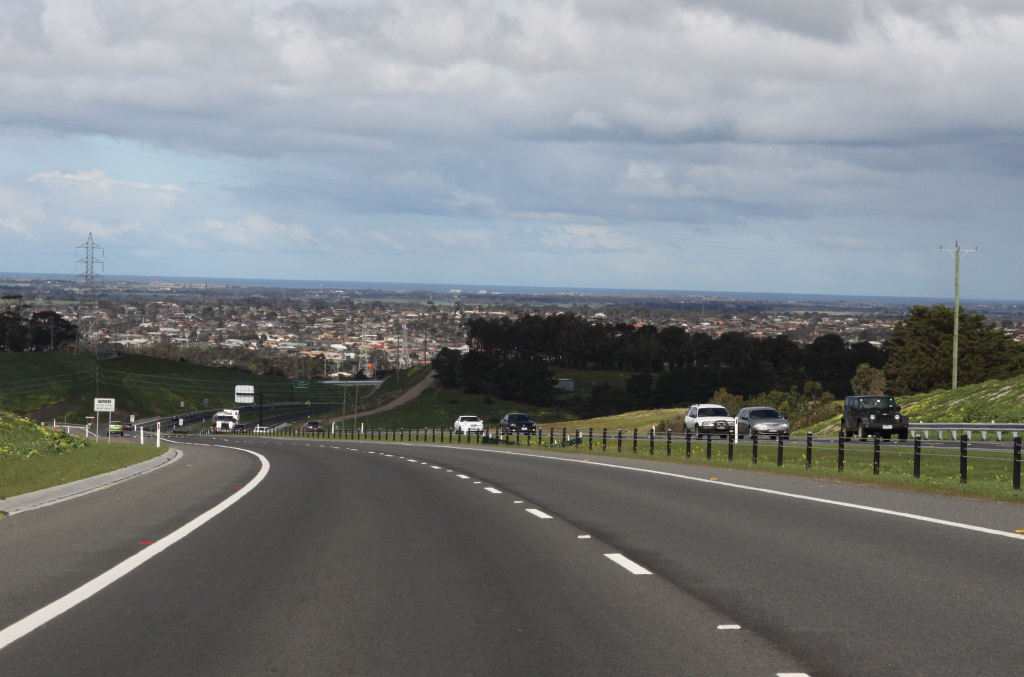
M1 Princes Freeway (Geelong Ring Road)

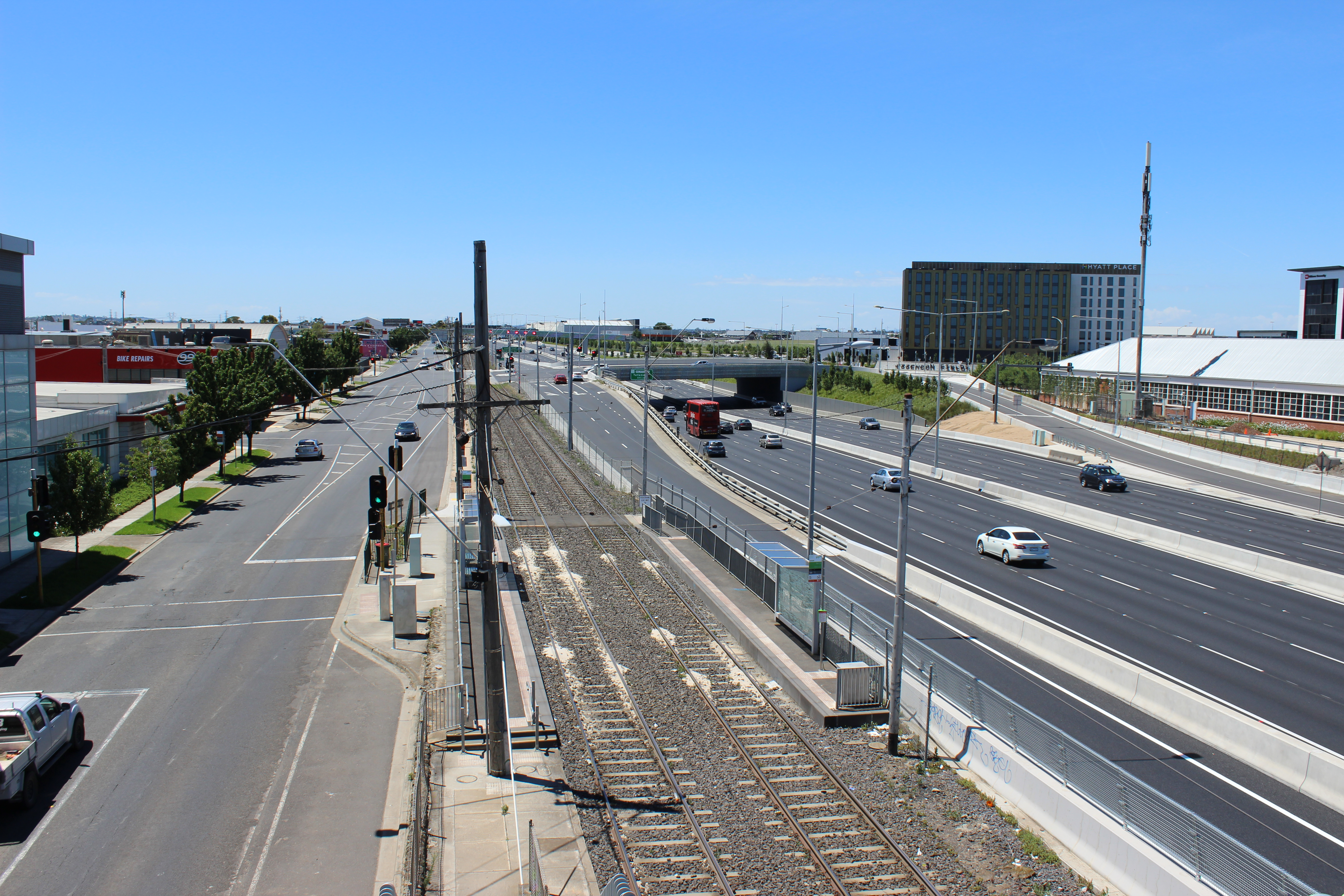
M2 Tullamarine Freeway

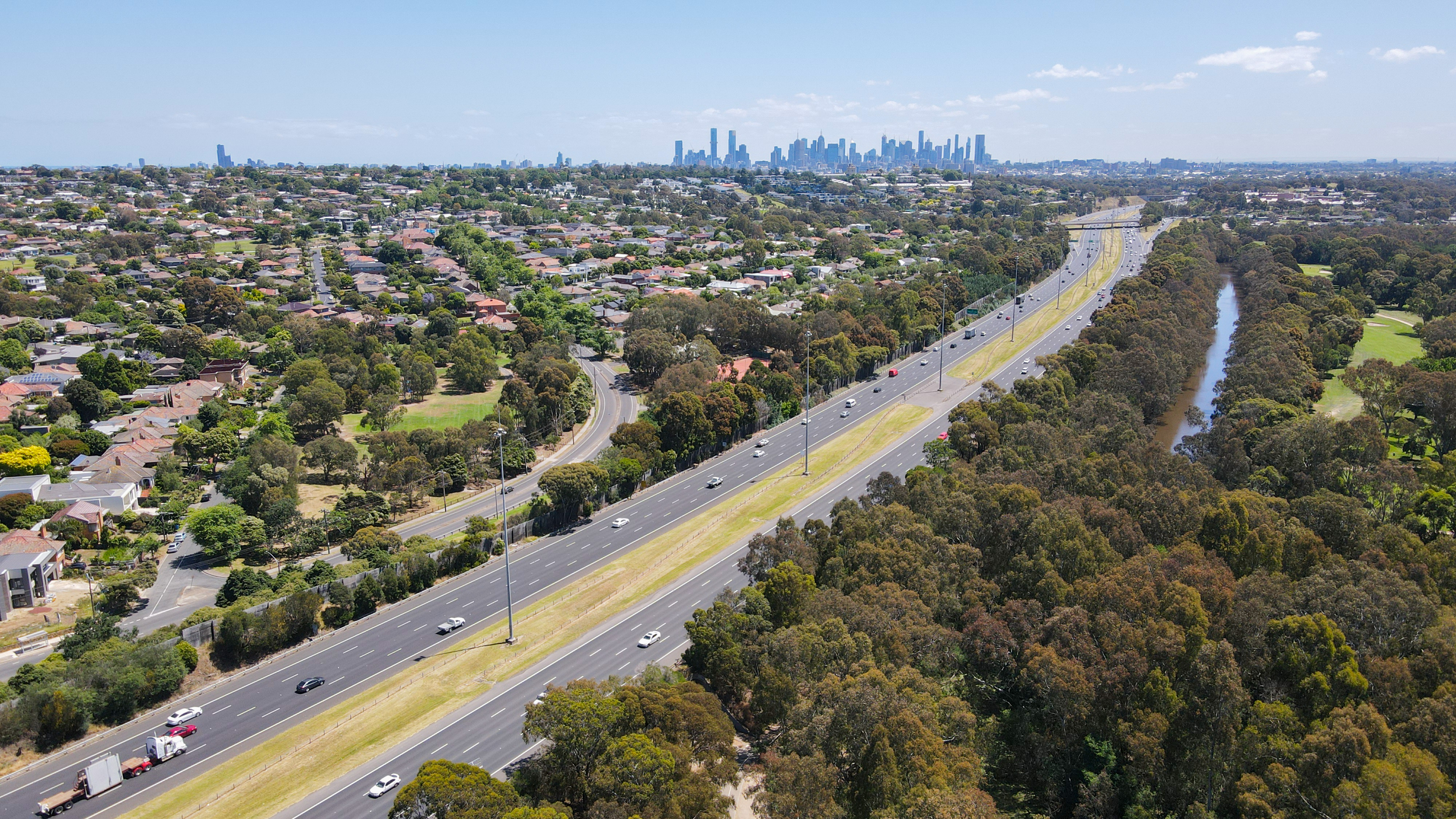
M3 Eastern Freeway

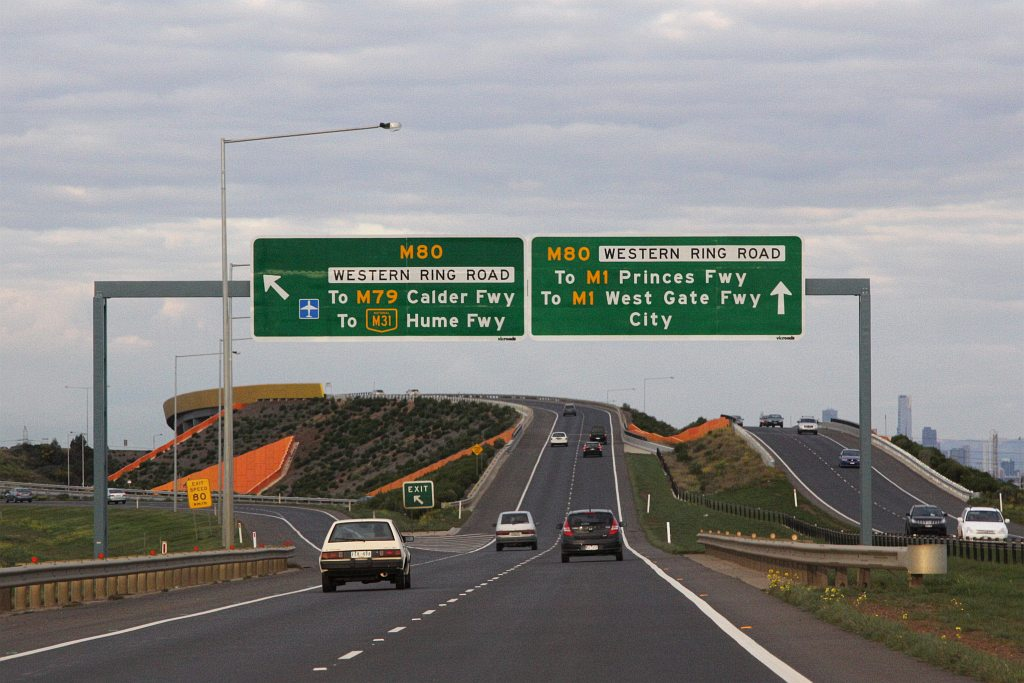
M8 Western Freeway

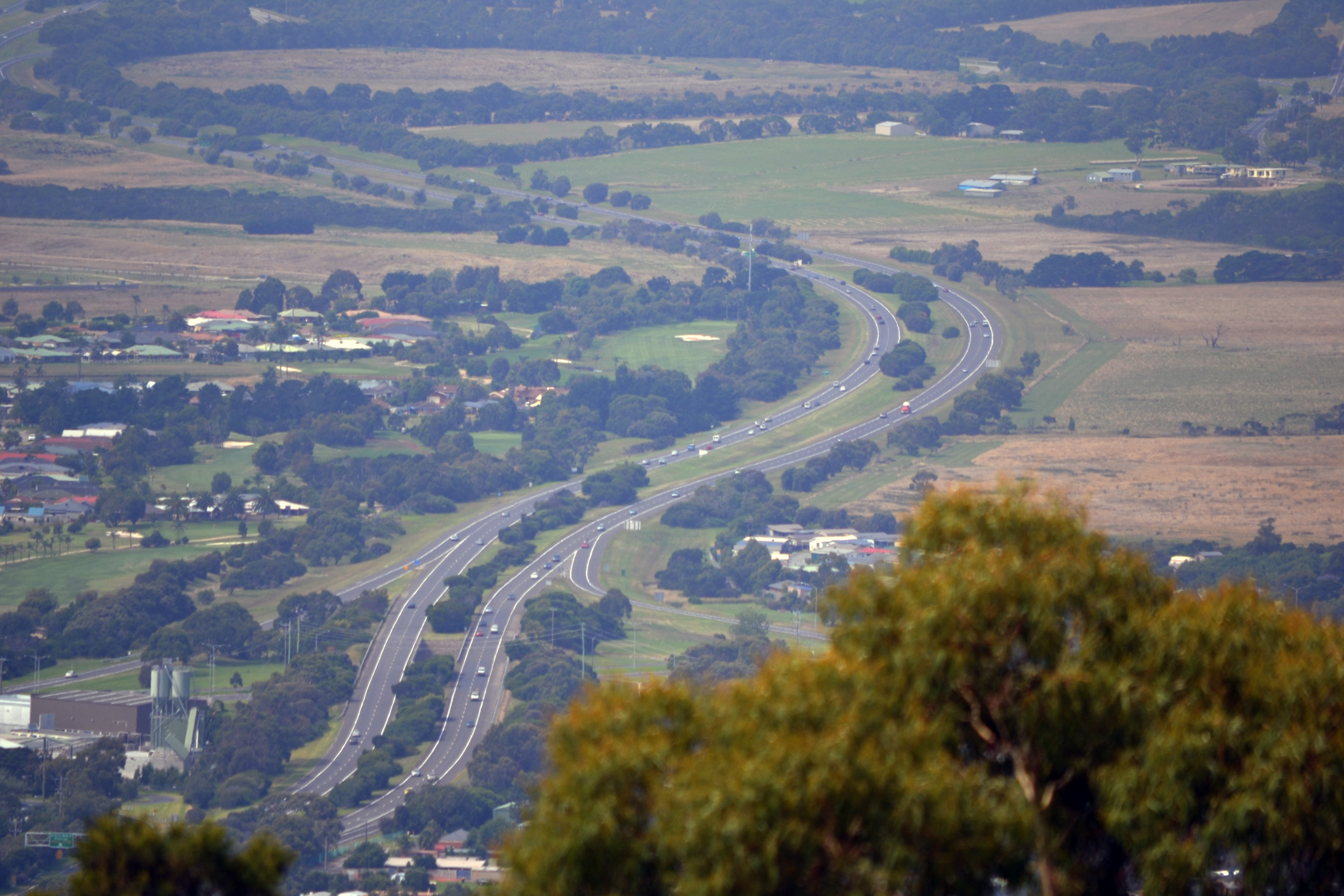
M11 Mornington Peninsula Freeway

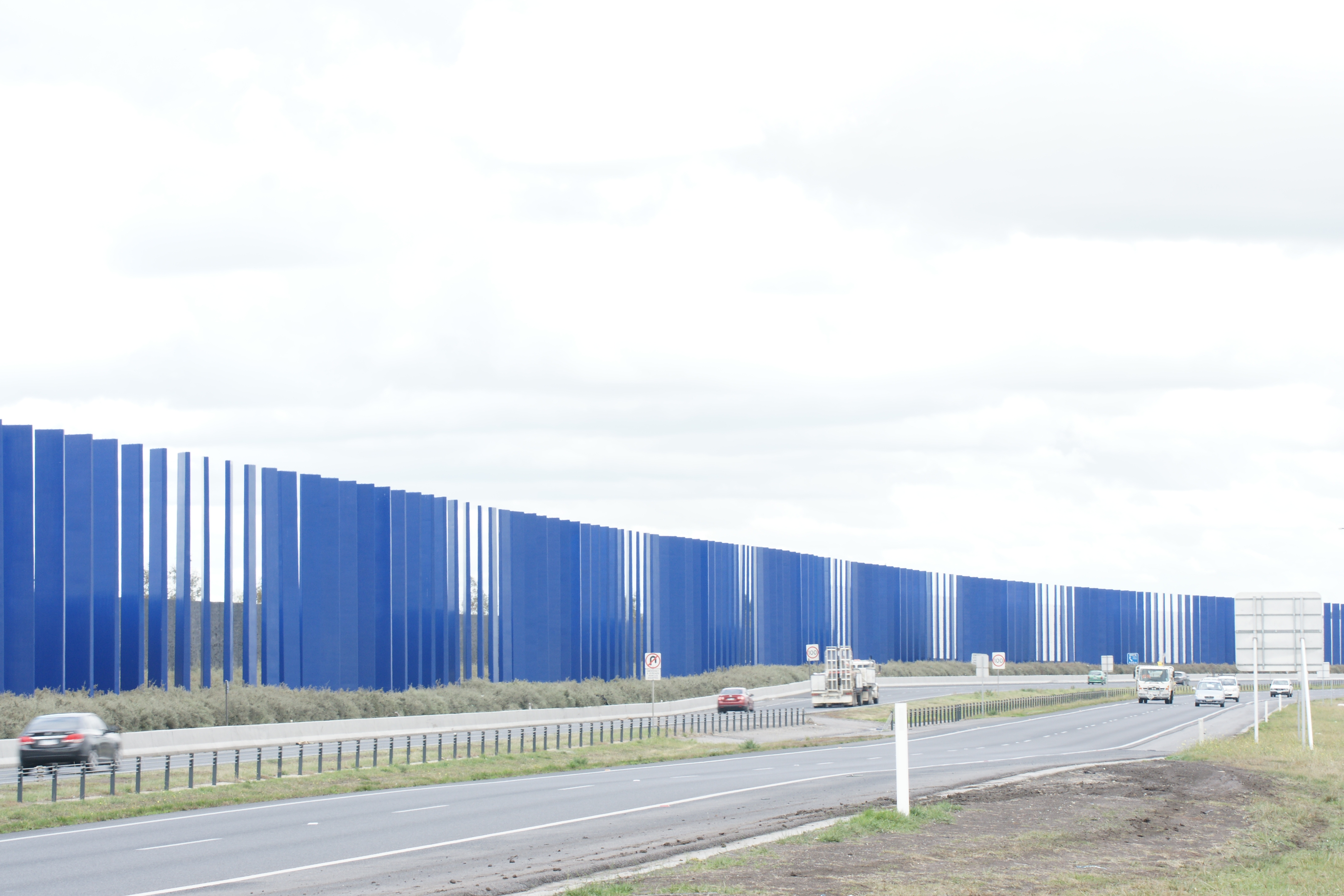
M31 Hume Freeway

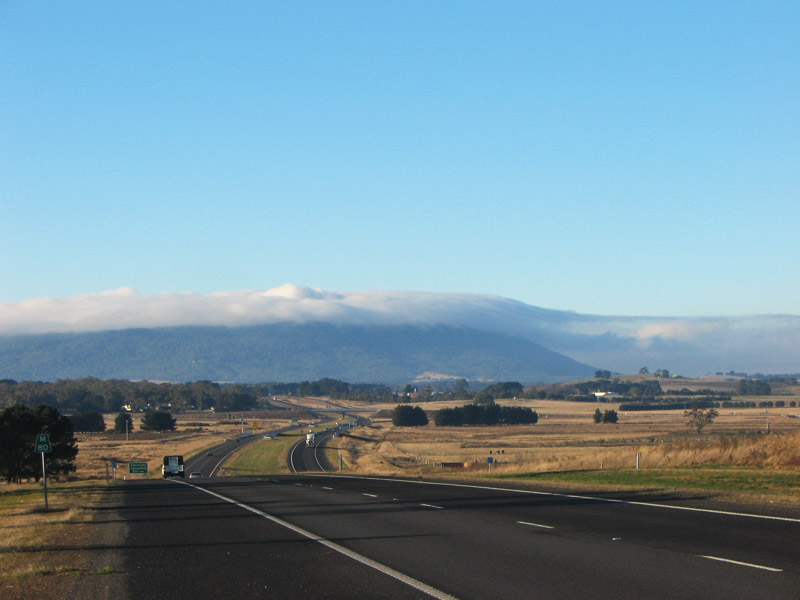
M79 Calder Freeway

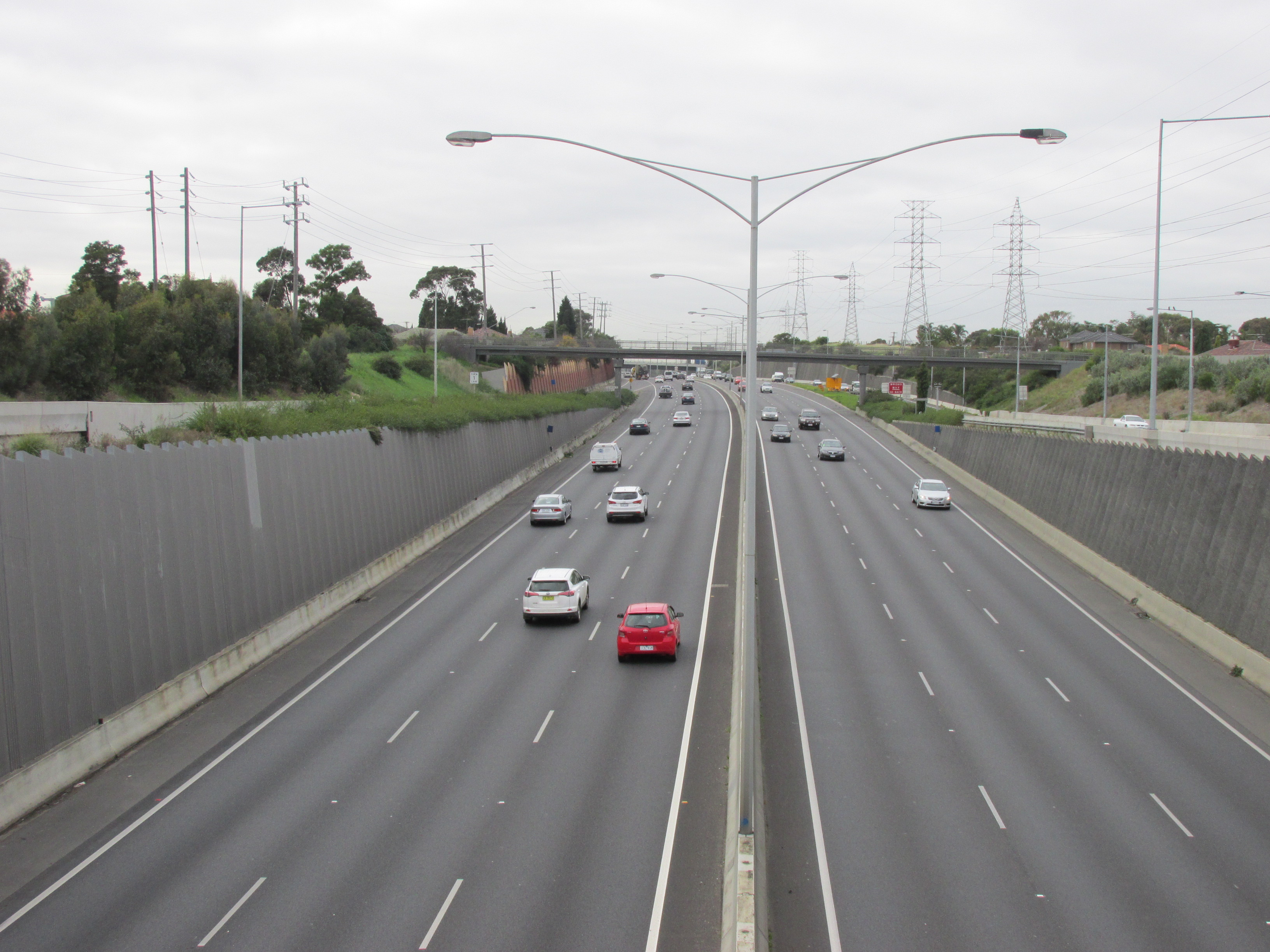
M80 Western Ring Road

== Western Australia ==
Western Australia has three named freeways – Kwinana Freeway, Mitchell Freeway, and Graham Farmer Freeway – but in addition has several highways that are in the process of being upgraded to full freeway standard and are considered part of the Perth freeway network. Their designation may remain as a highway though due to state restrictions on heavy vehicles (e.g. road trains) that are prevented by law from travelling on any road classed as a freeway.

=== Perth metro freeways ===
- Kwinana Freeway (also part of National Route 1 between Leach and Canning Highways)
- Mitchell Freeway

- Reid Highway (Erindale Road to Altone Road)
- Roe Highway (Morrison Road to Great Eastern Highway Bypass, Great Eastern Highway Bypass to Tonkin Highway, Tonkin Highway to Kwinana Freeway)

- Tonkin Highway (Great Northern Highway at Muchea to Hale Road, Mills Road to Champion Drive)

- Leach Highway (Airport Drive to Manning Road)

- Graham Farmer Freeway

=== Rural expressways / freeways ===
- Forrest Highway – Southern extension of Kwinana Freeway at Mandurah through to Bunbury
- Bussell Highway – Bunbury to Capel and from the south side of Capel to Busselton
- Wilman Wadandi Highway – freeway between Forrest Highway and South Western Highway
- Albany Ring Road – complete with exception of flyovers at Menang Drive and Chester Pass Road as of March 2025

=== Under construction ===
==== Perth ====
- Mitchell Freeway southbound widening – A third southbound lane is being added from Hodges Drive to Hepburn Avenue as well as an extra lane will be built from Hepburn Avenue entry ramp to Warwick Road exit ramp.
- Tonkin Gap project – the currently heavily congested section of Tonkin Highway between Collier Road and Great Eastern Highway upgraded to 3 lanes each way dual carriageway
- Mitchell Freeway southbound – Installation of smart freeway technology with ramp metering from Hester Avenue to Vincent Street
- Tonkin Highway Extension (Thomas Road to South Western Highway, Pinjarra)

=== In planning ===
==== Perth ====
- Mitchell Freeway Extension (Romeo Road to Moore River)
- Roe Highway Extension (Perth Freight Link) (Kwinana Freeway to Stirling Highway). Was under construction but this was halted at the last change of government. Its future remains unclear.
- Roe Highway upgrade (Great Eastern Highway Bypass to Great Northern Highway)
- Reid Highway upgrade (Tonkin Highway to Great Northern Highway)
- Tonkin Highway upgrade (Hale Road to Mills Road)
- Tonkin Highway upgrade (Champion Drive to Thomas Road)
- Whiteman-Yanchep Freeway (Tonkin Highway/Gnangara Road to Mitchell Freeway (proposed)/Yanchep Beach Road)
- Orrong Road Upgrade – Orrong Road to be upgraded to a 4 lane trenched expressway with service roads alongside from Graham Farmer Freeway to Leach Highway, rising onto a viaduct over Leach Highway and Division Street/Bell Street. May be extended in the future along Orrong and Welshpool Roads as far as Tonkin Highway.
- Great Eastern Highway Bypass, where all current at grade intersections are planned to be removed and the road upgraded to full freeway standard.

==== Rural ====
- Busselton Outer Bypass (BOB), outer freeway-grade bypass of Busselton from Sues Road to Marbellup Road in Vasse
- Perth–Adelaide Freeway "Orange Route" – (Roe Highway, Stratton to Great Eastern Highway bypass at Northam)

=== Gallery ===
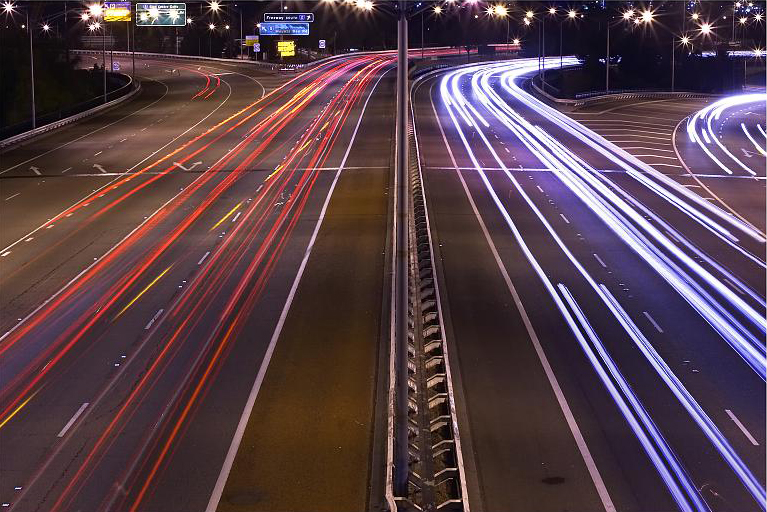
Mitchell Freeway

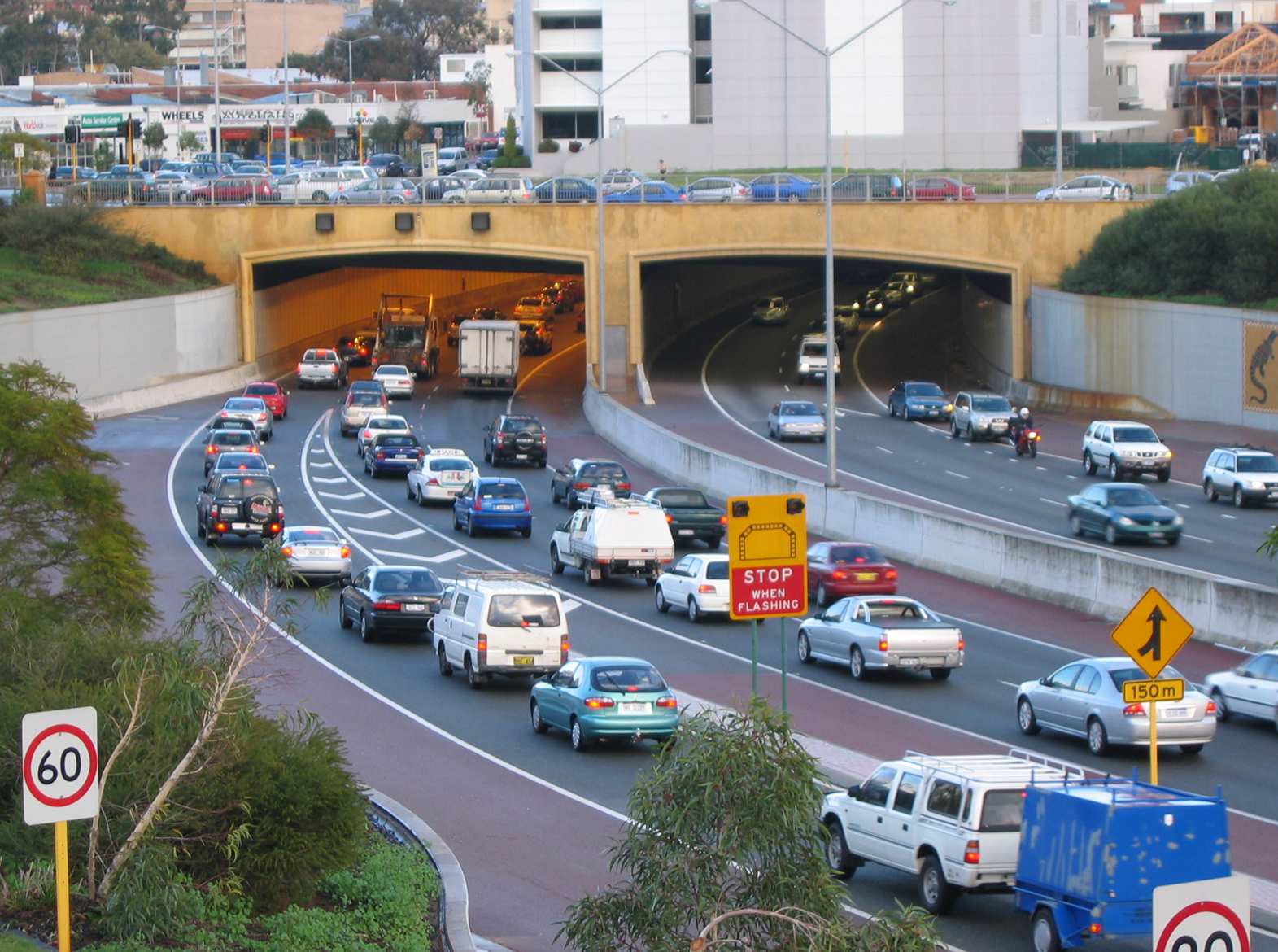
Graham Farmer Freeway

== See also ==
- Highways in Australia
- Highway 1
- National Highway (Australia)
- Transport in Australia
- Road transport in Australia
- Toll roads in Australia
- List of Australian airports
- List of Australian ports
