= Strathalbyn, Western Australia =

Strathalbyn
- Suburb
- Coordinates: 28°45′11″S 114°38′46″E
- Country: Australia
- State: Western Australia
- City: Geraldton
- LGA(s): City of Greater Geraldton
- Location: 5 km (3.1 mi) NE of Geraldton

Government
  - State electorate(s): Geraldton
  - Federal division(s): Durack

Area
  - Total: 1.7 km^{2} (0.66 sq mi)

Population
  - Total(s): 1,165 (SAL 2021)
- Postcode: 6530
Suburbs around Strathalbyn
Spalding	Spalding	Moresby
Webberton	Strathalbyn	Moresby
Wonthella	Woorree	Woorree

Strathalbyn is a northeastern suburb of Geraldton, Western Australia. Its local government area is the City of Greater Geraldton.

The suburb was gazetted in 1985.

== Geography ==
Strathalbyn is located 5.3 kilometres (3.3 mi) northeast of Geraldton's central business district on the south bank of the Chapman River, and is bounded by Place Road to the south, Fallowfield Street to the west and Koojarra Street to the north.

== Demographics ==
In the 2006 census, Strathalbyn had a population of 1,335, a growth of 228 from the 2001 census.

Strathalbyn residents had a median age of 33, and median incomes were above-average for the Geraldton region — $554 per week compared with $461 per week. The population of Strathalbyn was predominantly Australian-born - 81.8% as at the 2001 census - while 3.5% were born in the United Kingdom. 4.27% reported one or more parents of Italian birth.

The most popular religious affiliations in descending order in the 2006 census were Roman Catholic, no religion, Anglican and Uniting.

== Facilities ==
Strathalbyn contains a recreation reserve, Muir Park, as well as a private school, Geraldton Christian College.
