= Tenindewa, Western Australia =

Tenindewa
- Town
- Coordinates: 28°37′18.22″S 116°22′0.87″E
- Country: Australia
- State: Western Australia
- LGA(s): City of Greater Geraldton
- Location: 484 km (301 mi) north of Perth; 15 km (9.3 mi) WSW of Mullewa
- Established: 1913

Government
  - State electorate(s): Moore
  - Federal division(s): Durack

Area
  - Total: 723.1 km^{2} (279.2 sq mi)
- Elevation: 199 m (653 ft)

Population
  - Total(s): 54 (SAL 2021)
- Postcode: 6632

Tenindewa is a small town located between Geraldton and Mullewa along the Geraldton – Mount Magnet Road in the Mid West region of Western Australia. At the 2006 census, the Tenindewa district had a population of 143.

The railway from Geraldton and Mullewa was constructed in 1894 and passed through the area. By 1908 a station was opened in the location of the town and had the name 55 mile siding. Later in 1908 the name of the station was changed to the Aboriginal name of a nearby gully, Kockatea. The name was changed again almost a year later to Tenindewa. The name is also Aboriginal in origin and its meaning is unknown. The townsite was gazetted in 1913.

In 1932 the Wheat Pool of Western Australia announced that the town would have two grain elevators, each fitted with an engine, installed at the railway siding.

Tenindewa also had a CBH grain receival point from 1936 until 1974. The "beam" from the old weighbridge is located outside the historic store as a reminder of that time.

Tenindewa contained the last manual telephone exchange in Western Australia; it was closed on 13 April 1985.

On 21 December 2013 the Tenindewa Community celebrated 100 years since its first Christmas tree. Kathleen Palmer emigrated to Australia from England in 1914 aged 14 years. She married Alec Rumble in 1922; they were the first couple to marry in the Mullewa Anglican Church. Kathleen wrote a short story in 1994 about her pioneering period in the Tenindewa area, including a mention of that first tree:

The first Public Christmas Tree was held at the little settlement in 1914. A few public spirited people organized it in the Railway Goods Shed.
