= Gympie Arterial Road =

Freeway in Brisbane, Australia

Gympie Arterial Road Queensland

General information
- Type: Freeway
- Length: 4.7 km (2.9 mi)
- Route number(s): M3

Major junctions
- South end: Gympie Road; Carseldine, Queensland
- Linkfield Road; Strathpine Road
- North end: Bruce Highway; Bald Hills, Queensland

Location(s)
- Major suburbs / towns: Bald Hills

Highway system
- Highways in Australia; National Highway • Freeways in Australia; Highways in Queensland

The Gympie Arterial Road is a freeway in the northern suburbs of Brisbane in Queensland, Australia. The road starts in Carseldine at Gympie Road and terminates at Pine River where it continues as the Bruce Highway. It is three lanes in each direction from Carseldine to the Strathpine Road intersection, and two lanes to the Gateway Motorway, and then four lanes to Pine River

In 2000, a lane duplication was completed and an exit lane was closed at the Strathpine Road off-ramp, with 2 new lanes opened along with traffic lights in its place.

== Upgrades ==
=== Strathpine Road intersection ===
A project to improve the intersection with Strathpine Road, at a cost of $30 million, was completed in August 2022.

=== Linkfield Road intersection ===
A project to upgrade the Linkfield Road intersection, at a cost of $125 million, was starting the design stage early in 2022.

== Major intersections ==
The entire road is in the Brisbane local government area.

Location	km	mi	Destinations	Notes
Carseldine	0	0.0	Gympie Road – north – Bald Hills / south – Aspley	Southern end of Gympie Arterial Road (M3); No northbound entry from Bald Hills. No southbound entry or exit.
Carseldine – Bald Hills boundary	0.75	0.47	– Linkfield Road (State Route 40) – west – Brendale east – Bracken Ridge, Fitzgibbon	No northbound exit. Previous northbound exit (on Gympie Road) provides access to Linkfield Road.
Bald Hills	2.3	1.4	– Strathpine Road (State Route 58) – west – Strathpine; Hoyland Street – east – Bracken Ridge	Provides access via Bracken Ridge to Gateway Motorway
Bald Hills	4.7	2.9	– Gateway Motorway (M1) – south–east – Deagon	Northern end of Gympie Arterial Road. No northbound exit.
1.000 mi = 1.609 km; 1.000 km = 0.621 mi: Incomplete access

== See also ==
- Freeways in Australia
- Freeways in Brisbane
