= Moonyoonooka, Western Australia =

Moonyoonooka
- Town
- Coordinates: 28°46′56″S 114°43′20″E
- Country: Australia
- State: Western Australia
- LGA(s): City of Greater Geraldton

Government
  - State electorate(s): Geraldton
  - Federal division(s): Durack

Area
  - Total: 158.9 km^{2} (61.4 sq mi)

Population
  - Total(s): 286 (SAL 2021)
- Postcode: 6532

Moonyoonooka is a rural locality on the eastern margin of Geraldton, in the Mid West region of Western Australia. It contains Geraldton Airport. At the 2016 census, Moonyoonooka had a population of 245. Of employed people, 22.4% worked in the vegetable horticulture industry. Notably 9.1% of residents speak Vietnamese at home, eight times the national average.

Moonyoonooka is the site of Glengarry Homestead, the birthplace of Edith Cowan, the first Australian woman to serve as a member of parliament.
