= John Drummond (Australian settler) =

Settler of Western Australia

John Nicol Drummond
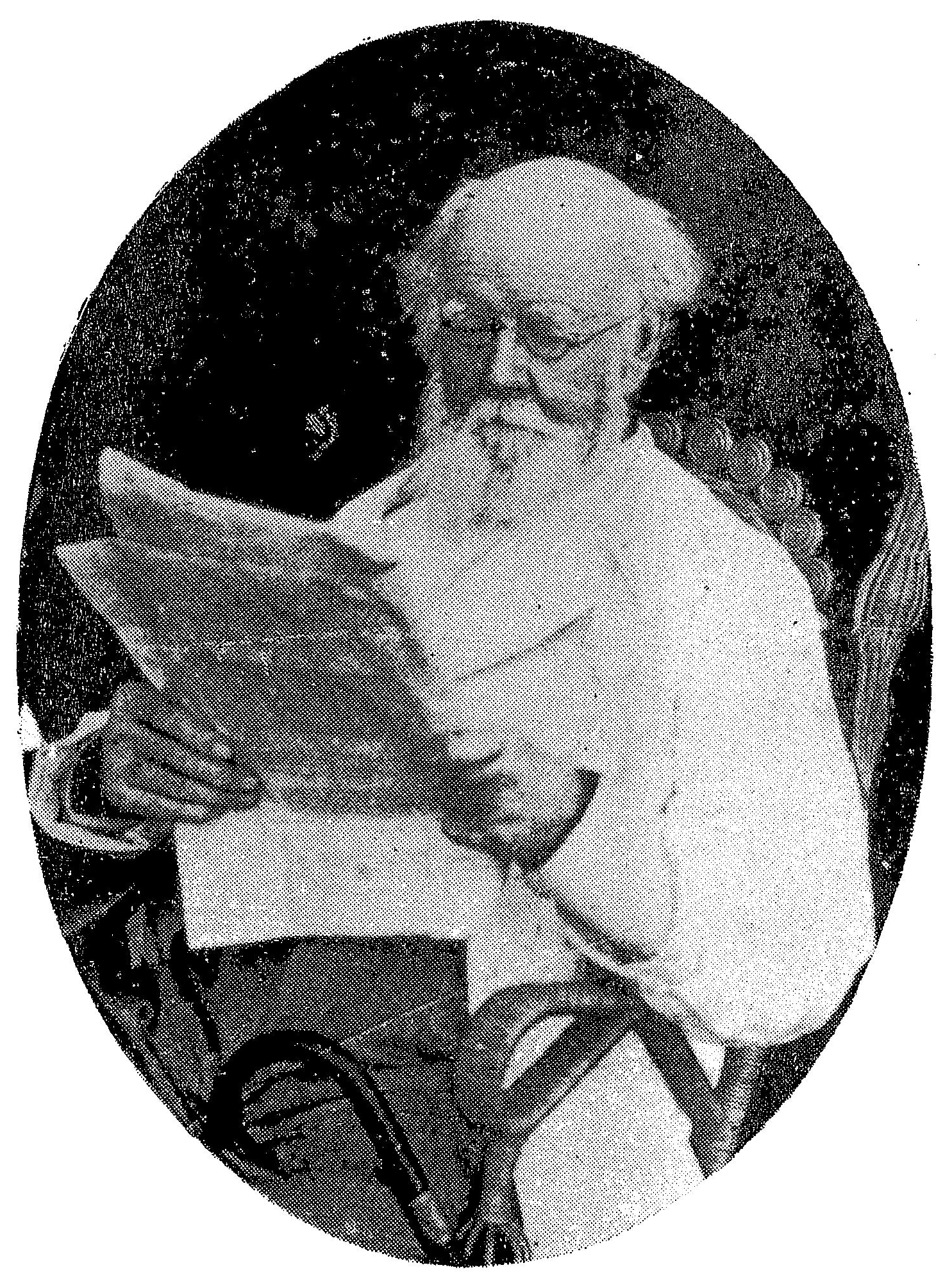
- John Nicol Drummond
- Born: 1816; County Cork, Ireland
- Died: 7 July 1906; Drummond Cove, Western Australia
- Office: Inspector of Native Police of Western Australia
- Term: 1839 – 1857
- Criminal charge: Grievous bodily harm (1877)
- Criminal penalty: 3 years in custody
- Criminal status: Released; time served
- Spouse: Mary Eliza Shaw
- Children: Rose Brown (born 1874), adopted
- Father: James Drummond
- Relatives: James Drummond (brother); Johnston Drummond (brother); Thomas Drummond (uncle)

John Nicol Drummond (1816–1906) was an early settler in Western Australia. He became the colony's first 'Inspector of Native Police', and helped to explore the Champion Bay district before becoming one of the district's pioneer pastoralists. He played a leading role in the massacre of 30 Yamatji people at Bootenal Springs in 1854.

== Early years and background ==
The fourth child of botanist James Drummond, John Drummond was born in County Cork in 1816. Among his brothers were James, who would become a Member of the Western Australian Legislative Council; and Johnston, who became a respected botanical collector. An uncle, Thomas, had accompanied John Franklin in his explorations into the Northwest Territories of Canada in 1819–22.

In 1829 the Drummond family emigrated to the Swan River Colony in what is now Western Australia, arriving on board Parmelia on 1 June. John Drummond would have spent much of his youth helping with the family farm at Toodyay. As he grew older, he spent more and more time with the local indigenous Australians of the area, going on long hunting expeditions that took him away from home for many weeks at a time. In 1839 he caused a scandal in the colony when it became widely known that he had been "lent" a wife by the local Noongar people.

== Police career ==
Late in 1839, a woman and her baby were murdered by natives near York, and Governor John Hutt responded by establishing a special police force known as the Native Police. As a man well known and widely respected by the local tribes, and familiar with Indigenous language and customs, Drummond was appointed the colony's first 'Inspector of Native Police'. He was stationed in York and allowed to reside in the survey office and courthouse building. He made regular patrols of the Avon Valley district, and continued to attend corroborees and tribal gatherings. He became a valued tracker and negotiator, and earned the respect of both colonists and Ballardong Noongar people.

In 1845, Drummond's brother Johnston was murdered by a Noongar warrior named Kabinger. After obtaining a warrant, John Drummond set out to avenge his brother's murder. He tracked Kabinger for two weeks, eventually finding him at sundown on 15 August. According to the journal of Gerard de Courcy Lefroy:

He pulled up his horse, which is rather a hot little beggar, and asked him why he murdered his brother... the awful ghastly look the scoundrel gave him nearly unnerved him for the moment... but when he saw the spear shifted... his horse plunging all the time he put his gun up and fired and drove the ball in his left side and out his right. He fell to the ground on his face and buried his teeth in the grounds and expired.... It was a beautiful shot – fifty yards [46 m] – he never let his spears go.

Drummond reported Kabinger's death as having been done "in the execution of his duty while enforcing a warrant of arrest". Governor Hutt, who had already had a number of disputes with Drummond over his "independent attitude to officialdom", did not accept Drummond's version of events, and suspended him from the police force. However without Drummond's influence the Ballardong Noongar people caused the colonists of the district difficulties, so when Hutt returned to England at the end of the year, Drummond was immediately reappointed to the police at a lower rank.

In 1849, Drummond accompanied an overland party to the Champion Bay district, where a small mining settlement was being formed. He helped to handle a number of delicate and dangerous standoffs with the local Indigenous group there, and his return to Toodyay was greatly regretted. On returning to Toodyay, Drummond found himself constantly quarrelling with the newly appointed protector at York, Walkinshaw Cowan, who accused him of leaving his district while on duty. These accusations were probably correct, as Drummond was courting Mary Eliza Shaw of Guildford at the time. In April 1850, a court of inquiry was held at York to enquire into Cowan's complaints against Drummond. There were five specific charges by Cowan against Drummond. The first of these was that Drummond went drinking at the Kings Head Hotel with Aboriginal policeman Cowits and Tommy the Aboriginal mail carrier, and did not report or charge anyone. The court found the charges "not proved being frivoulous and vexatious", though Drummond was suspended from duties for a month. Shortly afterwards the problem was solved by transferring Drummond to Champion Bay as First Constable of the newly established police force there.

In 1850, Drummond acted as a police escort for a group of pastoralists including John Sydney Davis, Major Logue, William and Lockier Burges, Thomas and Kenneth Brown, and Drummond's brother James, in overlanding stock from York to Greenough. Later he accompanied an exploration party including Augustus Gregory, John Septimus Roe, James Drummond Jr and Samuel Pole Phillips, in exploring the land around the Upper Irwin.

On 5 June 1854, Drummond led a group of colonists in the massacre of 30 Aboriginal people at Bootenal near Geraldton.

== Pastoralist ==
In 1851, Drummond acquired a block of 1,600 hectares (4,000 acres) of land next to the police reserve at what is now known as Drummond Cove. He named the property White Peak Station. Shortly afterwards he obtained a pastoral lease over 1,600 hectares (4,000 acres) of land in the area, adding 1,200 hectares (3,000 acres) the following year. In February 1852 he took leave, travelling to Guildford where he married Mary Eliza Shaw. They would have one daughter, who would die in infancy.

A rich lode of copper ore was discovered on Drummond's pastoral lease in 1853, and Drummond purchased 20 hectares (50 acres) of his lease to secure the mining rights. He then placed management of the mine in the hands of George Shenton, who appointed Joseph Horrocks superintendent. The Gwalla mine ultimately became part of the town of Northampton.

By 1857, Drummond had been promoted to Sub-Inspector of Police at Champion Bay, and owned valuable pastoral and mining interests in the area. That year, he was ordered to take charge of the police force at Albany, around 800 kilometres (500 mi) away. Unwilling to abandon his other interests, he resigned from the police force, thereafter focussing on his pastoral and agricultural interests.

In 1876, the Drummonds took in the orphaned child of Kenneth Brown (Rose, born 1874), who had been hanged for murdering his second wife.

In 1881, White Peak Station was sold to Edward Wittenoom.

== Criminal conviction and death ==
In 1877 Drummond was charged with wounding with intent to murder tenant farmer John Fisher at Redcliffe Farm, near Geraldton. He was found guilty of shooting Fisher with intent to do him grievous bodily harm, and sentenced to three years' penal servitude.

In 1895, at the age of 79, he was charged with stealing sheep from his neighbour Edward Wittenoom – a charge of "feloniously killing three or more sheep, with intent to feloniously steal the carcases of the said sheep". A jury returned a not guilty verdict.

Drummond died at Seaview Cottage, Drummond Cove, in 1906. He was the third-last surviving colonist to arrive on the Parmelia, the others remaining being his sister Euphemia Macintosh, and Mary Ann Strickland (Hokin).
