= Johnston Drummond =

Settler of Western Australia

Johnston Drummond (1820 – 13 July 1845) was an early settler of Western Australia who became a respected botanical and zoological collector.

== Biography ==
The son of botanist James Drummond, Drummond was born in County Cork, Ireland in 1820. Among his brothers were James, who would become a Member of the Western Australian Legislative Council, and John Nicol Drummond, first Inspector of the Native Police. An uncle, Thomas, accompanied Sir John Franklin in his explorations into the Northwest Territories of Canada in 1819-22.

In 1829 the Drummond family emigrated to the Swan River Colony in what is now Western Australia, arriving on board the Parmelia on 1 June. Drummond spent much of his early life helping his father and brothers run their farm at their grant on the Swan River. Later the family relocated to Toodyay, where Drummond was again involved in running the farm.

Drummond developed a taste for botanical and zoological collecting from his father. By the age of fifteen he was making collections of native seeds for sale at Cape Town, and he also sold a collection of seeds to George Fletcher Moore, who sent them on to James Mangles. In 1839 he joined his father on a journey up the Salt River, making a collection of bird and mammal skins, and he later sold a collection of bird skins to Ludwig Preiss.

In 1841, Drummond joined an expedition in search of good squatting land to the east of their land at Toodyay. The expedition, which included James Drummond Snr and Samuel Pole Phillips under the command of Captain John Scully, discovered the vast tract of open pastoral land that is now known as the Victoria Plains.

Drummond made a number of other collecting expeditions, accompanying his father and the naturalist John Gilbert on an expedition to the Wongan Hills in early 1842, and later that year making an expedition to the Moore River, during which he collected the first specimen of the Black Kangaroo Paw, Macropidia fuliginosa. Over the next two years he made a number of collecting expeditions while engaged as a collector for John Gould, including a major expedition to King George Sound and along the south coast as far as Cape Riche.

In 1844, a severe recession placed the Drummond family in severe financial debt, and the family farm was lost. Drummond and his father began planning to make their entire living from collecting, discussing going to South Australia or India, but nothing came of it.

== Death ==
In the winter of 1845, Drummond discovered that a native named Kabinger had been stealing sheep. He warned Kabinger away from the station, and in response Kabinger threatened to spear him. On 4 July, Drummond went on a short journey to collect specimens, taking with him a number of natives including Kabinger's wife, with whom Drummond was apparently sleeping. In the middle of the night of 13 July, Kabinger appeared and drove two spears through Drummond's body. Drummond died shortly afterwards. Kabinger slept at the campsite that night, and took his wife away the next morning. He was shot dead by Drummond's brother, John Drummond, a few weeks later.
