= James Drummond (botanist) =

Australian botanist (1787–1863)

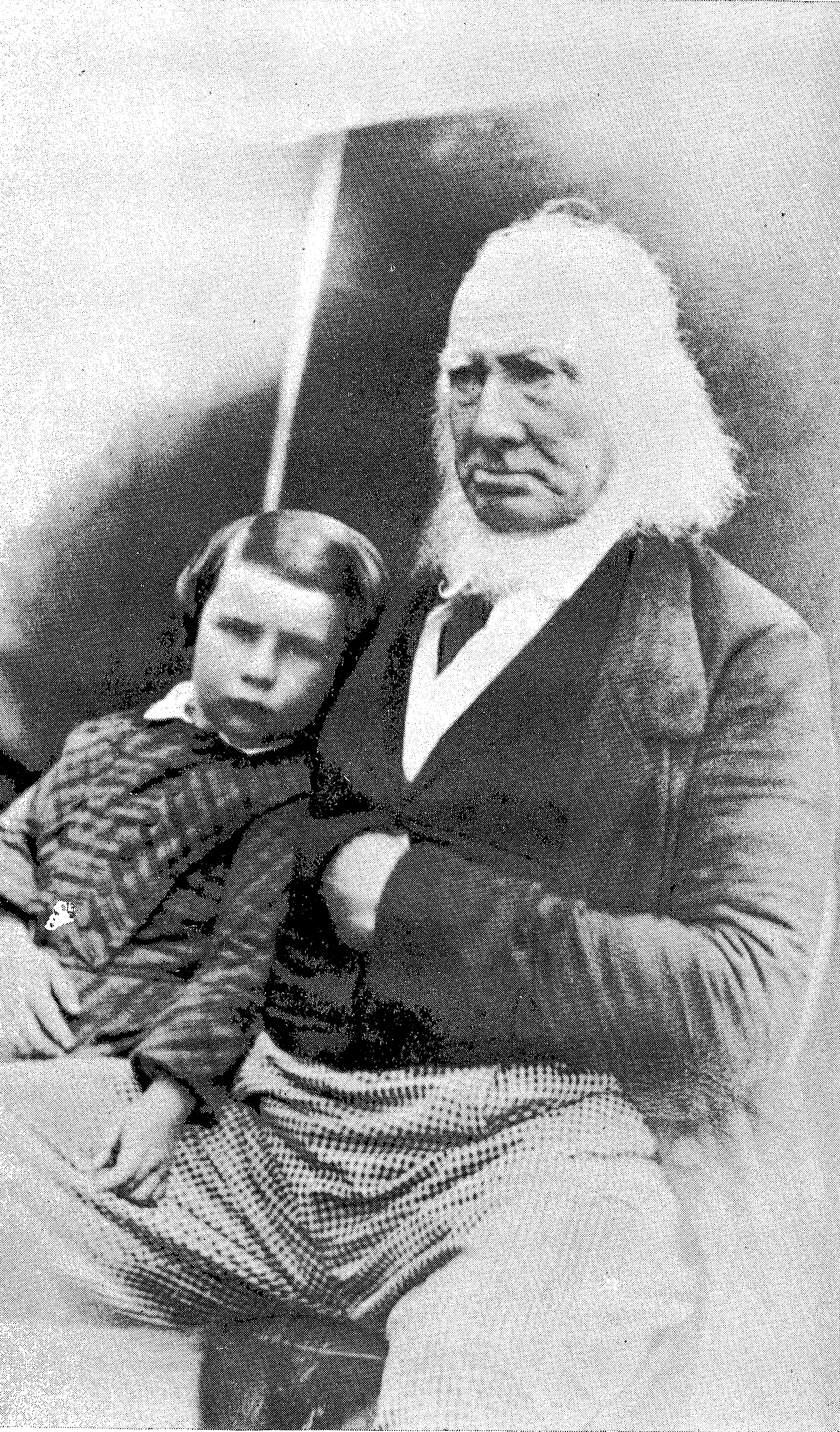
- Drummond with one of his grandchildren
- Born: 1786 or 1787; Inverarity, Scotland
- Died: 26 March 1863 (aged approximately 76); Toodyay, Australia

James Drummond (late 1786 or early 1787 – 26 March 1863) was an Australian botanist and naturalist who was an early settler in Western Australia.

== Early life ==
James Drummond was born in Inverarity, near Forfar, Angus, Scotland, the eldest son of Thomas Drummond, a gardener and botanist. His younger brother Thomas Drummond (1793–1835) was also a botanist. The latter emigrated to Cuba and died there. Both brothers originally worked with their father on the Fothringham estate in Inverarity.

He was baptised on 8 January 1787. His father, Thomas Drummond, was a gardener at Fotheringham estate. Little is known of his early life, but he certainly followed the usual course of apprenticeship leading to his "qualification" as a gardener. In 1808, he was employed by Mr Dickson (most probably George Dickson of Leith Walk, Edinburgh). In the mid-1808, Drummond (aged 21) he was appointed curator of the botanic garden that was being established by the Cork Institution, in the city of Cork, Ireland. At the time this was a government funded garden, one purpose of which was the testing and propagation of plants for the benefit of the farmers of southern Ireland. In addition to his horticultural duties, Drummond discovered several species of plant that were previously not known to occur in Ireland. In 1810 Drummond was elected an Associate of the Linnean Society of London. That year he married Sarah Mackintosh, with whom he would have six children.

== Swan River Colony ==
In 1828, in the midst of an economic recession, the British government withdrew funding for the botanical garden, and Drummond found himself unemployed with six children to support. Shortly afterwards, he was offered an appointment as Government Naturalist to the soon-to-be-established Swan River Colony (Australia). This position was honorary, but Drummond was given to understand that if it was decided to establish a public garden in the colony, he could expect to be given a salaried appointment as Superintendent of Government Gardens.

Drummond and his family sailed for the Swan River with the colony's other government officials on board the Parmelia. On arriving, a temporary settlement was established at Garden Island. Informed that the settlement was unlikely to move to the mainland for a few months, Drummond established a garden on Garden Island. This garden was planted with stock donated by the Horticultural Society in London and Drummond's own private stock of plants and seeds.

Under the colony's land grant conditions, Drummond's investment in the colony was valued at £375, and this figure entitled him to 5,000 acres (2,000 ha) of land. His first grant was 100 acres (40 ha) of rich alluvial soil at Guildford, where the Helena and Swan Rivers meet. He took possession of this land on 16 November 1829, and set about establishing a public nursery, probably with a view to encouraging his appointment to the salaried position of Superintendent of Government Gardens. However, when Drummond sought permission of the Governor, Captain James Stirling, to transfer some of his plants from Garden Island, he was refused permission and told that the storekeeper, John Morgan, had been given control of the Garden Island nursery. Drummond then abandoned the Guildford site.

Around this time Drummond was given permission to select 1,000 acres (400 ha) of his grant on the Swan River. He chose a site in the present-day Perth suburb of Ascot, consisting of extensive river frontage and low-lying flats prone to flooding. Later he claimed a grant in the Avon Valley south of Beverley, but then changed his mind and exchanged it for land in the Helena Valley, probably near the present-day site of Mundaring Weir.

In July 1831, Stirling decided to establish a Government Garden and nursery adjacent to the temporary Government House. He appointed Drummond to the position of Superintendent with a salary of £100 per year, and allowed him to live in a small house next to the site. The following year, however, Stirling received instructions from the Colonial Office that the position of Government Naturalist should be abolished. Stirling agreed to press for the decision to be overturned, and in the meantime invited Drummond to take over the Government Gardens for his own profit. Stirling returned to England later that year to hold discussions with the Colonial Office in person. On his return in June 1834, Drummond was informed that the Colonial Office had insisted that Drummond's post be abolished. On top of his retrenchment, Drummond was instructed to vacate his house next to the Government Gardens, as Stirling had decided to build the permanent Government House on the site. The situation degenerated into a quarrel, and Drummond tendered his resignation. He then retired from Perth to his grant in the Helena Valley, where he established a nursery and vineyard.

== Collecting for Mangles ==
In July 1835, James Mangles wrote to George Fletcher Moore to ask him to help Mangles obtain seeds and plants of Western Australian flora. Moore responded by purchasing a hundred packets of different kinds of seeds from Drummond's son Johnston, who had developed a taste for botanical collecting from his father. Moore sent the seeds to Mangles, and later that year Mangles sent Moore two cases of rare and useful plants, asking Moore to return the cases filled with Western Australian plants. As Moore doubted his ability to rear the plants given to him, and did not have time to collect plants to return to Mangles, he passed both tasks on to James Drummond, writing to Mangles to introduce Drummond and recommend him as a botanist and collector. Aware of Drummond's financial difficulties, he agreed to bear the cost of sending the boxes to Mangles.

In September 1835, Drummond sent a letter to Mangles, in which he included the seeds of a number of species that he had collected when exploring the Helena Valley. He also enclosed three samples of soil from different parts of his grant, and asked Mangles to arrange a scientific analysis of them. He also asked Mangles to help him get orders for seeds and specimens.

The first box of specimens sent by Drummond contained orchid tubers, although Drummond doubted they would survive the trip. None of them survived, and all of the seeds were destroyed by insect larvae. Mangles responded with a request for more specimens, and sent Drummond a hortus siccus for Drummond to mount pressed plants in. He agreed to take orders and dispose of seeds and specimens on Drummond's behalf, and enclosed an order from the English botanist John Lindley. However he also sent a frank letter to his cousin, Stirling's wife Ellen, in which he must have expressed frustration with Drummond, as Ellen Stirling responded with the observation that his letter was "a very long one but abusing poor old Drummond occupied so large a portion of it that [there was] no room for any other subject". By the same ship, Mangles sent a box of plants addressed to Ellen Stirling, but these were claimed by Drummond. Ellen Stirling disputed the matter, and the two had an angry argument that concluded with Drummond taking half. Ellen Stirling later wrote to Mangles, saying that Drummond was getting "old and stupid and appears only desirous to promote his own views".

The ship that carried Mangles' letters and plants to Western Australia arrived in September 1837, and Drummond sent another box of orchid tubers and some dried, pressed plants with it on its return to England. The orchid tubers were again destroyed, but the pressed plants arrived intact. Mangles lent them to John Lindley, who described a number of new species from them, thus establishing Drummond's reputation as a botanical collector.

Drummond continued to collect for Mangles, putting together a large collection of living plants for him. He also made a number of collections of pressed plants and seeds for Mangles to sell on Drummond's behalf, of which one was to be given to Mangles. He dispatched these collection on the Joshua Carroll in September 1838. Meanwhile, Mangles had tired of Drummond's "commercial attitude towards botany" (Hasluck, 1955), and had begun to receive the outstanding collections of Georgiana Molloy. Shortly after the Joshua Carroll sailed, Drummond received a letter from Mangles in which Mangles declined to dispose of his specimens. On receiving Drummond's collections, Mangles passed them on to Lindley, who had offered to dispose of them for Drummond. The collections were divided into sets and sold by George Bentham, but it was many years before Drummond eventually received payment.

== Farming at Toodyay ==
In 1836, Drummond exchanged his grant on the Helena Valley for land in the Avon Valley. Settling at Toodyay, the Drummonds established a homestead which they named Hawthornden after Drummond's ancestral seat. By February 1838, the homestead was sufficiently established for Drummond's wife and daughter to join them. Initially Drummond worked hard to establish his farm, but later this was increasingly taken over by his sons Thomas and James.

== Collecting for Hooker ==
Although no longer having any financial encouragement to collect, Drummond continued to collect botanical specimens. In 1839 he received a letter from Sir William Jackson Hooker of Kew Gardens, who requested seeds and plants, and offered to dispose of collections on Drummond's behalf. He also invited Drummond to submit written accounts of the botany of the Swan River Colony, which Jackson would publish in his Journal of Botany. A number of Drummond's letters to Hooker were published, and it is these accounts for which Drummond was best known at the time.

Over the next fourteen years, Drummond made numerous collecting expeditions. In August 1839, he made an expedition to Rottnest Island in company with John Gilbert and Ludwig Preiss, and made two journeys into the Guangan that year. In 1840 he undertook an expedition to King George Sound, helping to identify a poisonous plant as the cause of many stock deaths in the area. In 1841 he went in search of good squatting land to the east of their land in Toodyay. The expedition, which included Captain John Scully, Samuel Pole Phillips and Johnston Drummond, discovered the vast tract of open pastoral land that is now known as the Victoria Plains. Following this expedition, Drummond put together what is now known as Drummond's 1st Collection.

Drummond made four expeditions in 1842. The first was to the Busselton district; the second into unexplored territory around the present-day site of the town of Moora; the third into the Wongan Hills with Gilbert and Johnston Drummond; and the fourth in the south west corner of the colony with Gilbert. In addition to collecting plants, Drummond also made large collections of moss and fungi during 1842 and 1843. The collection that Drummond prepared and dispatched in 1843 became known as Drummond's 2nd Collection.

During late 1843 and 1844, Drummond made a number of journeys with his son Johnston, who was rapidly becoming a highly respected botanical and zoological collector in his own right. Near the end of 1843, the pair made an expedition to the north and east of Bolgart. Shortly afterwards they started on a major expedition to King George Sound, and east as far as Cape Riche. The plants that he collected in this expedition formed what became known as Drummond's 3rd Collection.

In 1844, a severe recession placed the Drummond family in severe financial debt, and the family farm was lost. Drummond and his son Johnston began planning to make their entire living from collecting, discussing going to South Australia or India, but nothing came of it before Johnston Drummond's death in July 1845. In 1845 and 1846, financial difficulties prevented Drummond from undertaking any further expeditions, but late in 1846 he was informed that he had been granted an honorarium of £200 by the British Government for services rendered to botany. He immediately began preparations for another journey. Setting out in company with George Maxwell, he travelled south to the Porongorup and Stirling Ranges, extensively exploring both, then south to King George Sound and east along the coast for five days. The result was Drummond's 4th Collection, which was complete by July 1847.

He made yet another expedition in 1848, along the south coast to the Mount Barren. He had intended to go further, but the Mount Barren ranges were so rich in new species that there was no need. Drummond's 5th Collection was dispatched to London in June 1849. When Hooker received it he wrote in his Journal that he had "rarely seen so great a number of fine and remarkable species arrive at one time from any country".

In 1850, Drummond joined a surveying expedition that sought to establish a route for overlanding stock to Champion Bay. He spent 1851 in Champion Bay with his son John. He returned to Toodyay in December, and over the next few months he wrote a series of articles on the "Botany of the Northwestern District of Western Australia", which were published in five issues of the Perth Gazette from April 1852, and later republished by Hooker. His 6th Collection, made in Champion Bay the previous year, was put together and shipped near the end of 1852.

== Later life ==
Thereafter Drummond ceased all collecting. He retired to Hawthornden, where he tended his grape vines and garden, and maintained an occasional correspondence with Hooker and other botanists. He remained in quiet retirement for ten years. He died on 26 March 1863 and was buried at Hawthornden beside his son Johnston. His wife died a little over a year later, and was buried beside him.

James Drummond Jr. transferred his father's extensive collections to Ferdinand von Mueller, then Government Botanist of Victoria, where it became the basis of Victoria's State Herbarium, today known as the National Herbarium of Victoria (MEL), Royal Botanic Gardens Victoria. . Specimens collected by Drummond are held in twenty-five herbaria in Britain, Europe, the US and Australia.

== Legacy ==
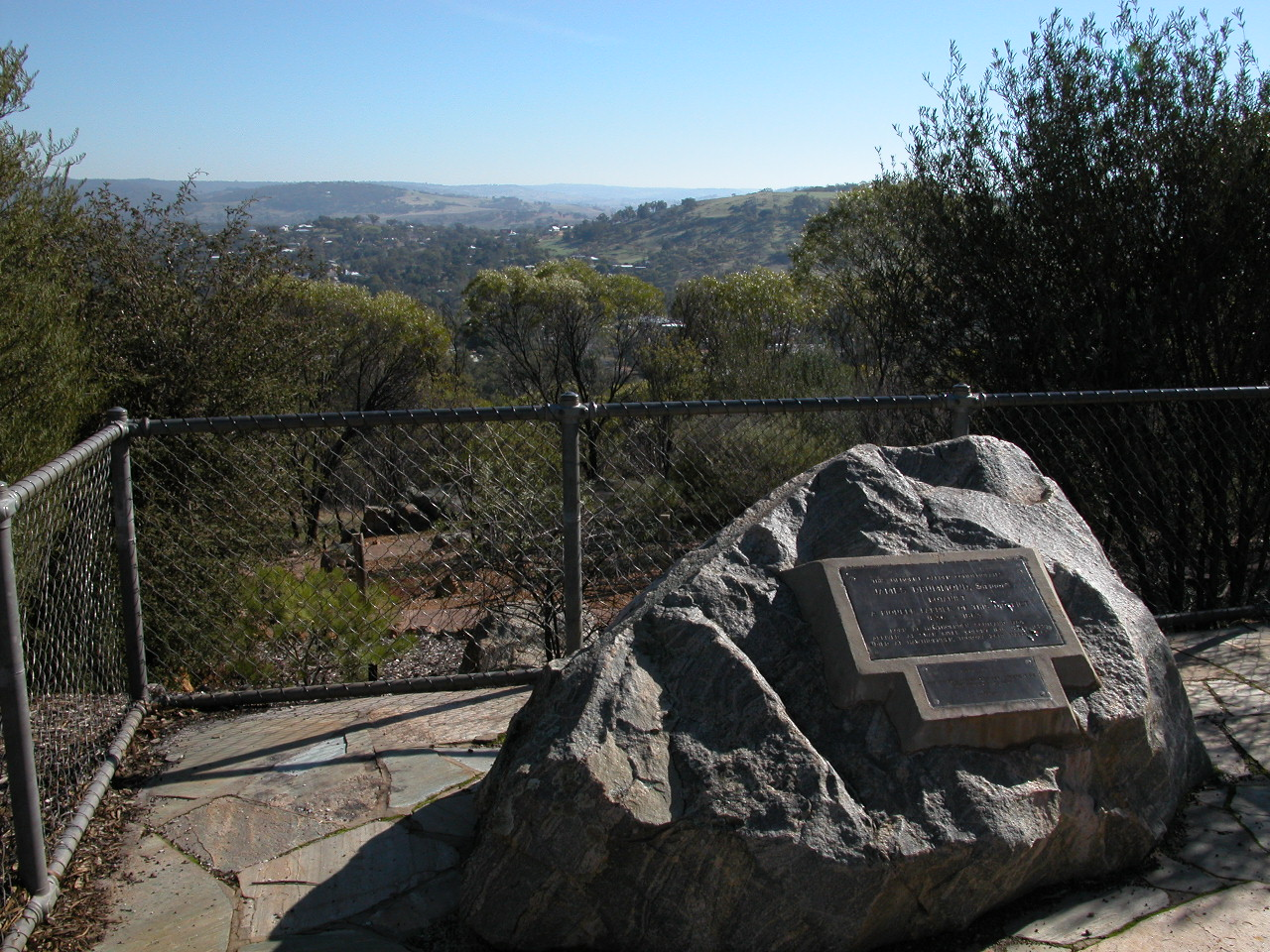
Memorial to James Drummond in Pelham Reserve, overlooking Toodyay, Western Australia

James Drummond was the author of several species of plant:

- Boronia molloyae Tall Boronia
- Dasypogon hookeri, J.Drumm., 1843 Pineapple bush
- Drakaea livida, J.Drumm., 1842
- Diuris picta, J.Drumm., 1853
- Dricrastylis reticulata, J.Drumm. ex Harv., 1855
- Dicrastylis stoechas, J.Drumm. ex Harv., 1855
- Gastrolobium leakeanum
- Hakea victoria, Royal Hakea
- Macropidia fumosa, J. Drumm. ex Harv., 1855
- Verticordia grandis, Scarlet Featherflower

and, at least, one genus Lepilaena, J. Drumm. ex Harv., 1855

Over one hundred plant species were named in his honour, around sixty of which are still valid. Hall (1978) quotes Joseph Maiden as writing "He was far and away the most successful collector of Western Australian plants of his time." This botanist is denoted by the author abbreviation J.Drumm. when citing a botanical name.

Mount Drummond was named in Drummond's honour by John Septimus Roe in 1848. Roe, who was exploring the Mount Barren area is search of pastoral land at the same time that Drummond was collecting there, gave the hill its name after finding fresh tracks of Drummond there. In 1993 the Mundaring district office of the Department of Conservation and Land Management purchased 493 hectares (1,220 acres) of land 10 kilometres (6.2 mi) west of Bolgart it was named the Drummond Nature Reserve in his honour.

In 1948 a memorial in honour of John Gilbert and James Drummond was erected in bush near Drakewood by ornithological and historical societies. A memorial seat in Kings Park and Botanic Garden commemorates his life and work.

James Drummond's brother Thomas Drummond, also a naturalist, accompanied Sir John Franklin in his explorations into the Northwest Territories of Canada in 1819–1822. Thomas died in Havana in Cuba in 1835. Of his sons, Johnston became a respected botanical collector in his own right; James became a Member of the Western Australian Legislative Council, and John became the colony's first Inspector of Native Police. His youngest daughter Euphemia was famed in her lifetime as the last surviving settler to arrive on the Parmelia from 1905 until her death in 1920. Thomas' grandson (James' great nephew) was the botanist James Montagu Frank Drummond FRSE.

== Other sources ==
- "James Drummond". Bright Sparcs.
- Erickson, Rica (1969). The Drummonds of Hawthornden. Osborne Park, Western Australia: Lamb Paterson.
- Hall, Norman (1978). Botanists of the Eucalypts. Australia: Commonwealth Scientific and Industrial Research Organisation. ISBN 0-643-00271-5.
- Hasluck, Alexandra (1955). Portrait with Background: A Life of Georgiana Molloy. Melbourne: Oxford University Press.
- Serle, Percival (1949). "Drummond, James". Dictionary of Australian Biography. Sydney: Angus & Robertson.
- Nelson, E. Charles (1990). "James and Thomas Drummond: their Scottish origins and curatorships in Irish botanic gardens (ca 1808 – ca 1831)". Archives of Natural History. 17 (1): 49–65. doi:10.3366/anh.1990.0002.
