= Leucopogon opponens =

Scientific classification
- Kingdom: Plantae
- Clade: Tracheophytes
- Clade: Angiosperms
- Clade: Eudicots
- Clade: Asterids
- Order: Ericales
- Family: Ericaceae
- Genus: Leucopogon
- Species: L. opponens

Binomial name
- Leucopogon opponens (F.Muell.) Benth.
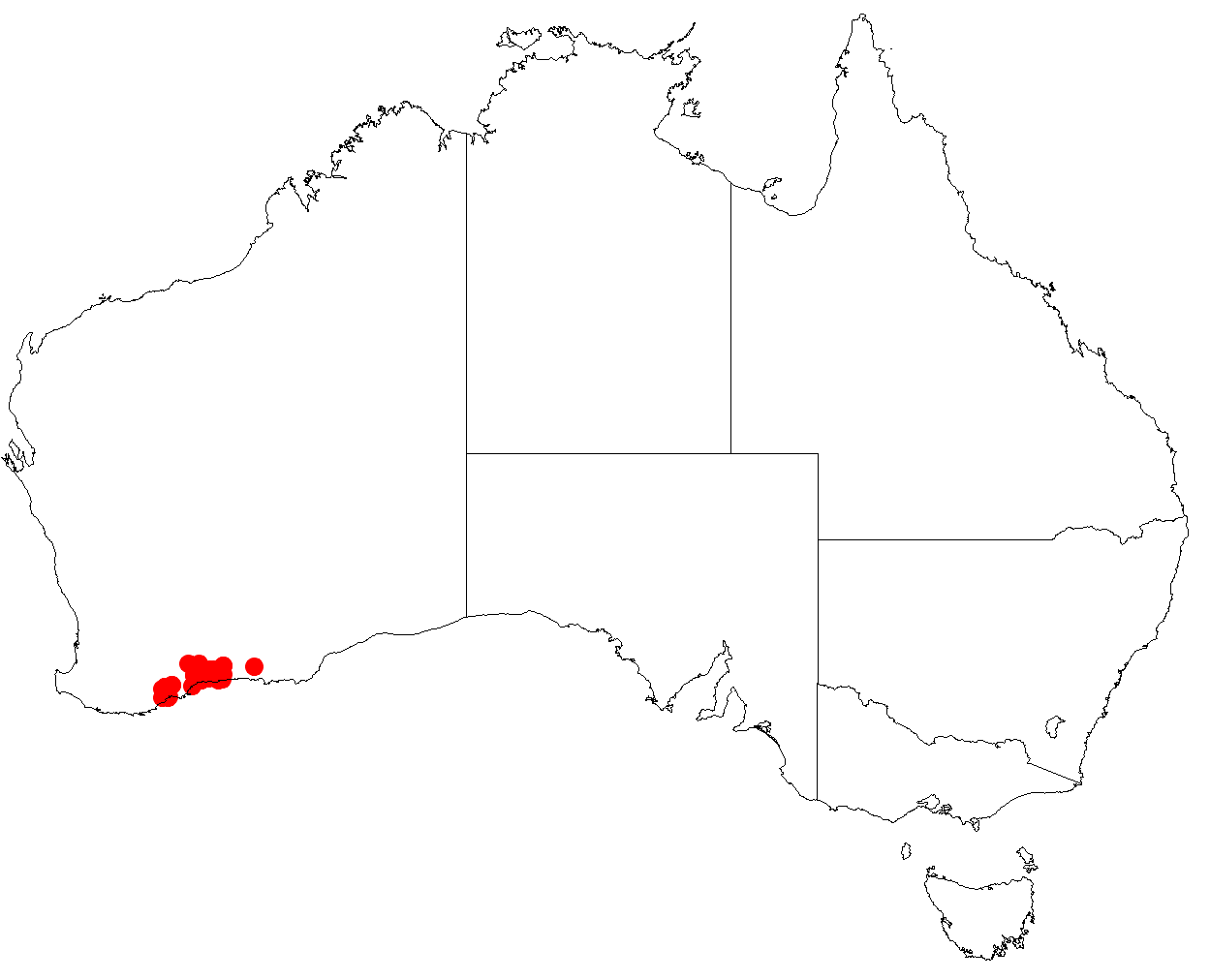
- Occurrence data from AVH

Synonyms
- Styphelia opponens F.Muell.

Species of shrub

Leucopogon opponens is a species of flowering plant in the heath family Ericaceae and is endemic to the south-west of Western Australia. It is an erect, slender shrub with its leaves arranged in opposite pairs, and white, tube-shaped flowers.

== Description ==
Leucopogon opponens is an erect, slender shrub that typically grows to a height of 30–70 cm (12–28 in) and has thin, arching branches. Its leaves are arranged in opposite pairs, 4.0–6.3 mm (0.16–0.25 in) long on a distinct petiole, the edges of the leaves rolled under, and the lower surface with 2 longitudinal furrows. The flowers are arranged on the ends of branches or in leaf axils in short, dense spikes. The bracts are concave and shorter than the bracteoles that are about half as long as the sepals. The sepals are 2.6–3.2 mm (0.10–0.13 in) long and the petals less than 4.2 mm (0.17 in) long, the lobes slightly longer than the petal tube. Flowering mainly occurs from July to October.

== Taxonomy ==
This species was first formally described in 1867 by Ferdinand von Mueller who gave it the name Styphelia opponens in Fragmenta Phytographiae Australiae from specimens collected near the Phillips River by George Maxwell. In 1868, George Bentham transferred the species to Leucopogon as L. opponens in Flora Australiensis. The specific epithet (opponens) means "opposing", referring to the arrangement of the leaves.

== Distribution and habitat ==
Leucopogon opponens grows in sand and loamy clay on sandplains in the Esperance Plains and Mallee bioregions of south-western Western Australia, and is listed as "not threatened" by the Government of Western Australia Department of Biodiversity, Conservation and Attractions.
