= List of shipwrecks in September 1829 =

The list of shipwrecks in September 1829 includes some ships sunk, wrecked or otherwise lost during September 1829.

== 1 September ==
List of shipwrecks: 1 September 1829
Ship	State	Description
Lara	United Kingdom	The ship was driven ashore and wrecked at Dungeness, Kent. She was on a voyage from London to Malta and Corfu, Greece.

== 4 September ==
List of shipwrecks: 4 September 1829
Ship	State	Description
Marquis of Anglesea	United Kingdom	A gale drove the vessel ashore, wrecking her. Her passengers and cargo had already been landed.

== 5 September ==
List of shipwrecks: 5 September 1829
Ship	State	Description
Unicorn	United Kingdom	The ship was driven ashore on Isle Madame, Nova Scotia, British North America. She was on a voyage from Quebec City, Lower Canada, British North America to Liverpool, Lancashire.
William and Esther	United Kingdom	The sloop was in collision with the brig Bilboa (United Kingdom) off Whitby. Yorkshire and foundered. Her crew were rescued by Bilboa.

== 7 September ==
List of shipwrecks: 7 September 1829
Ship	State	Description
Hope	United Kingdom	The ship foundered off Fogo, Newfoundland, British North America with the loss of all hands. She was on a voyage from Poole, Dorset to Fogo.

== 8 September ==
List of shipwrecks: 8 September 1829
Ship	State	Description
Blossom	United States	The ship was abandoned in the Atlantic Ocean. Her crew were rescued by Victory (United Kingdom). She was on a voyage from Stockholm, Sweden to New York.

== 9 September ==
List of shipwrecks: 9 September 1829
Ship	State	Description
Barbara	United Kingdom	The sloop was in collision with a galiot at South Shields, County Durham and was consequently beached.

== 10 September ==
List of shipwrecks: 10 September 1829
Ship	State	Description
Atlas	United Kingdom	The ship was wrecked 2 nautical miles (3.7 km) east of Padstow, Cornwall. Her crew were rescued.
Caroline	United States	The brig foundered in a hurricane at Pueblo Viejo de Tampico, Mexico.
Ceres	United Kingdom	The ship was driven ashore at Northam, Devon. Her crew were rescued.
Daniel	United Kingdom	The ship foundered at Bideford, Devon. Her crew and passengers were rescued by the Bideford Lifeboat.
Friends	United Kingdom	The ship ran aground at St. Ives, Cornwall. Her crew were rescued. She was on a voyage from Porlock, Somerset to Penzance, Cornwall.
Friends	United Kingdom	The ship capsized and sank at Padstow with the loss of all hands.
Hector	United Kingdom	The ship was driven ashore at Pentino Cove, Padstow.
USS Hornet	United States Navy	The Sloop sank in a Hurricane after leaving Tampico, Mexico.
Mary	United Kingdom	The ship was wrecked near Padstow. Her crew were rescued. Mary was refloated on 12 September and found to be leaking severely.
Minerva	(United Kingdom of Great Britain and Ireland) New South Wales	The whaler was wrecked on a reef in the Pacific Ocean (24°S 17°W) off Tonga.
Sprightly	United Kingdom	The ship was driven ashore and wrecked in Widemouth Bay. Her crew were rescued.

== 13 September ==
List of shipwrecks: 13 September 1829
Ship	State	Description
Shepherd	United Kingdom	The ship was wrecked on Götaland, Sweden. She was on a voyage from Saint Petersburg, Russia to Londonderry.

== 14 September ==
List of shipwrecks: 14 September 1829
Ship	State	Description
Anna Catherina	Netherlands	The ship foundered in the Vlie.
Fortuna	United Kingdom	The ship foundered in the Vlie.
Twende Brodre	Netherlands	The ship was lost near "Waringen". Her crew were rescued. She was on a voyage from Amsterdam, North Holland to St. Ubes, Spain.

== 16 September ==
List of shipwrecks: 16 September 1829
Ship	State	Description
Ceylon	United Kingdom	The ship foundered in the North Sea off Heligoland. Her crew were rescued. She was on a voyage from Hamburg to St. Ubes, Spain.
Frances	United Kingdom	The ship was wrecked on Maio, Cape Verde Islands. Her crew were rescued. She was on a voyage from the Cape of Good Hope to Bristol, Gloucestershire.

== 19 September ==
List of shipwrecks: 19 September 1829
Ship	State	Description
Magan	France	The ship was wrecked in the Gironde River. Her crew were rescued. She was on a voyage from Adra, Spain to Bordeaux, Gironde.
Minerve	France	The ship was wrecked in the Gironde River. She was on a voyage from Newfoundland, British North America to Bordeaux.

== 20 September ==
List of shipwrecks: 20 September 1829
Ship	State	Description
Ceres	United Kingdom	The ship was beached crewless at Walberswick, Suffolk.

== 21 September ==
List of shipwrecks: 21 September 1829
Ship	State	Description
Helen	United Kingdom	The brig was wrecked on the North Rock, in the North Sea off the coast of Aberdeenshire.

== 22 September ==
List of shipwrecks: 22 September 1829
Ship	State	Description
Ailsa Craig	United Kingdom	The paddle steamer was driven ashore and severely damaged. She was later repaired, enlarged, and returned to service.
James Watt	United Kingdom	The paddle steamer was driven ashore. She was refloated the next day.

== 23 September ==
List of shipwrecks: 23 September 1829
Ship	State	Description
Adriatic	United Kingdom	The ship foundered in the Baltic Sea north of Hogland. She was on a voyage from Hamburg to Saint Petersburgh, Russia.

== 24 September ==
List of shipwrecks: 24 September 1829
Ship	State	Description
Ann	United Kingdom	The ship was abandoned in the Saint Lawrence River, British North America.
Dolphin	United Kingdom	The whaler was lost in the Davis Strait.

== 27 September ==
List of shipwrecks: 27 September 1829
Ship	State	Description
Elizabeth	United Kingdom	The ship was driven ashore and wrecked at Liverpool, Lancashire. She was on a voyage from Saint Domingue to Liverpool.

== 28 September ==
List of shipwrecks: 28 September 1829
Ship	State	Description
Fraser	United Kingdom	The steamship was wrecked at South Head, Aberdeenshire. Her crew were rescued by rocket apparatus. She was on a voyage from Newcastle upon Tyne, Northumberland to Liverpool, Lancashire.

== 29 September ==
List of shipwrecks: 29 September 1829
Ship	State	Description
USS Hornet	United States Navy	USS Hornet. The sloop-of-war, or brig, foundered in a gale off Tampico, Mexico with the loss of all 145 hands.

== 30 September ==
List of shipwrecks: 30 September 1829
Ship	State	Description
Ada	United Kingdom	The ship was driven ashore and wrecked at Cape Trafalgar, Spain. She was on a voyage from Bristol, Gloucestershire to Livorno, Grand Duchy of Tuscany.

== Unknown date ==
List of shipwrecks: Unknown date in September 1829
Ship	State	Description
Enterprize	United Kingdom	The ship was driven ashore at Filey, Yorkshire.
Fame	United Kingdom	The ship was driven ashore and wrecked in the River Quelle, Lower Canada, British North America.
George	(United Kingdom of Great Britain and Ireland) Isle of Man	The ship was driven ashore and severely damaged at Islandmagee, County Antrim in early September.
Liberty	United Kingdom	The ship foundered in early September whilst on a voyage from Baltimore, County Cork to Castlehaven, County Cork. Her crew were rescued.
Resolution	United Kingdom	The ship was wrecked in Chaleur Bay before 29 September.
