= Seaview Cottage, Drummond Cove =

Building in Drummond Cove, Western Australia

Coordinates: 28.67045°S 114.62°E

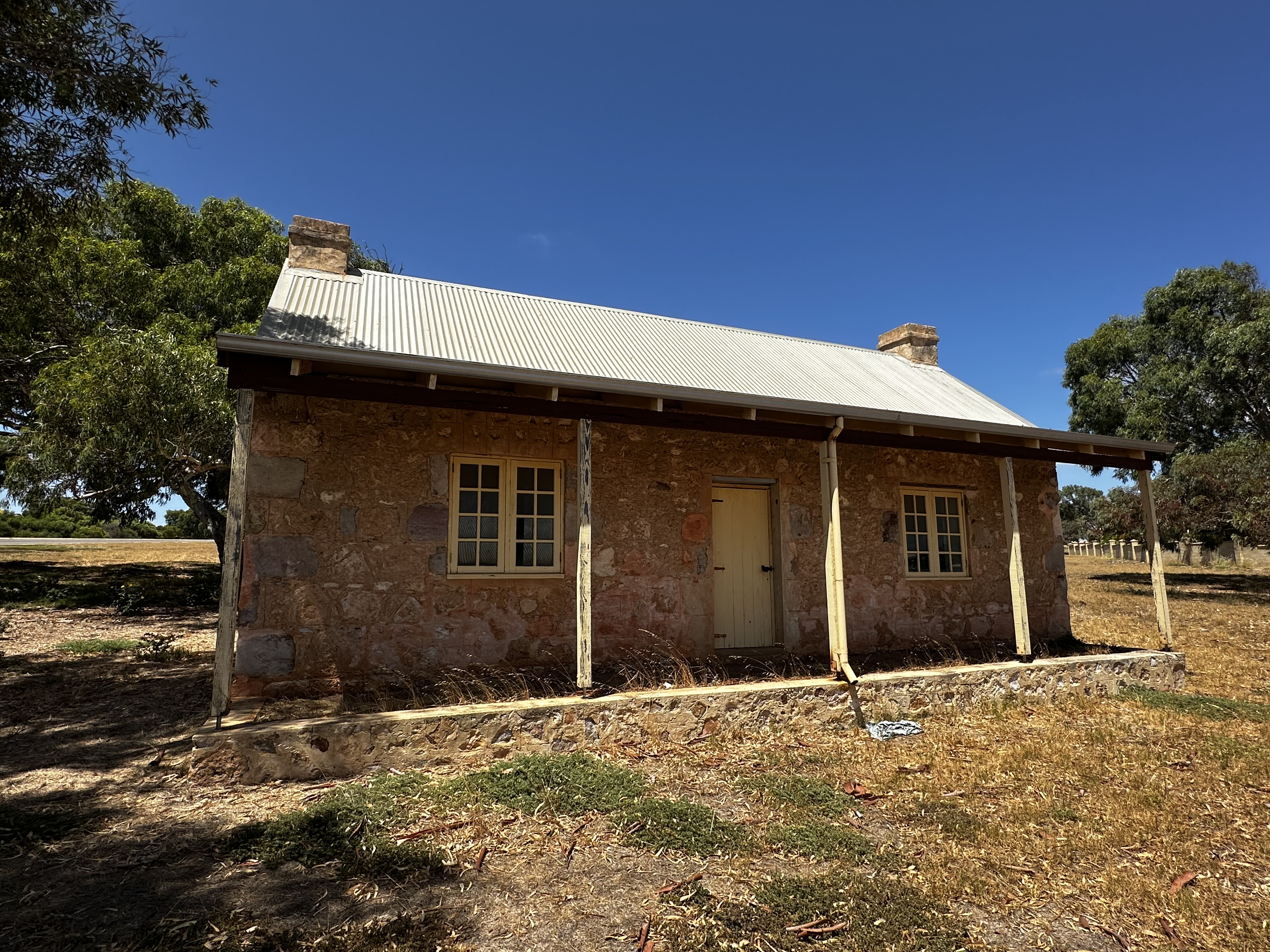
Mary Drummond's Cottage

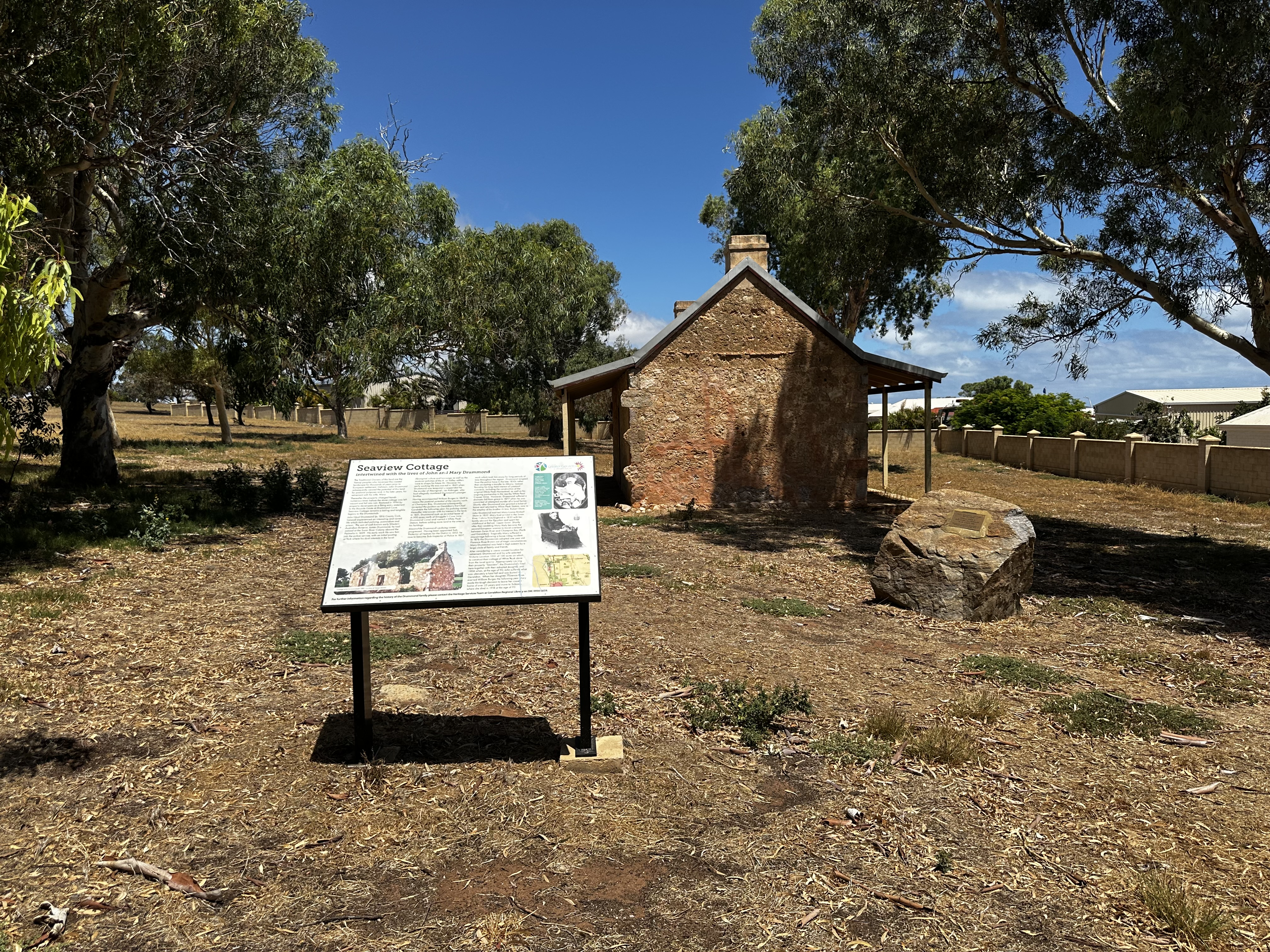
Mary Drummond's Cottage

Seaview Cottage, also known as Mary Drummond's Cottage and Captain Drummond’s Cottage, is a building situated on Bayside Boulevard at the entrance to the Bayside Estate in Drummond Cove approximately 14 kilometres (9 mi) north of Geraldton in the Mid West region of Western Australia.

Seaview Cottage was built by John Nicol Drummond, a pioneer pastoralist, in 1870. The cottage, called Sea View, became his residence after he retired.

Some time after John Drummond was imprisoned for the unlawful wounding of tenant farmer John Fisher, Mary Drummond moved from White Peak Station to Seaview with her adopted daughter Rosie. Subsequently, John also lived at the cottage until his death in 1906 at the age of 90. Some time after John's death Mary moved to Subiaco.
