= Styphelia exserta =

Scientific classification
- Kingdom: Plantae
- Clade: Tracheophytes
- Clade: Angiosperms
- Clade: Eudicots
- Clade: Asterids
- Order: Ericales
- Family: Ericaceae
- Genus: Styphelia
- Species: S. exserta

Binomial name
- Styphelia exserta (F.Muell.) Sleumer

Synonyms
- Leucopogon exsertus F.Muell.; Soleniscia pulchella Stschegl.; Styphelia pulchella (Stschegl.) Druce

Species of plant

Styphelia exserta is a species of flowering plant in the heath family Ericaceae and is endemic to the south-west of Western Australia. It is an erect shrub with broadly egg-shaped leaves, and white, tube-shaped flowers.

== Description ==
Styphelia exserta is an erect shrub that typically grows to a height of 30–90 cm (12–35 in) and has slender branchlets. Its leaves are broadly egg-shaped, less than 4 mm (0.16 in) long, tapering to a very short petiole, the leaves concave and down-turned at the end. The flowers are arranged on a short pedicel with very small bracts and bracteoles less than 0.5 mm (0.020 in) long at the base. The sepals are slightly more than 2 mm (0.079 in) long, the petals white and joined at the base to form a tube 4 mm (0.16 in) long, with lobes about the same length as the petal tube, turned back and bearded inside.

== Taxonomy ==
This species was first formally described in 1863 by Ferdinand von Mueller who gave it the name Leucopogon exsertus in his Fragmenta Phytographiae Australiae from specimens collected near the Phillips River by George Maxwell. In 1964, Hermann Otto Sleumer transferred the species to Styphelia as S. exserta in the journal Blumea. The specific epithet (exserta) means "protruding", referring to the stamens.

== Distribution and habitat ==
Styphelia exserta grows on limestone in the Coolgardie, Esperance Plains, Hampton and Mallee bioregions of south-western Western Australia.

== Conservation status ==
Styphelia exserta is listed as "not threatened" by the Government of Western Australia Department of Biodiversity, Conservation and Attractions.
