= Prince Regent (1811 Shields ship) =

UK merchant ship (1811–-1855)

History

United Kingdom
- Name: Prince Regent
- Namesake: George IV, who became Prince Regent in 1811
- Builder: William Temple, Jarrow
- Launched: 30 November 1811
- Fate: Last listed 1855

General characteristics
- Tons burthen: 1811: 527, or 52758/94 (bm); Revised measure post 1836: 512 (bm)
- Length: 117 ft 1 in (35.7 m)
- Beam: 32 ft 4 in (9.9 m)
- Armament: 10 × 18-pounder carronades

Prince Regent was launched at Shields in 1811. During her relatively long career she made four voyages transporting convicts to Australia, three voyages to New South Wales and one to Van Diemen's Land (Tasmania). After the first, rather than immediately returning to England, she engaged in whaling. Prince Regent spent many years as a transport, carrying troops for the British government. She was last listed in 1855.

== Career ==
Prince Regent first appeared in Lloyd's Register in 1812.

| Year | Master | Owner | Trade | Source |
|---|---|---|---|---|
| 1812 | | Temple | London | LR |
| 1813 | R.Cairns | Bell & Co. | London transport | RS |
| 1816 | R.Cairns; J.White | Bell & Co. | London transport London–Boston | RS |
| 1816 | Kell; J.White | Bell & Co. Wilkinson | London–Baltimore | LR |
| 1818 | J.White | Wilkinson | Plymouth–Holland | LR |
| 1819 | J.White | Wilkinson | Plymouth–Holland; London−New South Wales | LR |

In 1813 the British East India Company (EIC) had lost its monopoly on the trade between India and Britain. British ships were then free to sail to India or the Indian Ocean under a licence from the EIC. Prince Regent's owners applied for a licence to sail to certain ports in the East Indies under the provisions for whalers. They applied on 3 October 1815 and received the licence on 8 October.

Between 1819 and 1822 Price Regent transported convicts to New South Wales. Once she had delivered them, she next made a whaling voyage in the British southern whale fishery.

1st convict voyage (1819–1820): Prince Regent, Captain William Anderson, departed Deal on 11 October 1819 and arrived at Port Jackson on 27 January 1820. She had embarked 160 male convicts and suffered no convict deaths on her voyage. An officer commanded 31 other ranks from the 48th Regiment of Foot, who provided the guard.

Whaling voyage (1820–1822): On 10 May Prince Regent sailed for Hobart to engage in whaling. She arrived at Hobart on 22 May. On 31 August she sailed for the sperm whale fishery. A news report on 17 March 1821 stated that Prince Regent had been in New Zealand waters and had gathered 1400 barrels. On 16 April she arrived back at Port Jackson. On 20 July the "Prince Regent (Whaler)", Anderson, master, was at Van Diemen's Land. She sailed again for the whale fishery; on 19 September 1821 she was off Sydney and Anderson came in by boat from his ship. He reported that she had been tolerably successful and then returned to Prince Regent. She returned to England on 6 June 1822 with 153 tons of sperm oil, 171 tons of (whale) oil, and fins.

| Year | Master | Owner | Trade | Source |
|---|---|---|---|---|
| 1822 | Weatherall | Jones | London−New South Wales | Register of Shipping |
| 1823 | White; Wales | Jones | London−New South Wales | LR |
| 1824 | Wales | J.Somes | London−New South Wales | LR |

Joseph Somes purchased Prince Regent in 1823.

2nd convict voyage (1824): Prince Regent, Wales, master, arrived at Gravesend, Kent on 3 January 1824 from Tenerife. Prince Regent, Captain Alexander Wales was at Deal on 7 January 1824. She sailed to Cork to embark convicts. She sailed from Cork on 13 February. She stopped at Rio de Janeiro and sailed from there on 26 April. She arrived at Port Jackson on 15 July. She had embarked 180 male convicts, two of whom died on the voyage. Two officers and 56 other ranks of the 40th Regiment of Foot provided the guard.

| Year | Master | Owner | Trade | Source & notes |
|---|---|---|---|---|
| 1826 | A.Wales; Richards | Somes & Co. | Cork–New South Wales | LR; new deck & good repair 1826 |
| 1827 | Richards | Somes & Co. | Cork–"MA" | LR; new deck & good repair 1826 |

On 26 June 1826, Prince Regent, Richards, master, sailed from Cork to Mauritius. She was carrying the 29th Regiment of Foot. She arrived there on 29 September. She sailed for England on 15 November, and from St Helena on 16 January 1827. She arrived in the Downs in mid-March.

3rd convict voyage (1827): Prince Regent, William Richards, master, sailed from London on 3 June 1827. She called at Tenerife on 2 July, and arrived at Port Jackson on 17 September. She had embarked 180 male convicts and she suffered no convict deaths on the voyage. One officer and 29 other ranks of the 29th Regiment of Foot provided the guard.

| Year | Master | Owner | Trade | Source & notes |
|---|---|---|---|---|
| 1828 | Richards | Somes & Co. | London transport | LR; new deck & good repair 1826 |
| 1829 | Richards | Somes & Co. | London transport | LR; new deck & new wales 1827, & damages repaired 1828 |
| 1830 | Richards; G.Hustwick | Somes & Co. | London–New South Wales | LR; new deck & new wales 1827, & damages repaired 1828 |

4th convict voyage (1829–1830): Captain George Hustwick sailed from Sheerness on 14 September 1829. Prince Regent arrived at Hobart on 10 January 1830. She had embarked 200 convicts and she suffered one convict death on her voyage. One convict may have been relanded before she sailed.

| Year | Master | Owner | Trade | Source & notes |
|---|---|---|---|---|
| 1831 | Hastwick; J.Marshall | Somes & Co. | Cowes | LR; new deck & new wales 1827, & damages repaired 1828 |
| 1832 | Marshall | Somes & Co. | Cork–Halifax | LR; new deck & new wales 1827, & damages repaired 1828 |
| 1834 | Marshall; Mollson | Somes & Co. | London transport | LR; large repair 1835 |
| 1837 | | Somes & Co. | London transport | LR; large repair 1835 |

In 1837 Prince Regent and Parmelia transported troops for the British government. On 19 January they carried the 82 Regiment of Foot from Dublin to Gibraltar. They then carried the 59th regiment of Foot from Gibraltar to Malta. On 14 March they carried the 5th Regiment of Foot from Malta to the Ionian Islands. Once they had completed the task, the British government hired the two vessels for £1,281 7s 9d to carry the remnants of the British Auxiliary Legion back from Spain to England. (Note: The British Auxiliary Legion, also called the British Legion (La Legión Británica) or Westminster Legion, existed from 1835 to 1837. It was a British military force sent to Spain to support the Liberals and Queen Isabella II of Spain against the Carlists in the First Carlist War.)

In mid-June 1837, Prince Regent embarked 520 troops on a vessel that would normally carry 280. She arrived at Greenock at the end of July. Parmelia carried some 200 to Portsmouth.

The Prince Regent is one of the best transports employed in the service, and yet she is a vessel wretchedly rigged, manned, and accommodated to her trade of carrying troops. Out of her whole crew, there were only two able-bodied seamen; the remained having been, as usual with transports, picked up at under wages. She had been up the Mediterranean with troops, and was on her passage home uncleansed, when she took up five hundred and twenty of the Legion. Some of our non-commissioned officers went on board, to distribute men to the berths as they arrived, and the filth and stench then was intolerable. Fleas and lice, bugs, and other vermin, nestled in every seam and splinter; not because the Legion was on board, but ready to devour the men of the Legion when they came on board! yet this was a British troop ship.

— Alexander Somerville, History of the British Legion...,

On 3 March 1838 Prince Regent carried some 600 men of the New British Auxiliary Legion from Spain to Cork and Greenock.

| Year | Master | Owner | Trade | Source & notes |
|---|---|---|---|---|
| 1839 | Atkins | J.Somes & Co. | London–Australia; London–Bermuda | LR; large repair 1835 |
| 1840 | Atkins | J.Somes & Co. | London–Bermuda; London transport | LR; large repair 1835 & damages repaired 1842 |
| 1842 | Simpson; W.Mordy | J.Somes & Co. J.G.Tyrie | London transport London–Cuba | LR; large repair 1835 & damages repaired 1842 |
| 1843 | W.Mordy | J.G.Tyrie | London–Cuba; Milford–Havana | LR; large repair 1835 & damages repaired 1842 & 1843 |
| 1844 | W.Mordy; Mainprize; Prizeman | J.G.Tyrie | Milford–Havana; Plymouth–West Indies | LR; large repair 1835 & damages repaired 1842, 1843, & 1844 |
| 1845 | Prizeman Crossman | J.G.Tyrie | Plymouth–West Indies; Plymouth–Quebec | LR; large repair 1835 & damages repaired 1842, 1843, & 1844 |
| 1848 | Crossman; W.Jago | J.G.Tyrie; Pope Bros. | Plymouth–Port Adelaide | LR; new deck & large repair 1848 |
| 1851 | W.Jago | Pope Bros. | London–New South Wales | LR; new deck & large repair 1848 |
| 1852 | W.Jago | Pope Bros. | | LR |
| 1853 | W.Jago | Pope Bros. | London–Port Phillip | LR; new deck & large repair 1847 |
| 1854 | W.Jago | Pope Bros. | | LR |

== Fate ==
Prince Regent was last listed in 1855 with data unchanged from 1854.
