= James Drummond (Australian politician) =

Australian politician

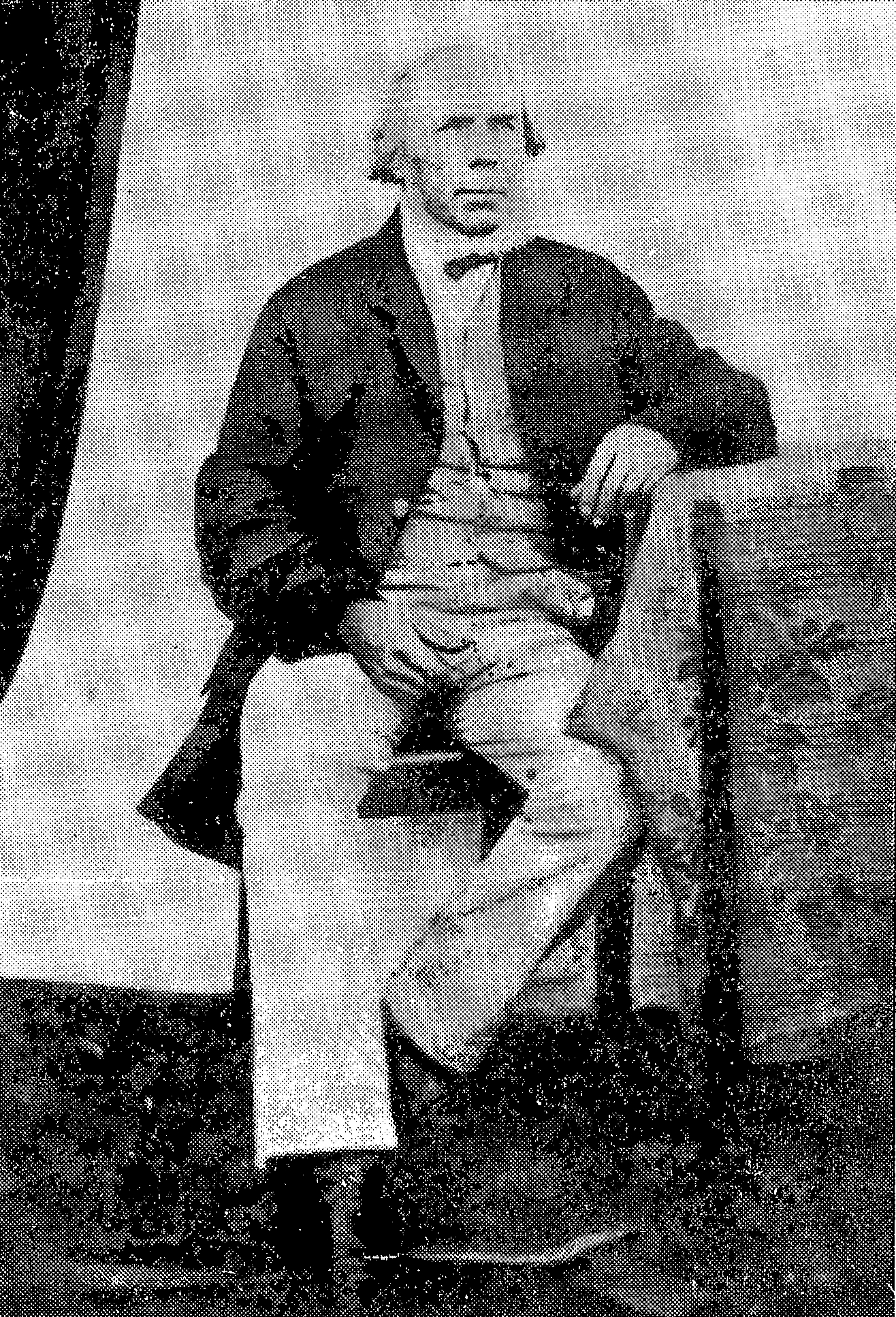
James Drummond

James Drummond (1814 – 8 February 1873) was an early settler in Western Australia, and a member of the Western Australian Legislative Council from 1870 to 1873.

Born in 1814, most probably in Cork, Ireland, James Drummond was the son of botanist James Drummond. Nothing is known of his early life, but in 1829 the family emigrated to the Swan River Colony in what is now Western Australia, arriving on board Parmelia on 1 June. For much of his early life James Drummond helped farm the family's land grants, first on the Swan River and after 1836 at their Hawthornden grant at Toodyay.

Shortly after relocating to Toodyay, Drummond obtained a tract of land adjoining the family grant, becoming a land owner in his own right. He then built the Toodyay district's first flour mill on the site. In 1841 and 1842, he went on a number of exploring expeditions with Captain John Scully.

During the early 1840s, Drummond's father and brother Johnston became increasingly involved in botanical collecting, and his brother John was appointed Inspector of Native Police at York. Consequently, James Drummond become increasingly responsible for the family farm, until by 1844 he was solely responsible for its management. In that year a severe recession hit the colony, and Drummond found himself deeply in debt. He continued to work Hawthornden under great financial stress for a number of years, but by 1850 was sufficiently recovered to take up a sheep station at Dandaragan. That year he joined a large group of pastoralists including Lockier Burges, John Sydney David and Thomas Brown in driving their stock overland to newly discovered grazing land at Champion Bay. On arriving, Drummond took up a large tract of land upon which he established the Oakabella station.

During the early 1850s, following the setting up of the Emigrant Depot in Toodyay, Drummond took the initiative to assist a number of married men with families who found it difficult to secure an employer. With the provision of a cottage, and acreage of virgin land for clearing and cultivating, the men were able to become self-sufficient and eventually purchase their own land. In the meantime Drummond had the benefit of their labour and a source of grain for his mill. This enabled him to fulfil his contracts to the government's commissariat. He also offered this assistance to ticket-of-leave holders and by 1855 Drummond had eight families settled on his land. While some landowners were sceptical and refused to offer similar assistance, others saw the benefits and followed his example.

On 26 February 1857 Drummond married Martha Ann Sewell, who was an aunt of George Malakoff Sewell. They had three sons and five daughters. Drummond's father died in 1863, and Drummond donated his father's herbarium to Ferdinand von Mueller.

From the mid-1840s, James Drummond became increasingly involved in the public affairs of the Toodyay district. He was a member of the Toodyay Roads Trust in the 1840s, and was also involved in the Toodyay Education Committee. Late in 1853 he was appointed a justice of the peace, and in 1857 he was elected to the Toodyay Roads Committee. By 1861 he was Chairman of the Toodyay Agricultural Society. By the time Western Australia gained responsible government in 1870, Drummond was widely acknowledged as the leader and spokesman for the Toodyay district. On 31 October 1870, he was elected to the seat of Toodyay in the Legislative Council with a huge majority. He was a member of seven of the ten parliamentary committees set up by the first parliament, and was also elected to the Central Board of Education. When a system of local government was introduced in 1871, Drummond was elected to the Victoria Plains Council, and the following year became a member of the Toodyay Roads Board.

The Avon region was notable for the number of early settlers of Scottish background. By the 1860s they felt it was time to establish their own Presbyterian church and the Toodyay Presbyterian Committee was formed. Drummond was a driving force and in October 1868 he wrote to the Colonial Secretary for an ecclesiastical grant of land, although this was to prove unsuccessful. A subscription list was circulated for donations to build a church. Reverend James M. Innes, who previously worked as an independent minister in the colony, was invited to come and hold services. On 19 January 1869 Innes was officially registered as a Presbyterian minister of the Toodyay district, establishing what became the first Presbyterian ministry in Western Australia.

Early in February 1873, Drummond returned home exhausted from having helped fight a bushfire that was threatening his paddocks and homestead, had a cold bath and caught pneumonia. He died about a week later on 8 February 1873, and was buried alongside his parents, his brother and one of his children at Hawthornden.
