= Cumberland (1827 ship) =

English-built ship wrecked near Cape Leeuwin, Australia

History

United Kingdom
- Name: Cumberland
- Namesake: Cumberland
- Owner: Steel, Lambden & Co., or Rankins
- Builder: C. C. Poney Guizelar, Cochin Dockyard; or Surat
- Launched: 1827
- Fate: Wrecked 4 March 1830

General characteristics
- Tons burthen: 444, or 464 (bm)
- Complement: 50 crew + two passengers
- Armament: 2 guns
- Notes: Teak-built

Cumberland was built in India in 1827, probably at Cochin but possibly at Surat. She sailed to Great Britain and assumed British registration. She traded between England and India under a license from the British East India Company (EIC). She wrecked in March 1830 near Cape Leeuwin coming from Sydney on her way to Bombay.

== Career ==
She entered Lloyd's Register in 1827 with A. Steel, master, Steel & Co., owner, and trade London–Bombay. Cumberland traded between England and India under a license from the EIC. On 5 November 1827, Cumberland, A. Steel, master, Cockerill & Co., ship's husband, sailed for Bombay.

Cumberland, Steel, master, arrived at Swan River on 12 October 1829 with passengers from Bombay.

The Register of Shipping for 1831 (published in 1830), showed Cumberland with Steel, master, Rankins, owner, and trade London–Bombay.

== Loss ==
Lloyd's List reported on 23 July 1830 that Cumberland, Steel, master, had been abandoned at sea. Cumberland had struck a rock and foundered in the Indian Ocean 150 nautical miles (280 km) south of Fremantle, Swan River Colony, near Cape Leeuwin at 34.297°S 115.0403°E. She was on a voyage from Sydney, New South Wales to Fremantle and Bombay.

Cumberland arrived at Fremantle on 12 October 1829 on her way from Bombay to Sydney with 580 thousand litres (16,000 imp bsh) of rice from Gujarat. She arrived at Sydney on 7 November and sold her cargo to Messrs. Cooper & Levy. T. G. Pitman chartered her to take a cargo of coal and some cattle at Newcastle for India; she was also carrying a printing press for Fremantle. She sailed from Newcastle on 2 February 1830.

She did not stop at Fremantle but at Cape Leeuwin she turned towards India. On 4 March she struck on a ledge about 1.9 kilometres (1 nmi) off Deepdene Beach and 11 kilometres (7 mi) north-west of Cape Leeuwin. On 5 March Captain Anthony Steel decided to abandon ship. He and the chief officer took the longboat and the cutter together with 29 crew members (the lascars), and one passenger. They arrived at Swan River on 7 March. The remainder of the crew and the other passenger took two boats. They landed at Cape Naturaliste. Three died of exhaustion before they were rescued at Port Leschenault. Parmelia took some of the crew and one passenger on to Singapore. Captain Steel returned to Bombay aboard Egyptian.
