= General view of the botany of the vicinity of Swan River =

General view of the botany of the vicinity of Swan River was first published in the Journal of the Royal Geographical Society of London 1.

General view of the botany of the vicinity of Swan River is an 1831 scientific paper by Scottish botanist Robert Brown. It discusses the vegetation of the Swan River Colony (in what is now Western Australia), and comments on its affinities with other regions. It has been described as "an essential step taken in our knowledge of the boundaries of the SW province".

== Background ==
Brown's paper was based on information derived from three plant collections: the collection of botanist Charles Fraser, made during an 1827 expedition under James Stirling; a collection received by Brown from Alexander Macleay, Colonial Secretary of New South Wales; and a collection received by Brown from James Mangles. Brown had already made use of these and other collections in preparing his Supplementum primum Prodromi florae Novae Hollandiae, published the previous year. In the course of his studies of Australian flora, he had prepared several manuscripts on the flora of the Swan River Colony: a list of plants of the Swan River Colony; a manuscript entitled Chloris Fluvii Cygni; and another entitled Proteaceae in occident.-meridionale... King George's Sound and Middle Island... Swan River... Baie de Geograph.

During 1830, Brown helped established the Royal Geographical Society, sitting on the committee that drew up its constitution, and subsequently sitting on its inaugural council. He read his General view of the botany of the vicinity of Swan River at one of the first meetings of the society, on November 22, 1830, and it was printed the following year in the first volume of the society's Journal. In 1866 it was reprinted in John Joseph Bennett's The miscellaneous botanical works of Robert Brown.

== Content ==
The paper begins by briefly describing the vegetation of the Swan River Colony, noting its richness in Proteaceae, Myrtaceae, Fabaceae (especially Acacia), Epacridaceae, Goodeniaceae and Asteraceae. Brown then notes the more prominent plants not in these families, in the course of which he transfers from Loranthus the well-known and unusual parasitic tree Nuytsia floribunda (West Australian Christmas Tree).

Brown then considers the biogeographic affinities of the region, emphasising the close relationship between the Swan River Colony flora and that of King George Sound and Lucky Bay on the south coast. On the other hand, he found very few species in common with the east coast at similar latitudes. Focussing on Proteaceae, he reiterates the assertion first made in his 1814 General remarks, geographical and systematical, on the botany of Terra Australis, that the flora of the west coast of Australia has a strong South African element, whereas the flora of the east coast has a strong South American element.

The paper closes with the observation that the noted dullness of Australian forests is due to the fact that the genera Eucalyptus and Acacia, both major components of the Australian vegetation, usually have stomata on both faces of their leaves, and thus lack a glossy upper face.

== Legacy ==
Ludwig Diels describes General view of the botany of the vicinity of Swan River as "an essential step taken in our knowledge of the boundaries of the SW province".
