= Drummond Cove, Western Australia =

Drummond Cove
- Suburb
- Interactive map of Drummond Cove
- Coordinates: 28°40′23″S 114°36′47″E
- Country: Australia
- State: Western Australia
- City: Geraldton
- LGA: City of Greater Geraldton
- Location: 12 km (7.5 mi) N of Geraldton

Government
  - State electorate: Geraldton
  - Federal division: Durack

Area
  - Total: 1.6 km^{2} (0.62 sq mi)

Population
  - Total: 1,605 (SAL 2021)
- Postcode: 6532
Suburbs around Drummond Cove
Indian Ocean	Buller	Buller
Indian Ocean	Drummond Cove	Glenfield
Indian Ocean	Glenfield	Glenfield

Drummond Cove is a coastal town located 12 kilometres (7 mi) north of Geraldton, Western Australia in the local government area of the City of Greater Geraldton. The locality was gazetted in 1985.

== History ==
The area at Drummond Cove was home to Aboriginal people and is part of the Yamatji Country of Western Australia. The bay was initially known as Smugglers Cove due to its use for the illegal export of sandalwood, shipped from there to evade the government royalty of £1/10/0 per ton, equivalent to A$210 per tonne in 2022 (it sold for the equivalent of A$1,279 per tonne in 2022).

In 1851 William Burges, Resident Magistrate at Champion Bay (Geraldton), promoted Drummond Cove as a port because of the availability of water, access to inland towns and stable foreshore. However the shallow cove was rocky and unsuitable for shipping, and Geraldton was chosen as the main settlement. Also in 1851, John Nicol Drummond, who was First Constable of Native Police of Western Australia in the Champion Bay area, acquired land next to the police reserve in the area. Over the next few years, he acquired additional adjoining land.

On 19 February 1852 he married Mary Shaw of Belvoir, Upper Swan and subsequently built a stone and thatch cottage where they lived for a number of years. The bay was renamed Drummond's Cove.

In the 1930s, Macedonian families moved into the area and established tomato gardens along the side of Chapman Road.

In the early 1940s, cray fishermen began arriving for the fishing season. They built shacks overlooking the cove.

In 1950, the Upper Chapman Road Board resumed 12 hectares (30 acres) of land surrounding the cove from White Peak Station, as a beach camping site. The board created 24 cottage blocks along the beachfront. The blocks were leased and by 1964, when the Shire of Greenough acquired the land a small community had been established. Leases were extended from 3 years, to 10 years, to 21 years, promoting further development.

Eventually, most leaseholders were granted freehold title to the land. In 2016, all land between Whitehill Road and the shore reverted to the Crown as "foreshore reserve" and all houses there were demolished or moved.

== Demographics ==
In the 2016 census, Drummond Cove had a population of 1477, 270% of the population of the Drummond Cove UCL in the 2001 census.

Census Year	Population	% Increase from Previous
2001	548 (UCL)	
2006	759	39%
2011	1,152	52%
2016	1,477	28%

In 2016 Drummond Cove residents had a median age of 34 and a median weekly income of A$849 (compared with the Western Australian median of A$724 per week). The population of Drummond Cove was predominantly Australian-born – 79.5% well above the state figure of 60.3%. 3.7% were born in England. 1.4% reported one or more parents of Italian birth.
