= Steere River =

River in Western Australia

Coordinates: 33°53′22″S 120°05′23″E

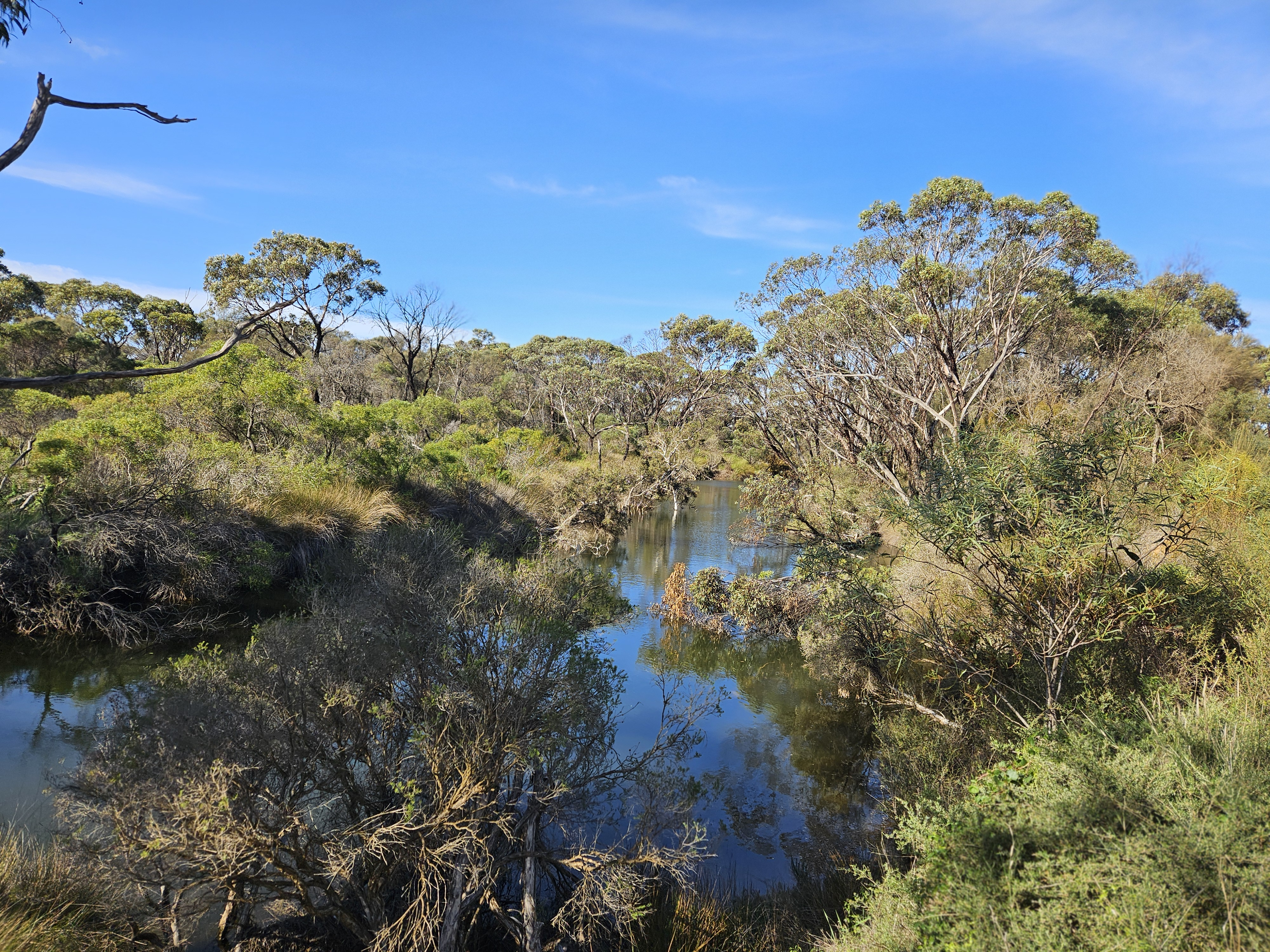
- The Steere River near Culham Inlet

Location
- Country: Australia

Physical characteristics
- Source
  - elevation: 103 metres (338 ft)
- Mouth
  - location: Culham Inlet
  - elevation: 1 metre (3 ft)
- Length: 35 km (22 mi)
- Basin size: 485 km^{2} (187 sq mi)

The Steere River is a river in the Goldfields–Esperance region of Western Australia.

The headwaters of the river rise below the Ravensthorpe Range in the vicinity of Elverdton then flow in a southerly direction until discharging into the north eastern end of Culham Inlet.

The waters of the river are naturally saline. The river drains an area of Archean volcanic and sedimentary rock that is mostly vegetated. The area to the north is hilly and rugged, but the area further south undulates gently.

The river has one tributary, Waindettup Creek.
