= Parmelia (barque) =

Sailing ship that transported colonists to Western Australia in 1829

History

United Kingdom
- Name: Parmelia
- Builder: Sheppard & Campbell–J.Jeffrey, Wolfe's Cove
- Launched: 3 May 1825
- Fate: Burnt May 1839 and sold for breaking up.

General characteristics
- Tons burthen: 443, or 44333/94 (bm)
- Length: 117 ft 8 in (35.9 m)
- Beam: 29 ft 1 in (8.9 m)
- Depth of hold: 20 ft (6.1 m)
- Sail plan: Barque

Parmelia was a barque built in Quebec, Canada, in 1825. Originally registered on 31 May in Quebec, she sailed to Great Britain and assumed British registry. She made one voyage for the British East India Company (EIC), in 1827–1828. In 1829 she transported the first civilian officials and settlers of the Swan River Colony to Western Australia. She then made two voyages transporting convicts to New South Wales, Australia. A fire damaged her irreparably in May 1839.

== Career ==
Parmelia "was more of a plain working girl than the great and beautiful lady of the sea". Parmelia sailed to London and on 17 November she was transferred from the Quebec to the London register. In 1826 she was used as a troop carrier.

== EIC voyage ==
Some time in the first half of 1827, Parmelia was sold to Joseph Somes, who was also a director of the EIC. For the next year, she operated under charter to the British East India Company, carrying goods and passengers between London and Bengal.

Captain John Wimble sailed from the Downs on 19 June 1827, bound for Bengal and Madras. Parmelia arrived at Calcutta on 3 December. Homeward bound, she was at Fultahm, on the Hooghly River, on 18 January 1828. She was at Vizagapatam on 30 January, and Madras on 9 February. She reached Saint Helena on 30 April and arrived at the Downs on 3 July.

== Settlers to Western Australia ==
In 1828 the British government, at the urging of Captain James Stirling, decided to establish a colony at the Swan River in Western Australia. HMS Challenger was despatched under Charles Fremantle to annex the colony, and it was arranged that a contingent of soldiers, officials and settlers would follow on HMS Sulphur. Stirling, whom the government had appointed the civil superintendent of the colony, however argued that the passengers and goods to be carried exceeded the capacity of Sulphur, and asked that an additional ship to be chartered. The government reluctantly agreed to the extra cost, chartering Parmelia in December 1828. It was then arranged that Sulphur would carry a detachment of the 63rd Regiment, with Parmelia carrying the civilian officials and settlers.

Sulphur and Parmelia sailed from Spithead off Portsmouth, England on 3 or 6 February 1829, sighting their destination on 1 June. Contrary to popular belief, Stirling did not captain Parmelia (J. H. Luscombe did); on arrival, however, he assumed the duties of pilot. He initially tried to enter Cockburn Sound through a passage that he had discovered in 1827, but was prevented by strong winds and a heavy swell. Instead he chose to remain off Rottnest Island for the night. The following day, he tried to bring Parmelia into the Sound from the north, against the advice of Fremantle, and ran aground on a sand bank, later to be named Parmelia Bank. Despite the best efforts of the crews to dislodge her, Parmelia remained on the bank for over 18 hours, finally coming off the bank by herself early the following morning. By that time, she had lost her foreyard, rudder, windlass, spare spars, longboat and skiff, and was leaking at a rate of 4 inches (10 cm) per hour. Parmelia then rode out a storm at anchor for three days before finally being brought to a safe anchorage. The passengers were able to disembark on 8 June.

Challenger was due to depart once Sulphur and Parmelia had arrived, but Parmelia needed repairs that it could not get without access to the skilled labour amongst Challenger crew. Fremantle therefore took the decision to remain and assist with the repairs, which were completed many weeks later. Later that year, Stirling chartered Parmelia to bring food supplies from Java. In 1830, she returned to England via Singapore. She carried to Singapore members of the crew of Cumberland, which had wrecked on 4 March.

=== Convict voyage #1 (1832) ===
Captain James Gilbert sailed from Sheerness on 28 July 1832. Parmelia arrived at Sydney on 16 November. She had embarked 200 male convicts and she landed 196, four having died en route. Parmelia sailed from Sydney late in December 1832 and arrived in Batavia on 29 January 1833. She left Batavia on 5 March, reached Saint Helena on 17 May, and arrived back at Portsmouth on 8 August.

=== Convict voyage #2 (1833–1834) ===
Captain James Gilbert sailed from Cork on 27 October 1833. Parmelia arrived at Sydney on 2 March 1834. She embarked 220 male convicts and she landed 218, two convicts having died en route. On 12 April Parmelia sailed for Manila.

=== Troop transport ===
In 1837 Parmelia and Prince Regent transported troops for the British government. On 19 January they carried the 82 Regiment of Foot from Dublin to Gibraltar. They then carried the 59th regiment of Foot from Gibraltar to Malta. On 14 March they carried the 5th Regiment of Foot from Malta to the Ionian Islands. Once they had completed the task, the British government hired the two vessels for £1,281 7s 9d to carry the remnants of the British Auxiliary Legion back from Spain to England. (Note: The British Auxiliary Legion, also called the British Legion (La Legión Británica) or Westminster Legion, existed from 1835 to 1837. It was a British military force sent to Spain to support the Liberals and Queen Isabella II of Spain against the Carlists in the First Carlist War.)

== Fate ==
Parmelia then continued to sail as a London-based transport. She was last listed in 1838 with J. Spence, master, J. Somes, owner, and trade London-transport. In 1839 Parmelia was refitted to carry migrants to the Americas. She was intended to run between Britain and Quebec, but on 1 May 1839, as her refit was almost complete, a fire in Bank's Yard, at Frank's Queery, Cremyll, destroyed her. Eight days later she was surveyed and declared a constructive total loss. She was then sold for breaking up.

The Kwinana suburb of Parmelia is named in honour of Parmelia, as is Parmelia Bank.

== Passengers on Parmelia, 1829 ==
The following people embarked Parmelia when she left Portsmouth in February 1829.

Name	Notes
Captain James Stirling	Governor
Ellen Stirling	Wife of Captain Stirling
Andrew Stirling	Son of Captain Stirling, 3 yrs old
Frederick Henry Stirling	Son of Captain Stirling, born at sea on 16 April 1829.
George Mangles	Cousin of Ellen Stirling
George Eliot	Clerk to Captain Stirling, also his nephew
Thomas Blakey	Servant of Captain Stirling
Sarah Blakey	Wife of Thomas Blakey; servant of Captain Stirling
John Kelly	Servant of Captain Stirling
Elizabeth Kelly	Wife of John Kelly; servant of Captain Stirling
Peter Brown (Note: Brown was born as, and later returned to using, the French spelling Broun.)	Colonial Secretary
Caroline Brown	Wife of Peter Brown
Macbride Brown	Son of Peter Brown
Ann Brown	Daughter of Peter Brown
Richard Evans	Servant of Peter Brown
Margaret McLeod	Servant of Peter Brown
Mary Ann Smith	Servant of Peter Brown
John Morgan	Storekeeper
Rebecca Morgan	Wife of John Morgan
Rebecca Morgan	Daughter of John Morgan
Ann Skipsey	Servant of John Morgan
Commander Mark Currie RN	Harbourmaster
Jane Currie	Wife of Commander Currie
Frederick Ludlow	Servant of Commander Currie
Mildred ("Kitty") Ludlow	Wife of Frederick Ludlow; servant of Commander Currie
Jane Fruin	Servant of Commander Currie
John Septimus Roe	Surveyor-General
Matilda Roe	Wife of John Septimus Roe
Charles Wright	Servant of John Septimus Roe
Henry Sutherland	Assistant Surveyor
Ann Sutherland	Wife of Henry Sutherland
William Sheldon	Clerk to the Colonial Secretary
James Drummond	Horticulturalist
Sarah Drummond	Wife of James Drummond
Thomas Drummond	Son of James Drummond, 18 yrs
Jane Drummond	Daughter of James Drummond, 16 yrs
James Drummond	Son of James Drummond, 15 yrs
John Drummond	Son of James Drummond, 13 yrs
Johnston Drummond	Son of James Drummond, 9 yrs
Euphemia Drummond	Daughter of James Drummond, 3 yrs. The last of Parmelia's passengers to die, on 4 December 1920 aged 94 (at Culham near Toodyay).
Elizabeth Gamble	Servant of James Drummond
Charles Simmons	Surgeon
Tully Davy (Note: Tully and Jessie Davy were lost overboard and drowned on 25 April 1829.)	Assistant Surgeon
Jane Davy	Wife of Tully Davy
Jessie Jane Davy (Note: Tully and Jessie Davy were lost overboard and drowned on 25 April 1829.)	Daughter of Tully Davy, 8 yrs
Joseph Davy	Son of Tully Davy, 6 yrs
Henry Davy	Son of Tully Davy, 4 yrs
Edward Davy	Son of Tully Davy, 2 yrs
Emily Rose Davy	Daughter of Tully Davy, 2 months
James Elliott	Servant of Tully Davy
Patrick Murphy	Servant of Tully Davy
Alex Fandom	Cooper
Mary Fandom	Wife of Alex Fandom
William Hokin (Note: Hoking also used.)	Bricklayer
Mary Hokin	Wife of William Hokin
William Hokin	Son of William Hokin, 14 years
John Hokin	Son of William Hokin, 12 yrs
Mary Hokin	Daughter of William Hokin, 10 yrs
Thomas Hokin	Son of William Hokin, 8 yrs
David Hokin	Son of William Hokin, 5 yrs
Charles Hokin	Son of William Hokin, 2 yrs
Thomas Davis	Smith
Catherine Davis	Wife of Thomas Davis
John Davis	Son of Thomas Davis, 3 yrs
Charlotte Davis	Daughter of Thomas Davis, 2 yrs. First white female to go ashore.
John Davis	Nephew of Thomas Davis, 13 yrs
James Smith	Boatbuilder
Sarah Smith	Wife of James Smith
James Moore	Servant
— Cameron	Government mariner
John Ferguson	Government carpenter
John McKail	Turner
Thomas Welch	Mariner
Stephen Knight	Carpenter
John Hall	Painter
