= White Peak Station =

Pastoral lease in Western Australia

White Peak Station, also known as White Peak Homestead, is a property situated in the Shire of Chapman Valley approximately 16 kilometres (10 mi) north north east of Geraldton in the Mid West region of Western Australia. The White Peak Homestead was one of the five original pastoral leases established in the region. It was settled by John Drummond, a pioneer pastoralist. The homestead and surroundings retain the homestead building, which is notable for its large scale and grand detailing in comparison with other farmhouses in the region. Outbuildings including stone stables, tack room, shearing shed, machinery sheds are still in place, although some original stone walls have been demolished.

== History ==
Drummond accompanied William Burges in 1849 on a review of the pastoral potential of the country north of Champion Bay. Both Burges and Drummond took up pastoral leases in the region.

In 1851 Drummond took up a lease of 4,000 acres north of Smugglers Cove and named it White Peak, a name inspired by a conical hill on the lease with a large, exposed face of limestone on the summit. Drummond subsequently added a leasehold of 3,000 acres to the southern boundary of White Peak. He also purchased 10 acres near the mouth of Buller River, where he built a small cottage and several outbuildings for his new wife, naming it Red Cliffs. Drummond and his wife Mary lived at Red Cliffs for about 10 years. Mary is believed to have been the first white woman to settle in the district and their daughter, who died in infancy, the first white child born in the region. This buildings at Red Cliffs has since been demolished.

In 1855 copper was discovered on White Peak. A company called The White Peak Copper Mining Company was floated by Drummond and George Shenton in 1855, however, after producing only a small volume of metal, then worth 126 pounds a tonne, this company went out of operation in 1858.

In 1857 Drummond resigned from the police force following a transfer to Albany, and settled permanently at White Peak, commencing work on the larger White Peak Homestead. This homestead is constructed of local stone sourced from the White Peak Quarry. The homestead had walled gardens that kept the sheep and cattle out. Grapes were grown and wine distilled on the property.

In 1881 Edward Charles Wittenoom, who was related to Drummond by marriage, purchased White Peak, where he established a notable sheep stud. He also made additions to the homestead, which are still discernible, including the two large rooms on the western elevation. The White Peak Station had its own railway siding called the Wokarena Siding.

The White Peak Station was not re-purchased by the Government for closer settlement like other pastoral leases, however, various parcels of land from the property have been sold privately.
