= Marquis of Anglesea (1815 ship) =

UK merchant and migrant ship 1815–1829

History

United Kingdom
- Name: Marquis of Anglesea
- Namesake: Henry Paget, 1st Marquess of Anglesey
- Builder: B. Heward, Sunderland
- Launched: 1 November 1815
- Fate: Wrecked 4 September 1829

General characteristics
- Tons burthen: 35172/94, or 352, or 35246/94 (bm)

Marquis of Anglesea was a British ship, launched in 1815 at Sunderland. She initially traded with India under a license from the British East India Company (EIC). She then traded with the Americas. In 1829, she carried 104 settlers and troops to the Swan River Colony. She was wrecked there on 4 September 1829, a few days after she had landed the settlers and her cargo. Her hulk served the Colony's government for some three years before a storm finally destroyed her.

== Career ==
Marquis of Anglesey first appeared in Lloyd's Register (LR) in 1816. In 1813 the EIC had lost its monopoly on the trade between India and Britain. British ships were then free to sail to India or the Indian Ocean under a license from the EIC. Marquis of Anglesea's owners applied for a licence on 6 January 1816, which they received on 9 January.

Marquis of Anglesey sailed to Bombay and Fort William on 6 April 1816, under a license. A later report showed her sailing to Madras and Bengal.

| Year | Master | Owner | Trade | Source |
|---|---|---|---|---|
| 1816 | Moorson | Moorson | London–India | LR |
| 1819 | McGregor | Moorson | London–India | LR |

On 5 September 1819, Marquis of Anglesey, Thomas McGregor, master, arrived at Quebec with some passengers from London.

| Year | Master | Owner | Trade | Source |
|---|---|---|---|---|
| 1820 | McGregor; Reid | Morris & Co. | London-Quebec; London–Jamaica | LR |
| 1825 | C.Reed | Morris & Co. | London–Jamaica | LR |

On 11 December 1825, Marquis of Anglesea put into Montevideo after she struck the "English Bank", having sustained minimal damage. She was on her way from London to Buenos Aires.

| Year | Master | Owner | Trade | Source |
|---|---|---|---|---|
| 1826 | Stewart | Barrick | London–Buenos Aires | LR |
| 1830 | Stewart | Barrick | London–Swan River | LR |

Marquis of Anglesea arrived at the Swan River Colony on 23 August 1829. Although she was anchored at Gage Roads, some distance from Cockburn Sound and Fremantle, she landed her 90 settlers, 14 troops, and almost all of her cargo. She was the sixth vessel to arrive at the Colony.

== Fate ==
A gale drove Marquis of Anglesea ashore on 4 September 1829, wrecking her beyond repair. However, she did not break up, as had been expected. Instead, the colony found several uses for her. She had been condemned and sold for £180 to George Leake. He turned around and leased her to the government for £100 per year. She then was variously the Governor's residence when he visited Fremantle, the Harbour Master's office, the Post Office, a colonial gaol, an asylum, and a prison ship for refractory servants. She was Western Australia's first prison hulk.

A storm finally destroyed her some three years later.
