= Wale (ship part) =

Thicker plank in the hull of a ship

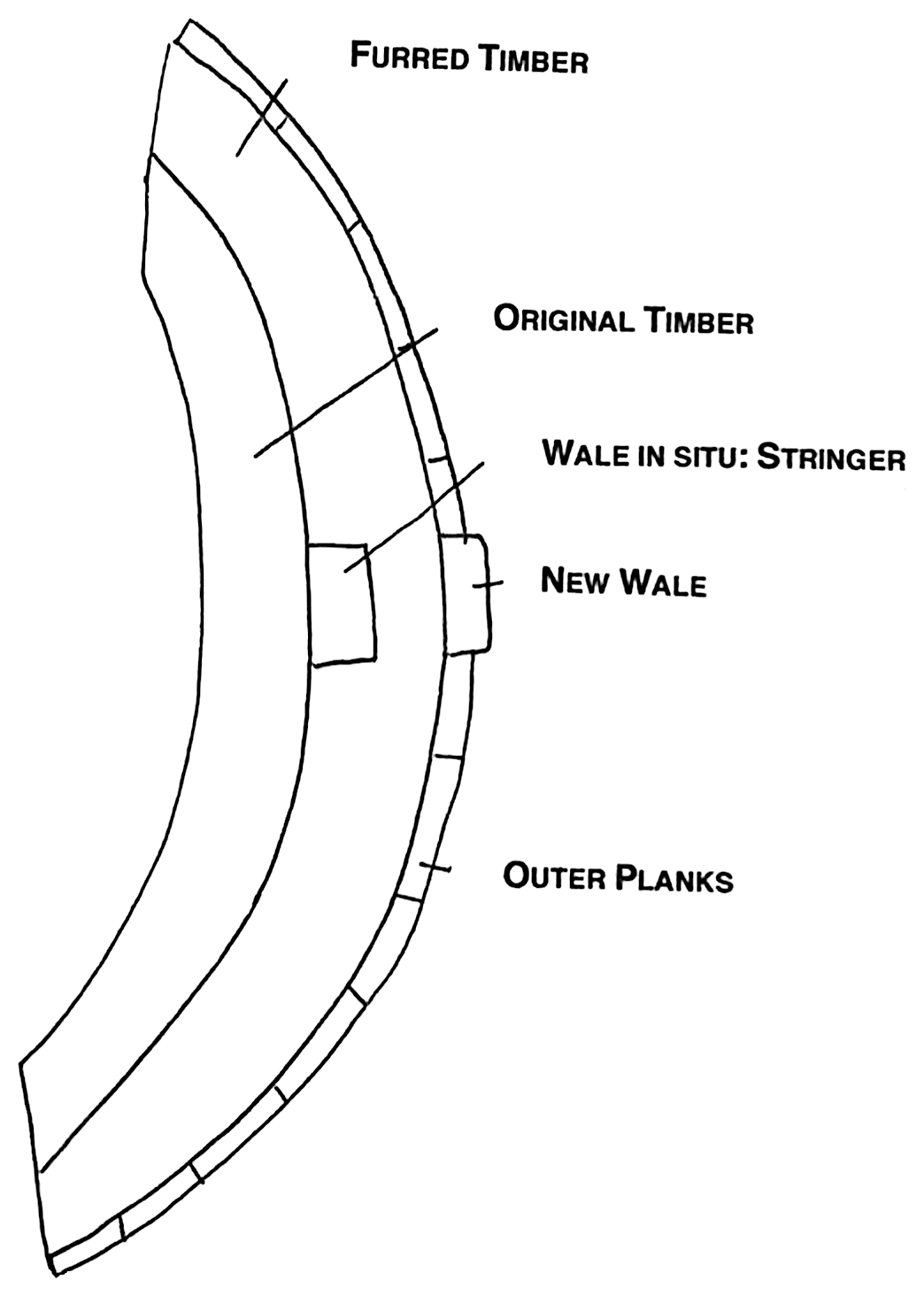
Profile view of ship frames doubled by "ripping off the planks, and putting second timbers upon the first timbers, and upon them again other planks (Perrin 1929, 92)." The wale remains in situ, as a structural stringer.

A wale is one of the strakes of wooden planking that forms the outer skin of the hull of a ship, but substantially thicker than the other strakes. It provides extra stiffening and strength to the hull. It was a common feature of heavy wooden ship construction, particularly from the Middle Ages to the early years of the 19th century, being a major constructional component of ships like USS Constitution, HMS Victory and many earlier vessels.

== See also ==
- Strake
