= Culham Inlet =

Inlet in Western Australia

- Culham Inlet looking north-east

- Interactive map of Culham Inlet
- Coordinates: 33°54′29″S 120°04′07″E
- Country: Australia
- State: Western Australia
- LGA: Shire of Ravensthorpe

Culham Inlet is an inlet located in the Goldfields-Esperance region of Western Australia. The inlet is also referred to as a coastal salt lake or a transient estuary, as the sand bar that prevents it discharging is almost always closed. The wetlands formed by the system are listed in a Directory of Important Wetlands in Australia due to their ecological significance.

The inlet is located on the eastern flank of East Mount Barren in the Fitzgerald River National Park and is approximately 7 kilometres (4 mi) west of Hopetoun.

The inlet is a wave dominated estuary with a degraded catchment, that is a result of substantial clearing and a saline run-off. It covers a total area of 11.3 square kilometres (4 sq mi). The lagoon area is shallow with a typical maximum depth of 2 metres (7 ft) with a record depth of 4.5 metres (15 ft) recorded after exceptional rainfall. Two rivers discharge into the inlet, the Phillips and the Steere.

The inlet is separated from the Southern Ocean by a bar of dunes between 30 metres (98 ft) to 40 metres (131 ft) wide. The dunes are breached intermittently, breaking naturally in 1849, 1872, 1919, 1993, 2000, 2016 and 2017, and artificially in 1920, each time for a period of 3 to 4 weeks.

The inlet was a river valley prior to 6,500 years ago when a rise in sea levels caused the valley to flood, it would have remained an open estuary until 3,500 years ago when the sand bar at the entrance built up to such a degree that discharge into the ocean was prevented. Then further dune building occurred so that breaks became less frequent.

The area periodically supports a large array of flora and fauna. It is used as a commercial fishery and supplied large catches of Black Bream. The waters also support populations of smaller endemic species such as Goby and two Hardyheads. A large population of waterbirds is also found in the area with up to 25 species being recorded in the inlet.

The inlet was named by John Septimus Roe, who named the inlet in 1848 after the Toodyay homestead of his son in law, Samuel Pole Phillips.
