= Phillips River =

River in Western Australia

Coordinates: 33°53′07″S 120°04′28″E

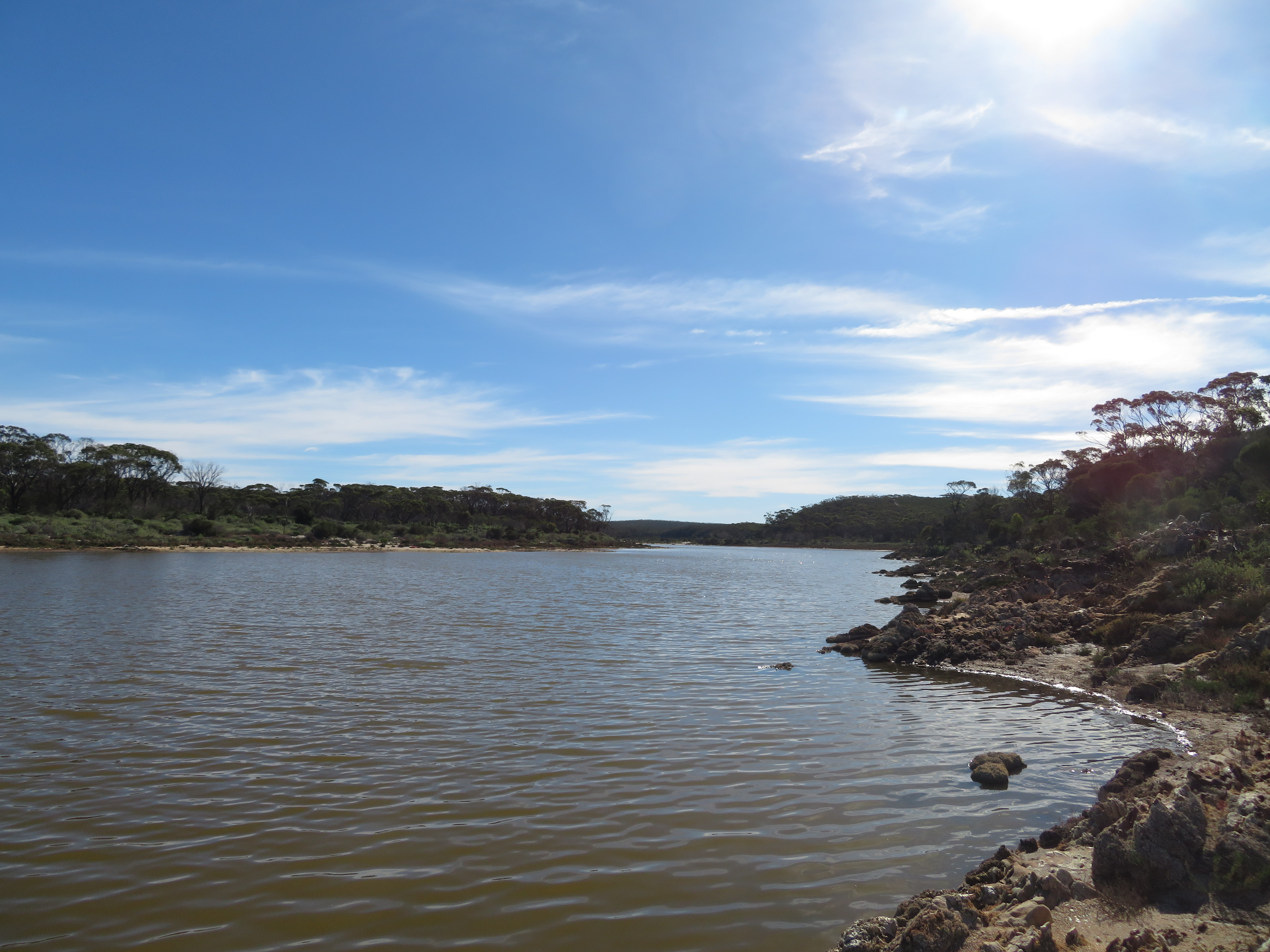
- Phillips River in Western Australia

Location
- Country: Australia

Physical characteristics
- Source
  - location: Mount Madden
  - elevation: 188 metres (617 ft)
- Mouth
  - location: Culham Inlet
  - elevation: sea level
- Length: 120 km (75 mi)
- Basin size: 2,307 km^{2} (891 sq mi)
- Discharge
  - average: 7,300 ML/a (0.23 m^{3}/s; 8.2 cu ft/s)

The Phillips River is an ephemeral river in the Goldfields–Esperance region of Western Australia.

Its headwaters rise on the sandplains below Mount Madden and flow in a southerly direction, crossing the South Coast Highway approximately 20 kilometres (12 mi) west of Ravensthorpe, entering the Fitzgerald River National Park and veering eastward to follow a fault-line in the quartzite rocks around the eastern end of the Barren Range. The river finally discharges into Culham Inlet and, when the inlet is open to the ocean, into the Southern Ocean.

There are six tributaries, including West River, Jackilup Creek, Yarracarrup Creek and Kybalup Creek.

The river's catchment is 35% cleared, with the southern half lying within the boundaries of the Fitzgerald River National Park. The entire catchment lies within the Fitzgerald River Biosphere.

Phillips River flows for only a short time each year, mostly during the winter months in the middle of the year. The river water is naturally saline but varies from almost fresh to more saline than seawater.

The river was named by John Septimus Roe, who made the first recorded sighting of the river in 1848, after his son in law, Samuel Pole Phillips.

From 1892, it was the site of a gold rush. A de facto town, known initially as Phillips River, sprang up. In 1901, the town was gazetted under the name Ravensthorpe.
