= Samuel Pole Phillips =

Australian politician

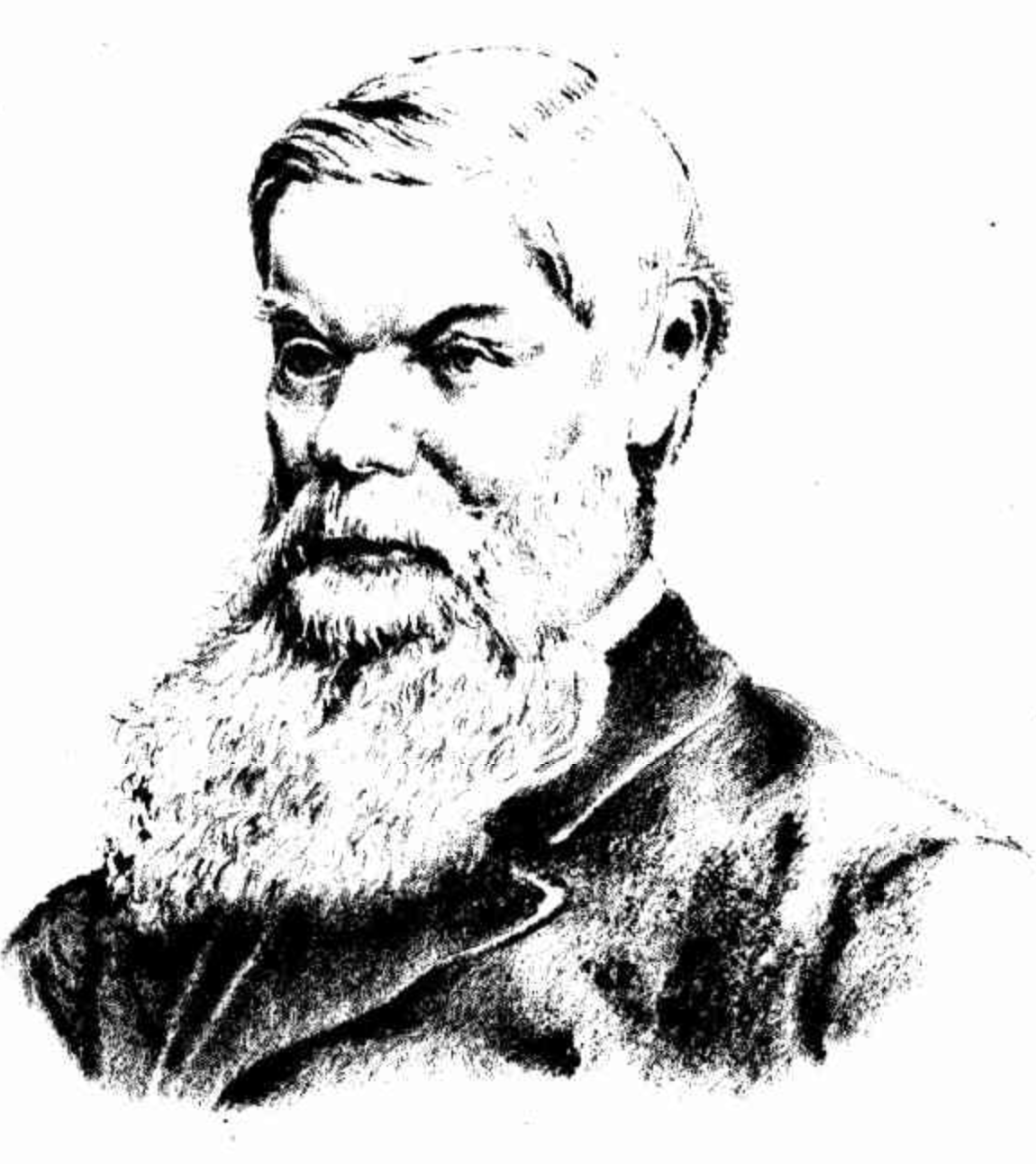
Phillips in 1888

Samuel Pole Phillips (11 March 1819 – 13 June 1901) was an Australian pastoralist and politician.

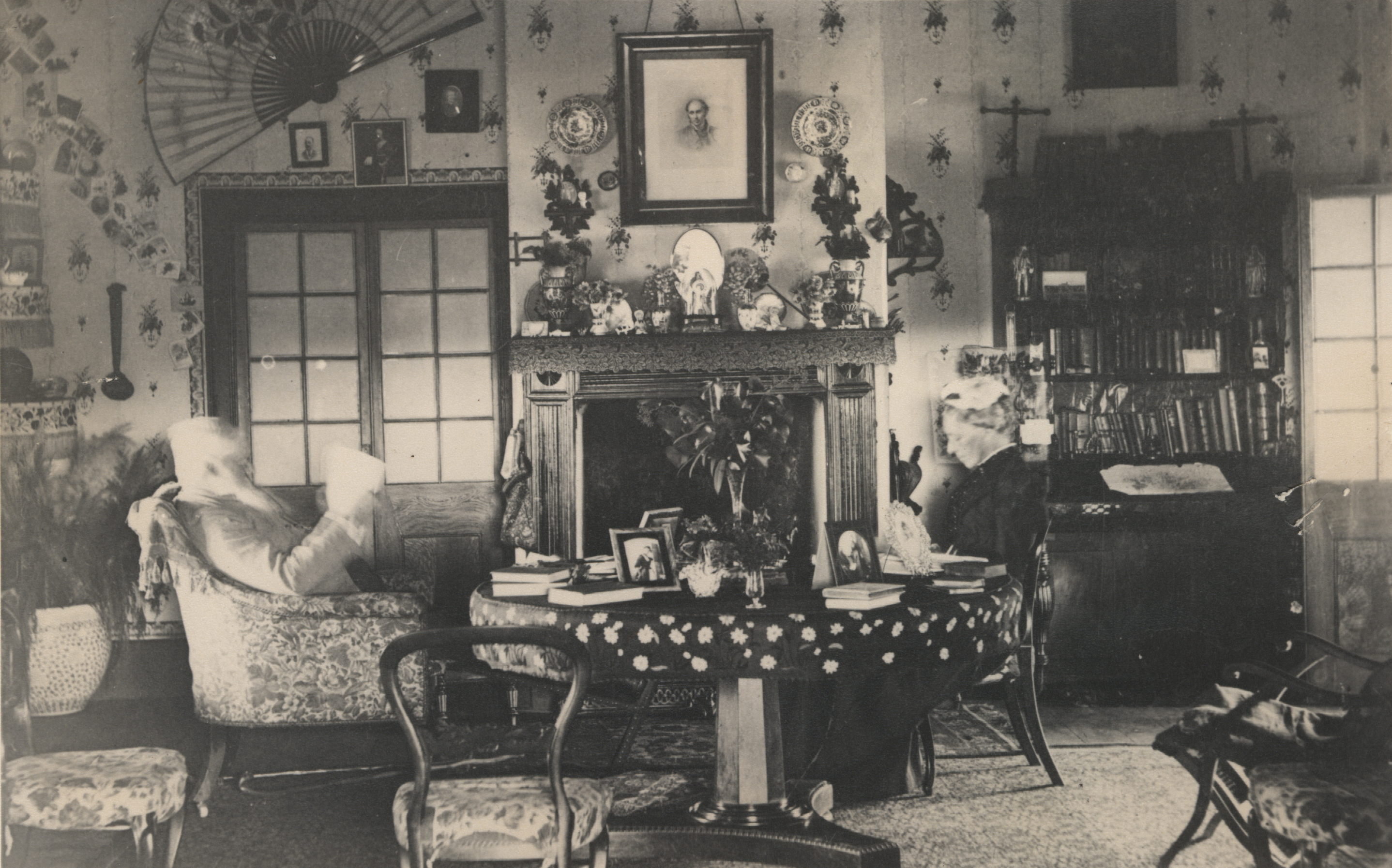
Phillips and his wife in the drawing room at Culham Homestead, Western Australia c1890

Phillips was born in Culham in Oxfordshire and was educated for the Anglican ministry at Winchester College.

== Emigration to Australia ==
He decided to emigrate to Australia and arrived in Western Australia aboard the Montreal in 1839.

=== Business enterprises and public role in Western Australia ===
He went into business with his relative, Edward Hamersley, and acquired land in the Toodyay Valley, where Phillips built his homestead named Culham. The land was acquired from Alfred Waylen, who had taken up large tracts in the area after it was explored by Robert Dale then opened up to pastoralists. After developing Culham for 12 years Phillips pioneered the area around the Irwin River and took up 20,000 acres (8,094 ha), which he stocked with cattle. He was later joined by Hamersley, Burges and Vigors forming a cattle stud business. When the partnership dissolved Phillips' share was composed of an 8,000-acre (3,237 ha) estate and over 100,000 acres (40,469 ha) of leaseholdings.

Nominated to join the Legislative Council in June 1857 he later represented the Eastern Districts and remained until his retirement in 1872.

== Death and legacy ==
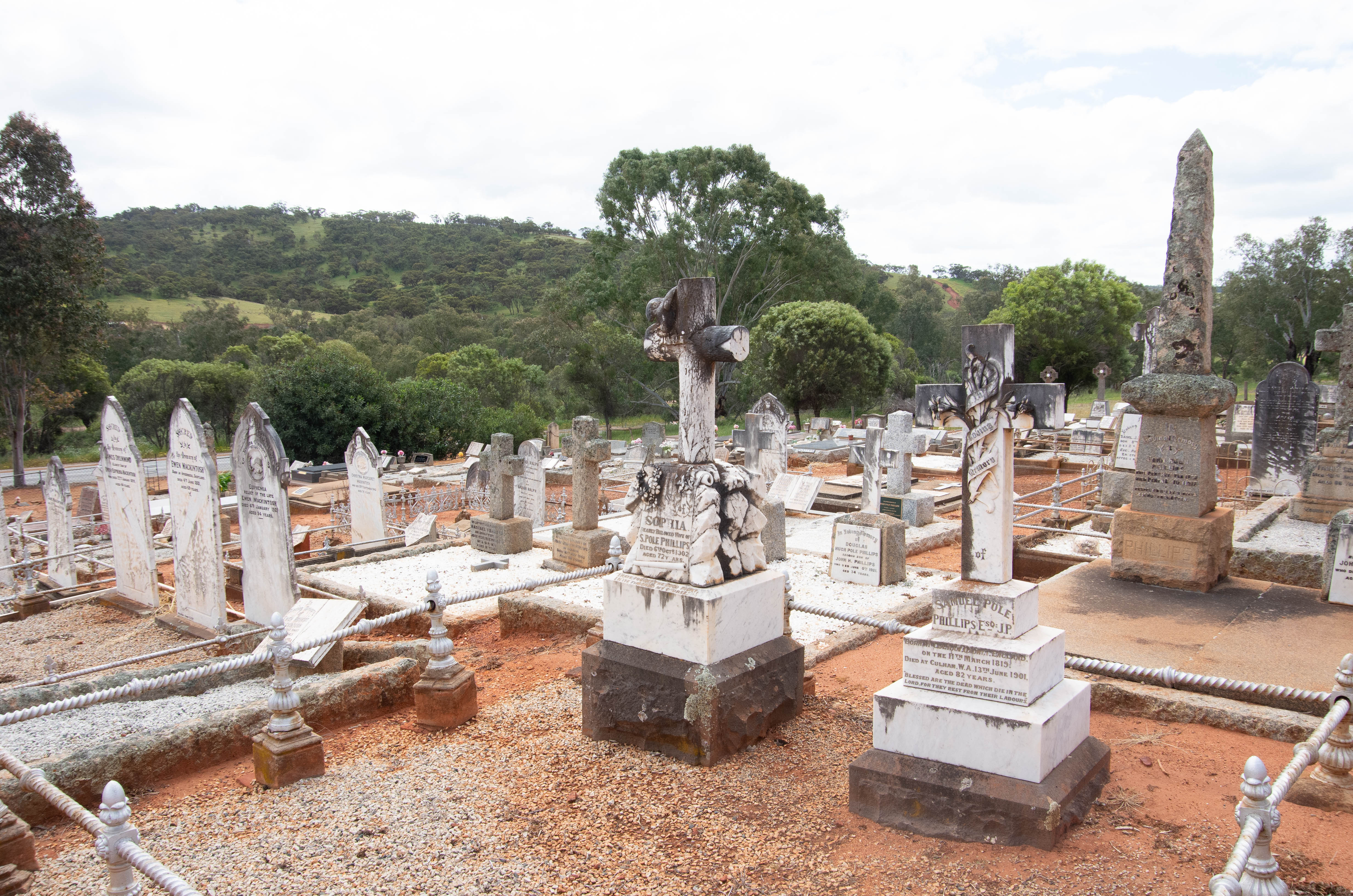
Grave of Samuel Pole Phillips at St Philip Church Cemetery

Phillips died on 13 June 1901 and was buried at the St Philip Church cemetery at Culham near Toodyay. The service was the largest seen in the district at the time. His son, Samuel James Phillips, was also a member of parliament.

The Phillips River discovered by Phillips' father-in-law, John Septimus Roe, in 1848. Roe named the river after his son-in-law, and Culham Inlet after his estate.
