= Swan River Colony =

British colony in Western Australia (1829–1833)

- 17 June 1829–6 February 1832
- History
  - Established: 17 June 1829
  - Disestablished: 6 February 1832
Succeeded by
Colony of Western Australia
- Today part of: Australia

This article is part of the series
History of Australia
Capital cities
Adelaide
Brisbane
Canberra
Darwin
Hobart
Melbourne
Perth
Sydney

The Swan River Colony, also known as the Swan River Settlement, or just Swan River, was a British colony established in 1829 on the Swan River. This initial settlement place on the Swan River was soon named Perth, and it became the capital city of Western Australia.

The name was a pars pro toto for Western Australia. In 1831, the military outpost Frederick Town, Colony of New South Wales (Fremantle Town) was transferred from the Colony of New South Wales to the Swan River Colony and renamed Albany, and on 6 February 1832, the Swan River Colony was renamed the Colony of Western Australia, when the colony's founding lieutenant-governor, Captain James Stirling, belatedly received his commission. However, the name Swan River Colony remained in informal use for many years.

== European exploration ==
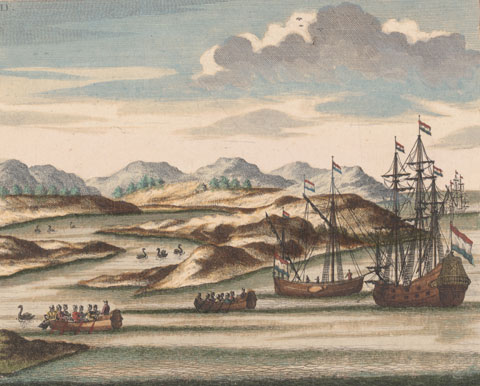
Willem de Vlamingh's ships, with black swans, at the entrance to the Swan River, Western Australia, coloured engraving (1796), derived from an earlier drawing (now lost) from the de Vlamingh expeditions of 1696–97

The first recorded Europeans to sight land where the city of Perth is now located were Dutch sailors. Most likely the first visitor to the Swan River area was Frederick de Houtman on 19 July 1619, travelling on the ships Dordrecht and Amsterdam. His records indicate he first reached the Western Australian coast at latitude 32°20', which is approximately at Warnbro Sound. He did not land because of heavy surf, and so proceeded northwards without much investigation.

On 28 April 1656, Vergulde Draeck en route to Batavia (now Jakarta) was shipwrecked 107 kilometres (66 mi) north of the Swan River near Ledge Point. Of the 193 on board, only 75 made it to shore. A small boat that survived the wreckage then sailed to Batavia for help, but a subsequent search party found none of the survivors. The wreck was rediscovered in 1963.

In 1658, three Dutch Republic ships, also partially searching for Vergulde Draeck visited the area. Waekende Boey under Captain S. Volckertszoon, Elburg under Captain J. Peereboom and Emeloort under Captain A. Joncke sighted Rottnest Island but did not proceed any closer to the mainland because of the many reefs. They then travelled north and subsequently found the wreck of Vergulde Draeck (but still no survivors). They gave an unfavourable opinion of the area partly due to the dangerous reefs.

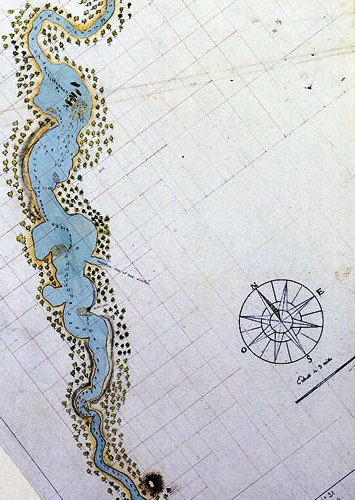
The first detailed map of the Swan River, drawn by the French in 1801

The Dutch captain Willem de Vlamingh was the next European in the area. Commanding three ships, Geelvinck, Nijptangh and Weseltje, he arrived at and named Rottnest Island on 29 December 1696, and on 10 January 1697 visited and named the Swan River. His ships could not sail up the river because of a sand bar at its mouth, so he sent out a sloop which even then required some dragging over the sand bar. They sailed until reaching mud flats probably near Heirisson Island. They saw some Aboriginal people but were not able to meet any close up. Vlamingh was also not impressed with the area, and this was probably the reason for a lack of Dutch exploration from then on.

In 1801, the French ships Géographe captained by Nicolas Baudin and Naturaliste captained by Emmanuel Hamelin visited the area from the south. While Géographe continued northwards, Naturaliste remained for a few weeks. A small expedition dragged longboats over the sand bar and explored the Swan River. They also gave unfavourable descriptions regarding any potential settlement due to many mud flats upstream and the sand bar (the sand bar wasn't removed until the 1890s when C. Y. O'Connor built Fremantle harbour).

Later in March 1803, Géographe, with another ship Casuarina, passed by Rottnest Island on their way eventually back to France, but did not stop longer than a day or two.

The next visit to the area was the first Australian-born maritime explorer, Phillip Parker King in 1822 on Bathurst. King was also the son of former Governor Philip Gidley King of New South Wales. However, King also was not impressed with the area.

== Background to the settlement ==
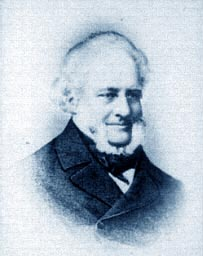
James Stirling

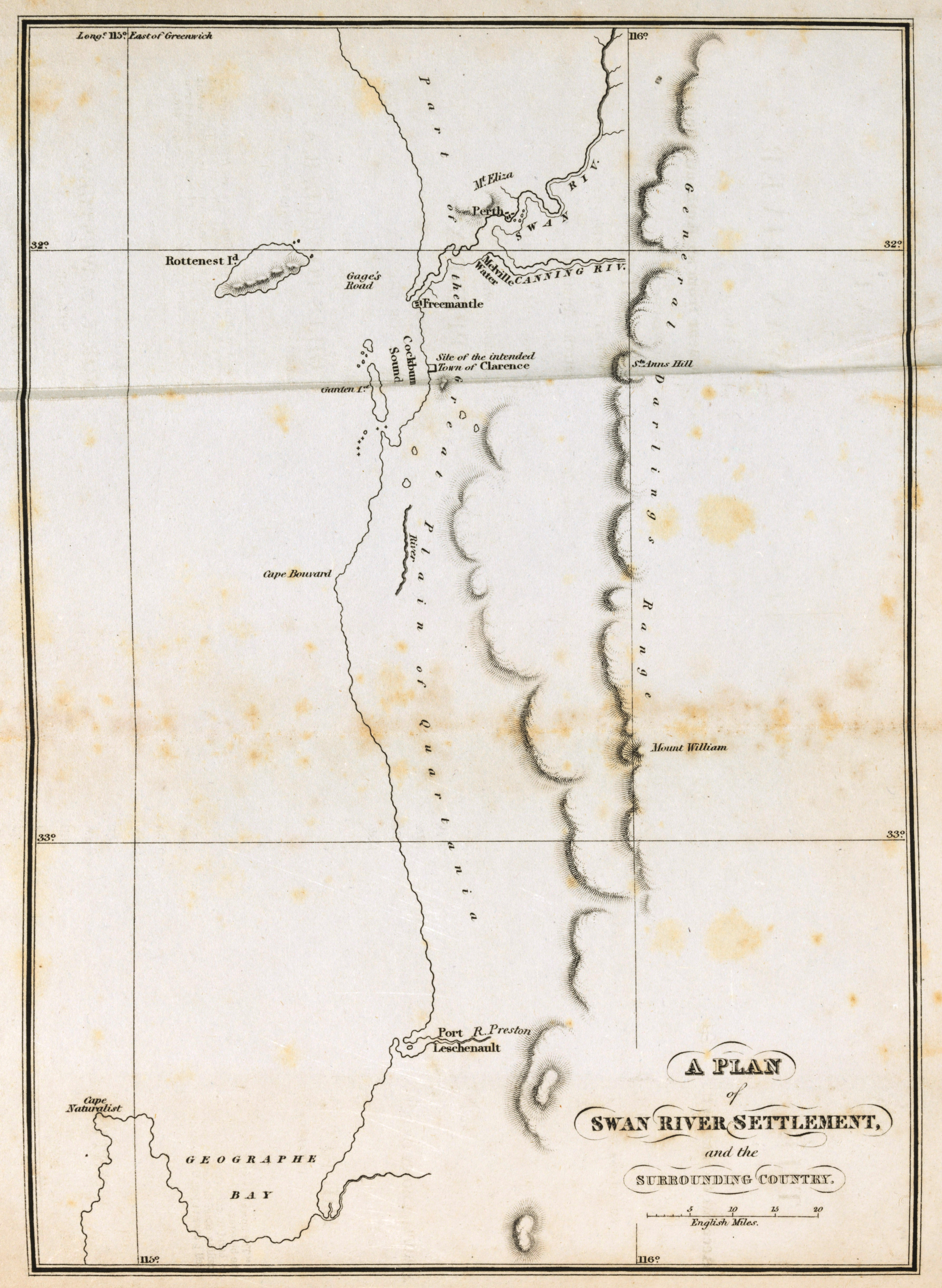
Swan River Settlement and surrounding country (1831)

The founding father of Western Australia was Captain James Stirling who, in 1827, explored the Swan River area in HMS Success which first anchored off Rottnest, and later in Cockburn Sound. He was accompanied by Charles Fraser, the New South Wales botanist.

Their initial exploration began on 8 March in a cutter and gig with parties continuing on foot from 13 March. In late March, Success moved to Sydney, arriving there on 15 April. Stirling arrived back in England in July 1828, promoting in glowing terms the agricultural potential of the area. His lobbying was for the establishment of a free settlement – unlike penal colonies at New South Wales, Port Arthur and Norfolk Island – in the Swan River area with himself as its governor. As a result of these reports, and a rumour in London that the French were about to establish a penal colony in the western part of Australia, possibly at Shark Bay, the Colonial Office assented to the proposal in mid-October 1828.

In December 1828, a Secretary of State for Colonies despatch reserved land for the Crown, as well as for the clergy, and for education, and specified that water frontage was to be rationed. The most cursory exploration had preceded the British decision to found a settlement at the Swan River; the most makeshift arrangements were to govern its initial establishment and the granting of land; and the most sketchy surveys were to be made before the grants were actually occupied. A set of regulations were worked out for distributing land to settlers based on land grants. Negotiations for a privately run settlement were also started with a consortium of four gentlemen headed by Potter McQueen, a member of Parliament who had already acquired a large tract of land in New South Wales. The consortium withdrew after the Colonial Office refused to give it preference over independent settlers in selecting land, but one member, Thomas Peel, accepted the terms and proceeded alone. Peel was allocated 200,000 hectares (500,000 acres), conditional on his arrival at the settlement before 1 November 1829 with 400 settlers. Peel arrived after this date with only 300 settlers, but was still granted 100,000 hectares (250,000 acres).

== Events of the settlement ==
Swan River Colony ship arrivals in 1829
25 April	HMS Challenger (Fremantle)
31 May	Parmelia (Stirling)
6 June	HMS Sulphur
5 August	Calista
6 August	Saint Leonard
23 August	Marquis of Anglesea
19 September	Thompson
21 September	Amity
5 October	Georgiana
9 October	Ephemina
12 October	Orelia
12 October	Cumberland
12 October	Caroline
17 October	Governor Phillip
19 October	Atwick
23 October	Lotus; John Summerson
31 October	Admiral Gifford
11 November	Lion (Lyon)
14 November	Dragon
28 November	HMS Success
15 December	Gilmore (Peel)

The first ship to reach the Swan River was HMS Challenger. After anchoring off Garden Island on 25 April 1829 and then in Cockburn Sound on 27 April, Captain Charles Fremantle claimed "all that part of New Holland which is not included within the territory of New South Wales" on 2 May for Britain.

Parmelia arrived in Cockburn Sound on 2 June carrying Stirling and his party, and HMS Sulphur arrived on 8 June carrying members of the 63rd Regiment and families. The first settlement of the Swan River Colony, named Sulphur Town after Sulphur, "comprised a party of about 250 military personnel, free colonists of the gentry class, and their indentured worker" from Parmelia and Sulphur, and was situated on Garden Island near Cliff Point. A party from Parmelia then encamped on Rous Head on the northern side of the Swan River on 17 June, thus establishing the Swan River Colony. Three merchant ships arrived shortly after: Calista on 5 August, St Leonard on 6 August and Marquis of Anglesea on 23 August.

A series of accidents followed the arrivals which probably nearly caused the abandonment of the expedition. Challenger and Sulphur both struck rocks while entering Cockburn Sound and were fortunate to escape with only minor damage. Parmelia however, under Stirling's "over confident pilotage", also ran aground, lost her rudder and damaged her keel, which necessitated extensive repairs. With winter now set in, the settlers were obliged to land on Garden Island. Bad weather and the required repairs meant that Stirling did not manage to reach the mainland until 18 June, and the remaining settlers on Parmelia finally arrived in early August. In early September a major disaster occurred: Marquis of Anglesea was driven ashore during a gale and wrecked beyond repair. The ship did not break up, as had been expected, but instead survived to become Western Australia's first prison hulk.

The first reports of the new colony arrived back in England in late January 1830. They described the poor conditions and the starving state of the colonists, deemed the land totally unfit for agriculture, and reported (incorrectly) that the settlers had abandoned the colony. As a result of these reports, many people cancelled their migration plans or diverted to Cape Town in South Africa, or to the more well-established New South Wales colony.

Nevertheless, a few settlers arrived and additional stores were dispatched. By 1832 the population of the colony had reached about 1,500. Aboriginal people were not counted at that time, but in the south west have been estimated to number 15,000. The difficulty of clearing land to grow crops was so great that by 1850 the population of settlers had increased only to 5,886. This population had settled mainly around the southwestern coastline at Bunbury, Augusta and Albany.

Edward Gibbon Wakefield used the Swan River Colony to illustrate the importance of combined labour and the danger of a dispersed population. In his Letter from Sydney, published anonymously in 1829, and later in his England and America, published in 1833, Wakefield criticised the Swan River land grants for failing to encourage the development of a necessary class of wage-labourers.

Karl Marx, in Das Kapital, used Wakefield's ideas and the Swan River Colony to illustrate a point about the necessity of a dependent workforce for capitalist production and colonisation.

== See also ==
- General view of the botany of the vicinity of Swan River, an 1831 scientific paper by Scottish botanist Robert Brown
- History of Perth, Western Australia
- History of Western Australia
- Convict era of Western Australia
