= Electoral results for the district of Greenough =

Western Australian district election results

This is a list of electoral results for the Electoral district of Greenough in Western Australian elections.

== Members for Greenough ==
Member	Party	Term
William Traylen	Opposition	1890–1897
Richard Pennefather	Independent Ministerial	1897–1901
Patrick Stone	Independent	1901–1904
John Nanson	Ministerial	1904–1905
Patrick Stone	Ministerial	1905–1908
John Nanson	Ministerial	1908–1914
John Cunningham	Country	1914–1917
Henry Maley	Country	1917–1924
Maurice Kennedy	Labor	1924–1930
William Patrick	Country	1930–1943
John Newton	Labor	1943–1945
David Brand	Liberal	1945–1949
David Brand	Liberal Country League	1949–1968
David Brand	Liberal	1968–1975
Reg Tubby	Liberal	1975–1989
Kevin Minson	Liberal	1989–2001
Jamie Edwards	Liberal	2001–2005
Grant Woodhams	National	2005–2008

== Election results ==
=== Elections in the 2000s ===
2005 Western Australian state election: Greenough
Party	Candidate	Votes	%	±%
Liberal	Jamie Edwards	4,400	38.7	+2.9
National	Grant Woodhams	2,967	26.1	+15.4
Labor	John Hart	2,599	22.9	+3.5
Greens	Tonya Jensen	546	4.8	+4.6
One Nation	Pauline Anderson	535	4.7	−23.1
Christian Democrats	Steve Fletcher	309	2.7	+2.7
Total formal votes		11,356	95.7	−1.3
Informal votes		515	4.3	+1.3
Turnout		11,871	88.5	
Two-party-preferred result
National	Grant Woodhams	7,717	68.6	+7.9
Labor	John Hart	3,540	31.4	−7.9
Two-candidate-preferred result
National	Grant Woodhams	5,742	51.3	+51.3
Liberal	Jamie Edwards	5,460	48.7	−11.9
National gain from Liberal		Swing	N/A	

2001 Western Australian state election: Greenough
Party	Candidate	Votes	%	±%
Liberal	Jamie Edwards	4,439	35.4	−36.7
One Nation	Pam McCagh	3,455	27.5	+27.5
Labor	Michelle Bone	2,589	20.6	−7.3
National	Kevin Altham	1,279	10.2	+10.2
Independent	David Whitehead	783	6.2	+6.2
Total formal votes		12,545	96.9	0.0
Informal votes		405	3.1	0.0
Turnout		12,950	90.3	
Two-party-preferred result
Liberal	Jamie Edwards	7,322	59.4	−12.7
Labor	Michelle Bone	5,008	40.6	+12.7
Two-candidate-preferred result
Liberal	Jamie Edwards	7,367	59.3	−12.8
One Nation	Pam McCagh	5,057	40.7	+40.7
Liberal hold		Swing	−12.8	

=== Elections in the 1990s ===
1996 Western Australian state election: Greenough
Party	Candidate	Votes	%	±%
Liberal	Kevin Minson	8,202	72.1	+15.7
Labor	Carl Reynolds	3,172	27.9	+2.7
Total formal votes		11,374	96.9	+0.3
Informal votes		367	3.1	−0.3
Turnout		11,741	90.1	
Liberal hold		Swing	+0.4	

1993 Western Australian state election: Greenough
Party	Candidate	Votes	%	±%
Liberal	Kevin Minson	6,805	57.8	+3.4
Labor	John Beenham	2,833	24.1	−2.0
National	Glenys McDonald	2,126	18.1	−1.5
Total formal votes		11,764	96.5	+2.0
Informal votes		421	3.5	−2.0
Turnout		12,185	94.5	+2.9
Two-party-preferred result
Liberal	Kevin Minson	8,582	72.9	+1.6
Labor	John Beenham	3,182	27.1	−1.6
Liberal hold		Swing	+1.6	

=== Elections in the 1980s ===
1989 Western Australian state election: Greenough
Party	Candidate	Votes	%	±%
Liberal	Kevin Minson	5,416	54.4	−19.4
Labor	Frank O'Loughlin	2,599	26.1	+0.4
National	John Hutchinson	1,948	19.5	+18.0
Total formal votes		9,963	94.5	
Informal votes		580	5.5	
Turnout		10,543	91.6	
Two-party-preferred result
Liberal	Kevin Minson	7,102	71.3	−2.6
Labor	Frank O'Loughlin	2,861	28.7	+2.6
Liberal hold		Swing	−2.6	

1986 Western Australian state election: Greenough
Party	Candidate	Votes	%	±%
Liberal	Reg Tubby	6,714	73.6	+2.8
Labor	David Ridley	2,410	26.4	−2.8
Total formal votes		9,124	97.4	+0.1
Informal votes		244	2.6	−0.1
Turnout		9,368	91.5	+1.6
Liberal hold		Swing	+2.8	

1983 Western Australian state election: Greenough
Party	Candidate	Votes	%	±%
Liberal	Reg Tubby	5,345	70.8	
Labor	Timothy Gamage	2,206	29.2	
Total formal votes		7,551	97.3	
Informal votes		207	2.7	
Turnout		7,758	89.9	
Liberal hold		Swing		

1980 Western Australian state election: Greenough
Party	Candidate	Votes	%	±%
Liberal	Reg Tubby	4,429	54.6	−10.0
National Country	Gordon Garratt	1,508	18.6	+18.6
Labor	Edward Clarkson	1,321	16.3	−2.3
National	Michael Bell	589	7.3	+7.3
Progress	William Thomson	262	3.2	−13.6
Total formal votes		8,109	96.9	−0.7
Informal votes		259	3.1	+0.7
Turnout		8,368	90.5	−2.1
Two-party-preferred result
Liberal	Reg Tubby	6,440	79.4	+2.2
Labor	Edward Clarkson	1,669	20.6	−2.2
Liberal hold		Swing	+2.2	

=== Elections in the 1970s ===
1977 Western Australian state election: Greenough
Party	Candidate	Votes	%	±%
Liberal	Reg Tubby	4,965	64.6	
Labor	Kenneth Davis	1,432	18.6	
Progress	Geoffrey McNeil	1,293	16.8	
Total formal votes		7,690	97.6	
Informal votes		190	2.4	
Turnout		7,880	92.6	
Two-party-preferred result
Liberal	Reg Tubby	5,935	77.2	−0.6
Labor	Kenneth Davis	1,755	22.8	+0.6
Liberal hold		Swing	−0.6	

1975 Greenough state by-election
Party	Candidate	Votes	%	±%
Liberal	Reginald Tubby	2,851	45.2	–33.6
National Country	Reginald Thompson	1,715	27.2	+27.2
Labor	Frederick Newman	860	13.6	–7.6
Workers	Geoffrey McNeil	818	13.0	+13.0
Independent	James Croasdale	68	1.1	+1.1
Total formal votes		6,312	98.4	+0.9
Informal votes		192	1.6	–0.9
Turnout		6,414	86.2	–3.3
Two-candidate-preferred result
Liberal	Reginald Tubby	3,617	57.3	N/A
National Country	Reginald Thompson	2,695	42.7	N/A
Liberal hold		Swing	N/A	

1974 Western Australian state election: Greenough
Party	Candidate	Votes	%	±%
Liberal	David Brand	4,999	78.8	
Labor	Frederic Newman	1,343	21.2	
Total formal votes		6,342	97.3	
Informal votes		176	2.7	
Turnout		6,518	89.5	
Liberal hold		Swing		

1971 Western Australian state election: Greenough
Party	Candidate	Votes	%	±%
Liberal	David Brand	3,321	52.6	−47.4
Labor	Fredric Newman	1,687	26.7	+26.7
Independent	Leonard Hamersley	753	11.9	+11.9
Democratic Labor	John Wade	556	8.8	+8.8
Total formal votes		6,317	96.1	
Informal votes		258	3.9	
Turnout		6,575	91.2	
Two-party-preferred result
Liberal	David Brand	4,321	68.4	−31.6
Labor	Fredric Newman	1,996	31.6	+31.6
Liberal hold		Swing	N/A	

=== Elections in the 1960s ===
1968 Western Australian state election: Greenough
Party	Candidate	Votes	%	±%
Liberal and Country	David Brand	unopposed		
Liberal and Country hold		Swing		

1965 Western Australian state election: Greenough
Party	Candidate	Votes	%	±%
Liberal and Country	David Brand	unopposed		
Liberal and Country hold		Swing		

1962 Western Australian state election: Greenough
Party	Candidate	Votes	%	±%
Liberal and Country	David Brand	4,188	95.4	
Communist	John Gandini	202	4.6	
Total formal votes		4,390	96.5	
Informal votes		160	3.5	
Turnout		4,550	90.1	
Liberal and Country hold		Swing		

=== Elections in the 1950s ===
1959 Western Australian state election: Greenough
Party	Candidate	Votes	%	±%
Liberal and Country	David Brand	unopposed		
Liberal and Country hold		Swing		

1956 Western Australian state election: Greenough
Party	Candidate	Votes	%	±%
Liberal and Country	David Brand	unopposed		
Liberal and Country hold		Swing		

1953 Western Australian state election: Greenough
Party	Candidate	Votes	%	±%
Liberal and Country	David Brand	2,691	65.5	−34.5
Labor	James Clune	1,414	34.5	+34.5
Total formal votes		4,105	98.6	
Informal votes		60	1.4	
Turnout		4,165	91.4	
Liberal and Country hold		Swing		

1950 Western Australian state election: Greenough
Party	Candidate	Votes	%	±%
Liberal and Country	David Brand	unopposed		
Liberal and Country hold		Swing		

=== Elections in the 1940s ===
1947 Western Australian state election: Greenough
Party	Candidate	Votes	%	±%
Liberal	David Brand	2,601	66.9	+66.9
Labor	Thomas Shanahan	1,286	33.1	−19.7
Total formal votes		3,887	99.1	+0.5
Informal votes		34	0.9	−0.5
Turnout		3,921	82.6	+1.7
Liberal gain from Labor		Swing	+19.7	

- The Liberal candidate David Brand had won the seat from Labor at the 1945 Greenough state by-election.

1945 Greenough state by-election
Party	Candidate	Votes	%	±%
Labor	Edward Newton	1,508	41.8	−11.0
Liberal	David Brand	1,227	34.0	+34.0
Country	Francis Horwood	869	24.1	−23.1
Total formal votes		3,604	99.0	+0.4
Informal votes		37	1.0	−0.4
Turnout		3,641	76.9	−4.0
Two-party-preferred result
Liberal	David Brand	1,956	54.3	+54.3
Labor	Edward Newton	1,648	45.7	−7.1
Liberal gain from Labor		Swing	N/A	

1943 Western Australian state election: Greenough
Party	Candidate	Votes	%	±%
Labor	John Newton	1,944	52.8	+52.8
Country	William Patrick	1,737	47.2	−52.8
Total formal votes		3,681	98.6	
Informal votes		52	1.4	
Turnout		3,733	80.9	
Labor gain from Country		Swing	N/A	

=== Elections in the 1930s ===
1939 Western Australian state election: Greenough
Party	Candidate	Votes	%	±%
Country	William Patrick	unopposed		
Country hold		Swing		

1936 Western Australian state election: Greenough
Party	Candidate	Votes	%	±%
Country	William Patrick	1,727	51.4	+13.3
Independent Labor	John Garland	1,356	40.3	+40.3
Independent	Henry Carson	279	8.3	+8.3
Total formal votes		3,362	99.1	+0.7
Informal votes		32	0.9	−0.7
Turnout		3,394	61.7	−21.8
Country hold		Swing	N/A	

- Preferences were not distributed.

1933 Western Australian state election: Greenough
Party	Candidate	Votes	%	±%
Labor	John Steele	1,844	38.1	0.0
Country	William Patrick	1,428	29.5	−5.1
Country	Kenneth Jones	965	19.9	+19.9
Independent Country	Paul McGuiness	599	12.4	+12.4
Total formal votes		4,836	98.4	−0.6
Informal votes		76	1.6	+0.6
Turnout		4,912	83.5	+15.2
Two-party-preferred result
Country	William Patrick	2,648	54.8	−0.2
Labor	John Steele	2,188	45.2	+0.2
Country hold		Swing	−0.2	

1930 Western Australian state election: Greenough
Party	Candidate	Votes	%	±%
Labor	Maurice Kennedy	1,498	38.1	
Country	William Patrick	1,361	34.6	
Independent	Henry Maley	1,076	27.3	
Total formal votes		3,935	99.0	
Informal votes		40	1.0	
Turnout		3,975	68.3	
Two-party-preferred result
Country	William Patrick	2,164	55.0	
Labor	Maurice Kennedy	1,771	45.0	
Country gain from Labor		Swing		

=== Elections in the 1920s ===
1927 Western Australian state election: Greenough
Party	Candidate	Votes	%	±%
Labor	Maurice Kennedy	1,191	47.7	+3.6
Country	Charles Smith	661	26.5	+6.7
Nationalist	Henry Maley	646	25.9	−10.2
Total formal votes		2,498	98.4	−0.7
Informal votes		40	1.6	+0.7
Turnout		2,538	80.9	+13.8
Two-party-preferred result
Labor	Maurice Kennedy	1,290	51.6	+1.0
Country	Charles Smith	1,208	48.4	−1.0
Labor hold		Swing	+1.0	

1924 Western Australian state election: Greenough
Party	Candidate	Votes	%	±%
Labor	Maurice Kennedy	861	44.1	+6.0
Country	Henry Maley	705	36.1	−25.8
Executive Country	William Patrick	387	19.8	+19.8
Total formal votes		1,953	99.1	−0.3
Informal votes		17	0.9	+0.3
Turnout		1,970	67.1	−2.3
Two-party-preferred result
Labor	Maurice Kennedy	989	50.6	+12.5
Country	Henry Maley	964	49.4	−12.5
Labor gain from Country		Swing	+12.5	

1921 Western Australian state election: Greenough
Party	Candidate	Votes	%	±%
Country	Henry Maley	968	61.9	+38.4
Labor	Patrick Moy	595	38.1	+4.3
Total formal votes		1,563	99.4	+2.6
Informal votes		10	0.6	−2.6
Turnout		1,573	69.4	+8.3
Country hold		Swing	+4.1	

=== Elections in the 1910s ===
1917 Western Australian state election: Greenough
Party	Candidate	Votes	%	±%
Labor	Patrick Moy	499	33.8	+33.8
National Country	John Cunningham	390	26.4	–50.6
National Country	Henry Maley	347	23.5	+23.5
Nationalist	Sydney Hosken	242	16.4	+16.4
Total formal votes		1,478	96.9	–1.9
Informal votes		48	3.1	+1.9
Turnout		1,526	61.1	+24.2
Two-party-preferred result
National Country	Henry Maley	854	57.8	+57.8
Labor	Patrick Moy	624	42.2	+42.2
National Country hold		Swing	N/A	

1914 Western Australian state election: Greenough
Party	Candidate	Votes	%	±%
Country	John Cunningham	986	77.0	+77.0
Liberal	Ernest Udy	294	23.0	−28.0
Total formal votes		1,280	98.8	−0.6
Informal votes		16	1.2	+0.6
Turnout		1,296	36.9	−33.6
Country gain from Liberal		Swing	N/A	

1911 Western Australian state election: Greenough
Party	Candidate	Votes	%	±%
Ministerialist	John Nanson	721	51.0	
Labor	Sydney Hosken	693	49.0	
Total formal votes		1,414	99.4	
Informal votes		9	0.6	
Turnout		1,423	70.5	
Ministerialist hold		Swing		

=== Elections in the 1900s ===
1908 Western Australian state election: Greenough
Party	Candidate	Votes	%	±%
Ministerialist	John Nanson	567	62.4	+62.4
Ministerialist	Patrick Stone	342	37.6	−7.4
Total formal votes		909	98.4	−0.2
Informal votes		15	1.6	+0.2
Turnout		924	58.4	+2.9
Ministerialist hold		Swing	N/A	

1905 Western Australian state election: Greenough
Party	Candidate	Votes	%	±%
Ind. Ministerialist	Patrick Stone	314	45.0	+14.4
Ministerialist	Edward Harney	235	33.7	+33.7
Ministerialist	Henry Maley	149	21.4	+21.4
Total formal votes		698	98.6	+0.4
Informal votes		10	1.4	–0.4
Turnout		708	55.5	–6.7
Ind. Ministerialist gain from Ministerialist		Swing	+14.4	

1904 Western Australian state election: Greenough
Party	Candidate	Votes	%	±%
Ministerialist	John Nanson	289	35.0	+35.0
Independent	Patrick Stone	211	25.6	–9.9
Independent	Samuel Mitchell	181	21.9	+21.9
Independent	Richard Pennefather	144	17.5	+17.5
Total formal votes		825	98.2	+0.1
Informal votes		15	1.8	–0.1
Turnout		839	62.2	–5.0
Ministerialist hold		Swing	N/A	

1901 Western Australian state election: Greenough
Party	Candidate	Votes	%	±%
Ministerialist	Patrick Stone	113	35.5	+35.5
Ministerialist	John Morrell	102	32.1	+32.1
Ministerialist	Joseph Dreyer	80	25.2	+25.2
Opposition	Charles Cheeseborough	23	7.2	+7.2
Total formal votes		318	98.1	+0.2
Informal votes		6	1.9	–0.2
Turnout		324	67.2	–11.1
Ministerialist hold		Swing	N/A	

=== Elections in the 1890s ===
1897 Western Australian colonial election: Greenough
Party	Candidate	Votes	%	±%
Ind. Ministerialist	Richard Pennefather	73	52.9	
Ministerialist	William Traylen	41	29.7	
Ministerialist	Major Logue	24	17.4	
Total formal votes		138	97.9	
Informal votes		3	2.1	
Turnout		141	78.3	
Ind. Ministerialist gain from Ministerialist		Swing		

1894 Western Australian colonial election: Greenough
Party	Candidate	Votes	%	±%
None	William Traylen	56	50.5	–49.5
None	Major Logue	55	49.5	+49.5

1890 Western Australian colonial election: Greenough
Party	Candidate	Votes	%	±%
None	William Traylen	unopposed		
