= Horrocks =

Horrocks or Horrox may refer to

== People ==
- Amy Horrocks (1867 – 1919), English music educator, pianist and composer
- Brian Horrocks (1895–1985), British Army lieutenant-general in the Second World War
- Chris Horrocks (soccer) (born 1954), Canadian former international and North American Soccer League player
- Chris Horrocks (writer), associate professor of art history and author
- Dylan Horrocks (born 1966), New Zealand cartoonist
- Geoffrey Horrocks (mathematician) (1932/33 – 2012), British mathematician
- Geoffrey Horrocks (philologist) (born 1951), British philologist
- Ian Horrocks (born 1958), British professor of computer science at the University of Oxford
- Ian Horrocks (RAF officer) (died 2014), British Royal Air Force pilot and air commodore
- James Horrocks (died 1772), American Anglican clergyman and sixth president of the College of William and Mary
- Jane Horrocks (born 1964), British comedian and actress
- Jeremiah Horrocks or Horrox (1618–1641), English astronomer
- John Horrocks (cotton manufacturer) (1768–1804), British cotton manufacturer
- John Horrocks (fisherman) (1816–1881), Scottish founder and innovator of modern European fly fishing
- John Ainsworth Horrocks, (1818–1846), English-born explorer and settler in South Australia
- Joseph Horrocks (1803–1866), British convict transported to Western Australia
- Mark Horrocks (born 1977), English former cricketer
- Nancy Horrocks (1900–1989), British artist
- Norman Horrocks (1927–2010), professor emeritus and adjunct professor at the School of Information Management, Dalhousie University, Nova Scotia, Canada
- Peter Horrocks (born 1959), British television producer
- Ray Horrocks (1930–2011), British automobile chief executive (BL), in the 1980s
- Richard Horrocks (1857–1926), English cricketer
- Rosemary Horrox (born 1951), English historian
- Vic Horrocks (1884–1922), English footballer
- William Horrocks (1859–1941), British military doctor
- William Horrocks (cricketer) (1905–1985), English cricketer

== Places ==
- Horrocks, Western Australia, a small town
- Horrocks Pass, a pass in the southern Flinders Ranges in South Australia
- Horrocks Block, a mostly sandstone outcrop on Alexander Island, Antarctica
- Horrocks (crater), a lunar crater named after Jeremiah Horrocks

== Other uses ==
- Tony Horrocks, a fictional character on the soap opera Coronation Street
- Horrocks Highway, a section of the Main North Road, Adelaide, South Australia

== See also ==
- Horrocks loom, a type of power loom used to weave cotton
