= 1975 Greenough state by-election =

A by-election for the seat of Greenough in the Legislative Assembly of Western Australia was held on 1 November 1975. It was triggered by the resignation of Sir David Brand (the sitting Liberal member and a former premier) on 21 August 1975. The Liberal Party retained Greenough at the by-election, with its candidate, Reg Tubby, winning 57.3 percent of the two-candidate-preferred (2CP) vote. However, the party suffered a swing of 33.6 points on first preferences, in part due to the entry of two parties that had not stood in Greenough at the 1974 state election (the National Country Party and the Workers Party). The Workers Party was in fact making its electoral debut, and surprised most observers by polling 13 percent on first preferences (only 62 votes fewer than the Labor Party).

== Background ==
David Brand had held Greenough for the Liberal Party since a 1945 by-election. He was party leader from 1957 to 1973 and premier from 1959 to 1971, setting records for length of service in both positions. Brand resigned from parliament on 21 August 1975. The writ for the by-election was issued on 25 August, with the close of nominations on 8 October. Polling day was on 1 November, with the writ returned on 21 November.

The by-election occurred in the final days of the 1975 Australian constitutional crisis, which culminated with the dismissal of Prime Minister Gough Whitlam (an unpopular figure in Western Australia) on 11 November. Earlier in the year, there had also been political turmoil at state level, with the National Country Party withdrawing from its governing coalition with the Liberal Party for eleven days.

== Results ==
Greenough state by-election, 1975
Party	Candidate	Votes	%	±%
Liberal	Reginald Tubby	2,851	45.2	–33.6
National Country	Reginald Thompson	1,715	27.2	+27.2
Labor	Frederick Newman	860	13.6	–7.6
Workers	Geoffrey McNeil	818	13.0	+13.0
Independent	James Croasdale	68	1.1	+1.1
Total formal votes		6,312	98.4	+0.9
Informal votes		192	1.6	–0.9
Turnout		6,414	86.2	–3.3
Two-candidate-preferred result
Liberal	Reginald Tubby	3,617	57.3	N/A
National Country	Reginald Thompson	2,695	42.7	N/A
Liberal hold		Swing	N/A	

== Aftermath ==
Tubby held Greenough until his retirement at the 1989 state election. The National Country Party (later renamed the National Party) did not better its result at the by-election until the 2005 state election, when Grant Woodhams won Greenough for the party for the first time since 1943 (when William Patrick was defeated).

== See also ==
- List of Western Australian state by-elections
