= 1945 Greenough state by-election =

1945 by-election in Western Australia

- 27 October 1945
	First party	Second party	Third party
Candidate	David Brand	Cecil Newton	Francis Horwood
Party	Liberal	Labor	Country and Democratic League
Popular vote	1,227	1,508	869
Percentage	34.0	41.8	24.1
Swing	+34.0	−11.0	−23.1
TCP	1,956 (54.3%)	1,648 (45.7%)

The 1945 Greenough state by-election was a by-election held on 27 October 1945 for the Greenough seat in the Western Australian Legislative Assembly. The by-election was triggered by the presumed death of the sitting Labor member John Verdun Newton, who was reported missing on air operations over Germany in January 1944. The seat was won by the Liberal candidate David Brand, who later served as Premier of Western Australia from 1959 to 1971. The by-election was the first time the new Liberal Party had contested a rural seat.

== Background ==
The electoral district of Greenough was a rural electorate covering the farming districts around Geraldton, including the towns of Dongara, Mingenew, Mullewa, Morawa and Three Springs.

William Patrick had held Greenough for the Country Party since 1930, but lost the seat to Labor's John Verdun Newton at the 1943 state election by 1,944 votes to 1,737. Newton was serving overseas with the Royal Australian Air Force at the time and never took his seat. He was reported missing during a raid on Brunswick, Germany, on 14 January 1944.

By February 1945 the Department of Air had advised the state government that Newton was presumed dead. However, under the Constitution a by-election could only be held once two members of the Assembly had notified the Speaker of a member's death, so the seat could not be filled straight away. Greenough was declared vacant on 27 September 1945, after a panel of members had inquired into whether a vacancy existed. Nominations closed on 8 October, with polling on 27 October.

== Candidates ==
David Brand, a returned soldier and storekeeper from Dongara, was endorsed by the Liberal Party in June 1945. The by-election was the first time the new party had contested a rural seat.

Labor chose Newton's elder brother, Cecil Newton, a farmer at Mingenew and a member of the local road board.

Francis Horwood was the candidate of the Country and Democratic League.

== Results ==
Newton led on first preferences with 41.8 per cent of the vote, ahead of Brand on 34.0 per cent and Horwood on 24.1 per cent. Most of Horwood's preferences went to Brand, who won the seat by 308 votes.

Party	Candidate	Votes	%	±%
Labor	Cecil Newton	1,508	41.8	−11.0
Liberal	David Brand	1,227	34.0	+34.0
Country and Democratic League	Francis Horwood	869	24.1	−23.1
Total formal votes		3,604	99.0	
Informal votes		37	1.0	
Turnout		3,641	76.9	
Two-candidate-preferred result
Liberal	David Brand	1,956	54.3	+54.3
Labor	Cecil Newton	1,648	45.7	−7.1
Liberal gain from Labor

Swings are calculated against the 1943 state election. Turnout is based on an enrolment of 4,736.

== Aftermath ==
Brand was sworn in on 13 November 1945.

Brand was Premier from 1959 to 1971, the longest term of any Western Australian premier. He held Greenough until his resignation in 1975, which led to the 1975 Greenough state by-election.

== See also ==
- Electoral district of Greenough
- Electoral results for the district of Greenough
- John Verdun Newton
- David Brand
- 1975 Greenough state by-election
- List of Western Australian state by-elections
