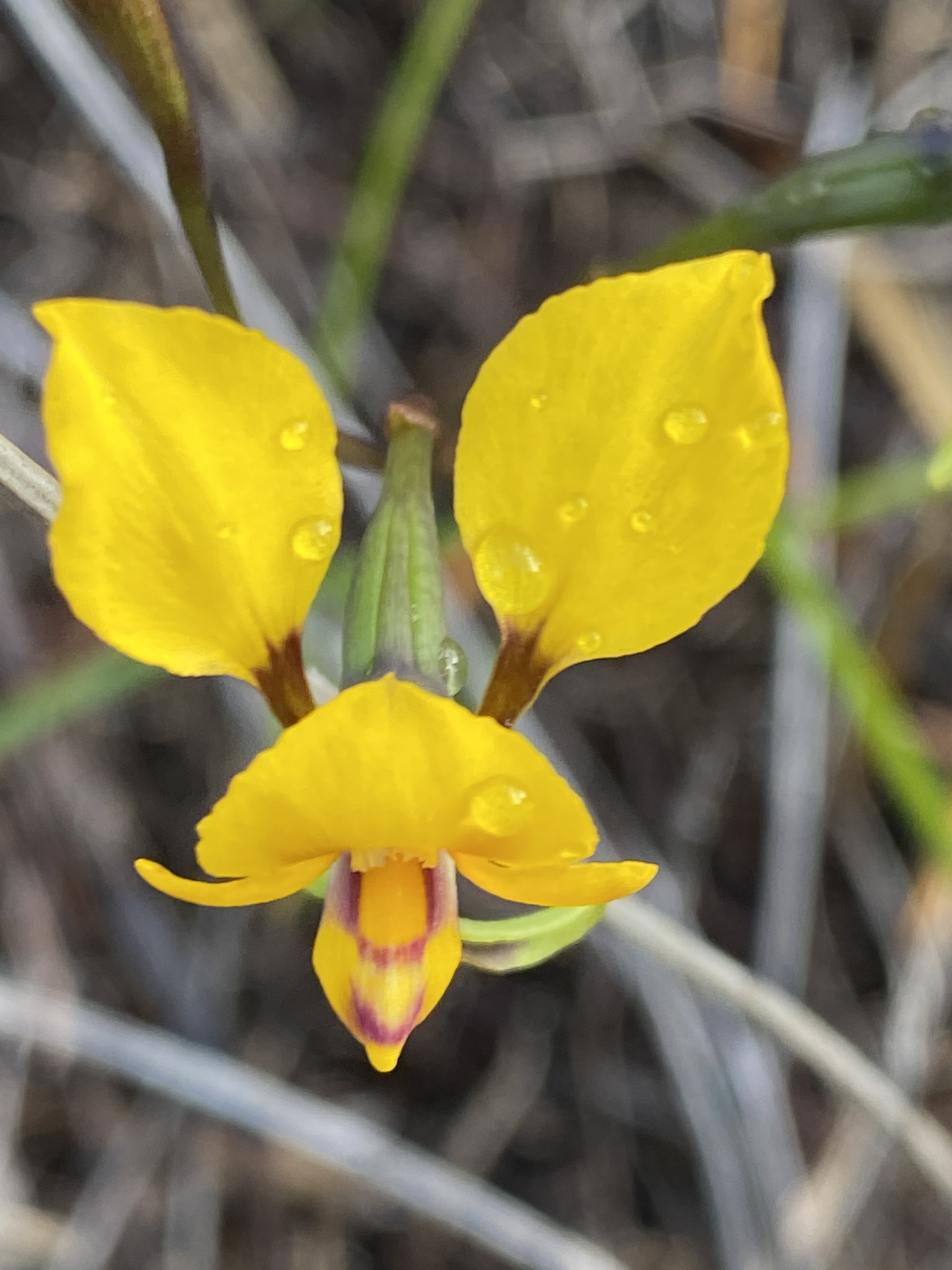
- In Kalbarri National Park

Scientific classification
- Kingdom: Plantae
- Clade: Tracheophytes
- Clade: Angiosperms
- Clade: Monocots
- Order: Asparagales
- Family: Orchidaceae
- Subfamily: Orchidoideae
- Tribe: Diurideae
- Genus: Diuris
- Species: D. carecta

Binomial name
- Diuris carecta D.L.Jones & C.J.French

Synonyms
- Diuris sp. 'Murchison River'

= Diuris carecta =

Sedge-loving donkey orchid

Species of orchid

Diuris carecta, commonly known as sedge-loving donkey orchid, is a species of orchid that is endemic to the west of Western Australia. It has two or three linear leaves and a tall flowering stem with up to six yellow and brown flowers with strongly curved lateral sepals.

== Description ==
Diuris carecta is a tuberous, perennial herb, usually growing to a height of 250–450 mm (9.8–17.7 in) with two or three linear leaves 150–250 mm (5.9–9.8 in) long and 6–14 mm (0.24–0.55 in) wide. There are up to six yellow and brown or reddish-brown flowers, 20–30 mm (0.79–1.18 in) wide on pedicels 20–40 mm (0.79–1.57 in) long. The flowers have erect, ear-like petals 15–20 mm (0.59–0.79 in) long, a dorsal sepal 8–12 mm (0.31–0.47 in) long and 10–16 mm (0.39–0.63 in) wide, and lateral sepals 13–18 mm (0.51–0.71 in) long that are strongly curved backwards and often crossed. The labellum has three lobes, the lateral ones egg-shaped, 8–10 mm (0.31–0.39 in) long and 4–6 mm (0.16–0.24 in) wide, and the middle lobe convex with a single yellow callus. Flowering occurs from late August to early October.

== Taxonomy and naming ==
Diuris carecta was first formally described in 2016 by David Jones and Christopher French in Australian Orchid Review from specimens French collected near Binnu in 2004. The specific epithet (carecta) means "a sedgy place ", referring to the habitat preference of the species.

== Distribution and habitat ==
Sedge-loving donkey orchid grows in moist shrubland and woodland among sedges between the rabbit-proof fence near the Murchison River, the East Yuna Nature Reserve and Binnu, in the Avon Wheatbelt, Geraldton Sandplains and Yalgoo bioregions of western Western Australia.

== Conservation ==
Diuris carecta is listed as "not threatened" by the Western Australian Government Department of Biodiversity, Conservation and Attractions.
