= Chris Horrocks =

Chris Horrocks may refer to:

- Chris Horrocks (soccer) (born 1954), former Canadian international and North American Soccer League player
- Chris Horrocks (writer), associate professor of art history and author
