= John Horrocks =

John Horrocks may refer to:

- John Horrocks (politician) (1768–1804), British cotton manufacturer and Member of Parliament
- John Horrocks (fisherman) (1816–1881), Edinburgh-born founder of modern fly fishing in Europe
- John Ainsworth Horrocks (1818–1846), South Australian explorer
- John Horrocks (footballer) (1887-1957), English footballer for Stockport County, Nottingham Forest and Bury see List of Bury F.C. players (1–24 appearances)
- John Horrocks (died 2001), a member of English band Poloroid
