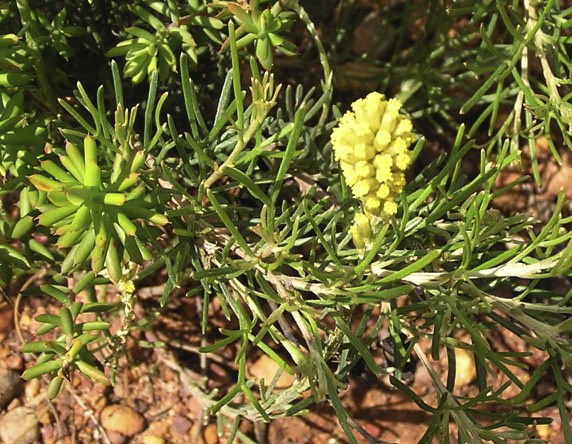
- In Sandy Gully

Scientific classification
- Kingdom: Plantae
- Clade: Tracheophytes
- Clade: Angiosperms
- Clade: Eudicots
- Order: Proteales
- Family: Proteaceae
- Genus: Petrophile
- Species: P. conifera

Binomial name
- Petrophile conifera Meisn.

Synonyms
- Petrophila conifera Meisn. orth. var.

= Petrophile conifera =

Species of shrub endemic to Western Australia

Petrophile conifera is a species of flowering plant in the family Proteaceae and is endemic to the south-west of Western Australia. It is a bushy, much-branched shrub with pinnate, sharply-pointed leaves, and oval heads of hairy, cream-coloured to yellowish white flowers.

== Description ==
Petrophile conifera is a bushy, much-branched shrub that typically grows to a height of 0.3–1.5 m (1 ft 0 in – 4 ft 11 in) and has woolly-hairy young branchlets. The leaves are glabrous, 40–110 mm (1.6–4.3 in) long on a petiole 20–50 mm (0.79–1.97 in) long. They are rigid and needle-like, pinnately divided with sharply-pointed pinnae 4–35 mm (0.16–1.38 in) long. The flowers are arranged on the ends of branchlets in sessile, oval heads 20–30 mm (0.79–1.18 in) long, with hairy, lance-shaped involucral bracts at the base. The flowers are 8–15 mm (0.31–0.59 in) long, hairy, cream-coloured, creamy yellow or yellowish white. Flowering occurs from August to October and the fruit is a nut, fused with others in an oval head 10–30 mm (0.39–1.18 in) long.

== Taxonomy ==
Petrophile conifera was first formally described in 1855 by Carl Meissner in Hooker's Journal of Botany and Kew Garden Miscellany from material collected by James Drummond. The specific epithet (conifera) means "cone-bearing".

In 2011, Michael Clyde Hislop and Kelly Anne Shepherd described two subspecies in the journal Nuytsia and the names are accepted by the Australian Plant Census:

- Petrophile conifera Meisn. subsp. conifera has petioles 20–48 mm (0.79–1.89 in) long and involucral bracts 0.9–2.2 mm (0.035–0.087 in) wide;
- Petrophile conifera subsp. divaricata B.L.Rye & K.A.Sheph. has petioles 12–24 mm (0.47–0.94 in) long and involucral bracts 2.5–4.1 mm (0.098–0.161 in) wide.

== Distribution and habitat ==
This petrophile grows in heath and on sandplains and is common north of Geraldton in the Avon Wheatbelt and Geraldton Sandplains biogeographic regions of southwestern Western Australia. Subspecies conifera is found from Eurardy Reserve and Kalbarri National Park to the Chapman River near Geraldton and subsp. divaricata only occurs near Coorow.

== Conservation status ==
Petrophile conifera subsp. conifera is classified as "not threatened" but subsp. divaricata is classified as "Priority Two" by the Western Australian Government Department of Parks and Wildlife, meaning that it is poorly known and from only one or a few locations.
