= Henry Maley =

Australian politician

Leader of the Country Party in Western Australia
- In office 30 August 1922 – 20 November 1923
- Deputy: Charles Latham
- Preceded by: Tom Harrison
- Succeeded by: Alec Thomson

Member of the Legislative Assembly of Western Australia
- In office 29 September 1917 – 22 March 1924
- Preceded by: John Cunningham
- Succeeded by: Maurice Kennedy
- Constituency: Greenough
- In office 9 November 1929 – 12 April 1930
- Preceded by: Charles Maley
- Succeeded by: None (seat abolished)
- Constituency: Irwin

Personal details
- Born: 17 June 1878 Greenough, Western Australia
- Died: 26 February 1956 (aged 77) Subiaco, Western Australia
- Party: Country (to 1924); Nationalist (1924–1929); Country (1929–1930)
- Other political affiliations: Independent (1930)

Henry Kennedy Maley (17 June 1878 – 26 February 1956) was an Australian politician who was a Country Party member of the Legislative Assembly of Western Australia from 1917 to 1924 and again from 1929 to 1930. He was the state leader of the Country Party from 1922 to 1923, and a minister in the government of Sir James Mitchell from 1921 to 1924.

== Early life ==
Maley was born in Greenough, Western Australia, to Elizabeth (née Waldeck) and John Stephen Maley. His sister was the activist Mary Martha Farrelly. He attended the High School in Perth on a scholarship, and after leaving began working as a clerk for the Midland Railway Company. After two years, he moved to Kalgoorlie and was employed by a mining syndicate. During the Boer War, Maley served with the West Australian Mounted Infantry. He took over his father's farm in Greenough after the war's end, and also owned land in Three Springs from 1907 to 1913 (in partnership with his brothers). Maley served as secretary of the Greenough Road Board, and was also secretary of the Geraldton branch of the Farmers' and Settlers' Association.

== Politics ==
Maley first stood for parliament at the 1905 state election, running unsuccessfully as a Ministerialist in the seat of Greenough. He recontested Greenough for the Country Party at the 1917 election and was successful, defeating the sitting member, John Cunningham. After the 1921 election, Maley was appointed Minister for Agriculture in the Mitchell government, replacing Hal Colebatch. He was elected to the Country Party leadership in August 1922, following the resignation of Tom Harrison. There were three other candidates, William Pickering, Alec Thomson, and Charles Latham, with Latham subsequently being elected deputy leader.

In 1923, the Country Party split into two factions due to a dispute over the status of the coalition with the Nationalists. Maley supported the coalition, but at the 1924 state election was opposed by William Patrick, a member of the opposing faction. Some of Patrick's supporters directed their preferences to the Labor candidate, Maurice Kennedy, which resulted in Maley losing his seat by a margin of just 25 votes on the two-party-preferred count. Maley recontested Greenough as a Nationalist at the 1927 election, but was unsuccessful.

Charles Maley, Henry's older brother, was also a member of parliament, representing the seat of Irwin. He died in office in October 1929, and at the resulting by-election Henry was elected as his successor. However, the seat of Irwin was abolished prior to the 1930 state election, and merged into the new seat of Irwin-Moore. Maley did not contest Irwin-Moore, but instead ran again in Greenough, as an independent. He failed to make the final two-candidate-preferred count.

== Later life ==
Maley retired to Subiaco, and from 1929 to 1943 served on the Subiaco Municipal Council. He had earlier served on the Rottnest Island board of control from 1923 to 1925. Maley died in Perth in February 1956, aged 77. He had married Mabel Louisa Bateman in 1911, with whom he had three sons.

Parliament of Western Australia
Preceded by John Cunningham	Member for Greenough; 1917–1924	Succeeded by Maurice Kennedy
Preceded by Charles Maley	Member for Irwin; 1929–1930	Abolished
Political offices
Preceded by Hal Colebatch	Minister for Agriculture; 1921–1924	Succeeded by Frank Troy
