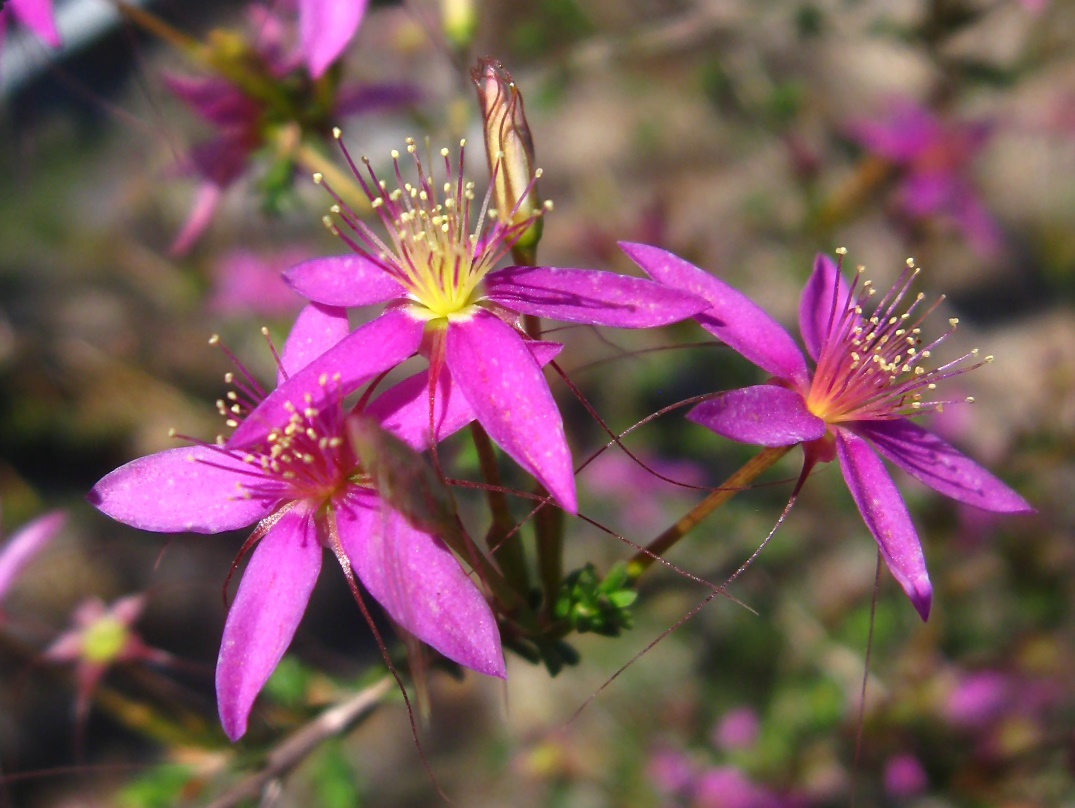
- Flowers

Scientific classification
- Kingdom: Plantae
- Clade: Tracheophytes
- Clade: Angiosperms
- Clade: Eudicots
- Clade: Rosids
- Order: Myrtales
- Family: Myrtaceae
- Genus: Calytrix
- Species: C. fraseri

Binomial name
- Calytrix fraseri A.Cunn.

= Calytrix fraseri =

Species of flowering plant

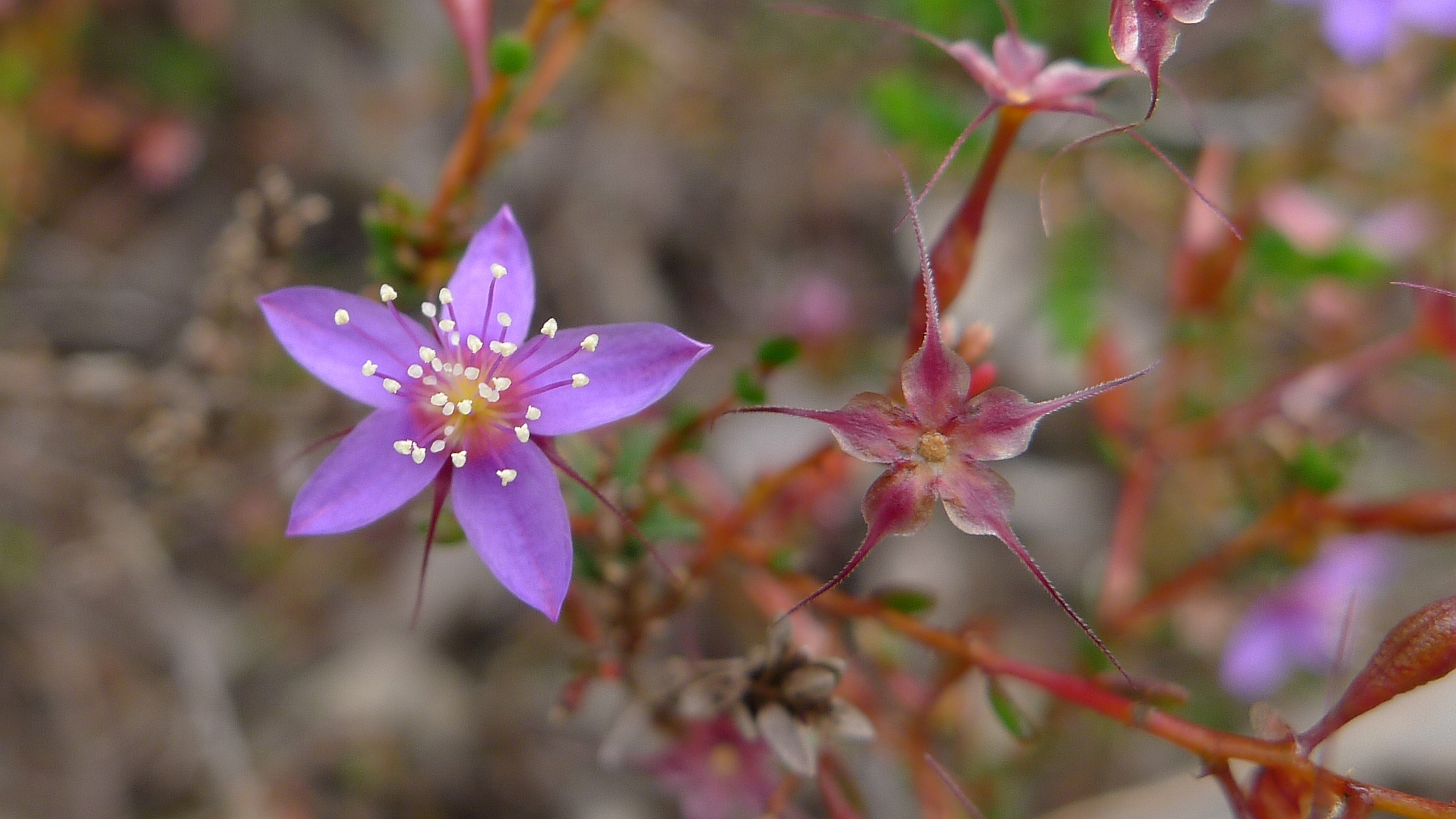
Calytrix fraseri flower with purple colour

Calytrix fraseri, commonly known as pink summer calytrix or pink summer starflower, is a species of flowering plant in the myrtle family Myrtaceae and is endemic to the south-west of Western Australia. It is a shrub with oblong, linear or elliptic leaves with the narrower end towards the base, and pink, cerise or pinkish purple flowers with about 35 to 55 stamens in several rows.

== Description ==
Calytrix fraseri is a mostly glabrous shrub that typically grows to a height of 0.2–1 m (7.9 in – 3 ft 3.4 in), sometimes to 2 m (6 ft 7 in). Its leaves are oblong, linear, broadly elliptic or elliptic with the narrower end towards the base, mostly 0.8–5 mm (0.031–0.197 in) long and 0.8–1.5 mm (0.031–0.059 in) wide and sessile or on a petiole up to 0.5 mm (0.020 in) long. There are stipules up to 0.75 mm (0.030 in) long at the base of the leaves. The flowers are borne on a peduncle 0.5–2.5 mm (0.020–0.098 in) long with oblong to egg-shaped bracteoles 2–4.5 mm (0.079–0.177 in) long. The floral tube is 7–18 mm (0.28–0.71 in) long and has 10 ribs. The sepals are fused at the base for up to 0.75 mm (0.030 in), with elliptic to broadly elliptic lobes 1.0–2.25 mm (0.039–0.089 in) long and 1.5–2.75 mm (0.059–0.108 in) wide, with an awn up to 18 mm (0.71 in) long. The petals are pink, cerise or pinkish purple with a yellow base 6–14 mm (0.24–0.55 in) long and 2.0–5.3 mm (0.079–0.209 in) wide, and there are about 35 to 55 stamens in several rows. Flowering usually occurs between November and August.

== Taxonomy ==
Calytrix fraseri was first formally described in 1834 by the botanist Allan Cunningham in 1834 in the journal Botanical Magazine, from specimens collected by Charles Fraser near the Swan River. The specific epithet (fraseri) honours the collector of the type specimens.

== Distribution and habitat ==
Pink summer calytrix grows on sandplains, coastal dunes and granite outcrops between Horrocks Beach and Bunbury and inland as far as Kondinin in the Avon Wheatbelt, Geraldton Sandplains, Jarrah Forest, Mallee and Swan Coastal Plain bioregions of south-western Western Australia.
