= Greenough Road District =

Former local government area of Western Australia

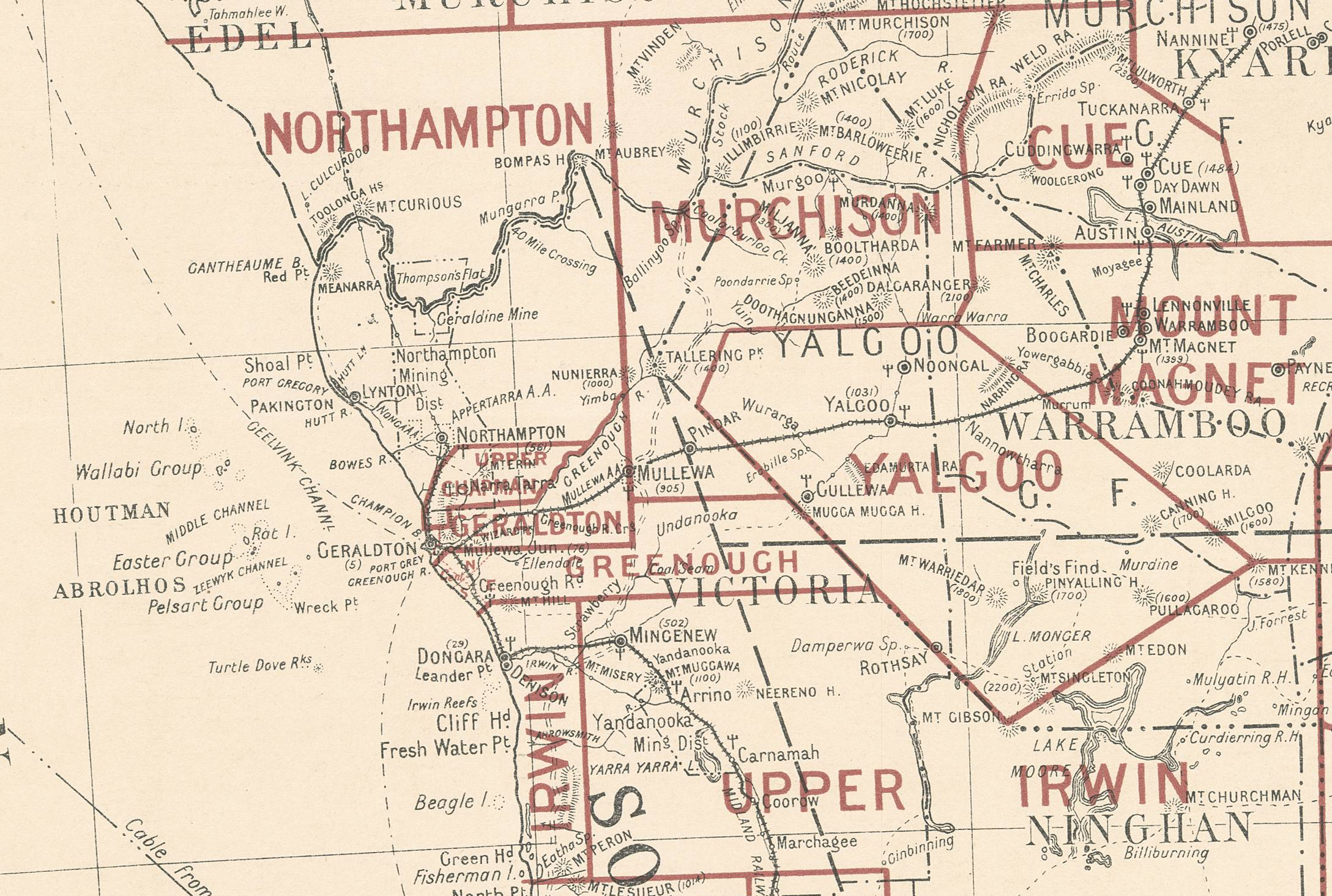
Greenough (at centre) and surrounding road districts, 1905

The Greenough Road District was an early form of local government area in the Mid West region of Western Australia. It was based in the town of Greenough.

It was established on 24 January 1871, and was originally a much larger district, including much of the future Shire of Murchison and Shire of Mullewa areas.

The Murchison Road District was separated from the Greenough district on 3 August 1875 and the Mullewa Road District was separated on 11 August 1911.

The road board built a permanent one-room stone office in Gregory Road, Greenough in 1906; the building survives today and is heritage-listed.

Politicians Patrick Stone, John Stephen Maley and Henry Maley were all associated with the board: J. S. Maley as chairman, Stone as a board member, and future state Country Party leader Henry Maley as board secretary.

It ceased to exist on 21 December 1951, when it amalgamated with the Geraldton Road District to form the Geraldton-Greenough Road District.
