= John Stephen Maley =

John Stephen Maley (5 April 1839 – 28 December 1910) was a pioneering settler of the Mid West region of Western Australia. He was known for his engineering prowess.

== Life ==
Maley was born in Albany, Western Australia, to Martha Mary (née Goodchild) and Kennedy Maley. His parents were both immigrants, his father from Northern Ireland and his mother from Hampshire, England. After leaving school, Maley moved to Perth and became an apprentice to Solomon Cook, an American-born engineer. He helped Cook on a number of projects, including several bridge-building projects, and also worked on Cook's primitive steam ferries on the Swan River. Maley also assisted Richard Jewell with his rebuilding of The Causeway, which was the main river crossing in Perth at the time. He caused a stir at the official opening ceremony in 1867, interrupting the speech of the governor, John Hampton, and galloping over the bridge on horseback in order to be the first across.

Earlier in the 1860s, Maley had been granted land at Greenough, the centre of Western Australia's burgeoning wheat-growing district. He moved to Greenough permanently later in the decade, and had a large two-storey homestead built with the aids of convict labour. Maley engineered the first bridge over the Greenough River, and on the river built a flour mill that supplied Greenough, Northampton, and Geraldton, as well as exporting to England. He was a long-serving member of the Greenough Road Board, and served several terms as chairman. Maley died in Greenough in December 1910, aged 71. He had married Elizabeth Kniest Waldeck in 1862, with whom he had nine sons and five daughters. Two of his sons, Charles and Henry Maley, became members of parliament. His daughter Mary Martha Maley (became Farrelly) was a leading figure and a noted advocate for wholemeal wheat.
