= Shire of Northampton =

Coordinates: 28°21′04″S 114°37′41″E

- Local government area
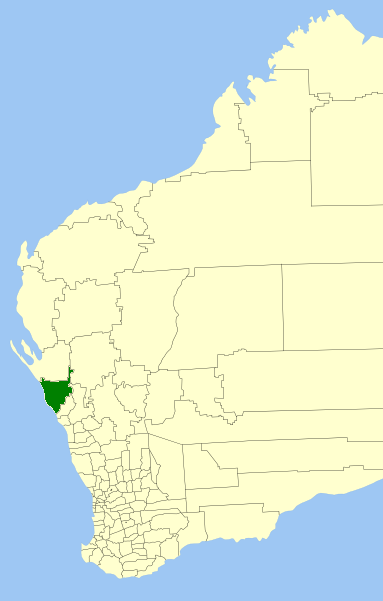
- Location in Western Australia

- Interactive map of Shire of Northampton
- Country: Australia
- State: Western Australia
- Region: Mid West
- Established: 1871
- Council seat: Northampton

Government
  - Shire President: Liz Sudlow
  - State electorate: Geraldton
  - Federal division: Durack

Area
  - Total: 13,737.8 km^{2} (5,304.2 sq mi)

Population
  - Total: 3,227 (LGA 2021)
- Website: Shire of Northampton
LGAs around Shire of Northampton
Indian Ocean	Shark Bay	Murchison
Indian Ocean	Shire of Northampton	Murchison
Indian Ocean	Chapman Valley	Chapman Valley

The Shire of Northampton is a local government area in the Mid West region of Western Australia, about 50 kilometres (30 mi) north of Geraldton and about 460 kilometres (290 mi) north of the state capital, Perth. The Shire covers an area of 13,738 square kilometres (5,304 sq mi), and its seat of government is the town of Northampton, with the largest settlement being Kalbarri.

The shire includes the former Principality of Hutt River, a now dissolved micronation which has no recognition by the state or federal governments.

== History ==
The Mines Road District was constituted on 25 January 1871 under the Road Boards Act 1871. It was renamed the Northampton Road District on 10 February 1887. On 1 July 1961, it became a shire following the passage of the Local Government Act 1960, which reformed all remaining road districts into shires.

== Wards ==
The Shire is divided into six wards, most of which elect one councillor:

- Kalbarri Ward (four councillors)
- Central Ward (three councillors)
- Coastal Ward
- North East Ward
- South East Ward
- West Ward

Prior to May 2003, the Coastal Ward was known as the Horrocks Ward, the Kalbarri Ward had three councillors and all the others had two councillors.

== Towns and localities ==
The towns and localities of the Shire of Northampton with population and size figures based on the most recent Australian census:

Locality	Population	Area	Map
Ajana	51 (SAL 2021)	728.2 km^{2} (281.2 sq mi)	
Alma	116 (SAL 2021)	342.2 km^{2} (132.1 sq mi)	
Binnu	58 (SAL 2021)	756.2 km^{2} (292.0 sq mi)	
Bowes	104 (SAL 2021)	222.8 km^{2} (86.0 sq mi)	
Coolcalalaya	11 (SAL 2021)	3,103.1 km^{2} (1,198.1 sq mi)	
East Bowes	46 (SAL 2021)	165.1 km^{2} (63.7 sq mi)	
Eurardy	0 (SAL 2021)	1,496 km^{2} (578 sq mi)	
Gregory	53 (SAL 2021)	3 km^{2} (1.2 sq mi)	
Horrocks	161 (SAL 2021)	1.4 km^{2} (0.54 sq mi)	
Isseka	57 (SAL 2021)	3.2 km^{2} (1.2 sq mi)	
Kalbarri	1,478 (SAL 2021)	142.3 km^{2} (54.9 sq mi)	
Kalbarri National Park ‡	0 (SAL 2021)	1,807 km^{2} (698 sq mi)	
Northampton	830 (SAL 2021)	11.8 km^{2} (4.6 sq mi)	
Ogilvie	56 (SAL 2021)	596.8 km^{2} (230.4 sq mi)	
Sandy Gully	110 (SAL 2021)	286.4 km^{2} (110.6 sq mi)	
West Binnu	21 (SAL 2021)	313.7 km^{2} (121.1 sq mi)	
Yallabatharra	79 (SAL 2021)	966.5 km^{2} (373.2 sq mi)	
Zuytdorp	0 (SAL 2016)	1,708 km^{2} (659 sq mi)	

- ( ‡ indicates boundaries of national park and locality are not identical)

== Population ==
The population of the Shire of Northampton as at the 2006 census was 3,204 (Usual Residents) or 4,085 (Place of Enumeration). The disparity is due to holiday accommodation in Kalbarri being picked up in the latter count.

Historical population

Year	Pop.	±% p.a.
1911	1,412	—
1921	1,518	+0.73%
1933	1,677	+0.83%
1947	1,470	−0.94%
1954	1,753	+2.55%
1961	1,821	+0.55%
1966	2,021	+2.11%
1971	2,142	+1.17%
1976	2,422	+2.49%

Year	Pop.	±% p.a.
1981	2,366	−0.47%
1986	3,034	+5.10%
1991	3,480	+2.78%
1996	3,697	+1.22%
2001	4,136	+2.27%
2006	4,085	−0.25%
2011	3,192	−4.81%
2016	3,319	+0.78%
2021	3,227	−0.56%

== Notable councillors ==
- Thomas Burges, Mines Road Board member 1871–1877, briefly chairman; later a colonial MP
- Samuel Mitchell, Mines Road Board member 1872–1879, chairman 1876–1879; later a colonial MP
- John Cunningham, Northampton Road Board member 1900s; later a state MP
- William Patrick, Northampton Road Board member 1918–1930; later a state MP
- Les Logan, Northampton Road Board member 1940–1945; later a state MP

== Heritage-listed places ==
As of 2023, 223 places are heritage-listed in the Shire of Northampton, of which 30 are on the State Register of Heritage Places, among them the Lynton Convict Hiring Depot.
