= Bowes, Western Australia =

Bowes
- Town
- Coordinates: 28°22′19″S 114°37′55″E
- Country: Australia
- State: Western Australia
- LGA(s): Shire of Northampton

Government
  - State electorate(s): Moore
  - Federal division(s): Durack

Area
  - Total: 222.8 km^{2} (86.0 sq mi)

Population
  - Total(s): 104 (SAL 2021)
- Postcode: 6535

Bowes is a town in the Mid West region of Western Australia.
