= Ogilvie, Western Australia =

Ogilvie
- Town
- Interactive map of Ogilvie
- Coordinates: 28°8′25″S 114°38′52″E
- Country: Australia
- State: Western Australia
- LGA: Shire of Northampton

Government
  - State electorate: Moore
  - Federal division: Durack

Area
  - Total: 596.8 km^{2} (230.4 sq mi)

Population
  - Total: 56 (SAL 2021)
- Postcode: 6535

Ogilvie is a small town in the Mid West region of Western Australia. Other than sheep, agriculturally the area was known for wheat, barley, oats, lupins, Wimmera rye, and clover.

The area is about 70 kilometres north of Geraldton, and includes the small Ogilvie Nature Reserve.

The town was named by 1916 as a farming community, likely to have been named after Andrew Jameson Ogilvie (–8 October 1906), the land owner of the nearby Murchison House Station. Over time the locale was serviced by a railway siding of the same name.

The Ogilvie State School was in existence by 1917, while two acres of land was set aside for a tennis court in the same year. The Ogilvie Agricultural Hall was opened in May 1919. This public hall was used for dances, a church, and as the local school. By 1953, the hall also had a supper room and nursery.

The Ogilvie and District Branch of the Primary Producers' Association was re-formed in July 1925. Its representations included to the Western Australian Minister for Agriculture for emus to be declared vermin following continued widespread crop destruction.

Tennis continued to be an important community activity, with new tennis courts constructed by and opened in December 1946. In that year, the wheat and barley crops were only a moderate harvest, an abundance of emus, but a notable impact of foxes on lambing stock.

Efforts were made to form a fire brigade in 1952.
