= East Bowes, Western Australia =

East Bowes
- Town
- Coordinates: 28°19′57″S 114°45′0″E
- Country: Australia
- State: Western Australia
- LGA: Shire of Northampton
- Location: 470 km (290 mi) north of Perth; 3 km (1.9 mi) west of Northampton; 53 km (33 mi) north west of Geraldton

Government
  - State electorate: Moore
  - Federal division: Durack

Area
  - Total: 165.1 km^{2} (63.7 sq mi)
- Elevation: 17 m (56 ft)

Population
  - Total: 46 (SAL 2021)
- Postcode: 6535

East Bowes is a town in the Mid West region of Western Australia. It is located 470 kilometres (290 mi) north of the state capital, Perth, and 3 kilometres (1.9 mi) west of Northampton, the closest major town.
