= George Brand (convict) =

Convict and settler of Western Australia

George Brand (c. 1820 – 1872) was a convict transported to colonial Western Australia. Born in Perthshire, Scotland around 1820, Brand married Isabella Duncan in January 1840. Over the next seven years they had three sons and one daughter.

Brand was working as a carter in 1852 when he was convicted of theft at Edinburgh;

Brand's occupation as a carter presented opportunities for picking up stray articles. He succumbed to temptation [...].

Brand was sentenced to 14 years' transportation, and arrived in Western Australia on board Stag in June 1855. He received his ticket of leave the following year, and took up employment in the Greenough area. By the time he received his conditional pardon in August 1859, his wife and children had emigrated to the colony to join him. A fifth child was born in 1861.

In 1867, Brand bought 36 hectares (90 acres) of land at Bootenal Reserve near Dongara. The family worked to establish a farm there, and later became active in the district's civic affairs. George Brand died in 1872. Each of his sons later became successful farmers in the district, and every one of his children married out of the convict class. This was unusual for the time, when the social stigma of being a convict created barriers between the social classes of "bond" and "free". Brand's great-grandson David Brand (1912–1979) became the longest-serving Premier of Western Australia and was knighted KCMG in 1969.
