= Kevin Minson =

Australian politician (born 1947)

Kevin John Minson (born 5 May 1947) is an Australian former politician.

He was born in Port Hedland and was a farmer and dental surgeon before entering politics. In 1989 he was elected to the Western Australian Legislative Assembly as the Liberal member for Greenough. He immediately won promotion to the front bench as Shadow Minister for Conservation, Land Management, Waterways and Midwest, and held a variety of shadow portfolios over the next term, as well as becoming Deputy Leader of the Opposition from 1990 to 1992. In 1993, with the Liberal Party's election victory, he became Minister for the Environment, Aboriginal Affairs and Disability Services, trading Environment for Works and Services in 1995 and later adding Mines in 1996. He stepped down from the front bench in 1997 and retired in 2001.

Western Australian Legislative Assembly
Preceded by Reg Tubby	Member for Greenough; 1989–2001	Succeeded by Jamie Edwards
