= John Cunningham (Australian politician) =

Australian farmer

Member of the Legislative Assembly of Western Australia
- In office 2 October 1914 – 26 September 1917
- Preceded by: John Nanson
- Succeeded by: Henry Maley
- Constituency: Greenough

Personal details
- Born: 28 December 1867 Northampton, Western Australia, Australia
- Died: 30 October 1949 (aged 81) Geraldton, Western Australia, Australia
- Party: Country

John Cunningham (28 December 1867 – 30 October 1949) was an Australian farmer and politician who was a Country Party member of the Legislative Assembly of Western Australia from 1914 to 1917, representing the seat of Greenough.

Cunningham was born in Northampton, Western Australia, to Mary (née Lenahan) and Timothy Cunningham. He farmed in the area and was prominent in local agricultural circles, also serving on the Northampton Road Board. Cunningham entered parliament at the 1914 state election, replacing the retiring John Nanson. He was defeated at the 1917 election by Henry Maley, another endorsed Country candidate, and failed to even make the final two-candidate-preferred count. After leaving politics, Cunningham returned to farming. He died in Geraldton in October 1949, aged 81, and was unmarried.

Parliament of Western Australia
Preceded by John Nanson	Member for Greenough; 1914–1917	Succeeded by Henry Maley
