= Richard Horrocks =

English cricketer (1857–1926)

Richard Horrocks (29 August 1857 – 19 June 1926) was an English cricketer active from 1880 to 1882 who played for Lancashire. He was born and died in Church, Lancashire. He appeared in seven first-class matches as a righthanded batsman, scoring 121 runs with a highest score of 61 and held one catch.
