= Mark Horrocks =

English cricketer

Personal information
- Full name: Mark Horrocks
- Born: 13 January 1977 (age 49); Hereford, Herefordshire, England
- Batting: Right-handed
- Bowling: Right-arm medium

Domestic team information
- Years: Team
- 2001-2004: Herefordshire

Career statistics
Competition	LA
Matches	2
Runs scored	3
Batting average	–
100s/50s	–/–
Top score	3*
Balls bowled	66
Wickets	1
Bowling average	78.00
5 wickets in innings	–
10 wickets in match	–
Best bowling	1/46
Catches/stumpings	–/–
- Source: Cricinfo, 25 November 2010

Mark Horrocks (born 13 January 1977) is a former English cricketer. Horrocks was a right-handed batsman who bowled right-arm medium pace. He was born in Hereford, Herefordshire.

Horrocks made his debut for Herefordshire in the 2001 Minor Counties Championship against Berkshire. From 2001 to 2004, he represented the county in 7 Championship matches, the last of which came against Berkshire. His MCCA Knockout Trophy debut for the county came against the Gloucestershire Cricket Board in 2002. From 2002 to 2004, he represented the county in 6 Trophy matches, the last of which came against Wiltshire.

He also represented Herefordshire in 2 List A matches. These came against Oxfordshire in the 1st round of the 2004 Cheltenham & Gloucester Trophy which was played in 2003 and Worcestershire in the 2nd round of the same competition, which was played in 2004. In his 2 matches, he took a single wicket at a bowling average of 78.00, with best figures of 1/46.
