= Jamie Edwards =

Australian politician

Jeremy Philip Dalhousie Edwards (born 27 March 1946), known as Jamie Edwards, is an Australian politician. He was a Liberal Party member of the Western Australian Legislative Assembly from 2001 to 2005, representing the electorate of Greenough.

Edwards was born in Winchester in the United Kingdom, the son of a farmer, and moved to Australia in 1967. He operated a secondhand furniture and white goods business before entering politics. He also served as shire president of the Shire of Greenough and as president of the Western Australian Municipal Association, a role in which he had a reputation as being outspoken.

Edwards entered state politics at the 2001 state election, retaining held the seat of Greenough for the Liberal Party, which had been held by the party for sixty years, but where the party was facing a challenge from coalition partner the National Party. He was appointed Shadow Minister for Heritage and the Mid West upon his election, and added the Water Resources portfolio not long after. He was shifted to the roles of Shadow Minister for Local Government, Heritage and the Mid West in February 2003, and added the additional portfolio of Planning in May 2004. He vocally opposed the equalisation of the age of consent for gay couples in December 2001, revealing that he had been sexually abused by a man as a thirteen-year-old. He was one of seven MPs to storm out of the chamber in protest at the passage of a motion opposing the Iraq War in March 2003.

Edwards faced another strong challenge from the National Party at the 2005 election, with a new National candidate in Geraldton radio host and former ABC TV weatherman Grant Woodhams. The result was not known until eleven days after the election, but Woodhams emerged successful, defeating Edwards by 292 votes.

Parliament of Western Australia
Preceded by Kevin Minson	Member for Greenough; 2001–2005	Succeeded by Grant Woodhams
