= Binnu, Western Australia =

Binnu
- Town
- Interactive map of Binnu
- Coordinates: 28.02°S 114.40°E
- Country: Australia
- State: Western Australia
- LGA: Shire of Northampton
- Location: 35 km (22 mi) N of Northampton; 62 km (39 mi) SE of Kalbarri; 515 km (320 mi) NW of Perth
- Established: 1932

Government
  - State electorate: North West
  - Federal division: Durack

Area
  - Total: 756.2 km^{2} (292.0 sq mi)
- Elevation: 247 m (810 ft)

Population
  - Total: 58 (SAL 2021)
- Postcode: 6532

Binnu is a town on the North West Coastal Highway in the Mid West region of Western Australia.

The name derives from a well on the outskirts of town that was first in use in 1909. The name is Indigenous Australian in origin and is thought to mean either to squeeze or place of emus. The townsite was gazetted in 1932.

The main industry in the area is agriculture, particularly the production of wheat and lupins. The town was gripped by a two-year drought from 2006 then had a bumper crop in 2008.

In 2009 up to 30% of crops were lost as a result of damage caused by a mouse plague. Sheep are also raised, particularly Merinos, although problems with salinity, erosion and drought are common.

The main industry in town is wheat farming with the town being a Cooperative Bulk Handling receival site.
