= John Nanson =

Australian politician

The Honourable John Nanson
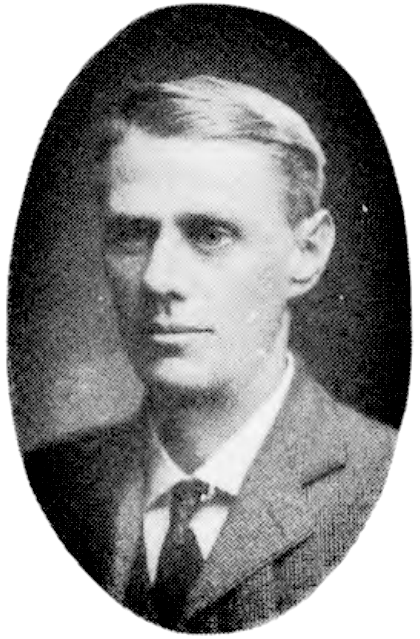

Attorney-General of Western Australia
- In office 30 June 1909 – 7 October 1911
- Premier: Newton Moore; Frank Wilson
- Preceded by: Hector Rason
- Succeeded by: Thomas Walker

Member of the Legislative Assembly of Western Australia
- In office 24 April 1901 – 28 June 1904
- Preceded by: Samuel Mitchell
- Succeeded by: John Holman
- Constituency: Murchison
- In office 28 June 1904 – 27 October 1905
- Preceded by: Patrick Stone
- Succeeded by: Patrick Stone
- Constituency: Greenough
- In office 11 September 1908 – 21 October 1914
- Preceded by: Patrick Stone
- Succeeded by: John Cunningham
- Constituency: Greenough

Personal details
- Born: 22 September 1863 Carlisle, Cumberland, England
- Died: 29 February 1916 (aged 52) Wimborne, Dorset, England
- Spouse: Janet Nanson

John Leighton Nanson (22 September 1863 – 29 February 1916) was a journalist and politician in Western Australia. A former writer and sub-editor with The West Australian, he served in the Legislative Assembly of Western Australia from 1901 to 1905 and again from 1908 to 1914. Nanson was a minister in the governments of Alf Morgans, Walter James, Newton Moore, and Frank Wilson, including as attorney-general from 1909 to 1911.

== Early life ==
Nanson was born in Carlisle, Cumberland, England. He attended Carlisle Grammar School and King William's College (on the Isle of Man). After leaving school, Nanson emigrated to Australia, initially living in Broken Hill, New South Wales, and then going to South Australia. He arrived in Western Australia in the mid-1880s, worked as a journalist. In 1899, he was made an associate editor of The West Australian, having previously served as its Fremantle correspondent.

== Politics ==
Nanson was elected to parliament at the 1901 state election, winning the seat of Murchison from the sitting member, Samuel Mitchell. In November 1901, after only seven months as an MP, he was made Minister for Lands in the newly formed Morgans ministry, which lasted for just 32 days. Nanson was elevated to the ministry for a second time in January 1904, as a minister without portfolio in the James ministry. He replaced Hector Rason as Minister for Works a few months later, but the government fell in August 1904 (after a vote of no confidence).

At the 1904 state election, Nanson had switched seats, defeating Patrick Stone in the seat of Greenough. His old seat, Murchison, was lost to the Labor Party. However, Nanson did not re-contest his seat at the 1905 election, instead travelling to England to study law. He was called to the bar in 1908, and later that year returned to Australia, reclaiming the seat of Greenough at the 1908 state election. Nanson was elevated to the ministry for a third time in May 1909, as a minister without portfolio in the Moore ministry. In a reshuffle the following month, he was made Attorney-General and Minister for Education. He retained his portfolios when Frank Wilson replaced Newton Moore as premier in September 1910, but the government was defeated at the 1911 election.

== Later life ==
Nanson left for England in 1913, and did not re-contest Greenough at the 1914 election. He died in Wimborne, Dorset, in February 1916, aged 52.

== Private life ==
He and Janet Drummond Durlacher were married in 1887. She was a journalist working for the West Australian. They had two children but only one survived to be an adult. Janet Nanson wrote under the nom de plume of "Sigma" in Perth and when she worked for the Western Mail as the founding writer of "Aunt Mary". She turned to writing about politics for the while her husband was the Morning Herald's owner. She died in 1943 in Perth.

Parliament of Western Australia
Preceded by Samuel Mitchell	Member for Murchison; 1901–1904	Succeeded by John Holman
Preceded by Patrick Stone; Patrick Stone	Member for Greenough; 1904–1905; 1908–1914	Succeeded by Patrick Stone; John Cunningham
Political offices
Preceded by Charles Sommers	Minister for Lands; 1901	Succeeded by Adam Jameson
Preceded by Hector Rason	Minister for Works; 1904	Succeeded by William Johnson
Preceded by Newton Moore	Attorney-General; 1909–1911	Succeeded by Thomas Walker
Preceded by Frank Wilson	Minister for Education; 1909–1911	Succeeded by Thomas Walker
