= William Traylen =

Australian politician (1843–1926)

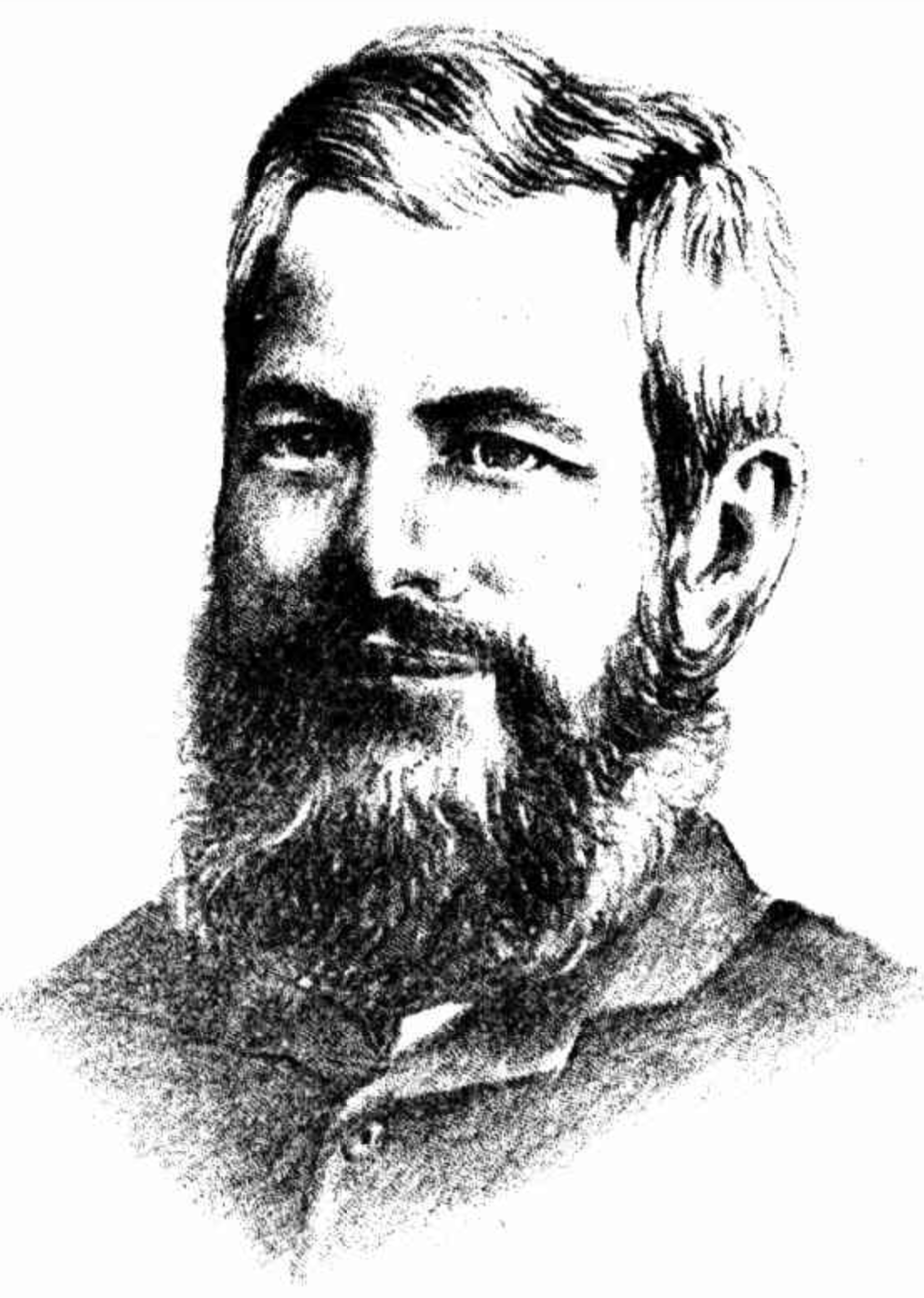
- Traylen in 1888

Member of the Western Australian Legislative Assembly
- In office 29 November 1890 – 3 May 1897
- Preceded by: None (new creation)
- Succeeded by: Richard Pennefather
- Constituency: Greenough

Personal details
- Born: 25 February 1843 Chesterton, Huntingdonshire, England
- Died: 27 December 1926 (aged 83) East Guildford, Western Australia, Australia

William Traylen (25 February 1843 – 27 December 1926) was an Australian Methodist minister and politician who served in the Western Australian Legislative Assembly from 1890 to 1897. He was the first Methodist minister ordained in Western Australia.

Traylen was born in Chesterton, Huntingdonshire, England. He arrived in Western Australia in 1857, but later turned to England for a year to train for the ministry. He returned to Australia in 1867, ministering at York for three years before being fully ordained at Wesley Church, Perth, in 1870. Traylen ministered at Geraldton from 1870 to 1873, then returned to York from 1873 to 1878, and was finally superintendent in Perth from 1878 to 1879. He left the ministry in 1879 to establish a printing works in Perth.

In 1886, Traylen unsuccessfully ran for the Legislative Council, losing a by-election for the seat of Perth to Edward Scott. He eventually entered parliament at the 1890 general election (the first to be held for the Legislative Assembly), winning the seat of Greenough. In the same year, Traylen was also elected to the Perth City Council. He served on the council until 1897, and contested the mayoral election in 1892, but lost to Stephen Henry Parker. Traylen was re-elected to the Legislative Assembly at the 1894 election, and was subsequently appointed chairman of committees.

Traylen lost his seat to Richard Pennefather at the 1897 election, and after leaving parliament was appointed chairman of the Perth Water Board, serving in that position from 1898 to 1904. He eventually retired to Guildford, and was elected to the Guildford Municipal Council, serving as mayor from 1914 to 1918. Traylen died in East Guildford in 1926, aged 83.

Parliament of Western Australia
New creation	Member for Greenough; 1890–1897	Succeeded by Richard Pennefather
