= Mary Farrelly =

Social worker and diet reformer (1866–1943)

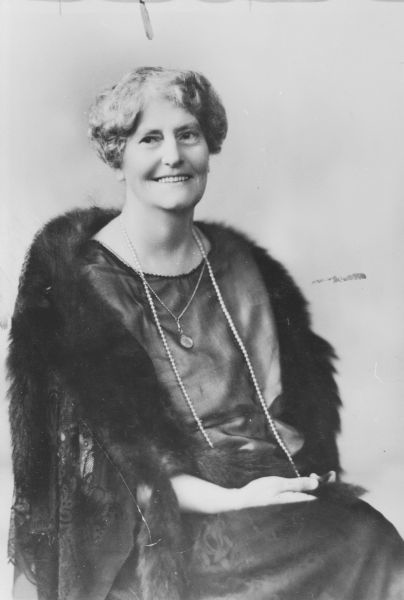
- in 1936
- Born: Mary Martha Maley; June 18, 1866; Greenough, Western Australia
- Died: August 28, 1943 (aged 77); Subiaco, Western Australia
- Known for: diet reformer

Mary Martha Farrelly born Mary Martha Maley (18 June 1866 – 28 August 1943) was an Australian social worker and diet reformer. She recommended fresh food, wholemeal wheat and no alcohol.

== Life ==
Farrelly was born in Greenough in 1866. Her mother was Elizabeth Kniest (born Waldeck) whose Methodist parents had been missionaries. Her father, John Stephen Maley, started a successful flour mill that supplied Greenough and its surrounds. She was one of fourteen children. Two of her brothers became members of the Western Australian Parliament.

She was an early member of the Women's Service Guilds which began in 1909. The Kindergarten system in the state was founded by that organisation, as was the local Girl Guides Association.

She was a member of the Woman's Christian Temperance Union. In 1921 she became a Justice of the Peace.

She was an advocate for fresh food and notably wholemeal wheat; which she believed had restored her to full health after an illness. She published a cookery book to encourage the use of wholemeal flour. She believed that white flour lacked the valuable part of the grain. She would enthusiastically chew wholemeal puffed wheat and also tell people about its many advantages. Sometimes she did these at exactly the same time with predictable results.

When the Western Australian Historical Society started she was one of the four co-founders. Later in 1926 she was elected to be one of the society's senior vice-presidents.

The first Country Women's Association had been founded in New South Wales in 1922. Farrelly was involved with that part of the organisation that formed in Western Australia. She had been a member of a group called Country Circles which dated from 1912 and she was running courses for them in domestic science and it was there that Country Women's Association in Western Australia took hold. Farrelly was known for her interesting talks and demonstrations. During the depression she published "How to Cook Wheat" which gave advice on recipes involving wholegrain wheat and it was popular.

Farrelly died in Subiaco in 1943.

== Private life ==
She married young and the marriage did not work out. Her husband who was a solicitor, had mental health issues and they decided to separate.
