= Patrick Stone =

Australian politician

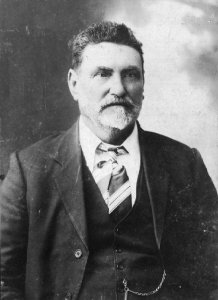
Patrick Stone

Patrick Stone (14 March 1854 – 23 December 1926) was a Member of the Western Australian Legislative Assembly from 1901 to 1904, and from 1905 to 1908.

Born in Buncrana in Inishowen, County Donegal, Ireland, on 14 March 1854, Patrick Stone was the eldest son of army private James Stone and Ann Dorothy née Doherty. His father had served in the British Army in India and Afghanistan and after being wounded there had been invalided back to Britain where he married. When the British government agreed to transport convicts to Western Australia, James elected to become part of the Enrolled Pensioner Guard, guarding the convicts on their voyage to Western Australia. Patrick travelled with his parents and younger brother James on board the convict transport William Hammond, arriving in Western Australia in April 1856. (Note: Stone not listed among 89 pensioner guards and their families aboard William Hammond.) The Stone's lived in Fremantle where his father was based until the 1860s when they moved to Greenough where his father had been granted land. Patrick received a brief education at the Roman Catholic school at Fremantle, before working for his father on the Greenough farm until around 1880.

On 8 February 1880, Stone married Helen Emily Roe, daughter of James Elphinstone Roe. He then set himself up as a storekeeper and produce merchant, becoming the town's most prominent and successful merchant over a long period. He also became owner of the Commonwealth Hotel, and was a director of the Geraldton Co-op. Milling Society.

Stone was a member of the Greenough Road Board in 1878 and 1879, and between 1888 and 1916 he was a member of the Geraldton Municipal Council in a series of broken stints totalling around 13 years. On 19 June 1894 he contested the Western Australian Legislative Assembly seat of Geraldton but was unsuccessful. He contested the seat again in the by-election of 24 July 1900, but again without success. On 24 April 1901, he won the seat of Greenough, holding it until the election of 28 June 1904, when he was defeated by John Nanson. The following year Nanson resigned the seat to study law in England, and Stone won the seat for a second time on 27 October 1905. This time he held it until the election of 11 September 1908, when he was again defeated by Nanson, who had returned to Western Australia that year.

Stone continued to contest elections for the rest of his life, contesting a further six elections without success. In 1910 he contested for a Central Province seat in the Western Australian Legislative Council. The following year he contested Geraldton. He contested Central Province in 1914 and 1920, before contesting for a seat in the Australian Senate in 1922. In May 1926 he contested for a Central Province seat for a fourth time. He died six months later on 23 December 1926, and was buried in Geraldton Cemetery.

== General references ==
- Black, David; Bolton, Geoffrey (2001a). Biographical Register of Members of the Parliament of Western Australia. Vol. One: 1870–1930 (Revised ed.). Parliament House: Parliament of Western Australia. ISBN 0730738140.
- Fisher, Paul. "Patrick Stone". Paul Fisher's Family History. Archived from the original on 3 March 2016.
