= Maurice Kennedy (politician) =

Australian politician

Member of the Legislative Assembly of Western Australia
- In office 22 March 1924 – 26 March 1930
- Preceded by: Henry Maley
- Succeeded by: William Patrick
- Constituency: Greenough

Personal details
- Born: 13 August 1884 Brunswick, Victoria, Australia
- Died: 28 November 1939 (aged 55) Subiaco, Western Australia, Australia
- Party: Labor

Maurice John Kennedy (13 August 1884 – 28 November 1939) was an Australian trade unionist and politician who was a Labor Party member of the Legislative Assembly of Western Australia from 1924 to 1930, representing the seat of Greenough.

Kennedy was born in Melbourne to Margaret (née Cleary) and Martin Joseph Kennedy. His family moved to Western Australia at a young age, and after leaving school he began working for Western Australian Government Railways. Kennedy eventually became an official for the Amalgamated Society of Railway Employees. He entered parliament at the 1924 state election, defeating Henry Maley (the sitting Country member). Kennedy was re-elected in 1927, but at the 1930 election lost his seat to the Country Party's William Patrick. After leaving parliament, Kennedy worked for the Main Roads Department. He died in Perth in November 1939, aged 55. Kennedy had married Ursula Mary Stone in 1914, with whom he had three children. Through his wife's sister, he was a brother-in-law of John Willcock, a Labor premier.

Parliament of Western Australia
Preceded by Henry Maley	Member for Greenough; 1924–1930	Succeeded by William Patrick
