= Horrocks, Western Australia =

Horrocks
- Town
- Interactive map of Horrocks
- Coordinates: 28.38165°S 114.43039°E
- Country: Australia
- State: Western Australia
- LGA: Shire of Northampton
- Location: 499 km (310 mi) north of Perth; 20 km (12 mi) west of Northampton; 55 km (34 mi) north west of Geraldton

Government
  - State electorate: Moore
  - Federal division: Durack

Area
  - Total: 1.4 km^{2} (0.54 sq mi)
- Elevation: 10 m (33 ft)

Population
  - Total: 161 (SAL 2021)
- Postcode: 6535
- Mean max temp: 27.7 °C (81.9 °F)
- Mean min temp: 15.4 °C (59.7 °F)
- Annual rainfall: 433 mm (17.0 in)

Horrocks also known as Horrocks Beach is a coastal town in the Mid West region of Western Australia. It is located 499 kilometres (310 mi) north of the state capital, Perth and 22 kilometres (14 mi) west of Northampton, the closest major town.

In the 2016 census Horrocks had a population of 138 people in 184 dwellings (63 occupied). Most of the dwellings are holiday houses. The population of Horrocks fluctuates depending on tourism, with the town at full capacity during school holidays and throughout the summer. During the census (Tuesday 9 August) 62% of dwellings were unoccupied (national average 11%).

The town was named after Joseph Lucas Horrocks, a convict who was transported to Western Australia in 1851 for forging and uttering. Horrocks received a conditional pardoned in 1856. He built a non-denominational and first church in Northampton.

The Horrocks Community Centre is available for public and private use.
