= Reg Tubby =

Australian politician

Member of the Legislative Assembly of Western Australia
- In office 1 November 1975 – 4 February 1989
- Preceded by: Sir David Brand
- Succeeded by: Kevin Minson
- Constituency: Greenough

Personal details
- Born: 1924 Geraldton, Western Australia, Australia
- Died: 14 October 2015 (aged 91) Joondalup, Western Australia, Australia
- Party: Liberal

Reginald John Tubby (1924 – 14 October 2015) was an Australian politician who was a Liberal Party member of the Legislative Assembly of Western Australia from 1975 to 1989, representing the seat of Greenough.

Tubby was born in Geraldton, Western Australia, to Constance Edith (née Jones) and John William Tubby. He was raised on his father's farm at Gutha, a locality 170 kilometres (110 mi) south-east of Geraldton. Tubby enlisted in the Royal Australian Air Force (RAAF) in January 1943, and served in the Northern Territory during the war. After his discharge in 1946, he returned to Gutha, taking over an abandoned farm. Becoming prominent in agricultural circles, Tubby was elected to the Morawa Roads Board (later the Shire of Morawa) in 1953, and would serve on the council until 1976, including nine years as shire president.

Tubby entered parliament at the 1975 Greenough by-election, which had been caused by the resignation of Sir David Brand, a former premier. He was re-elected at the 1977, 1980, 1983, and 1986 state elections, and served as deputy chairman of committees in the Legislative Assembly from 1980 to 1983. In his final term in parliament, he was joined by his son, Fred Tubby, who had been elected to the seat of Dale at a 1988 by-election. Tubby left parliament at the 1989 state election, and retired to Perth. He died there in October 2015, aged 91.

Parliament of Western Australia
Preceded by Sir David Brand	Member for Greenough; 1975–1989	Succeeded by Kevin Minson
