= Sandy Gully, Western Australia =

Sandy Gully
- Town
- Coordinates: 28°21′55″S 114°32′52″E
- Country: Australia
- State: Western Australia
- LGA(s): Shire of Northampton

Government
  - State electorate(s): Moore
  - Federal division(s): Durack

Area
  - Total: 286.4 km^{2} (110.6 sq mi)

Population
  - Total(s): 110 (SAL 2021)
- Postcode: 6535

Sandy Gully is a small town in the Mid West region of Western Australia.
