= John Horrocks (fisherman) =

- Born: 29 June 1816
- Died: 13 June 1881 (aged 64)

John Horrocks (29 June 1816 – 13 June 1881) was the founder and innovator of modern European fly fishing.

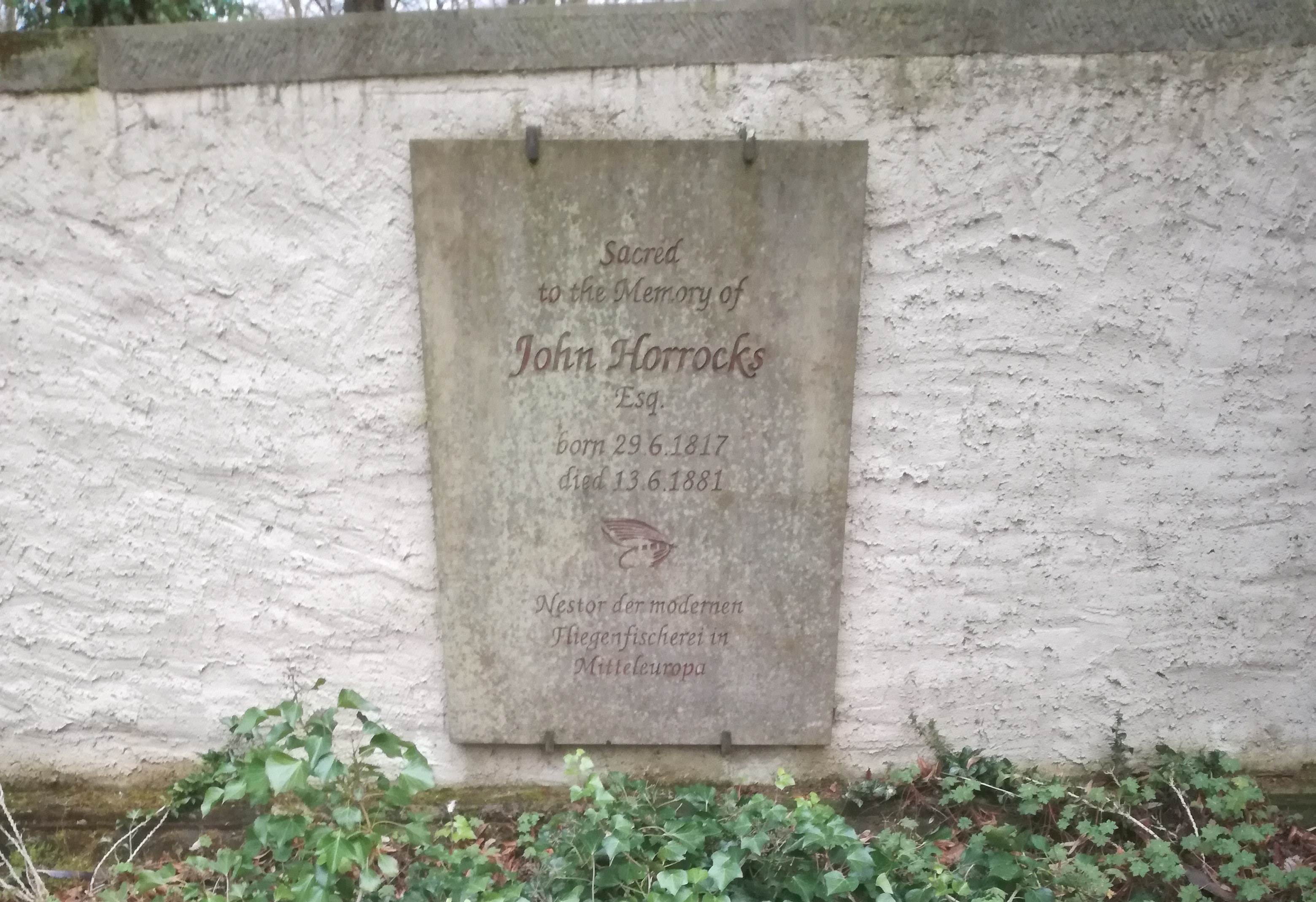
Memorial Plate of John Horrock in Historical Cemetery, Weimar

Horrocks was born in Edinburgh. He was the grandson of John Horrocks. In 1835 he fly-fished for the first time in the Ilm and other German rivers. In 1842 he moved to Weimar, later writing the standard work on fly fishing, entitled The art of fly fishing for trout and grayling in Germany and Austria. It was first published in 1874 and describes the state of fishing as a sport in England, the decline of fisheries due to over-fishing and the inadequacy of the existing fishing laws - it also calls for the abolition of medieval customs and outdated fishing methods and the introduction of laws to protect fish stocks.

He married three times and after his move to Weimar he was widowed twice. His first wife was Caroline Hahn (died 1847), his second Isabella Zwierlein (1825-1853) and his third Maura Diehme. He died and is buried at Weimar.

== Notes ==
- Preylowski, Jurgen F. (Summer 1999). "John Horrocks (1817-1881): A Pioneer of Fly Fishing in Germany" (PDF). The American Fly Fisher. 25 (3). The American Museum of Fly Fishing: 13–20. Archived from the original (PDF) on 29 November 2014.
