= David Brand =

Australian politician (1912–1979)

The Honourable Sir David Brand KCMG
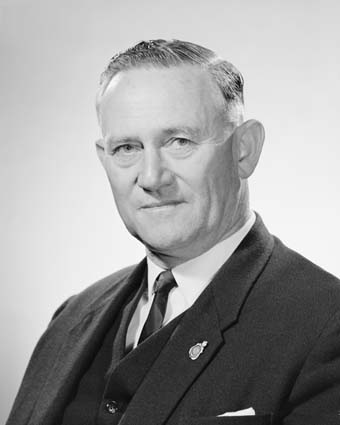

19th Premier of Western Australia
- In office 2 April 1959 – 3 March 1971
- Monarch: Elizabeth II
- Governor: Sir Charles Gairdner; Sir Douglas Kendrew
- Deputy: Arthur Watts; Sir Crawford Nalder
- Preceded by: Albert Hawke
- Succeeded by: John Tonkin

Leader of the Liberal Party in Western Australia
- In office 1 March 1957 – 5 June 1972
- Deputy: Charles Court
- Preceded by: Ross McLarty
- Succeeded by: Charles Court

Member of the Western Australian Legislative Assembly
- In office 27 October 1945 – 21 August 1975
- Preceded by: John Newton
- Succeeded by: Reg Tubby
- Constituency: Greenough

Personal details
- Born: 1 August 1912 Dongara, Western Australia, Australia
- Died: 15 April 1979 (aged 66) Carnamah, Western Australia, Australia
- Party: Liberal
- Spouse: Doris McNeill (m. 1944)
- Occupation: Farmer; Miner

Sir David Brand KCMG (1 August 1912 – 15 April 1979) was an Australian politician. He was the longest-serving premier of Western Australia, in office from 1959 to 1971, and was state leader of the Liberal Party from 1957 to 1972.

Brand was born in Dongara, Western Australia. He was raised on farms in the Mid West and left school at the age of 14. He moved to the Eastern Goldfields in 1935 and worked as a miner for several years, later serving in the Australian Army during World War II where he was wounded on the Greek campaign. Brand was elected to the Parliament of Western Australia at a 1945 by-election for the seat of Greenough. He served as a cabinet minister under Ross McLarty from 1949 to 1953 and replaced McLarty as leader of the Liberal Party in 1957.

Brand led the Liberal Party to victory at the 1959 state election and won three subsequent terms governing in coalition with the Country Party. His term as premier saw significant population growth and economic development, including the expansion of the Ord River Scheme and the development of the iron ore mining industry in the Pilbara and the bauxite mining industry in the south-west. Brand's government was defeated at the 1971 state election and he resigned as Liberal leader in 1972 and from parliament in 1975. The federal Division of Brand and Brand Highway are named in his honour.

== Early life ==
Brand was born on 1 August 1912 in Dongara, Western Australia. He was the first of four children born to Hilda (née Mitchell) and Albert John Brand. His maternal grandfather was Samuel Mitchell, a Cornish immigrant who was a pioneer of the mining industry in Western Australia and served in both houses of state parliament. His father's grandfather George Brand was transported to Western Australia on the convict ship Stag in 1855, subsequently settling in the Greenough area.

Brand's parents acquired a farm at Northampton shortly after his birth. In 1924 they moved to Mullewa, where he attended the local state school. He left school at 14 to work on the farm, and at Mullewa became secretary of the local branch of the Primary Producers' Association.

In 1935, Brand moved to Kalgoorlie and worked at the Golden Horseshoe Mine, as a truck driver, treatment hand, filter specialist and shift boss. In February 1938 he discovered the body of a co-worker, Walter Veitch, who had been fatally electrocuted while working alone at a pumping station. He subsequently gave evidence at the inquest into Veitch's death.

== Military service ==
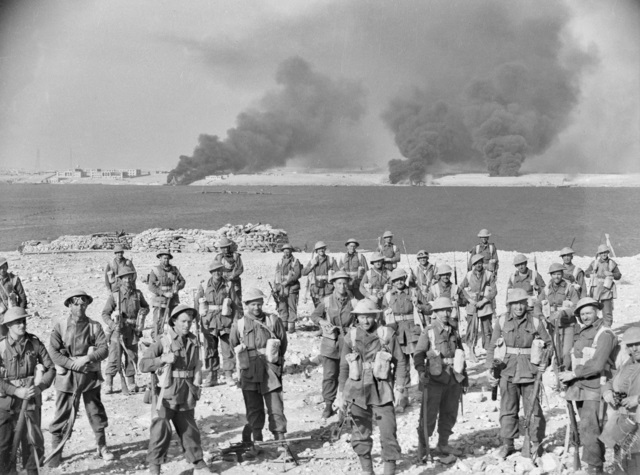
Tobruk, Libya, 22 January 1941. Brand is fifth right in the back row of this picture, as a member of C Company, 2/11th Infantry Battalion. Australian forces were in the process of capturing Tobruk from Italian forces, during Operation Compass.

Following the outbreak of World War II, Brand enlisted in the Australian Imperial Force on 23 November 1939. As a private, he was assigned to the 2/11th Battalion, part of the 6th Division, which embarked for the Middle East on 20 April 1940. Brand fought in the North African campaign, including the advance on Benghazi, and was promoted to corporal before the 2/11th was sent to the Greek campaign, in which he was seriously wounded on 24 April 1941.

Brand was eventually sent back to Australia for further treatment, arriving in August, and was discharged as medically unfit in April 1942. He was re-mobilised in September, as an instructor with the 7th Battalion, Volunteer Defence Corps, in Geraldton and was promoted to Warrant Officer in January 1943. With the war effort beginning to wind down, Brand was discharged from the army in January 1945.

== Early political career ==
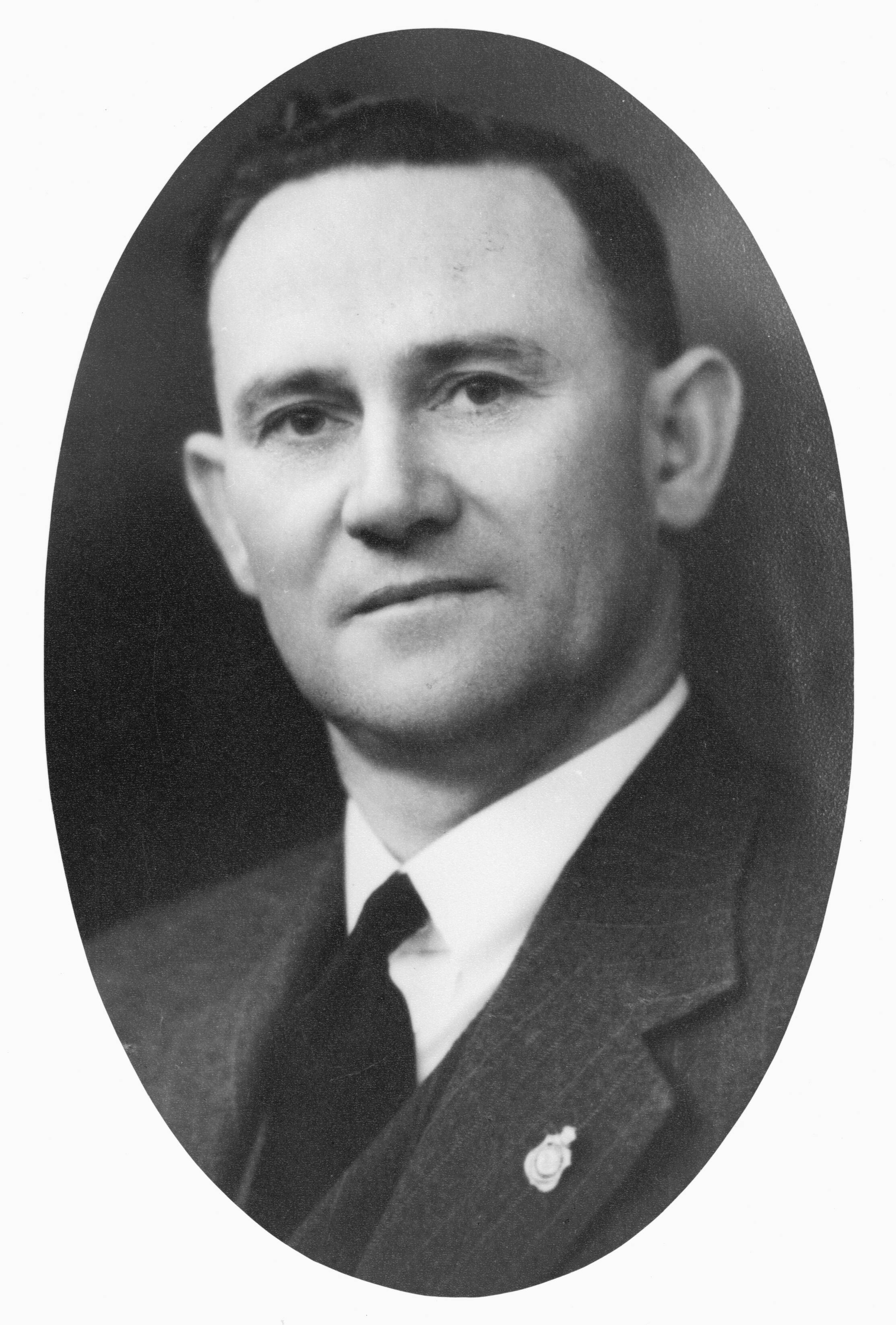
Brand c. 1960

After his army discharge, Brand took over the general store at Dongara.

The incumbent Labor member for the State seat of Greenough, John Newton, was killed in action with the RAAF in 1945. Brand won the seat for the Liberal Party in a by-election that year, defeating Newton's brother by a narrow margin.

In October 1949, Ross McLarty became Premier and Brand entered the Ministry as Minister for Housing, Forests and Local Government. From April 1950 he was Minister for Works, Water Supply and Housing, working to establish the Kwinana Oil Refinery. Brand would later describe this as one of his greatest achievements. He was also involved in the creation of other major industrial projects.

In 1952, as minister for works, Brand and director of works Russell Dumas commissioned British town planner Gordon Stephenson to develop the first comprehensive regional plan for the Perth metropolitan area, published in 1955 as the Plan for the Metropolitan Region, Perth and Fremantle and commonly known as the Stephenson Plan.

== Premier of Western Australia (1959–1971) ==
=== Electoral record ===
After the Coalition's defeat in 1953, Brand became deputy leader of the Opposition. After McLarty's retirement, Brand was elected party leader on 1 March 1957. The Coalition was returned to power in 1959, and Brand was sworn in as Premier on 2 April. His administration retained office at the elections of 1962, 1965, and 1968. This was achieved with the assistance of the West Australian branch of the Democratic Labor Party (DLP) which split the Labor vote in some metropolitan electorates. The DLP was active in Western Australia between 1959 and 1974.

=== Economic development ===
In 1960, the Federal government lifted its embargo on iron exports, which had been in place since 1938, enabling exploitation of large iron deposits in the Pilbara. The mining of large bauxite deposits in the Darling Scarp also commenced, along with expansion of mineral processing at Kwinana and the South West. Federal finance for the Ord River Scheme was also secured by Brand's government. Substantial oil and gas deposits were discovered in the Pilbara. In 1968, Western Australia ceased to be a net recipient of federal financial assistance. Brand was knighted in June of the following year. The mining-pastoral boom of the 1960s played a big part in ensuring for Brand's government four successive electoral victories over the ALP opposition (led by Hawke until 1967, and by Tonkin from 1967 to 1971).

=== Voting reform ===
In 1962, Brand's government granted voting rights to Indigenous Australians for state elections, making Queensland the last state to deny Indigenous people the right to vote. His government also significantly liberalised the franchise for the Western Australian Legislative Council, removing the property qualification, reducing the voting age from 30 to 21, and reducing the residency qualification from two years to one. Enrolment and voting for the Legislative Council was also made compulsory. In 1970, the government also legislated to lower the voting age from 21 to 18, the first Australian jurisdiction to do so. The measure enjoyed bipartisan support and Brand stated that "by and large the percentage of responsible youth is much the same as it was in our day or anyone's day".

=== Defeat ===
The rapid growth of the Perth metropolitan area, and the strain this put on essential services, eroded the government's popularity, especially after 1969. In addition, Brand's relations with the federal Liberal Party worsened after the retirement of Sir Robert Menzies in 1966. While Brand's administration suffered from a series of controversies relating to environmental, heritage, Aboriginal and housing issues, the impact of production quotas for wheat, imposed by Prime Minister John Gorton led to open conflict with the federal Liberal Party.

In the midst of this conflict the Brand government's attempt to demolish the remains of the Colonial Barracks ("the Barracks Arch") immediately opposite the parliament building led to a parliamentary revolt within the Liberal Party. Brand prevented this by dropping the proposal, and agreeing to allow the National Trust to restore the Arch. However, the strains this had caused within the government became evident when Brand collapsed while speaking publicly in 1971. He recovered, but the Coalition lost the election to Labor by one seat, and Tonkin became Premier.

Brand led the Liberals in opposition until his resignation in 1973; Sir Charles Court succeeded him as the party's leader. He resigned from parliament in 1975.

== Legacy ==
The federal electoral Division of Brand in Western Australia, created in 1984, is named after him, as is the Brand Highway and the Sir David Brand School in Coolbinia. The Sir David Brand Award is the highest award of the West Australian Tourism Awards, in recognition of his work to advance the tourism industry.

== Personal life ==
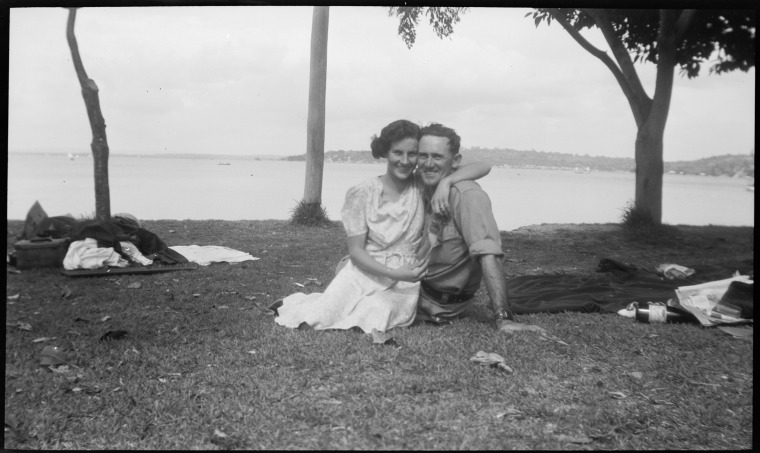
Brand with his wife Doris in 1948

In 1944, Brand married Doris Elspeth McNeill, with whom he had three children. After leaving parliament he retired to his property at Carnamah. Outside of politics he was active in the Methodist Church and was a scoutmaster, later becoming state president of the Boy Scouts' Association. He was also a long-serving patron of the Spastic Welfare Association.

Brand suffered several strokes in his final years, attributed to hypertensive heart disease. He died in his sleep at his home in Carnamah on 15 April 1979, aged 66.

== In popular culture ==
Brand made a guest appearance in the film Nickel Queen while Premier of Western Australia.

== See also ==
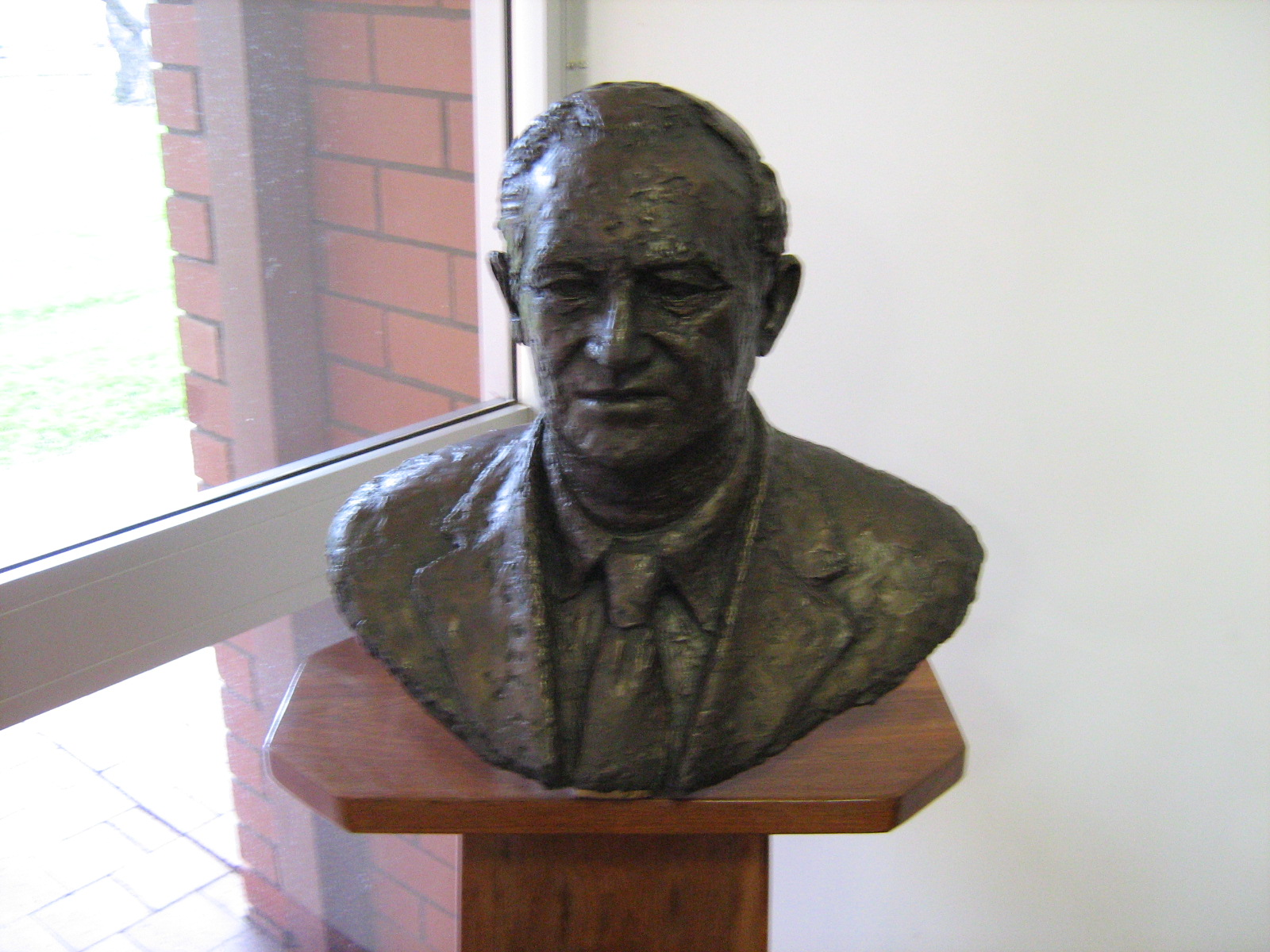
David Brand statue at Shire of Irwin's chambers in Dongara.

- Brand–Watts Ministry (1959–1962)
- Brand–Nalder Ministry (1962–1971)

Political offices
Preceded by Albert Hawke	Premier of Western Australia; 1959–1971	Succeeded by John Tonkin
Party political offices
Preceded by Ross McLarty	Leader of the Liberal Party (Western Australia); 1957–1972	Succeeded by Charles Court
