= Chris Horrocks (writer) =

British writer and art historian

Chris Horrocks is an associate professor in art history at Kingston University, London.

== Biography ==
Chris Horrocks mainly wrote on art and cultural theory. He finished his graduation in Fine Art (Painting) in 1986 and a MA from (RCA) in Cultural history in 1991. Then followed a PHD awarded for his portfolio of texts published in his 20-year career. He also works in arts and science documentary film making. Presently living and working in London, his hobbies include, playing electronic music and traditional banjo.

An expert on the work of theorist Jean Baudrillard, he has authored books on Andy Warhol and Marcel Duchamp, presented lectures on aspects of Japanese and Chinese contemporary art and technology, edited and published a book called Cultures of Colour (2012) and has just finished a book on the films of artists Gilbert & George. Besides doing his research work and writings, he is of late busy doing a documentary film on the life and work of artist Eduardo Paolozzi.

== Writings ==
- Marshall McLuhan & Virtuality, Totem Books (1996) ISBN 1-84046-184-5
- Baudrillard and the Millennium, Totem Books (1999) ISBN 1-84046-091-1
- Introducing Foucault: A Graphic Guide, with Zoran Jevtic, Icon Books (2005) 1-84831-060-9
- Introducing Baudrillard: A Graphic Guide, with Zoran Jevtic, Icon Books (2011) ISBN 1-84831-207-5
- Cultures of Colour: Visual, Material, Textual, Berghahn Books (2012) ISBN 0-8574-5464-1
