= Joseph Horrocks =

Convict and settler of Western Australia

Joseph Lucas Horrocks (1803–1865) was born in Anderton, Lancashire, near Bolton, on 18 November 1803, the first son of William Horrocks, a corn merchant, and Jane Smith. As a convict he was transported to Western Australia in 1851, becoming a prominent early pioneer of the town of Northampton.

Little is known of his early life, except that he was educated, and that at some point he worked as a sick bay attendant in the Royal Navy.

In the 1850s he was carrying on business as a merchant and drysalter in Manchester, trading as Horrocks, Schaer, and Co, and in London, in partnership with Gustav Kober, as Gustav Kober and Co. He was declared bankrupt on 21 March 1851 at Manchester. His secured creditors received 3/10 (£0.19) in the pound.

The UK Census of 31 March 1851 showed Horrocks to be resident at London's Newgate Prison. On 9 April 1851 he pleaded guilty at the Old Bailey in London to forging and uttering three bills of exchange totaling £1,247/0/2, equivalent to A$211,681 in 2022, and was sentenced to fourteen years transportation. Horrocks departed Woolwich on 23 October 1851 and Portland on 2 November 1851 on board Marion, arriving at Fremantle on 31 January 1852.

In 1859, Horrocks took up 40 hectares (100 acres) of land, and, with the help of George Shenton Sr, began to develop a copper mine which he named Gwalla. Between 1862 and 1856, he employed sixty ticket-of-leave men on the mine. He had a road surveyed, along which he built stone cottages which he leased to the married miners at low rent. He encouraged agriculture, experimenting with various crops. In 1861 he began construction of the colony's first interdenominational church, which was opened in October 1864. In November 1863 he applied to the Government for 0.40 hectares (1 acre) of land for a schoolhouse and garden. The school was completed in 1866. Horrocks died on 7 October 1865 at Wanerenooka. The town of Gwalla became Northampton.
