= John Verdun Newton =

Australian politician

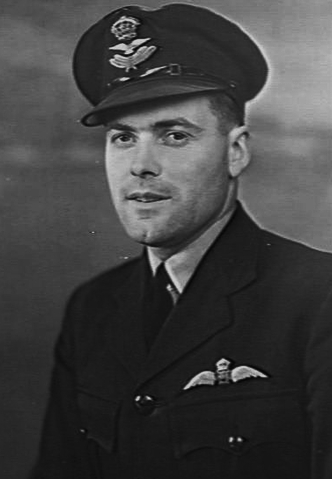
- Jack Newton in London, December 1943

Member of the Western Australian Legislative Assembly for Greenough
- In office 20 November 1943 – 14 January 1944
- Preceded by: William Patrick
- Succeeded by: David Brand

Personal details
- Born: 12 April 1916 Dongara, Western Australia
- Died: 14 January 1944 (aged 27) Warmeloh, Germany
- Cause of death: Killed in action
- Party: Labor Party

Military service
- Allegiance: Australia
- Branch/service: Royal Australian Air Force
- Years of service: 1941–1944
- Rank: Flight Lieutenant
- Battles/wars: Second World War
- Service no.: 415270

John Verdun Newton (12 April 1916 – 14 January 1944) was an Australian politician and Royal Australian Air Force (RAAF) officer. While serving with the RAAF in Europe during the Second World War, Newton was elected to the Parliament of Western Australia for the seat of Greenough at the 1943 state election, but was killed in action 55 days later.

While many other members of Australian parliaments (MPs) have simultaneously served in wars, Newton's tenure was unusual because he was: both preselected and elected while he was overseas; one of only a few serving members of Australian parliaments to fly on combat operations; (Note: "Thomas White (MHR, Balaclava, 1929–51; NAT/UAP/LIB), a veteran of World War I, joined the RAAF. He commanded a flying school and then in England filled senior administrative and training posts, and surreptitiously flew on several sorties as a second-pilot, before his discharge in 1944..." (Parliamentary Library [Australia], 2006–07, Commonwealth Members of Parliament who have served in war, pp. 9–10.)) neither sworn in, nor able to sit in parliament, and killed in action while he was an MP.

== Civilian life and political career ==
Jack Newton was the son of Mary Elizabeth Newton (née Doyle), and Edward Henry Newton, who had moved from Victoria to become farmers at Mingenew. (Note: Some sources give Mary Newton's maiden name as "Dingle", although official sources state that it was Doyle. (Marriage registration no. 6035, 1910, State of Victoria.))

As the Second World War broke out, Newton and his three brothers were working as sharefarmers, growing wheat. He was a member of the Wheat and Woolgrowers' Union (an association of small-scale farmers aligned to the political left). Jack Newton had reportedly also worked as a shearer and was a former member of the Australian Workers' Union.

When a State election was announced for 20 November 1943, Newton was pre-selected as the Labor Party (ALP) candidate for the seat of Greenough in the Legislative Assembly (lower house). He reportedly made his formal nomination by cable from London. Newton was elected with 52.81% (1,944 of 3,733 votes cast) of the first preferences, defeating the incumbent, William Patrick of the Country Party. Greenough became one of two seats in the lower house gained by the ALP as it retained government.

I want to thank you for having elected me your Parliamentary representative and for the high compliment you paid me. It is indeed a great honor [sic] you have conferred on me, and I hope I shall not disappoint you. The fact that you have elected me during my absence from the country fills me with gratitude and pride and I assure you I shall do my best to be worthy of your confidence.
* * *
But first ... I wish to complete the job I came here to do, and I know that you would like me to do that job well.
* * *
Happy Christmas, and victory and peace in the new year.

— Flt Lt John Newton, MLA for Greenough;
Calling Australian Towns, BBC Overseas Service, 1943.

Towards the end of 1943, Newton took part in a BBC Radio Overseas Service program Calling Australian Towns, giving a speech that he styled as an address to his constituents in Greenough (see excerpt, left).

Newton was officially listed as "missing in action" following a mission on the evening of 14 January 1944.

On 27 September 1945, the seat of Greenough was officially declared vacant. A by-election was held on 27 October 1945. The Labor candidate was Jack Newton's brother, Cecil Newton, who was defeated by the Liberal nominee, David Brand. (A veteran of the North African and Greek campaigns with the Australian Army, Brand later became Premier and retained Greenough until his retirement from politics in 1975.)

It was not unusual at the time for legislators to enter military service. In some Commonwealth parliaments that followed the Westminster system, there was a convention that if a Member of Parliament (MP) enlisted during wartime, they would be assigned a "pair": the party opposite would voluntarily withdraw one member from voting in parliament. And some other legislators had, like Newton, been elected while on active service. (Note: For example, Jack Seely was elected to the UK Parliament while serving with the British Army in the Boer War. Seely also retained a seat while he was at the front, during the First World War.)

Few serving members of Australian parliaments have flown on combat operations as military aviators. There may be only one other example: Thomas White was an RAAF staff officer in Europe during the Second World War, while continuing to represent a federal electorate in Victoria. According to the Australian Parliamentary Library, White "surreptitiously flew on several sorties as a second-pilot".

Many other members of the Western Australian Parliament have died in office and one other MP has been killed in action: Bart Stubbs (ALP; Subiaco) died during the First World War, while serving with the Australian Imperial Force in Belgium. However, Jack Newton's case is unusual because he was killed in action before he could take part in a parliamentary sitting. (Note: For example, while the UK's youngest MP at the time was also killed in action during 1944, the 25-year-old G. C. Gray had taken part in several sittings.)

== War service 1941–44 ==
In 1941, Newton was called up and enlisted in the Citizen Air Force (as the RAAF reserve was known at the time) on 17 August 1941, with the service number 415270. After training as a pilot at No. 9 Elementary Flying Training School (at RAAF Cunderdin) and No. 4 Service Flying Training School (RAAF Geraldton), Newton was awarded pilot's "wings" on 15 May 1942.

At the time, the Australian Defence Act prevented the posting of reservists and conscripts to units outside the South West Pacific theatre. Newton, however, volunteered for frontline service in British Royal Air Force (RAF) formations, under the Empire Air Training Scheme and was re-enlisted in the Permanent Air Force.

He was posted to the United Kingdom for operational training with RAF Bomber Command. For several months, Newton trained for night bombing with four-engined heavy bombers at No. 11 OTU (RAF Oakley, Buckinghamshire).

In late October 1943, Newton was promoted to Flight Lieutenant and posted to No. 90 Squadron RAF, at RAF Tuddenham in Suffolk. He captained Short Stirlings during raids on Germany, including raids on Kassel, Frankfurt and Bremen. His commanding officer at 90 Sqn, Wing Commander J. H. Giles, described Newton as: "An above average Officer who is an excellent leader of men."

In a newspaper interview published in November 1943, Newton mentioned that all of the other members of his original crew had been killed, while flying with another pilot. (This appears to have occurred while Newton was hospitalised due to illness.) He added that he expected to complete a tour of duty (which at the time comprised 30 sorties) "by Christmas", suggesting that he was flying, on average, three or four operations per week.

During November, Newton was transferred to No. 7 Squadron RAF, an Avro Lancaster Pathfinder unit, at RAF Oakington in Cambridgeshire, where he served until his death.

=== Killed in action, 1944 ===
On 14 January 1944, Newton was the captain of Lancaster B.III, JA905 (squadron code "MG-V"), (Note: JA905 was one of a batch of 550 Lancasters ordered from Avro (Chadderton) in late 1941 and delivered, as a B.III variant, with Rolls-Royce Merlin 38 engines. JA905 was delivered to No. 7 Squadron RAF in July 1943. It initially had the squadron code "MG-K", with which it took part in raids against Berlin (3/4 September 1943); Hanover (18/19 October 1943); Berlin (23/24 November, 26/27 November and 2/3 December 1943). JA905 was redesignated "MG-V" for its six and final sortie. It had flown a total of about 221 hours when it was lost on the evening of 14 January 1944. (Source: lostaircraft.com, 2012 Database LA Number: 3289 [21 August 2015.) which was recorded as taking off from Oakington at 16:53, with the crew to mark targets for the main bomber force around Braunschweig (Brunswick), in Lower Saxony. The other crew members were RAF personnel: Flt Lt Roy Bernard Wharmby (second pilot); Sgt W. H. Holmes (flight engineer); F/O A. R. Broadbent (navigator); Flt Sgt D. V. Bunting (bomb aimer); Sgt S. W. Bury (wireless operator/front gunner); P/O F. W. Harding (mid-upper gunner) and; F/O J. N. (Nigel) Richards (rear gunner). (Nigel Richards had partly inspired the main character in Cyril Connolly's pre-war novel The Rock Pool.)

The raid was to be Allied bombers' first major attack on Braunschweig; the operation called for 498 aircraft from Bomber Command to attack targets that included two Messerschmitt aircraft factories. As a relatively direct route was chosen, the pathfinders were detected by German radar at an early stage of the evening. Under a new tactical system known as Zahme Sau ("Tame Sow"), night fighters were directed at the bombers by Luftgau-Kommando XI (LgK XI; "Air District Command 11") in Hanover.

The operation failed, to the point that it was, according to historian Martin Middlebrook, "a minor disaster". A total of 38 Lancasters were lost, including 11 pathfinders – a fact that prevented accurate targeting, and as a result, no damage was done to any of the primary targets.

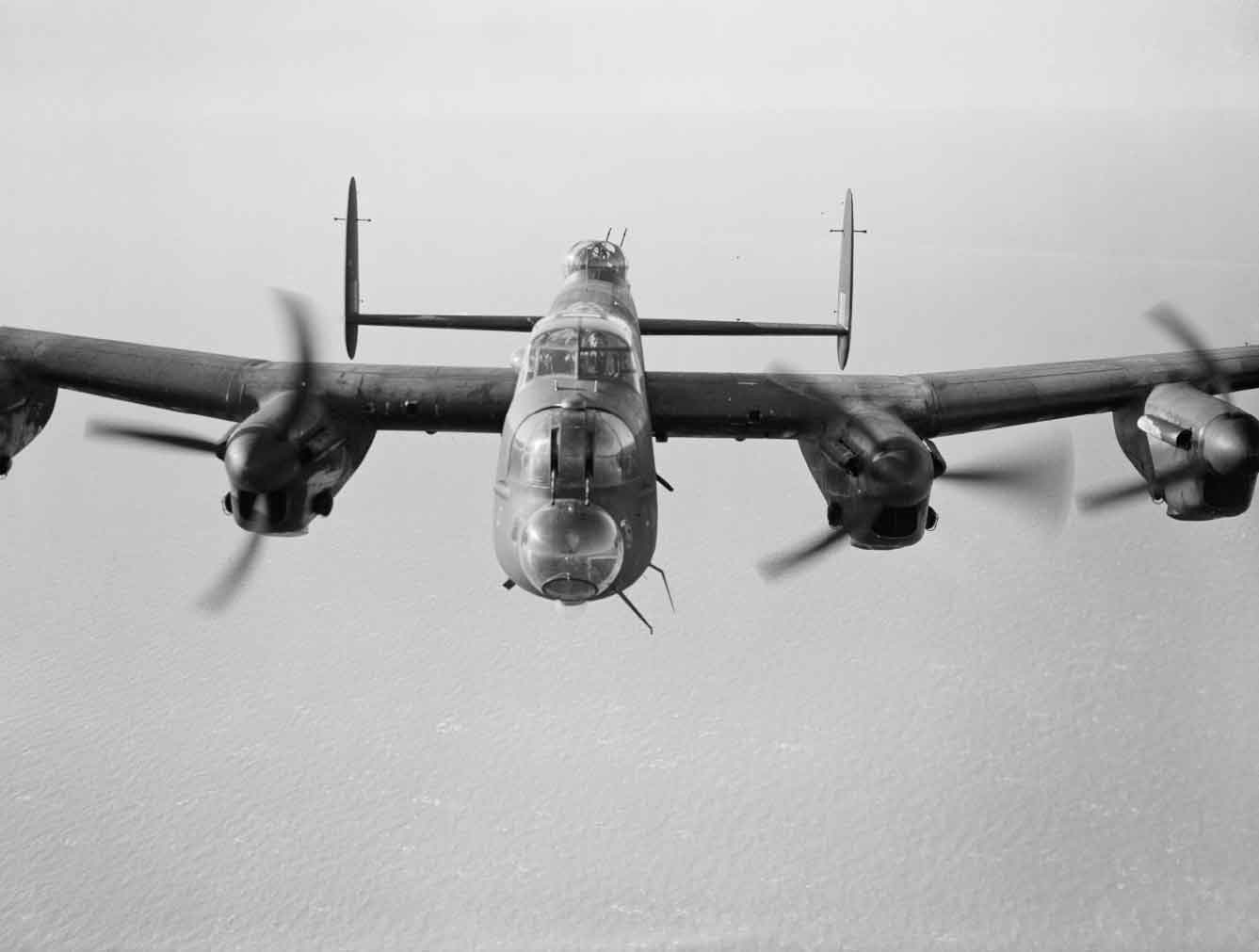
A Lancaster B.III similar to JA905 "MG-V"

JA905 was one of the aircraft that did not return and its entire crew was reported missing. Post-war investigations by the RAF established that JA905 and another Lancaster, B.III from 7 Squadron (JA935; "MG-O"), had crashed relatively close to each other, north-west of Braunschweig. The wreckage of both bombers had been subjected to massive explosions and/or intense fires, which prevented positive identification of either the aircraft or the remains of their crews.

Later research, by Stefan Ilsemann, has suggested that JA905 was attacked over Schwarmstedt by fighters, that most likely belonged to locally-based nightfighter unit NJG 3 – although NJG 2 also claimed to have shot down four-engined bombers in the same area that evening. The bomber was reportedly damaged several times by the fighters and caught fire; it then "lost height and completed a 180 degree turn", before apparently attempting a crash landing in a field. JA905 – evidently still carrying a full bomb load – descended too rapidly to make a controlled landing. At about 19:00 the bomber exploded violently as it hit the ground, in a field just inside the town limits of Warmeloh, but nearer to the village of Hope, about four miles (6.5 km) south of Schwarmstedt. According to Ilsemann: "Most of the roofs and windows in the village of Hope were damaged by the blast". (Note: The crash site is half a mile (800 metres) west of Hope, 800 feet (250 metres) north of the road from Vesbeck to Hope. (Aviation Research Neustadt, n.d. Warmeloh, op. cit..))

The crew of JA905 were initially buried, along with the wreckage, in the crater caused by the explosion. Following the end of the war, the Commonwealth War Graves Commission exhumed and reinterred their remains at the Hannover War Cemetery.

== Footnotes ==
Notes

Citations

Western Australian Legislative Assembly
Preceded by William Patrick	Member for Greenough; 1943–1944	Succeeded by David Brand
