= Grant Woodhams =

Australian politician (born 1952)

The Honourable Grant Woodhams AM
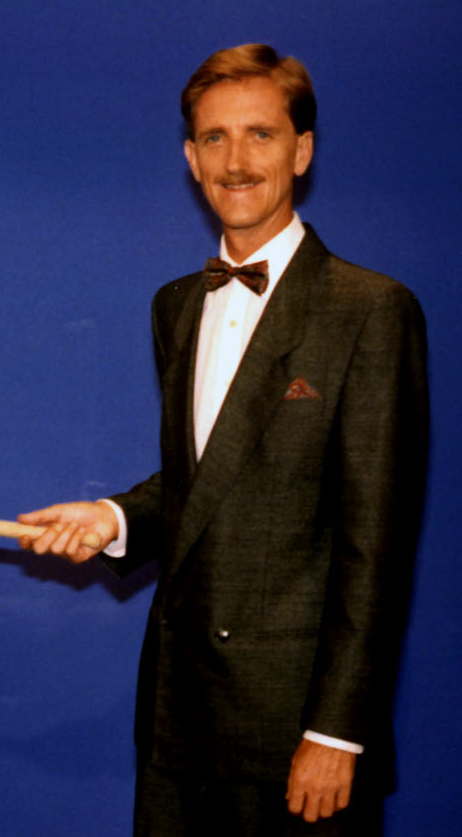

28th Speaker of the Western Australian Legislative Assembly
- In office 6 November 2008 – 9 March 2013
- Preceded by: Fred Riebeling
- Succeeded by: Michael Sutherland
- Constituency: Greenough (2005–2008); Moore (2008–2014)

Personal details
- Born: Grant Allen Woodhams; 7 August 1952 (age 73) Sydney
- Party: The Nationals
- Spouse: Gabrielle Woodhams
- Children: Phoebe Woodhams

Grant Allen Woodhams AM (born 7 August 1952 in Sydney, New South Wales) is a former Australian politician. He was the National Party of Australia member of the Western Australian Legislative Assembly from February 2005 to March 2013. He won the state elections for the district of Greenough in 2005 and the district of Moore in 2008.

== Career ==
Woodhams arrived in Western Australia in 1967. He was schooled in Perth and Albany, and graduated with a Bachelor of Arts from Murdoch University before starting work with ABC radio in Tasmania, among other states of Australia such as New South Wales. Woodhams left the ABC in 2004 to pursue a Master of Education degree.

Woodhams ran for and won the seat of Greenough in the 2005 state election, defeating the one-term Liberal MP Jamie Edwards. He was re-elected at the 2008 state election in the seat of Moore, which had expanded to include the area previously overseen by the Greenough district. Woodhams was elected Speaker of the Western Australian Legislative Assembly in November 2008. Woodhams's style of oratory became well known with and without the chamber, as he "occasionally gave his speeches as poems or songs", particularly in his budget reply speeches. He concluded his valedictory speech in 2012 with his own version of "Clancy of the Overflow", entitled "Woodie, the Speaker of the Overflow".

== Personal life ==
Woodhams announced in 2012 that he would retire to spend more time with his family. He was succeeded by Shane Love, who held the seat for the National Party in 2013.

Western Australian Legislative Assembly
Preceded by Jamie Edwards	Member for Greenough; 2005–2008	Succeeded by Seat abolished
Preceded by Gary Snook	Member for Moore; 2008–2013	Succeeded by Shane Love
Preceded by Fred Riebeling	Speaker of the Western Australian Legislative Assembly; 2008–2013	Succeeded by Michael Sutherland
