= Electoral district of Greenough =

Former state electoral district of Western Australia

Greenough Western Australia—Legislative Assembly
- State: Western Australia
- Dates current: 1890–2008
- Namesake: Shire of Greenough

Greenough was an electoral district of the Legislative Assembly in the Australian state of Western Australia from 1890 to 2008.

Greenough was one of the original 30 seats contested at the 1890 colonial election. The district was based in the northern part of Western Australia's Wheatbelt region. It was abolished in 2008 when the number of rural districts was reduced.

== Geography ==
Greenough was a rural electorate, surrounding but not including the coastal city of Geraldton. At its abolition, it included the towns of Kalbarri, Northampton, Mullewa, Morawa, Dongara and Three Springs.

== History ==
Although held on occasion by Labor, Greenough was typically a conservative seat. By the time of its abolition, it was a very safe non-Labor seat. The district was captured by the National Party when it was last contested at the 2005 state election. That ended the Liberal Party's 60-year hold on the seat.

Greenough was abolished ahead of the 2008 state election, as a result of the reduction in rural seats made necessary by the one vote one value reforms. Its former territory was split between the districts of Geraldton and Moore. Following Greenough's abolition, the sitting National MP, Grant Woodhams, contested the seat of Moore.

== Members for Greenough ==
Member	Party	Term
William Traylen	Opposition	1890–1897
Richard Pennefather	Ind. Ministerial	1897–1901
Patrick Stone	Independent	1901–1904
John Nanson	Ministerial	1904–1905
Patrick Stone	Ministerial	1905–1908
John Nanson	Ministerial	1908–1914
John Cunningham	Country	1914–1917
Henry Maley	Country	1917–1924
Maurice Kennedy	Labor	1924–1930
William Patrick	Country	1930–1943
John Newton	Labor	1943–1945
David Brand	Liberal	1945–1949
David Brand	LCL	1949–1968
David Brand	Liberal	1968–1975
Reg Tubby	Liberal	1975–1989
Kevin Minson	Liberal	1989–2001
Jamie Edwards	Liberal	2001–2005
Grant Woodhams	National	2005–2008
