= William Patrick Jr. =

Australian politician

William Patrick

Deputy Leader of the Country Party in Western Australia
- In office 21 February 1936 – 10 December 1943
- Leader: Charles Latham; Arthur Watts
- Preceded by: Percy Ferguson
- Succeeded by: Lindsay Thorn

Member of the Legislative Assembly of Western Australia
- In office 12 April 1930 – 20 November 1943
- Preceded by: Maurice Kennedy
- Succeeded by: John Newton
- Constituency: Greenough

Personal details
- Born: 10 May 1880 Stevenston, Ayrshire, Scotland
- Died: 5 August 1968 (aged 88) Belmont, Western Australia, Australia
- Party: Country

William Patrick (10 May 1880 – 5 August 1968) was an Australian politician who was a Country Party member of the Legislative Assembly of Western Australia from 1930 to 1943, representing the seat of Greenough. He was deputy leader of the Country Party from 1936 to 1943.

== Early life ==
Patrick was born in Stevenston, Ayrshire, Scotland, to Jane (née Walker) and William Patrick. His father was also a member of parliament. The family moved to Australia in 1881, settling in Kapunda, South Australia. Patrick attended Roseworthy Agricultural College, and later joined his father in Western Australia, buying a farm in the Northampton district. He served on the Northampton Road Board from 1918 to 1930, including as chairman for four years.

== Politics ==
Patrick first stood for parliament at the 1924 state election, but lost to Labor's Maurice Kennedy. He successfully recontested Greenough against Kennedy at the 1930 election, and was re-elected three more times (including unopposed in 1939). In February 1936, Patrick was elected deputy leader of the Country Party under Charles Latham, replacing Percy Ferguson. He also became deputy Leader of the Opposition, as the Country Party had more MPs than the Liberal Party (their coalition partner) at that point. However, at the 1943 election Patrick unexpectedly lost his seat to a Labor candidate, John Newton. Newton was a 27-year-old serving RAAF officer, and was killed in action before taking his place in parliament. Patrick attempted to re-entered parliament at the 1946 Legislative Council elections, but lost to Charles Simpson of the Liberal Party. He eventually retired to Perth, dying there in August 1968 (aged 88). He had married Sarah Maude Sinclair in 1932, but had no children.

== See also ==
- Electoral results for the district of Greenough
