= Members of the Western Australian Legislative Council, 1874–1880 =

This is a list of members of the Western Australian Legislative Council from September 1874 to February 1880. The Council had 21 members. Fourteen were elected and seven were appointed by the Crown. Three of the appointed members sat as the Colonial Secretary, the Attorney-General and the Surveyor-General. The other four were private citizens chosen by the Governor. They did not represent a district.

An ordinance of 1870 (33 Vict, No. 13) gave the Council 18 members. The Legislative Council Act Amendment Act 1873 (37 Vict, No. 22) raised this to 21. It added one appointed member and two elected seats, for the new districts of Murray and Williams and the North.

Governor Frederick Weld dissolved the previous Council on 6 August 1874 to put the question of responsible government to the voters. The results for every district except the North were announced on 13 October, and for the North on 24 October. The new Council first met on 18 November 1874 and re-elected Luke Leake as Speaker. It sat for the last time on 8 October 1879 and its term then ran out. Writs for a new election were issued on 10 January 1880. The results for every district except the North were announced on 28 February.

Name	District/Office	Years in office
Frederick Barlee^{[e]}	Colonial Secretary	1855–1875
Wallace Bickley^{[g]}	Nominee	1872–1876
Edmund Birch^{[c]}	Perth	1873–1875
Charles Broadhurst^{[g]}	Nominee	1874–1875
Edmund Ralph Brockman^{[i]}	Swan	1878–1880; 1887–1889; 1890–1891
Maitland Brown^{[b]}^{[h]}	Geraldton	1870–1872; 1874–1876; 1876–1886
Lockier Burges^{[k]}	Nominee	1879–1884
Thomas Burges^{[b]}	North	1874–1878; 1885–1887; 1890–1893
William Burges^{[g]}	Nominee	1875–1876
Septimus Burt^{[k]}	Nominee	1874–1879; 1880–1886; 1886; 1888–1890
Thomas Carey^{[j]}	Vasse	1872–1874; 1878–1884
Sir Thomas Cockburn-Campbell	Albany	1872–1874; 1874–1889; 1889–1890; 1890–1892
Charles Crowther	Greenough	1873–1887
Malcolm Fraser	Surveyor-General	1870–1886; 1887–1890
Richard Gale^{[j]}	Vasse	1874–1878
George Glyde	Nominee	1874–1879; 1882–1885; 1892–1894
Roger Goldsworthy^{[e]}	Colonial Secretary	1877–1880
Edward Hamersley^{[f]}	Toodyay	1874–1875; 1880–1884; 1890–1894
Samuel Hamersley	Murray and Williams	1874–1880; 1890
Richard Hardey^{[g]}	Nominee	1876–1880; 1890–1896
Charles Harper^{[b]}	North	1878–1880; 1884–1890
Henry Hocking^{[a]}	Attorney-General	1873–1874; 1875–1879
George Walpole Leake^{[a]}	Attorney-General	1874–1875; 1879; 1880–1881; 1883; 1890–1894
Sir Luke Leake	Perth	1870–1886
James Lee Steere	Wellington	1868–1880; 1880–1884; 1885–1890
Anthony O'Grady Lefroy^{[e]}	Colonial Secretary	1856–1870; 1875–1877
William Marmion	Fremantle	1870–1890
John Monger^{[d]}	York	1870–1875; 1890–1892
Joseph Monger^{[d]}	York	1875–1880
Walter Padbury^{[i]}	Swan	1872–1877
Stephen Henry Parker^{[c]}	Perth	1878–1890; 1892–1897
Stephen Stanley Parker^{[g]}	Nominee	1876–1885
William Silas Pearse	Fremantle	1872–1880; 1884–1890
George Randell^{[c]}	Perth	1875–1878; 1880–1890; 1893–1894; 1897–1910
George Shenton^{[f]}	Toodyay	1870–1873; 1875–1906
Edward Stone^{[a]}	Attorney-General	1879–1880; 1880–1882

== Notes ==
^{a} From 30 June 1874 to 16 January 1875, George Walpole Leake sat in the Council as Acting Attorney-General in place of Henry Hocking. Hocking resigned on 25 February 1879 and Leake took over again on 1 March. Leake was made Acting Chief Justice on 22 November 1879 and Edward Stone replaced him as Acting Attorney-General on 24 November. Stone held the office until 21 March 1880. The Council did not sit in that time.
^{b} Maitland Brown was elected for both Geraldton and the North District at the general election. He chose to sit for Geraldton. Thomas Burges was elected for the North District on 31 December 1874. Burges resigned on 31 January 1878 and Charles Harper won the by-election on 28 March 1878.
^{c} On 16 January 1875, Edmund Birch, one of the two members for Perth, died. George Randell won the by-election on 25 January 1875. Randell resigned on 1 May 1878 and Stephen Henry Parker won the by-election on 22 May 1878.
^{d} In June 1875, John Monger, the member for York, resigned. Joseph Monger won the by-election on 23 June 1875.
^{e} Frederick Barlee went on leave on 24 July 1875 and Anthony O'Grady Lefroy became Acting Colonial Secretary. Lefroy took Barlee's place in the Council on 24 November 1875. Roger Goldsworthy became Colonial Secretary on 30 August 1877 and replaced him.
^{f} On 6 October 1875, Edward Hamersley, the member for Toodyay, resigned. George Shenton won the by-election on 10 November 1875.
^{g} On 24 November 1875, nominee member Charles Broadhurst resigned. William Burges was nominated on the same day. Another nominee, Wallace Bickley, died on 30 June 1876, and Burges resigned on 25 July 1876. Richard Hardey and Stephen Stanley Parker were nominated on 25 July 1876.
^{h} In about March 1876, Maitland Brown resigned as the member for Geraldton. He won the seat back at the by-election on 22 July 1876.
^{i} On 1 December 1877, Walter Padbury, the member for Swan, resigned. Edmund Ralph Brockman won the by-election on 8 January 1878.
^{j} On 16 February 1878, Richard Gale, the member for Vasse, resigned. Thomas Carey, who had lost the seat to Gale in 1874, won the by-election on 28 March 1878.
^{k} On 14 January 1879, Lockier Burges was nominated to the Council in place of Septimus Burt.
