= Members of the Western Australian Legislative Council, 1872–1874 =

This is a list of members of the Western Australian Legislative Council from June 1872 to September 1874. The chamber had 18 members, as specified by the Legislative Council Act 1870 (33 Vict, No. 13). Section 1 of this Act specified that a minimum of one-third of the Council would be appointed by the Crown. Three of these were official nominees who were part of the Continuous Ministry—namely the Colonial Secretary, Attorney-General and the Surveyor-General—while the remaining three were "non-official nominees". All other positions were elected.

An amendment proclaimed on 15 January 1874 expanded the Council from 18 to 21 seats, adding two elected and one nominee member.

Name	District/Office	Years in office
Sir Frederick Barlee	Colonial Secretary	1855–1875
Wallace Bickley	Nominee	1872–1876
Alfred Bussell	Nominee	1872–1874
Thomas Carey	Vasse	1872–1874; 1878–1884
Julien Carr	Perth	1868–1873
Thomas Cockburn-Campbell^{[2]}	Nominee	1872–1889; 1890–1892
Charles Crowther^{[5]}	Greenough	1873–1886
Charles Dempster^{[4]}	Toodyay	1873–1874; 1894–1907
James Drummond^{[4]}	Toodyay	1870–1873
Malcolm Fraser	Surveyor-General	1870–1886; 1887–1890
George Glyde	nominee	1874–1879; 1882–1885
William Locke Brockman^{[3]}	Swan	1839–1840; 1868–1870; 1872
Albert Hassell	Albany	1871–1874
Sir Henry Hocking^{[1]}	Attorney-General	1873–1874; 1875–1879
George Walpole Leake^{[1]}	Attorney-General	1872–1873; 1874–1875; 1879; 1880–1881; 1883
Luke Leake	Perth	1870–1886
James George Lee-Steere	Wellington	1868–1880; 1885–1890
Major Logue	Geraldton	1870–1874
William Marmion^{[2]}	Nominee/Fremantle	1870–1890
John Monger	York	1870–1875
Edward Newman^{[2]}	Fremantle	1870–1872
Walter Padbury^{[3]}	Swan	1872–1877
William Silas Pearse	Fremantle	1872–1880; 1884–1890
George Shenton^{[5]}	Greenough	1870–1873, 1875–1906
Robert Walcott^{[1]}	Attorney-General	1870–1872

== Notes ==
^{1} In December 1872, Attorney-General Robert Walcott resigned. George Walpole Leake was appointed to replace him in the Council until Henry Hocking took up his duties in March 1873.
^{2} On 25 November 1872, Edward Newman, one of the two members for Fremantle, died. At the resulting by-election on 26 December, William Marmion, already a nominee member of the Council, was elected. He transferred to the elective seat, and Thomas Cockburn-Campbell was nominated in his stead.
^{3} On 28 November 1872, William Locke Brockman, the member for Swan, died. At the close of nominations on 26 December for the resulting by-election, Walter Padbury was returned unopposed.
^{4} On 8 February 1873, James Drummond, the member for Toodyay, died. At the close of nominations on 4 March for the resulting by-election, Charles Dempster was returned unopposed.
^{5} On 5 July 1873, the result of the 1872 election for Greenough was voided, and George Shenton ceased to be a member of the Council. At a by-election on 22 July 1873, Charles Crowther was elected.

== Sources ==
- Black, David (1992). Legislative Council of Western Australia, elections and electoral law 1867-1890. Perth: Parliamentary History Project. ISBN 0-7309-5007-7.
