= Members of the Western Australian Legislative Council, 1870–1872 =

This is a list of members of the Western Australian Legislative Council from October 1870 to June 1872. The chamber had 18 members, as specified by the Legislative Council Act 1870 (33 Vict, No. 13). Section 1 of this Act specified that a minimum of one-third of the council would be appointed by the Crown. Three of these were official nominees who were part of the Continuous Ministry—namely the Colonial Secretary, Attorney-General and the Surveyor-General—while the remaining three were "non-official nominees".

Of the 12 elected representatives, two members each represented Perth and Fremantle, while the remainder represented the rural districts. Franchise was limited to free men who owned £100 of freehold property or paid £10 per annum rent. An amendment proclaimed on 17 August 1871 allowed former prisoners who had been granted a conditional pardon and who met the above conditions to vote.

Name	District/Office	Years in office
Sir Frederick Barlee	Colonial Secretary	1855–1875
Maitland Brown	Nominee	1870–1872; 1874–1876
John Bussell	Vasse	1870–1872
Julien Carr	Perth	1868–1873
James Drummond	Toodyay	1870–1873
Malcolm Fraser	Surveyor-General	1870–1886; 1887–1890
Thomas Gull	Swan	1870–1872
Albert Hassell^{[1]}	Albany	1871–1874
Luke Leake	Perth	1870–1886
James George Lee-Steere	Wellington	1868–1880; 1885–1890
Major Logue	Geraldton	1870–1874
John McKail^{[1]}	Albany	1870–1871
William Marmion	Nominee	1870–1890
John Monger	York	1870–1875
William Dalgety Moore	Fremantle	1870–1872
Edward Newman	Fremantle	1870–1872
Samuel Phillips	Nominee	1857–1872
George Shenton	Greenough	1870–1873, 1875–1906
Robert Walcott	Attorney-General	1870–1872

== Notes ==
^{1} On 4 May 1871, John McKail, the member for Albany, resigned. At the close of nominations on 23 May for the resulting by-election, Albert Young Hassell was returned unopposed.

== Sources ==
- Black, David (1992). Legislative Council of Western Australia, elections and electoral law 1867-1890. Perth: Parliamentary History Project. ISBN 0-7309-5007-7.
