= Members of the Western Australian Legislative Council, 1890–1894 =

This is a list of members of the Western Australian Legislative Council from December 1890 until July 1894.

Prior to the passage of the Constitution Act 1889, Western Australia had a partly elected and partly nominated Legislative Council. The Act created a fully elective Western Australian Legislative Assembly as a separate house, and a 15-seat Council whose members were nominated by the Governor of Western Australia. It was anticipated by Part III of the Constitution that the Council would remain purely nominative until the colony had reached a population of 60,000—seen as a distant goal with an 1888 population of 43,814 and the levelling off of earlier growth. However, due to the gold rush which saw thousands of people migrate from other Australian colonies and from overseas, the population reached 64,923 by 31 December 1893. The Constitution Act Amendment Act 1893 was passed to transform the Council into an elective house of 21 members on a restricted franchise, effective from the 1894 elections.

Name	Date appointed	Date ceased
Josceline Amherst	24 December 1890	16 July 1894
Harry Anstey	23 August 1893	16 July 1894
Edmund Ralph Brockman	24 December 1890	9 December 1891 (resigned)
Thomas Burges	24 December 1890	7 August 1893 (died)
Robert Edwin Bush	24 December 1890	17 July 1893 (resigned)
Hon Sir Thomas Cockburn-Campbell	24 December 1890	27 September 1892 (died)
Daniel Keen Congdon	8 March 1892	16 July 1894
George Glyde	8 March 1892	16 July 1894
McKenzie Grant	24 December 1890	17 July 1893 (resigned)
John Winthrop Hackett	29 December 1890	16 July 1894
Edward Hamersley	24 December 1890	16 July 1894
Richard Watson Hardey	31 December 1890	16 July 1894
John Hassell	3 August 1893	16 July 1984
Edward Hooley	12 December 1891	16 July 1894
George Walpole Leake	24 December 1890	16 July 1894
John Monger	24 December 1890	23 February 1892 (died)
William Dalgety Moore	24 December 1890	4 February 1892 (resigned)
James Morrison	24 December 1890	16 July 1894
Stephen Henry Parker	11 October 1892	16 July 1894
George Randell	17 July 1893	16 July 1894
Sir George Shenton	24 December 1890	16 July 1894
John Arthur Wright	24 December 1890	16 July 1894

== Sources ==
- Black, David (1991). Legislative Council of Western Australia : membership register, electoral law and statistics, 1890-1989. Perth: Parliamentary History Project. ISBN 0-7309-3641-4.
