= Hamersley family =

Wealthy family who settled in Western Australia

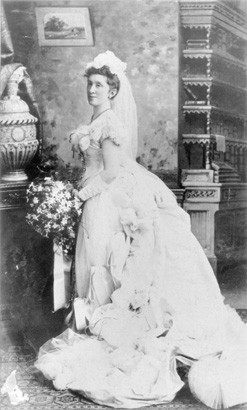
Margaret, Lady Forrest, née Hamersley, 1876

The Hamersley family were a wealthy and well-connected family of early settlers in the colony of Western Australia. Members of the Hamersley family emigrated to Western Australia from England in 1837.

Prominent members and connections of the family included:

- Edward Hamersley, pastoralist and MLC;
  - his sister Frances, who married William Locke Brockman;
    - their son Edmund Ralph Brockman;
    - their son Henry Brockman;
  - his son Edward, pastoralist and MLC;
    - his wife Jane, sister of Andrew and Charles Dempster;
  - his son Samuel, pastoralist, explorer, MLA and MLC;
    - his wife Matilda, sister of Maitland Brown;
    - his son Vernon, MLC;
  - his daughter Margaret Elvire, who married Sir John Forrest;
  - his daughter Flora, who married Frederic North;
    - their son Charles North;
  - his nephew Malcolm, who accompanied John Forrest on his 1869 exploring expedition.

A number of places in Western Australia have been named after the Hamersley family. John Septimus Roe named the Hamersley River in their honour in 1848–49; and Francis Thomas Gregory also named the Hamersley Range in the Pilbara region in their honour. John Forrest, during his 1869 exploring expedition, named Mount Bevon, Mount George, Mount Malcolm, Mount Flora, Mount Elvire and Mount Margaret, all in honour of members of the Hamersley family.

The Hamersley Ward of the city of Stirling (formerly Perth Road Board), the suburb of Hamersley, settled in the late 1960s, a golf course in North Beach, and at least ten streets in the Perth suburbs of North Beach and Watermans Bay are named after members of the family. Their 19th-century home, Hamersley House in Beachton Street, North Beach was demolished in 1962.
