= Edmund Ralph Brockman =

Australian politician

Edmund Brockman

Member of the Legislative Council of Western Australia
- In office 8 January 1878 – 13 February 1880
- Preceded by: Walter Padbury
- Succeeded by: E. T. Hooley
- Constituency: Swan
- In office 10 June 1887 – 7 March 1889
- Preceded by: None (new creation)
- Succeeded by: Sir Thomas Cockburn-Campbell
- Constituency: None (nominated by governor)
- In office 24 December 1890 – 9 December 1891
- Preceded by: None (new creation)
- Succeeded by: E. T. Hooley
- Constituency: None (nominated by governor)

Personal details
- Born: 22 October 1828 Kent, England
- Died: 17 September 1908 (aged 79) Guildford, Western Australia, Australia
- Spouse: Elizabeth Debra Slade (m.1852–1908; his death)

Edmund Ralph Brockman (22 October 1828 – 17 September 1908) was an Australian farmer and politician who was a member of the Legislative Council of Western Australia on three occasions – from 1878 to 1880, from 1887 to 1889, and from 1890 to 1891.

Brockman was born in Kent, England, to Frances Elizabeth (née Hamersley) and William Locke Brockman. His parents moved to Western Australia when he was an infant, arriving in the Swan River Colony in January 1830 (just months after its establishment). Several members of Brockman's family also became members of parliament – his younger brother, Henry Brockman; his uncle, Edward Hamersley Sr.; and two of his first cousins, Edward Hamersley Jr. and Samuel Hamersley. At the age of 18, Brockman took over the management of Seabrook, a property on the Mortlock River which his father had bought for him. He moved to Herne Hill (on the Swan River) after his father's death in 1872, and in 1875 was elected chairman of the Swan Road Board. He served in the position until 1877, and then again from 1879 to 1883.

Prominent in agricultural circles, Brockman was elected to the Legislative Council at an 1878 by-election for the seat of Swan, replacing Walter Padbury. He served for just over two years, but was defeated in 1880 by E. T. Hooley. Brockman returned to parliament in June 1887, when he was nominated to the Legislative Council by the governor, Sir Frederick Broome. He retired from the Legislative Council in March 1889, but was re-appointed in December 1890, following the council's reconstitution as an upper house (rather than a unicameral chamber). Brockman's final period in parliament lasted for just under a year, as he resigned to accept an office of profit (a government contract to supply hay). He eventually retired to Kenwick, and died in September 1908, aged 79. Brockman had married Elizabeth Deborah Slade in 1852, with whom he had six children. One of his sons was Frederick Slade Drake-Brockman, who was a Surveyor-General of Western Australia.
