= Edward Hamersley =

Edward Hamersley may refer to:

- Edward Hamersley (senior) (1810–1874), pastoralist in Western Australia
- Edward Hamersley (junior) (1835–1921), son and also a pastoralist in Western Australia
