= Henry Brockman (Australian politician) =

Australian politician

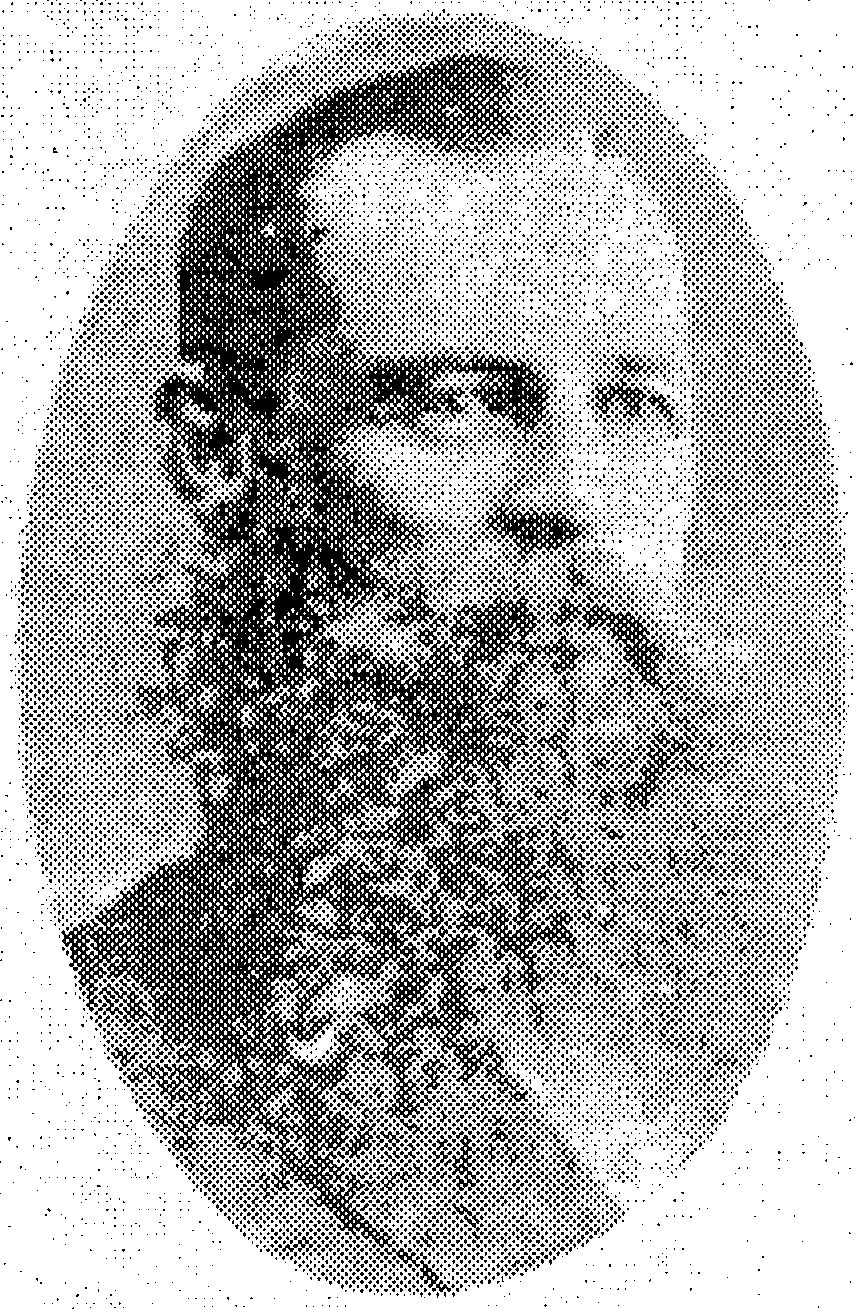
- Born: 21 June 1845; Herne Hill, Western Australia, Australia
- Died: 7 November 1916 (aged 71); South Perth, Western Australia, Australia
- Resting place: Karrakatta Cemetery
- Occupations: Farmer; Politician
- Spouse: Anna Louisa de Burgh (m 1874–1916; his death)
- Parent(s): William Locke Brockman; Ann Frances Elizabeth (Hamersley) Brockman
- Relatives: Edward Hamersley (Snr) (uncle); Edward (Jnr) (cousin); Samuel Hamersley (cousin)

Henry Brockman (21 June 1845 – 7 November 1916) was an Australian politician. He served as the Member of the Western Australian Legislative Council from 1884 to 1889.

== Biography ==
=== Early life ===
Henry Brockman was born on 21 June 1845 in Herne Hill, Western Australia. His father was William Locke Brockman and his mother, Ann Frances Elizabeth née Hamersley. He was also a nephew of Edward Hamersley (Snr), and a cousin of Edward (Jnr) and Samuel Hamersley. He was educated in England.

=== Career ===
In 1864, he took up land as a farmer and pastoralist near Gingin, Western Australia. From 1870, he was involved in exporting horses to India. On 24 October 1884, he was elected to the Western Australian Legislative Council seat of Swan. He held the seat until the election of 30 January 1889, which he did not contest. From 1886, he had invested heavily in the Midland Railway, ultimately suffering heavy losses. In 1893 he was elected Mayor of Gingin, which position he held until 1903, when he sold his land and retired to Perth.

=== Personal life and death ===
On 19 March 1874, he married Anna Louisa de Burgh in a ceremony at Guildford, Western Australia; he would later become brother-in-law to Charles Harper and James Morrison. He died in South Perth on 7 November 1916, and was buried in the Karrakatta Cemetery.

== Notes ==
- Black, David; Bolton, Geoffrey (2001a). Biographical Register of Members of the Parliament of Western Australia. Vol. One: 1870–1930 (Revised ed.). Parliament House: Parliament of Western Australia. ISBN 0730738140.
