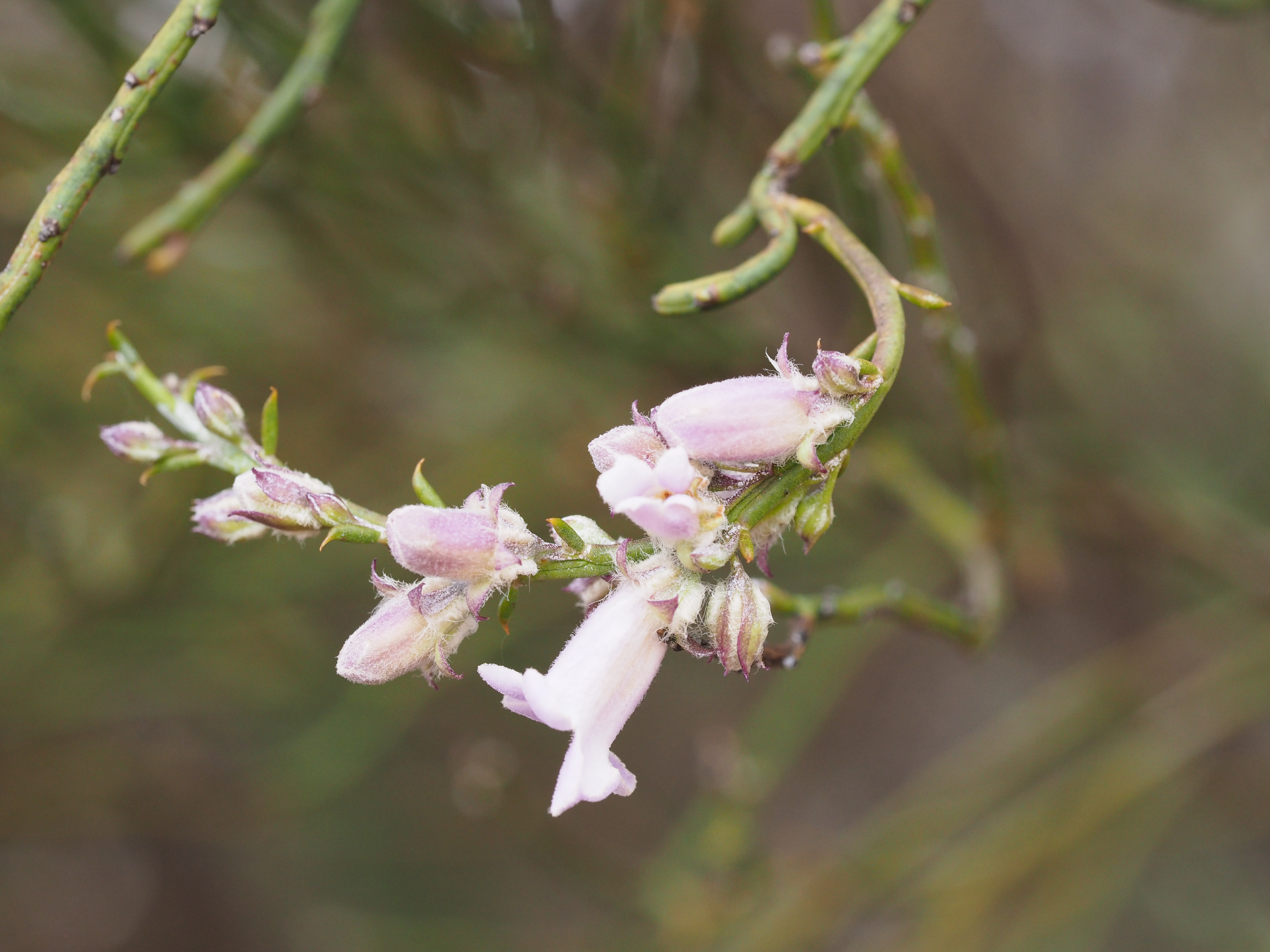
- Eremophila dempsteri leaves and flowers

Scientific classification
- Kingdom: Plantae
- Clade: Tracheophytes
- Clade: Angiosperms
- Clade: Eudicots
- Clade: Asterids
- Order: Lamiales
- Family: Scrophulariaceae
- Genus: Eremophila
- Species: E. dempsteri

Binomial name
- Eremophila dempsteri F.Muell.

Synonyms
- Bondtia dempsteri Kuntze orth. var.; Bontia dempsteri (F.Muell.) Kuntze; Pholidia dempsteri (F.Muell.) Kraenzl.

= Eremophila dempsteri =

Species of flowering plant

Eremophila dempsteri is a flowering plant in the figwort family, Scrophulariaceae and is endemic to the south of Western Australia. It is an erect shrub with many upright stems, short, hooked leaves, and pinkish-purple to white flowers with distinctive woolly sepals.

== Description ==
Eremophila dempsteri is an erect shrub which grows to a height of 1–4 m (3–10 ft) and has many erect branches, giving the plant a broom-like appearance. The branches have many raised resin glands making them sticky near the tips and there are grooves under the leaf bases. The leaves are arranged alternately along the branches and are dark green, mostly 2–7.5 mm (0.08–0.3 in) long, 0.5–1.3 mm (0.02–0.05 in) wide and have a curved, hooked tip.

The flowers are borne singly or in pairs in leaf axils on stalks 2–4 mm (0.08–0.2 in) long which are often sticky or scaly due to resin. There are 5 slightly oblong to lance-shaped sepals which are hairy on the inner surface and margins and are 4–6.5 mm (0.2–0.3 in) long. The petals are 9.5–13 mm (0.4–0.5 in) long and joined at their lower end to form a tube. The petal tube is usually lilac-coloured to white and lacks spots. The outside of the petal tube and petal lobes are hairy. The 4 stamens are fully enclosed in the petal tube. Flowering occurs from July to October and is followed by fruits, which are oval-shaped, hairy, and 3–5 mm (0.1–0.2 in) long.

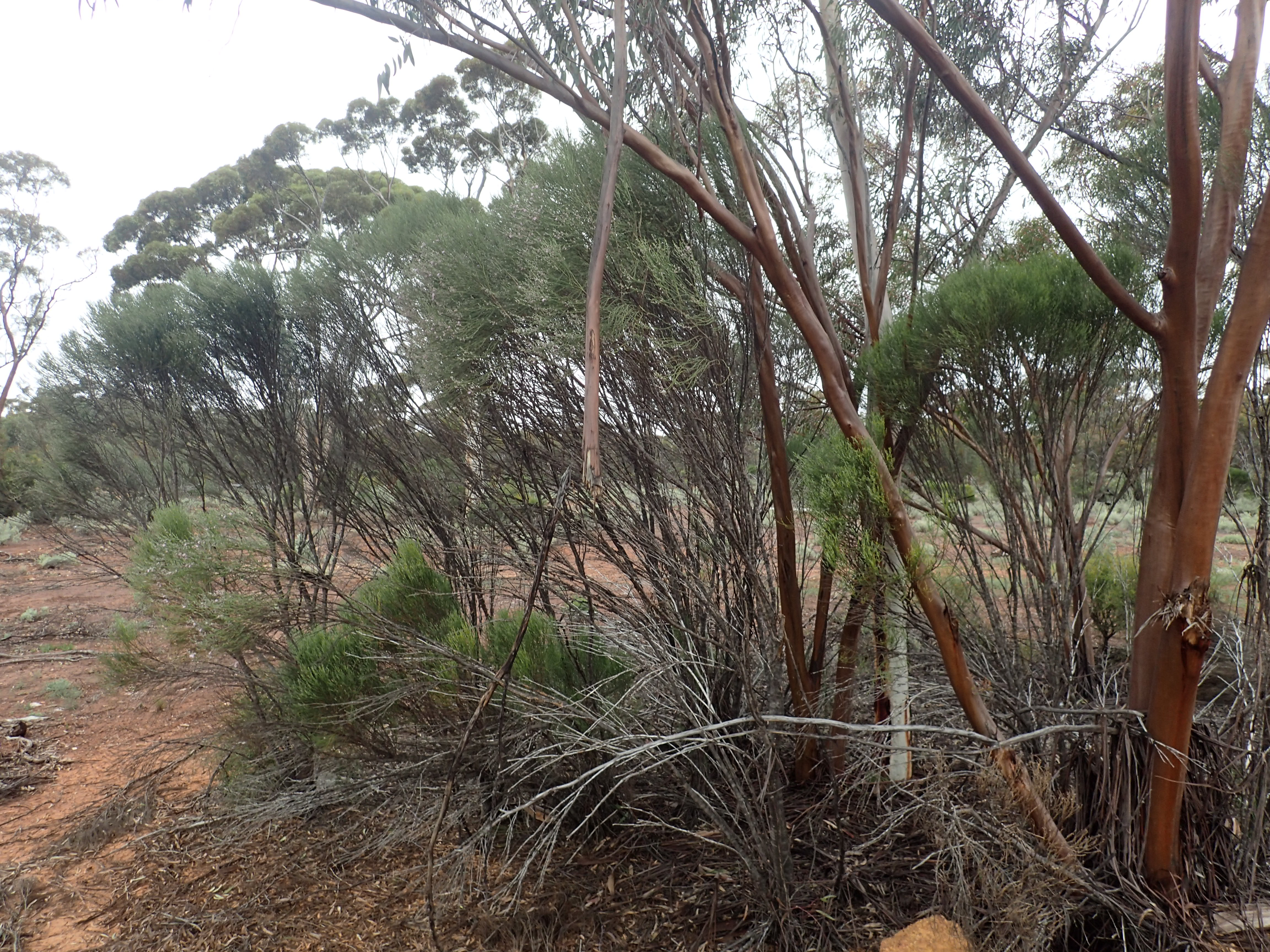
E. dempsteri growing near Widgiemooltha

== Taxonomy and naming ==
Eremophila dempsteri was first formally described by Ferdinand von Mueller in 1876, and the description was published in Fragmenta phytographiae Australiae. The specific epithet (dempsteri) honours Andrew Dempster, who was the son of the politician, Charles Dempster and who was an explorer and collector of the type specimen.

== Distribution and habitat ==
This eremophila is common between Balladonia, Coolgardie, Hyden, Cocklebiddy and Salmon Gums in woodland, growing in red-brown and calcareous soils.

== Conservation status ==
Eremophila dempsteri is classified as "not threatened" by the Government of Western Australia Department of Parks and Wildlife.

== Use in horticulture ==
This eremophila has unusual flowers and an attractive habit, making it useful as a specimen shrub. Its growth form also allows it to be used with other shrubs as a screening plant. It can be propagated from cuttings, which may take a year to strike, or by grafting onto Myoporum species. It will grow in most soils in full sun or part shade, is tolerant of drought, and is not damaged by severe frosts.
