= Grevillea dolichopoda =

Conservation status
- Least Concern (IUCN 3.1)

Scientific classification
- Kingdom: Plantae
- Clade: Embryophytes
- Clade: Tracheophytes
- Clade: Spermatophytes
- Clade: Angiosperms
- Clade: Eudicots
- Order: Proteales
- Family: Proteaceae
- Genus: Grevillea
- Species: G. dolichopoda

Binomial name
- Grevillea dolichopoda (McGill.) Olde & Marriott

Synonyms
- Grevillea disjuncta 'longer-leaved form'; Grevillea disjuncta subsp. dolichopoda McGill.

Species of shrub native to Western Australia

Grevillea dolichopoda is a species of flowering plant in the family Proteaceae and is endemic to the south-west of Western Australia. It is a low-lying shrub with linear to more or less cylindrical leaves and groups up to four red and orange flowers with a red, green-tipped style.

== Description ==
Grevillea dolichopoda is a low-lying shrub that typically grows to a height of 30–60 cm (12–24 in). Its leaves are linear to more or less cylindrical, 25–70 mm (0.98–2.76 in) long and 1–2.5 mm (0.039–0.098 in) wide with the edges rolled under, enclosing the lower surface. The flowers are arranged in groups of up to four, 20–40 mm (0.79–1.57 in) long on a hairy rachis about 1 mm (0.039 in) long. The flowers are red and orange with a green-tipped, red style, the pistil 23–24 mm (0.91–0.94 in) long. Flowering occurs from April to November and the fruit is an oval follicle about 12 mm (0.47 in) long with a few shaggy hairs.

== Taxonomy ==
This grevillea was first formally described in 1986 by Donald McGillivray who gave it the name Grevillea disjuncta subsp. dolichopoda in his book New names in Grevillea (Proteaceae) from specimens collected near Ongerup in 1976. In 1993 Peter M. Olde and Neil R. Marriott raised the subspecies to species status as Grevillea dolichopoda. The specific epithet (dolichopoda) means "long foot".

== Distribution and habitat ==
Grevillea dolichopoda grows in heath or mallee shrubland from Nyabing to the Gairdner River, between Varley and Ravensthorpe, and from East Mount Barren to the lower Hamersley River in the Esperance Plains and Mallee biogeographic regions of south-western Western Australia.

== Conservation status ==
Grevillea dolichopoda has been listed as least concern on the IUCN Red List of Threatened Species. It is locally common within its distribution and its population is believed to be mostly stable. Historical habitat destruction and land clearing for agriculture has reduced the range and habitat of the species. Current threats include mining activity and associated infrastructure such as the development of roads within part of its distribution in the Ravensthorpe region, though these threats are not severe enough to warrant a threatened or near-threatened category. It is found within multiple protected areas and does not currently require any additional conservation measures.

== See also ==
- List of Grevillea species
