= Richard Hardey =

Australian politician (1844–1910)

The Honourable Richard Hardey

Member of the Legislative Council of Western Australia
- In office 25 July 1876 – 5 July 1880
- Preceded by: William Burges
- Succeeded by: George Randell
- Constituency: None (nominated by governor)
- In office 31 December 1890 – 4 June 1894
- Preceded by: None (new creation)
- Succeeded by: None (abolished)
- Constituency: None (nominated by governor)
- In office 16 July 1894 – 27 July 1896
- Preceded by: None (new district)
- Succeeded by: John Taylor
- Constituency: East Province

Personal details
- Born: 9 February 1844 Perth, Western Australia, Australia
- Died: 12 February 1910 (aged 66) Maylands, Western Australia, Australia

Richard Watson Hardey (9 February 1844 – 12 February 1910) was an Australian pastoralist and politician who was a member of the Legislative Council of Western Australia on three occasions – from 1876 to 1880, from 1890 to 1894, and then from 1894 to 1896.

== Early life and family ==
Hardey was the son of Ann (née Robinson) and Joseph Hardey, who had arrived in the Swan River Colony in February 1830. His parents, originally from Lincolnshire, England, were devout Methodists, with his father being the leader of the first Methodist congregation in Perth (as a lay preacher rather than an ordained minister). Hardey was sent to England to be educated, only returning to Australia in 1866. He took over his father's property, Peninsula Farm, and also purchased an estate near York (an inland town).

Hardey had married twice, to Jane Lowe in 1876 and to Kathleen Beurteaux in 1892. He had one child by his first wife and two children by his second.

== Political career and later life ==
In 1876, Hardey was nominated to the Legislative Council by the governor, Sir William Robinson. He contested a by-election for the seat of York in February 1880, but was defeated by Edward Hamersley, and resigned from parliament in July of the same year.

With the advent of responsible government in 1890, the Legislative Council was made fully appointive. Hardey was nominated to the council for a second time, again by Sir William Robinson. He held his seat until 1894, when a constitutional amendment made the council fully elective for the first time. At the 1894 elections, Hardey polled the third-highest number of votes in East Province (behind Charles Dempster and Richard Goldsmith Burges), and was consequently elected to a two-year term. He was defeated by John Taylor in 1896. Outside of parliament, Hardey had been elected to the Perth Road Board in 1877, and was appointed chairman in 1890. He served in the position until his death at the Peninsula Farm in February 1910, aged 66.
