= Edmund Brockman =

Edmund Brockman may refer to:

- Edmund Ralph Brockman (1828–1908), Australian politician
- Edmund Vernon Brockman (1882–1938), Australian politician

== See also ==
- Edmund Drake-Brockman (1884–1949), Australian Army general
