= E. T. Hooley =

Western Australian politician and explorer

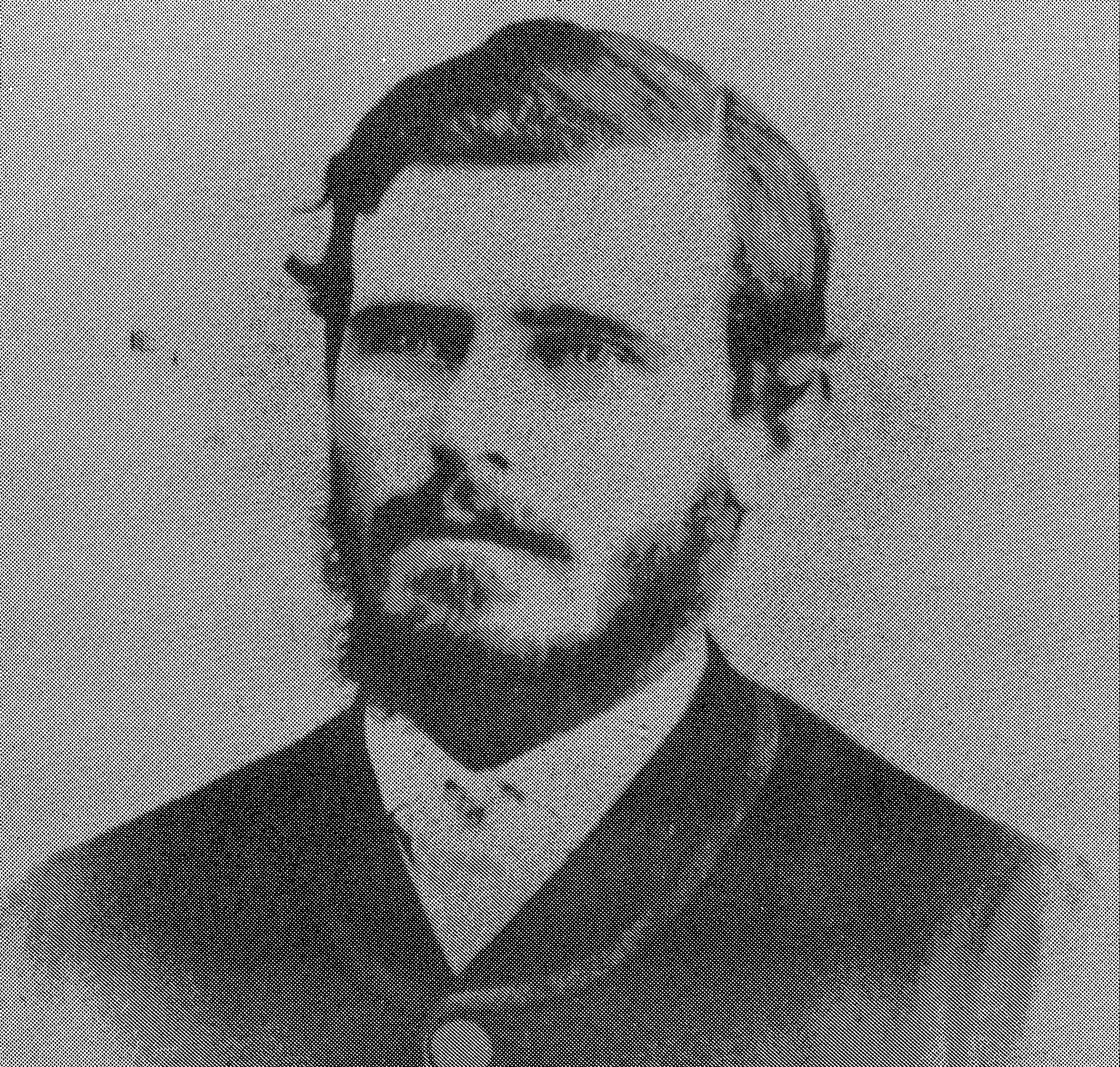
E. T. Hooley in 1866, the year he opened the overland stock route from Geraldton to Roebourne.

Edward Timothy Hooley (1842 – 3 August 1903), usually known as E. T. Hooley or Tim Hooley, was an explorer in Western Australia, who in 1866 pioneered an overland stock route from Geraldton to the Ashburton River. He entered politics in later life, serving nearly three years as a Member of the Western Australian Legislative Council, then nearly six years in the Western Australian Legislative Assembly.

== Early life ==
Hooley was born at sea in 1842, on board Bolivar, which was en route from London to Launceston, Van Diemen's Land. According to his birth certificate he was born on 30 September, but this was not registered until 19 November, and most other historical records list his date of birth as 3 October. His birth certificate also lists his name as Timothy Bolivar Hooley, but if Hooley ever used the name he had dropped it in favour of Edward Timothy Hooley by 1866. His father, Daniel Hooley, was a farmer who had emigrated to Van Diemen's Land to take up an offer of work at a sheep and cattle station there. His mother was Ellen née Barry.

The Hooley family remained in Launceston until January 1846, when they moved to Portland, Colony of New South Wales. Edward Hooley was educated there, becoming a farmer and sheep and cattle dealer, before marrying an Irish immigrant named Jane Maze on 23 November or 4 December 1861. They subsequently had two sons and five daughters.

== Exploring in Western Australia ==
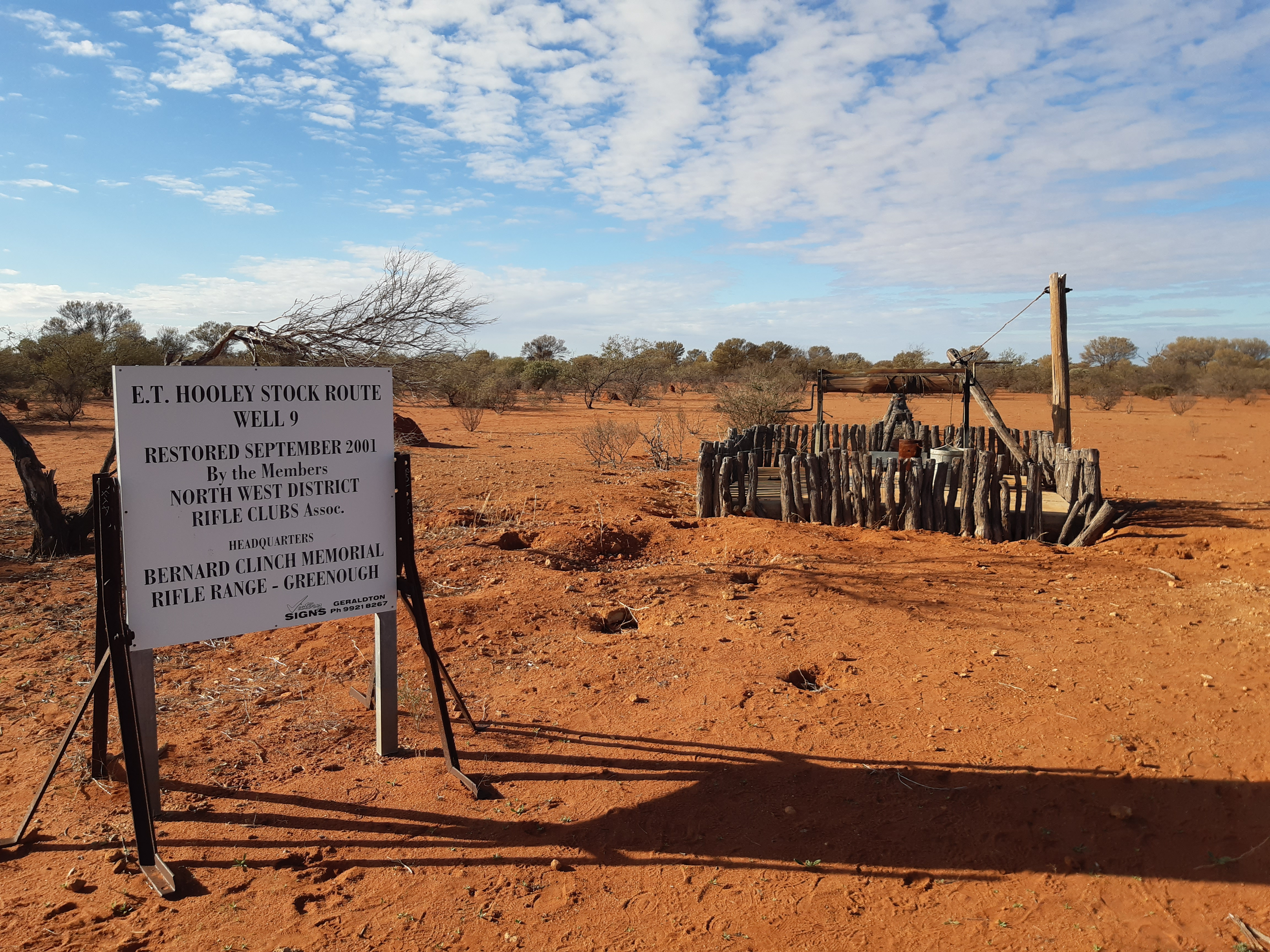
The restored E. T. Hooley Stock Route Well No. 9

In July 1864, Hooley joined with a number of other Victorian pastoralists in forming the Camden Harbour Pastoral Company, which aimed to form a settlement and claim extensive pastoral land at Camden Sound Western Australia. Arriving on board Stag in December, Hooley and the other pioneers found the land to be virtually useless for agricultural and pastoral purposes. Hooley and some other members of the company explored the area around the Prince Regent River but found the land was no better.

By April the following year, the company had dissolved, and Hooley and others sailed south to the Tientsin Bay settlement (later known as Cossack). From there the men made a number of exploring expeditions. First they explored the Harding and Sherlock Rivers, but found no land worth claiming. They then made a second expedition, south through the Hamersley Range as far as the Ashburton River, where they found good pastoral land. Hooley travelled to Perth to apply for a pastoral lease over the land, and was eventually granted a lease over 100,000 acres (40,000 ha).

Unable to afford the cost of sea freight for his stock, Hooley undertook to find an overland stock route to his lease. He first tried to find a route along the coast, but gave up the attempt after months of hardship. He then attempted an inland route. Leaving Geraldton with four teamsters, two native guides and nearly 2000 sheep on 26 May 1865, he travelled up the Murchison River, then north through the watersheds of the Murchison, Gascoyne, Ashburton and Fortescue Rivers, arriving at the Fortescue after a journey of around three months. He had found good stock feed throughout the journey, but felt that it would be a difficult route in drought. During this expedition Hooley named both the Henry and Frederick Rivers.

By opening up an overland stock route connecting Perth and Roebourne, Hooley had found a cheap and safe way to transport stock to the northern stations, thus securing their future as a pastoral area. Within a year of his discovery of the route, 5.8 million acres (23,000 km^{2}) of pastoral land had been leased in the north west. When Hooley returned to Perth to announce his discovery, he was widely acclaimed; some settlers even presented him with an engraved gold watch (which is now held by the Western Australian Museum).

== Pastoralist and merchant ==
In 1867, Hooley bought land in Roebourne and was awarded the first pastoral lease on the Ashburton River, at Minderoo. The following year he briefly returned to Victoria, to accompany his wife and children to Western Australia. Hooley retained the lease for only two years, abandoning it in the face of great hostility from the Aboriginal people of the area, following a conflict known as the Battle of Minderoo. They initially moved to Hooley's lease on the Fortescue River, but a year later Hooley was declared bankrupt and the family moved to Perth.

The family settled at Guildford, and Hooley accepted work as overseer for Thomas Gull at Boraning. He later joined his family at Guildford, managing the Barker and Gull store and being elected to the Guildford Municipal Council in 1878. On 13 February 1880 he was elected to the Western Australian Legislative Council for the seat of Swan, but resigned after only two months.

In 1881, Hooley returned to the north west of Western Australia, taking up a lease at Mount Mortimer. In 1884 he took up a cattle station on the Henry River. Within a few years he returned to Perth, becoming manager for John Henry Monger's store. This was sold to Dalgety in 1888, and Hooley continued as Dalgety and Co.'s first manager.

Hooley wrote extensively during his time in Perth. He wrote many newspaper articles under the name "Bucolic", and he also wrote a novel entitled Tarragal, or, Bushlife in Australia. He became involved in several business ventures, becoming a director of Equitable Life Insurance, the Swan Brewery, and the Lady Shenton Gold Mining Company. He was a member of the Menzies syndicate, and was for some time the president of the Western Australian Turf Club.

== In politics ==
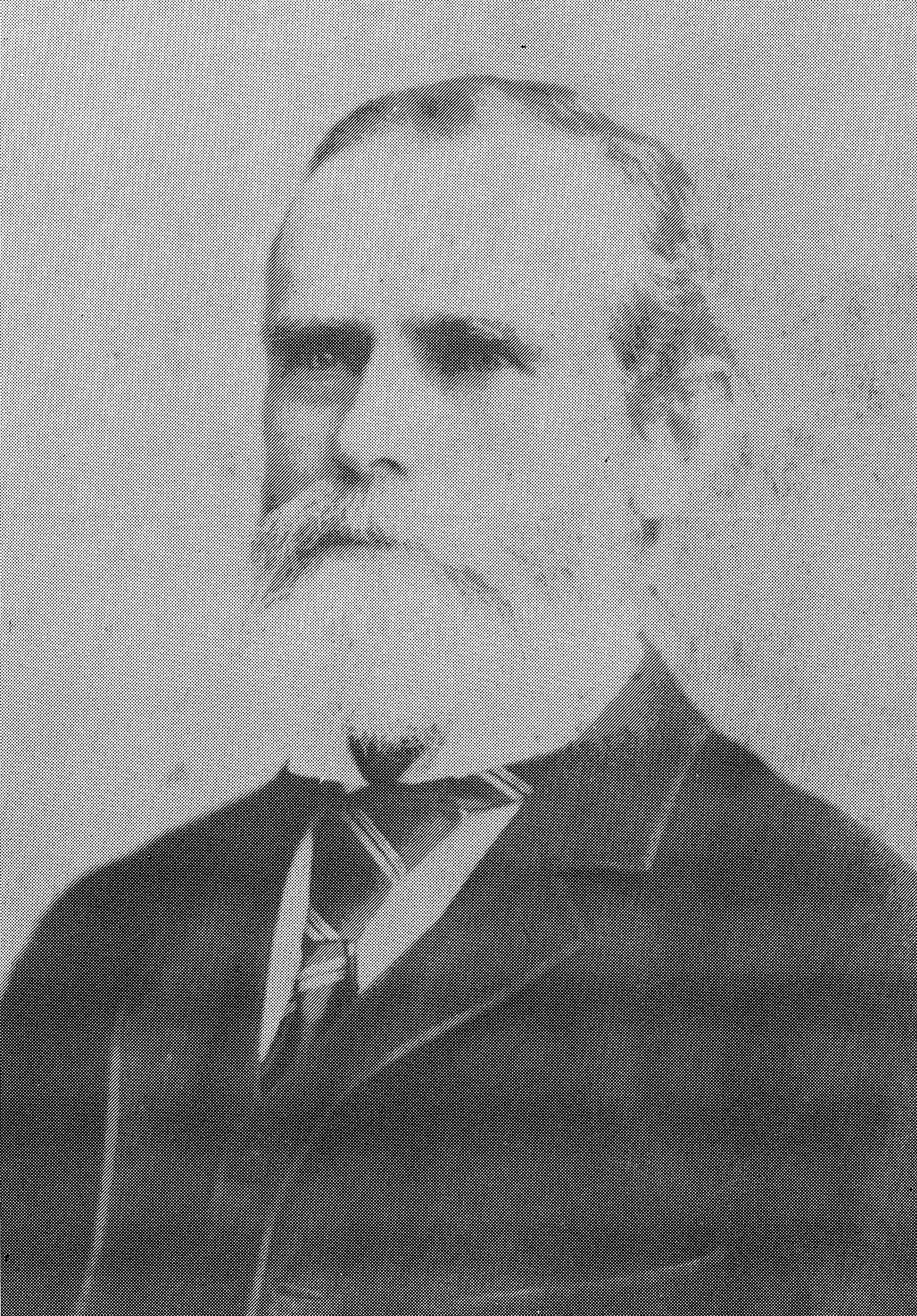
E. T. Hooley in 1890

Hooley became a justice of the peace in 1890, and the following year was appointed to the first Native Protection Board. He was a nominated Member of the Legislative Council from 12 December 1891 to June 1894, when it became elective. He then contested the Central Province seat in the election of 16 July 1894, but was unsuccessful. Three months later he won the Western Australian Legislative Assembly seat of Murchison in a by-election occasioned by the resignation of Everard Darlot. He held the seat until the election of 26 April 1897, in which he instead contested and won the seat of De Grey. He resigned on 28 May 1900 due to illness.

== Later life ==
In 1900, Hooley travelled to England for medical advice on a condition then described as "creeping paralysis". With no help available, he spent the next three years travelling throughout Europe, dying in Vevey, Switzerland on 3 August 1903.
