= Hamersley River =

River in Western Australia

Coordinates: 33°56′53″S 119°55′12″E

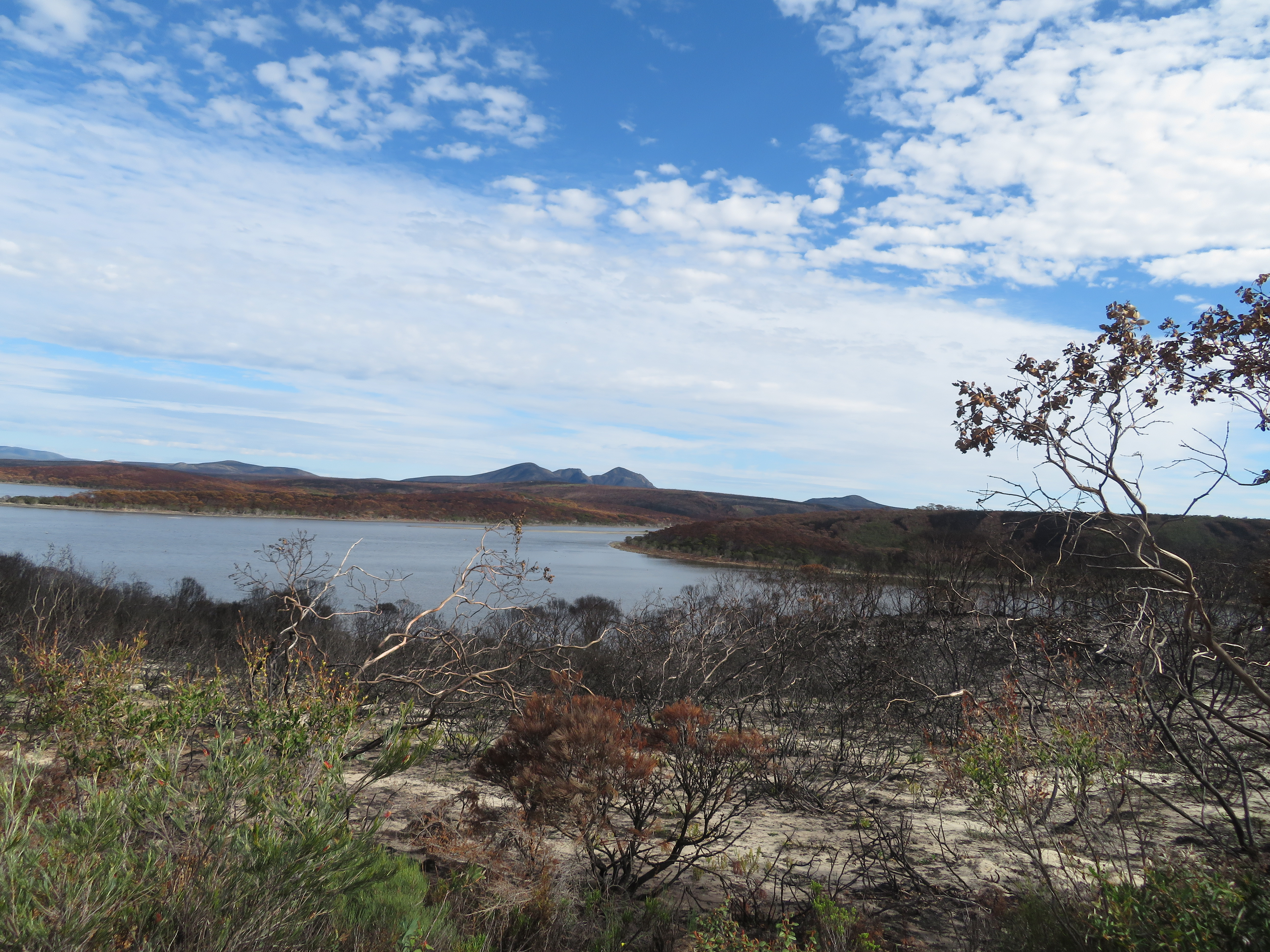
- The mouth of the Hamersley River, near Hamersley Inlet

Location
- Country: Australia

Physical characteristics
- Source
  - elevation: 252 metres (827 ft)
- Mouth
  - location: Hamersley Inlet
  - elevation: sea level
- Length: 40 km (25 mi)

The Hamersley River is an ephemeral river in the Great Southern region of Western Australia.

The headwaters of the river rise east of Fitzgerald and just north of the South Coast Highway on an undulating sandplain on the edge of the Yilgarn plateau and flows in a south easterly direction. The river flows through the Fitzgerald River National Park winding through gorges cut into faults in the quartzite and schist of the Mount Barren formation until discharging into the Hamersley Inlet and on to the Southern Ocean.

Hamersley Inlet is a wave dominated estuary approximately 7 kilometres (4 mi) in length with a depth of about 2 metres (7 ft) with a total surface area of 2.9 square kilometres (1 sq mi).

The river was named by the explorer and surveyor John Forrest in 1871 while on expedition in the area. He is thought to have named it after his future wife, Margaret Hamersley or her family.

The river is an important drainage network in the National Park. The river flows very little under normal conditions but floods infrequently after heavy rain events.

The upper part of the catchment has been mostly cleared for agriculture but the lower part in the National park is in near pristine condition. Overall 20% of the river's catchment has been cleared.
