= Richard Gale (Australian politician) =

Australian farmer and politician

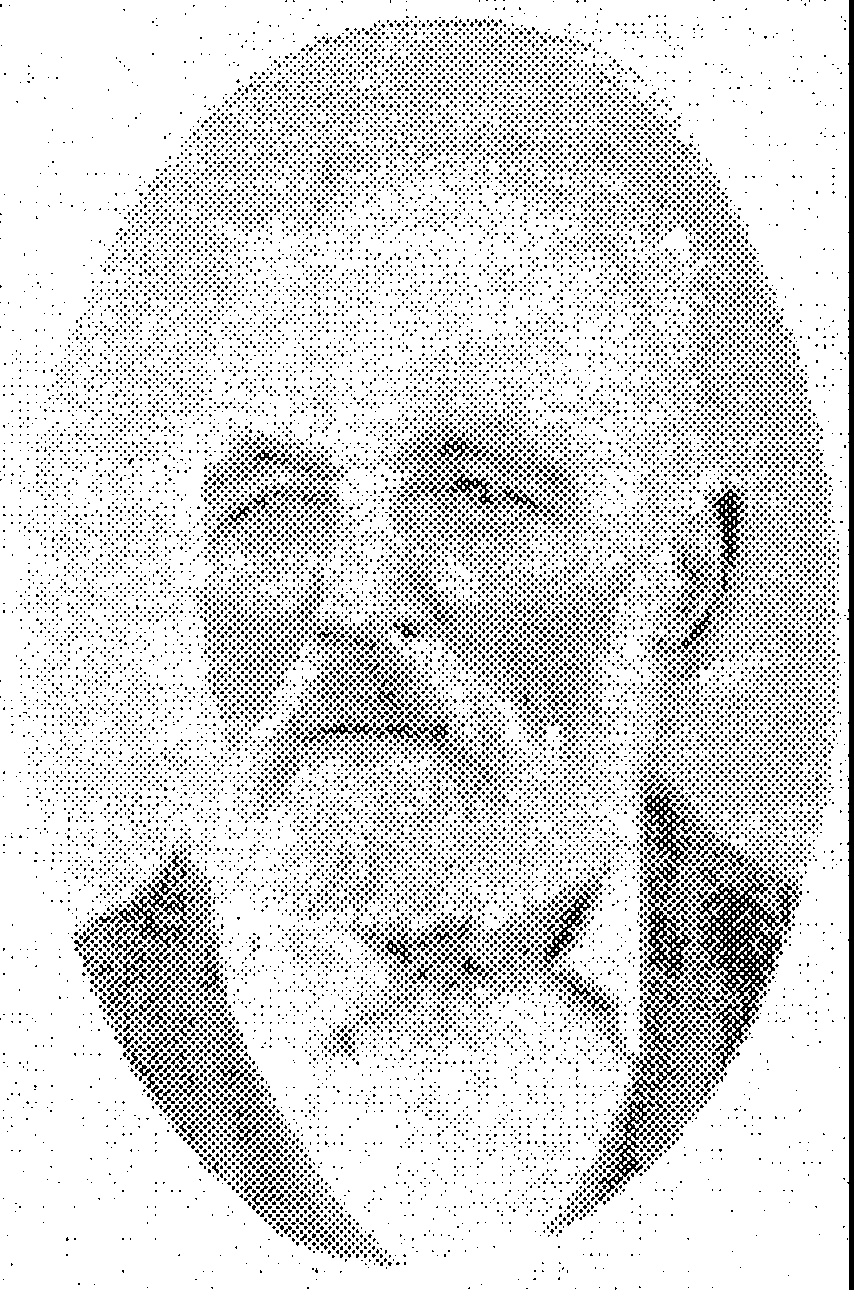
Richard Gale

Richard Gale (1834–2 January 1931), was a Member of the Western Australian Legislative Council from 1874 to 1878.

He was born the 12th child of John Gale, farmer of Dorset, England (the third by his second wife, Mary Brown). He was baptised at Beaminster on 18 December 1834, and in later life said he was born at Westhay Farm. Nothing more is known of his early life, but in 1856, he emigrated to Western Australia on board the Shanghai. He was farm and dairy manager for William Locke Brockman at Gingin until 1860, and then managed John Molloy's Busselton property Fairlawn until 1867. On Molloy's death in October of that year, Gale leased and then purchased Fairlawn, living there until his death.

Gale became a pioneer of dairy farming in the South West, and also became involved in public affairs. He was a foundation member and president of the Southern Districts Agricultural Society, and a member of the Vasse Road Board. On 5 October 1874 he was elected to the Legislative Council seat of Vasse, holding it until his resignation on 16 February 1878.

On 5 September 1877, Gale married Hannah Rebecca Margaret Spencer, daughter of William Spencer. The marriage made him a brother-in-law of James Mitchell, who had also married one of Spencer's daughters. Gale had no children, and died at Busselton on 2 January 1931.
