= Wallace Bickley =

Australian politician

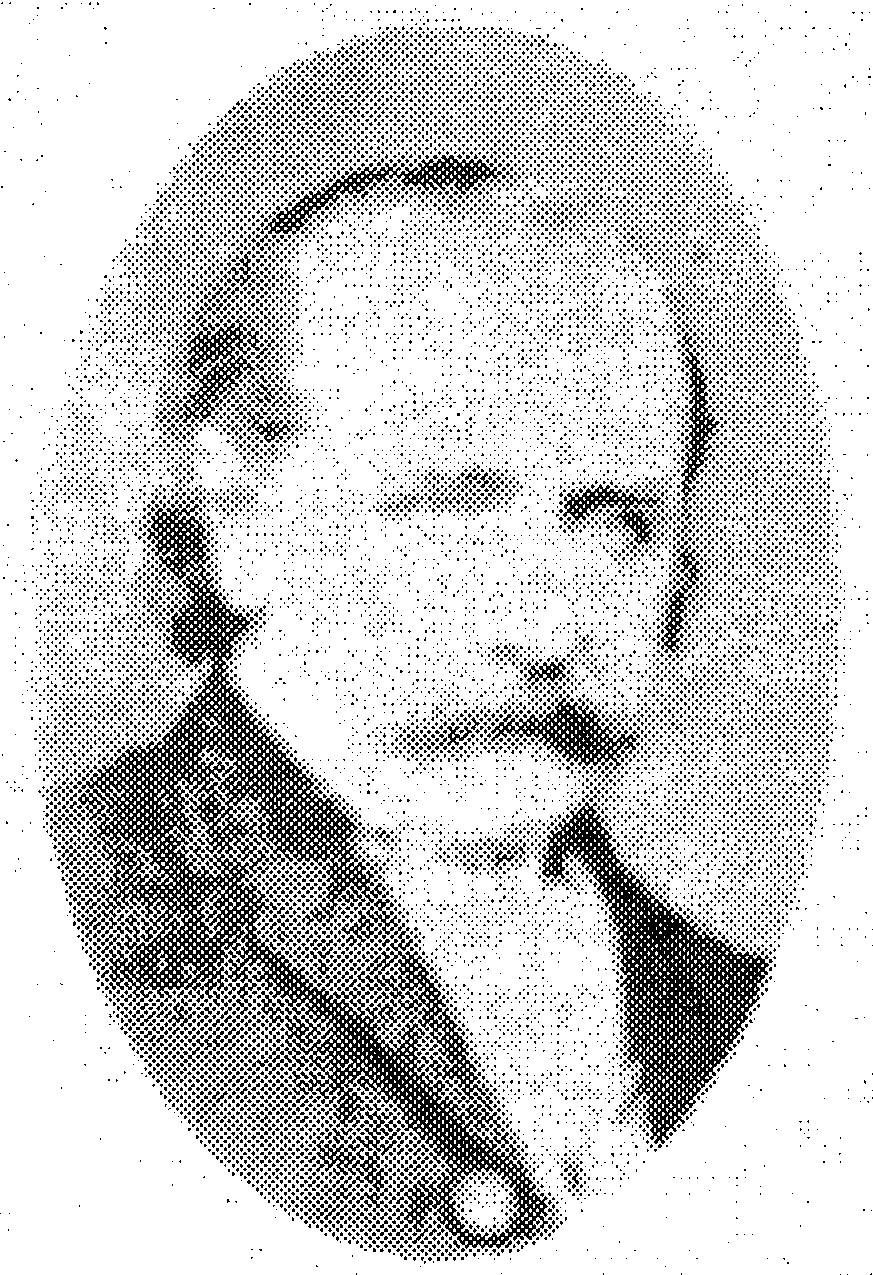
Wallace Bickley

Wallace Alexander Bickley (11 October 1810 – 30 June 1876) was an early settler in the Swan River Colony of Western Australia, who became a Member of the Western Australian Legislative Council.

Born in Kent, England on 11 October 1810, he was christened Samuel Wallace Alexander Bickley but his first name was dropped to distinguish him from his father Samuel. He was educated at Dr Butters' College in Shropshire, and spent some time in Germany, before emigrating to Western Australia on board the Protector in February 1830. He set up a trading business and in April 1833 he married Marianne Thomson. In 1837 he emigrated to India to work for the British East India Company, developing the trade in horses between Western Australia and India. His wife died in June 1841, and the following February he married Elizabeth Burke née Tynan.

In 1851, Bickley returned to Western Australia. He became the owner of Kenwick Park in the Canning district. Over time he became one of the leading merchants in Fremantle, becoming an agent for Lloyd's of London and a representative of the Melbourne Shipowners' Association. In the 1860s he invested in mining in the Geraldton district. Bickley donated the Canning community a 1.5-hectare (3 3/4-acre) parcel of land on Bickley brook near Albany Highway for the building of a school, police station, church and cemetery. In 1867 he became a Justice of the Peace. He was a regular contributor to the Fremantle Herald, and became Chairman of the Marine Survey Board. On 29 July 1872, Bickley was nominated to the Western Australian Legislative Council, remaining in the seat until his death at Fremantle on 30 June 1876.

The Perth suburb of Bickley is named after him.
