= James Morrison (Western Australia) =

Australian businessman and politician

Member of the Legislative Council of Western Australia
- In office 13 December 1887 – 21 October 1890
- Preceded by: William Loton
- Succeeded by: None (council reconstituted)
- Constituency: None (nominated by governor)
- In office 24 December 1890 – 4 June 1894
- Preceded by: None (new creation)
- Succeeded by: None (council reconstituted)
- Constituency: None (nominated by governor)

Personal details
- Born: 25 June 1846 Islington, London, England
- Died: 24 December 1927 (aged 81) North Perth, Western Australia, Australia

James Morrison (25 June 1846 – 24 December 1927) was an Australian businessman and politician in Western Australia. He owned land in Perth and the Wheatbelt, and served as a director of various companies. Morrison was a nominated member of Legislative Council from 1887 to 1894, and subsequently made two unsuccessful runs for parliament.

== Early life and business career ==
Morrison was born in Islington, London, England, to Christina (née McLaren) and Joseph Robert Morrison. His father came from a mercantile family which had business connections in Australia and New Zealand. Morrison moved to New Zealand in 1863, and then to Melbourne, where he managed a family business for a few years before going on to Western Australia in 1868. In Perth, Morrison set up as a stock and station agent. He served as a director of various insurance and finance companies, and acquired land in Guildford and York. He also had a property on the Perth–Fremantle Road which he named the Claremont Estate (after his wife, Clara). The name was later extended to the surrounding suburb.

== Politics ==
In 1887, Morrison was nominated to the Legislative Council by the governor, Sir Frederick Broome. The council was dissolved in October 1890 and reconstituted in December 1890 as the upper house of the new bicameral Parliament of Western Australia. Morrison was renominated, and served until it was again dissolved in June 1894, becoming a fully elective body. He contested the 1894 elections, standing in East Province, but only finished fifth out of six candidates. Morrison ran for the Legislative Assembly at the 1897 election, but was defeated by William Loton in the seat of Swan.

== Later life ==
Morrison concentrated on his commercial interests after leaving the Legislative Council. He retired only in 1925, due to declining health, and died in Perth in December 1927, aged 81. He was buried at Karrakatta Cemetery, with his funeral being attended by a number of local identities. Morrison had married Clara Charlotte de Burgh in 1870, with whom he had six children. He was widowed in 1920. Two of his brothers-in-law were also members of parliament, Henry Brockman and Charles Harper.

== See also ==
- Morrison Road
