= Edmund Birch =

Australian politician

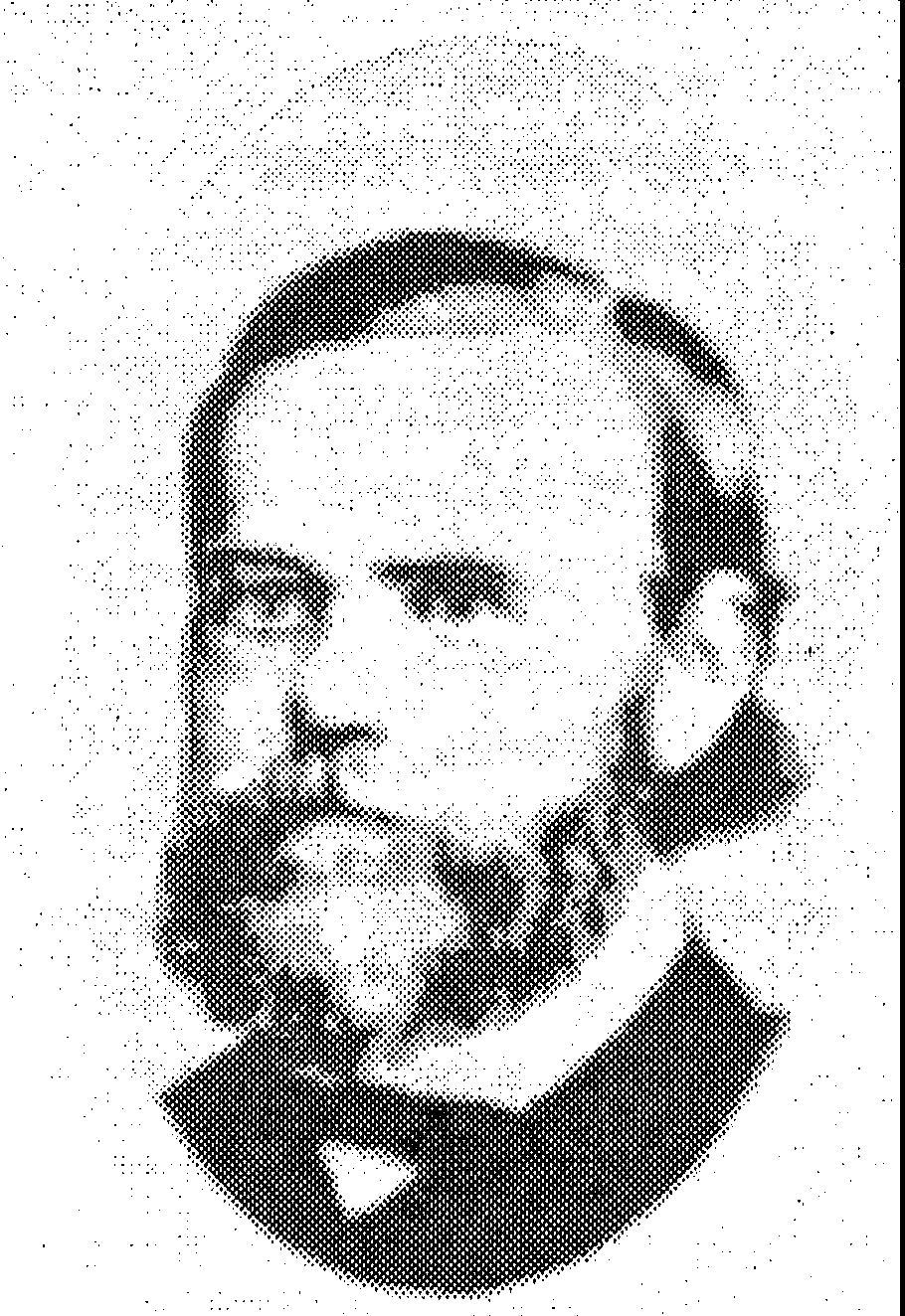
Edmund Birch

Edmund Birch (1831 – 16 January 1875) was a Member of the Western Australian Legislative Council from 1873 to 1875.

Born in England in 1831, Birch emigrated to Western Australia on the Parkfield in March 1841. There he was apprenticed to George Shenton Sr as a pharmacist. From 1852 to 1853, he was an assistant at the Colonial Hospital (now Royal Perth Hospital). He then went into partnership with his father and brother as pharmacists and grocers in Perth. In May 1856 he married Anne Hymus; they would have eight children.

Birch began to take an interest in public life, becoming vice president of the Perth Workingmen's Association and chairman of the Swan Mechanics' Institute. In 1862 he was a founding director of the Perth Building Society. The following year he became a member of the Perth Municipal Council, which position he held until his death. He became a member of the Perth Board of Education, a director of the WA Bank, and in 1872 was captain of the Volunteer Rifle Corps.

On 19 October 1870, Birch contested the Legislative Council's seat of Perth, but was unsuccessful. On 18 November 1873, he contested the seat again in a by-election. He won the seat, holding it until his death. He died on 16 January 1875 as a result of injuries from a fire.
