= Samuel Hamersley =

Western Australian politician

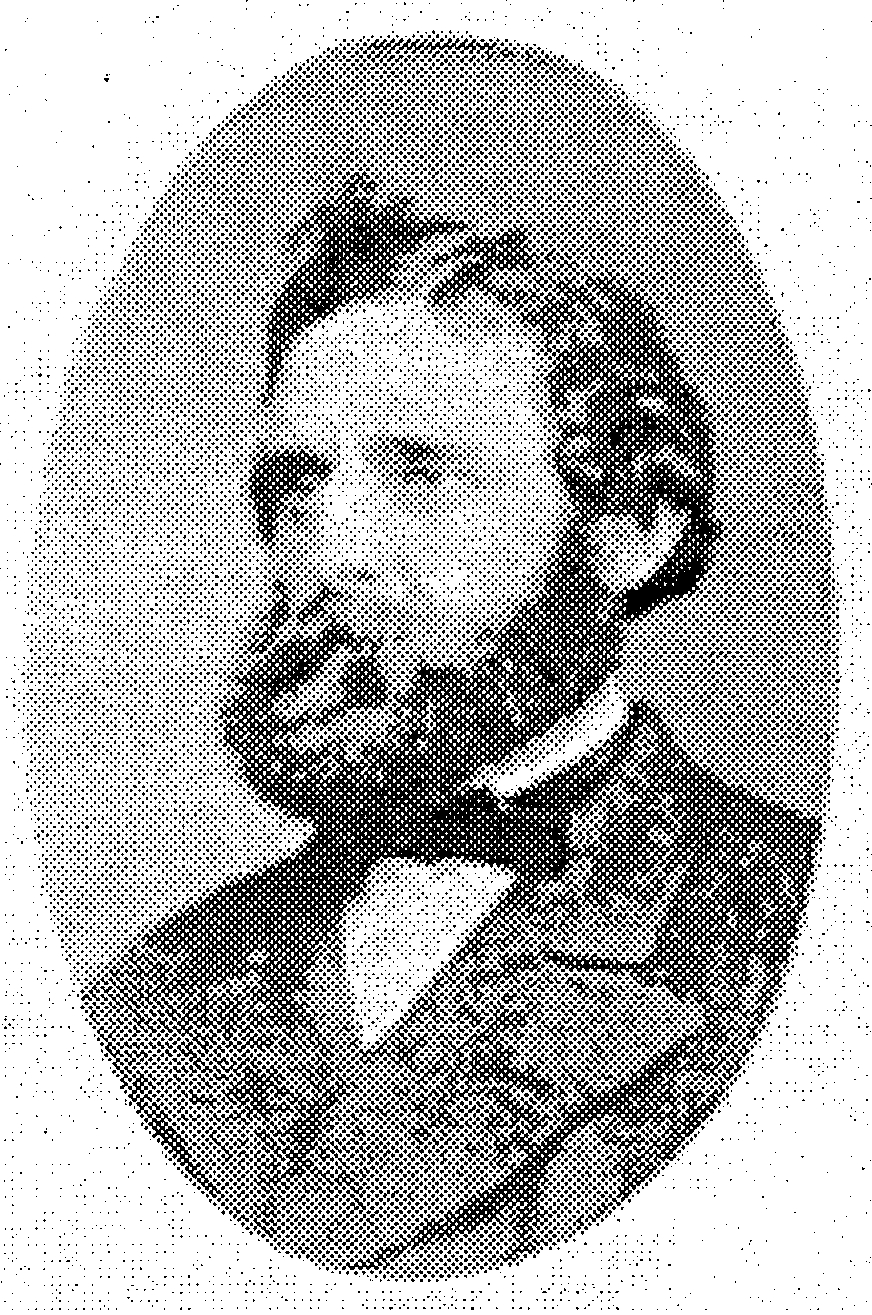
- Born: 12 October 1842; Guildford, Western Australia
- Died: 1 October 1896 (aged 53); Guildford, Western Australia
- Occupations: Farmer; Politician
- Spouse: Matilda Brown
- Parent: Edward Hamersley (Snr)
- Relatives: Edward Hamersley (Jnr) (brother); Margaret Forrest (sister); William Locke Brockman (uncle); Thomas Brown (father-in-law); Maitland Brown (brother-in-law); Kenneth Brown (brother-in-law)

Samuel Richard Hamersley (1842–1896) was a Western Australian pastoralist, and a Member of the Western Australian Legislative Council for six years.

== Biography ==
=== Early life ===
Samuel Hamersley was born in Guildford, Western Australia on 12 October 1842. The Hamersleys were a well connected family, and he was related by blood or marriage to a number of prominent Western Australian farmers and politicians. His father, Edward, was one of the leading Western Australian landholders of his day; his brother Edward also became a Member of the Legislative Council; William Locke Brockman was his uncle; his sister Margaret married Sir John Forrest; and his wife Matilda was sister to Maitland Brown.

At the age of one, he went with his family to France. The family returned to Western Australia in 1850, building a home in Guildford. In his youth, he farmed in Toodyay, York and Swan Districts under a system of tenant farming.

=== Career ===
In 1863, he was a member of an exploring expedition to the Glenelg River.

From about 1865 until 1868, he managed the family's Richmond property at Williams; he then spend some time at Wungong in the Canning district, before returning to Guildford in 1870. In 1873, he was running a butchering business, and in 1875 he inherited his father's Haseley property in Toodyay.

Western Australia having obtained representative government in 1870, he stood for election in 1874, and on 2 October, he was elected to the Legislative Council seat of Murray and Williams. He held the seat until 12 February 1880, when he was succeeded by Septimus Burt. In February 1889, he contested the seat of Toodyay but was defeated by the incumbent George Shenton. The following May, he won the seat of Swan in a by-election, but was only required to hold it for five months before the Legislative Council was reformed with the advent of responsible government.

=== Personal life and death ===
In 1865, he married Matilda Brown, daughter of Thomas Brown and sister to Maitland and Kenneth. They had three sons and three daughters; one of his sons was Vernon Hamersley, who became the longest-serving Member of the Legislative Council ever.

He died on 1 October 1896 in Guildford, Western Australia.
