= Thomas Gull =

Australian politician

The Honourable Thomas Gull

Member of the Legislative Council of Western Australia
- In office 26 October 1870 – 28 June 1872
- Preceded by: None (new creation)
- Succeeded by: William Locke Brockman
- Constituency: Swan

Personal details
- Born: 1832 London, England
- Died: 5 January 1878 (aged 46) Guildford, Western Australia, Australia

Thomas Courthope Gull (1832 – 5 January 1878) was an early settler of Western Australia who served as a member of the colony's Legislative Council from 1870 to 1872.

Born in London, England, Gull came to Western Australia in 1852. He settled in Guildford (on the outskirts of Perth), and went into partnership with his uncle, Samuel Adams Barker. Their merchant firm, Barker and Gull, is said to have survived until 1891, after both their deaths. The partnership, however, was dissolved 'by mutual consent' on 6 September, 1870. Outside of that business, Gull also owned a property of 10,000 acres (40 km^{2}) at Bannister (near Williams). This property and a neighbouring property co-leased with Barker were used to rear horses. Gull first ran for parliament in 1867, in the unofficial elections held to guide the governor in his nomination process. He was unsuccessful then, but in the first official elections, in 1870, contested and won the seat of Swan.

While in office, Gull was a keen advocate for the construction of what would become known as the Eastern Railway, linking Guildford with Northam. However, he was defeated at the 1872 elections by William Locke Brockman, and subsequently concentrated on his commercial interests. Gull died in Guildford in January 1878, aged only 46, from "congestion of the lungs". He had married Annie Dempster in 1861, with whom he had two daughters (only the second surviving infancy) and four sons: Ethel Marion (b.1863), Hubert (1865), Arthur (1867), Wilfred (1869), and Harold (1871). By the 1890s, the three younger sons had a company with agricultural interests in the Williams River area, registered as the Gull Brothers. Two of Thomas's brothers-in-law, Andrew and Charles Edward Dempster, and a son, Arthur Courthope Gull, were also members of parliament.
