= Charles Harper (politician) =

Western Australian politician, pastoralist and newspaper owner

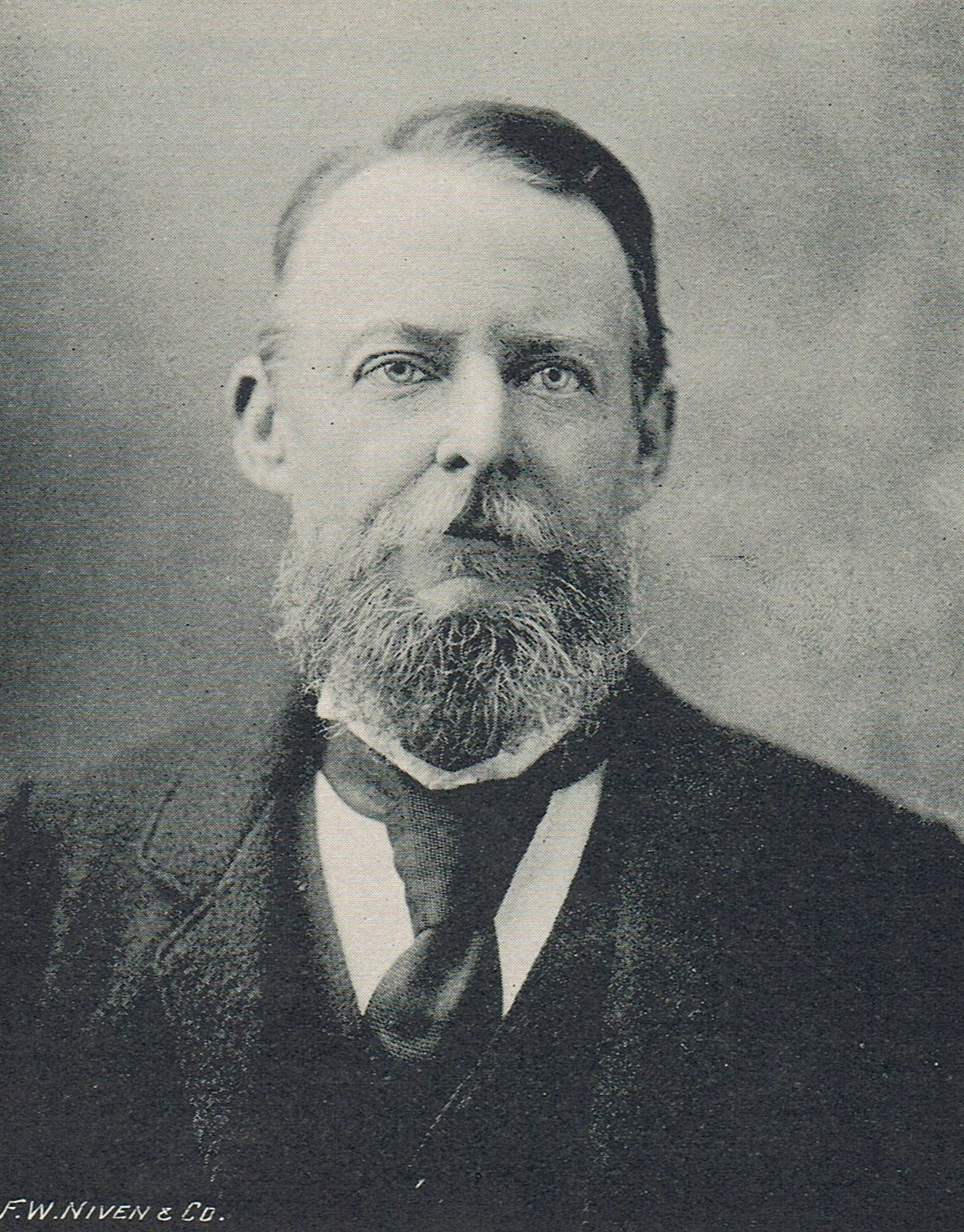

2nd Speaker of the Western Australian Legislative Assembly
- In office 2 December 1903 – 27 July 1904
- Preceded by: James George Lee Steere
- Succeeded by: Mathieson Jacoby

Member of the Legislative Assembly of Western Australia for Beverley
- In office 4 December 1890 – 27 October 1905
- Preceded by: Electoral district created
- Succeeded by: Edmund Smith

Member of the Legislative Council of Western Australia for York
- In office 27 October 1884 – 21 October 1890
- Preceded by: Edward Hamersley
- Succeeded by: Electoral district abolished

Member of the Legislative Council of Western Australia for the North
- In office 28 March 1878 – 12 March 1880
- Preceded by: Thomas Burges
- Succeeded by: McKenzie Grant

Personal details
- Born: 15 July 1842 Nardi, Toodyay, Western Australia, Australia
- Died: 20 April 1912 (aged 69) Woodbridge House, Guildford, Western Australia, Australia
- Resting place: Karrakatta Cemetery
- Spouse: Fanny de Burgh
- Children: 6 sons 4 daughters
- Parent(s): Charles Harper; Julia Gretchem (Lukin) Harper
- Relatives: Henry Brockman (brother-in-law); James Morrison (brother-in-law)
- Education: Pembroke College, Cambridge
- Occupation: Farmer; Newspaper owner Politician

Charles Harper (15 July 1842 – 20 April 1912) was a pastoralist, newspaper proprietor and politician in colonial Western Australia.

== Biography ==
=== Early life ===
Charles Harper was born on 15 July 1842 at Nardi, near Toodyay in Western Australia. His father was Reverend Charles Harper, a Church of England minister, and his mother, Julia Gretchem Harper née Lukin. He was educated privately.

=== Pastoral career ===
He took up farming in Beverley, Western Australia. In 1861 and again in 1864, he explored with other pioneers in the Yilgarn district.

From 1866, he was heavily involved in the pastoral industry. He was a pastoralist in the north-west of the state until 1868, overlanding to Geraldton in 1867 to secure provisions for Roebourne. From 1868 to 1870, he was involved in the pearling industry. He then briefly farmed at Beverley, before returning to the north west in 1871. He went into partnership with McKenzie Grant and Edgar in a de Grey sheep station, and was involved in the pearling industry until 1879.

=== Political career ===
On 28 March 1878, he was elected to the Western Australian Legislative Council for the North District, in a by-election occasioned by the resignation of Thomas Burges. He held the seat until the election of 12 March 1880, which he did not contest. On 1 March 1879, he married Fanny de Burgh, thereby becoming brother-in-law to Henry Brockman and James Morrison. They had six sons and four daughters.

In 1880, he partnered with Alexander McRae in a pastoral venture on the Ashburton. That year, he also became a newspaper proprietor for the first time, becoming part owner of The Western Australian Times with John Winthrop Hackett. On 18 November 1879, the newspaper was renamed The West Australian. On 19 December 1885, they launched publication of the Western Mail.

On 27 October 1884, he entered parliament for the second time, having won the seat of York. In 1885, he built a home in Guildford, which he named Woodbridge House; the house still stands and is now part of the National Trust. In 1887, he was a member of the Agricultural Commission.

He held his Legislative Council seat until 21 October 1890, at which time the Legislative Council became fully nominative. He then contested and won the seat of Beverley in the Legislative Assembly. From June 1894, he was Father of the House in the Legislative Assembly. In 1895 he opened a school at Guildford, which would later be taken over by the Church of England as Guildford Grammar School. He was appointed Chairman of Committees of the Legislative Assembly on 24 August 1897, holding the appointment until 2 December 1903, when he took up an appointment as Speaker. He stepped down as Speaker on 28 July 1904, and from his seat on 27 October 1905. In 1905, he was chairman of the Immigration Commission.

=== Death ===
He died at Woodbridge on 20 April 1912, and was buried in Karrakatta Cemetery.

== Notes ==
Western Australian Legislative Assembly
Preceded by James George Lee Steere	2nd Speaker of the Western Australian Legislative Assembly; 1903-1904	Succeeded by Mathieson Jacoby
Preceded by Electoral district created	Member for Beverley; 1890–1905	Succeeded by Edmund Smith
Western Australian Legislative Council
Preceded by Edward Hammersley	Member for York; 1884-1890	Succeeded by Electoral district abolished
Preceded by Thomas Burges	Member for the North; 1878-1880	Succeeded by McKenzie Grant
