= Margaret Forrest =

Wife of John Forrest, first Premier of Western Australia

Margaret Elvire Forrest
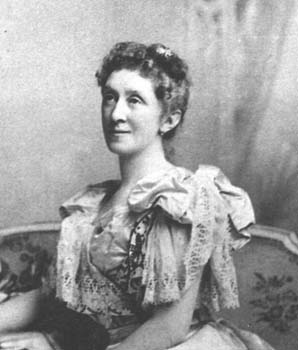
- Born: 22 October 1844; Le Havre, France
- Died: 13 June 1929 (aged 84); Picton, Bunbury
- Known for: Botanical illustration Botanical collecting

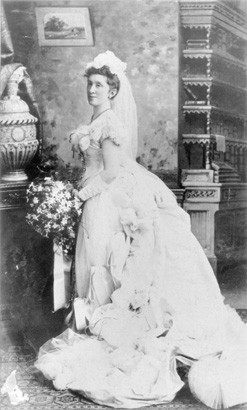
Margaret Forrest wearing a court dress, 1876

Margaret Elvire Forrest, Lady Forrest (née Hamersley; 22 October 1844 – 13 June 1929 in Picton, Bunbury) was the wife of Sir John Forrest.

== Personal life ==
Born in Le Havre, France, she was a member of the prominent and wealthy Hamersley family; her father was Edward Hamersley (Senior), and amongst her brothers were Edward Hamersley (Junior) and Samuel Hamersley. She married Forrest in 1876 and enjoyed many years in public life, as John Forrest became the first Premier of Western Australia, and later a federal politician. Their family residence was The Bungalow at 870 Hay Street, Perth.

== Botanical painting ==
Lady Forrest had a great interest in fine arts. She had an interest in native plants, and was an accomplished painter of wildflowers.

As a prominent member of the colony well known for her interest in natural history and art, Lady Forrest was a contact for visiting botanists and botanical artists. In January 1880 English botanical artist Marianne North visited Western Australia. Throughout her time in Perth, North was supplied with various local botanical specimens by Lady Forrest. During her stay they received word that the rare and spectacular Eucalyptus macrocarpa was flowering at Newcastle (now Toodyay). Lady Forrest and North took the eight hour journey on horseback to see the flowering plant, which was "well worth coming for".

In September 1889 Ellis Rowan joined Margaret Forrest in a painting tour. At Boolantha Station, north of Carnarvon, and Geraldton, they painted desert flowers. Their joint exhibition at the Perth Railway Station Reading Room on 5 November is thought to have been the first art exhibition ever held in the colony.

She was a founding member of the Wilgie Club, the first artists' society in Western Australia, and exhibited six wildflower watercolours in the Wilgie First Annual Exhibition of Paintings in 1890. Forrest was also a founding member of the Karrakatta Club, the first women's club in Australia. After her death in 1929, her collection was bequeathed to the Art Gallery of Western Australia.

== Legacy ==
In Western Australia, Mt Margaret and Mt Elvire, between Laverton and Leonora; and Margaret River and Elvire River in the Kimberley region were named after her, as was the Fremantle Harbour pilot boat Lady Forrest launched in 1903.

== See also ==
- Crowley, Frank (2000). Big John Forrest 1847–1918: A Founding Father of the Commonwealth of Australia. University of Western Australia Press, Nedlands, Western Australia. ISBN 1-876268-44-1.
- Phipps, Jennifer (1986). Artists' Gardens: Flowers and Gardens in Australian Art 1780s-1980s. Sydney, Australia: Bay Books.
- Artwork at the Art Gallery of Western Australia
- List of Australian botanical illustrators
