= Electoral district of Swan (Legislative Council) =

Swan Western Australia—Legislative Council
- State: Western Australia
- Dates current: 1870–1890
- Namesake: Swan River

Swan, officially called The Swan, was an electoral district of the Legislative Council of Western Australia from 1870 to 1890, during the period when the Legislative Council was the sole chamber of the Parliament of Western Australia.

Swan was one of the original ten Legislative Council districts created by the Legislative Council Act 1870 (33 Vict, No. 13). The district's boundaries included large portions of what is now the western Wheatbelt, as well as areas that are now considered part of the Perth metropolitan area. This included the Swan Valley and the Perth Hills, with the district's southernmost point being Mount Dale. The district was bordered by the district of Toodyay to the north and east, the district of York to the east, and the district of Perth to the south. One of the largest settlements in the district was Guildford, which had not yet been integrated into Perth.

Nine men represented Swan in the Legislative Council between 1870 and 1890, the most of any Legislative Council district in that time. Walter Padbury served the longest, from 1872 to 1878, while William Locke Brockman, E. T. Hooley, and Samuel Hamersley each served for less than six months. Hector Rason, the district's eighth representative (from 1889 to 1890), went on to become Premier of Western Australia.

== Members ==
Member	Party	Term
Thomas Gull	None	1870–1872
William Locke Brockman	None	1872
Walter Padbury	None	1872–1878
Edmund Ralph Brockman	None	1878–1880
E. T. Hooley	None	1880
James Lee-Steere	None	1880–1884
Henry Brockman	None	1884–1889
Hector Rason	None	1889–1890
Samuel Hamersley	None	1890
