= Henry Hicks Hocking =

British colonial administrator (1842–1907)

Sir Henry Hicks Hocking

Attorney-General of Western Australia
- In office December 1872 – 25 February 1879
- Preceded by: Robert John Walcott
- Succeeded by: George Walpole Leake

Attorney General of Jamaica
- In office 1881–1896
- Preceded by: Edward Loughlin O'Malley
- Succeeded by: Henry Rawlins Pipon Schooles

Personal details
- Born: 16 July 1842 Kennington, Surrey, England
- Died: 9 June 1907 (aged 64)
- Education: St John's College, Oxford
- Occupation: Colonial administrator

Henry Hicks Hocking (16 July 1842 – 9 June 1907) was a British colonial administrator.

He was born the son of Richard Hocking, a merchant of Kennington, Surrey, and educated at St John's College, Oxford, where he graduated with a BA in 1864 and BCL in 1867. He entered the Inner Temple to study law and was called to the bar in 1867.

After some years in practice in England, Hocking went to Western Australia where he served as Attorney-General of Western Australia from 1872 to 1879, excepting a period in 1874/5 when he was acting Chief Justice in the absence of Archibald Burt. In 1879/80 he was acting Chief Justice of Gibraltar.

He was knighted in 1895.
