= George Glyde =

Australian politician

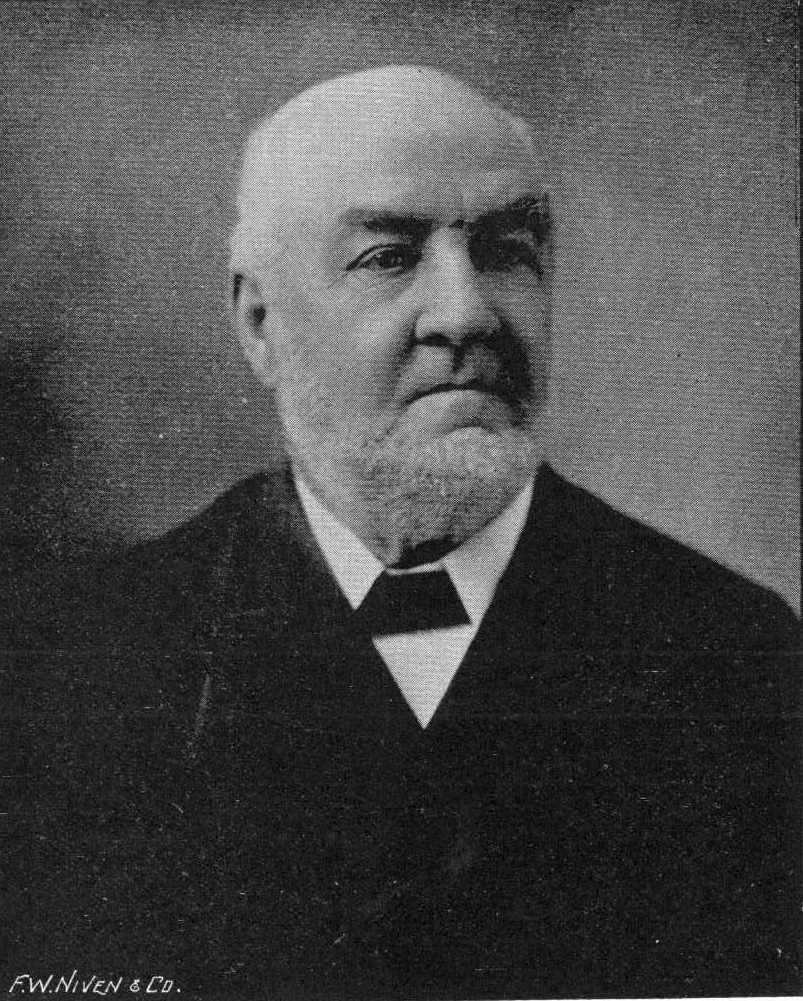

Member of the Legislative Council of Western Australia
- In office 30 June 1874 – October 1879
- Preceded by: None (new seat)
- Succeeded by: Edward Stone
- Constituency: None (nominated by governor)
- In office 2 July 1882 – 11 July 1885
- Preceded by: Edward Stone
- Succeeded by: James Lee-Steere
- Constituency: None (nominated by governor)
- In office 8 March 1892 – 4 June 1894
- Preceded by: John Monger
- Succeeded by: None (council reconstituted)
- Constituency: None (nominated by governor)

Personal details
- Born: 1821 Yeovil, Somerset, England
- Died: 24 January 1898 (aged 76–77) Perth, Western Australia, Australia

George Glyde (1821 – 24 January 1898) was an early settler of Western Australia. He arrived in the colony as a child in 1830, and became a prominent merchant and businessman. Glyde was chairman of the Perth Town Council (the equivalent of mayor) from 1869 to 1873. He later served three terms as a nominated member of Legislative Council, from 1874 to 1879, from 1882 to 1885, and from 1892 to 1894.

== Early life and business career ==
Glyde was born in Yeovil, Somerset, England, to Susannah (née Hallet) and William Glyde. He and his parents arrived in Western Australia in 1830, travelling aboard Rockingham (one of Thomas Peel's ships). They initially lived in Peel's settlement, Clarence, but that failed after a few years and they moved north to Fremantle and then to Perth. In 1841, Glyde began working for Lionel Samson's company in Fremantle. He eventually went into business on his own, running a general store and draper's shop. He also helped to found Perth's first building society, serving as a director from 1862 and as president from 1875.

== Politics and later life ==
In 1867, Glyde was elected to the Perth Town Council. He served as chairman (the equivalent of mayor) from 1869 to 1873, and was in office when the Perth Town Hall was opened in 1870. In June 1874, Glyde was nominated to the Legislative Council by the governor, Frederick Weld. He resigned in October 1879, but was later reappointed for two further terms, serving from July 1882 to July 1885 and again from March 1892 to June 1894. Glyde died at his home on Adelaide Terrace, Perth, in January 1898. He had married Alice Draper in 1843, with whom he had five sons and six daughters.

== See also ==
- List of mayors and lord mayors of Perth
