= Electoral district of York (Legislative Council) =

York Western Australia—Legislative Council
- State: Western Australia
- Dates current: 1870–1890
- Namesake: York, Western Australia

York was an electoral district of the Legislative Council of Western Australia from 1870 to 1890, during the period when the Legislative Council was the sole chamber of the Parliament of Western Australia.

York was one of the original ten Legislative Council districts created by the Legislative Council Act 1870 (33 Vict, No. 13). The district's boundaries took in part of the Darling Scarp to the west and areas of the central, southern, and eastern Wheatbelt, but extended through to the Great Australian Bight and the border with South Australia. It was bordered by the district of Greenough to the north, the district of Toodyay to the north-west, the district of Swan to the west, and the districts of Fremantle (to 1874) and Murray and Williams (after 1874) to the south.

Four men represented York in the Legislative Council between 1870 and 1890, with Charles Harper serving the longest (from 1884 to 1890). Harper went on to be elected to the Legislative Assembly after the advent of responsible government in 1890, while two other members for York, John Monger and Edward Hamersley, were nominated to the reconstituted Legislative Council.

== Members ==
Member	Party	Term
John Monger	None	1870–1873
Joseph Monger	None	1873–1880
Edward Hamersley	None	1880–1884
Charles Harper	None	1884–1890
