= Charles Crowther =

Australian politician

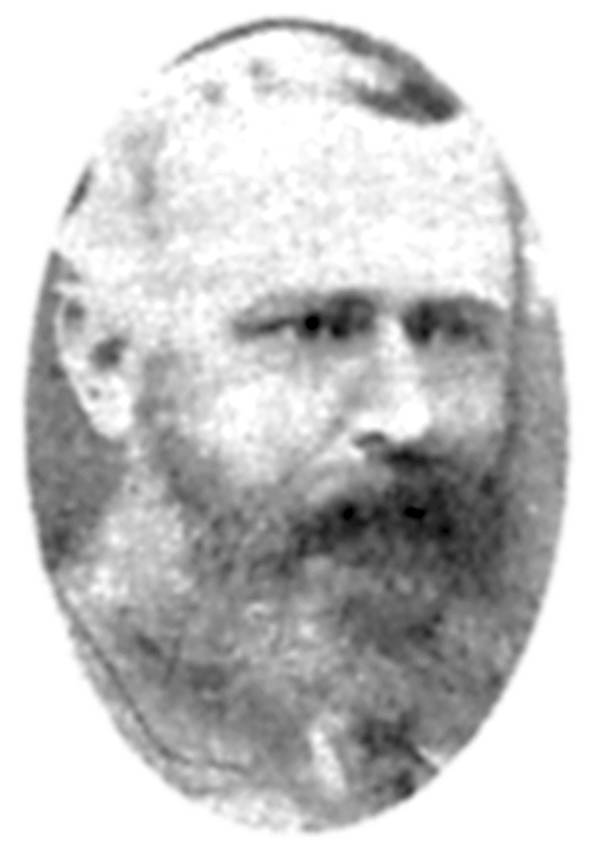
Charles Crowther

Charles Crowther (1831 – 17 March 1894) was a member of the Western Australian Legislative Council from 1873 to 1887.

Born in Lincoln, England, in 1831, nothing is known of his ancestry or early life. In December 1850 he arrived in Western Australia on board the Mary, obtaining employment in the firm of George Shenton Sr. Between 1855 and 1857 he worked for Robert Habgood, before returning to Shenton's employment as manager of his Geraldton business. When Shenton died in 1867, Crowther purchased his business at Geraldton. Later, he purchased and ran the Greenough Hotel.

Crowther became increasingly involved in Geraldton's public and political life from 1871, when he was first elected to the Geraldton Municipal Council. In 1872, he ran the Western Australian Legislative Council seat of Greenough election campaign for his friend George Shenton Jr, who was absent from the colony at the time. On the evening after the election Crowther held a supper and ball for Shenton's supporters. Although "treating the electors" was a common practice at the time, Shenton's opponent Henry Gray lodged a complaint alleging that Crowther had bribed the electorate. In July 1873, the Supreme Court upheld Gray's complaint, finding that Crowther's actions might have induced electors to vote for Shenton. No blame was attached to Shenton, but the election was declared void and a new 1873 Greenough colonial by-election ordered for 29 June 1873. Shenton then declined to stand for election again, so Crowther resigned his seat on the local council and contested the Legislative Council seat himself, heavily defeating Gray.

In 1875, Crowther joined Samuel Mitchell in an unsuccessful lead mine venture. That year he also returned to the Geraldton Municipal Council as its chairman. He resigned from the council in 1876, but served on it again in 1878 and 1879. In 1881 he became the first Mayor of Geraldton. He also acted as resident magistrate and chairman of Quarter Sessions for the district. He resigned as member for Greenough on 29 April 1887. When the Legislative Council became nominative on the advent of responsible government in December 1890, Crowther declined a nomination. He again declined a nomination in August 1893. He died, unmarried, at Geraldton on 17 March 1894.
