= Walter Padbury =

Australian pioneer (1820–1907)

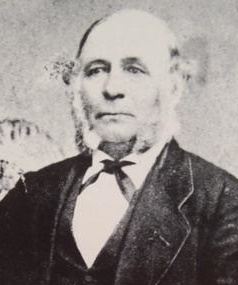
- Walter Padbury, around 1880
- Born: Walter Padbury; 22 December 1817; Fawler, Oxfordshire, England
- Died: 18 April 1907 (aged 89); Perth, Western Australia, Australia
- Occupation(s): squatter, pastoralist, politician, philanthropist
- Spouse: Charlotte Nairn
- Parent(s): Thomas Padbury & Ruth (née Holloway)

Walter Padbury (22 December 1817 – 18 April 1907) was a British-born Australian pioneer, politician and philanthropist.

== Early life ==
Padbury was born in Fawler in the English county of Oxfordshire on 22 December 1817 and baptised on 11 January 1818 at St James Church in nearby Stonesfield. Earlier sources gave his birthdate as 1820, but this has been shown to be incorrect. At the age of 12, Padbury was brought by his father to Fremantle, Western Australia, aboard the Protector on 25 February 1830, before his father's death in July of that year. Padbury was left in the care of a married couple, who absconded with his inheritance, leaving Padbury as a homeless orphan. He held multiple occupations in an attempt to support himself, including shepherding near York for a £10 salary at the age of 16. By 1863, Padbury had saved enough money to arrange for his mother and other family members to immigrate to Australia, becoming one of the first settlers in North West Australia, squatting on the territory of the indigenous Nyamal people surrounding the De Grey River. This venture failed after several years.

== Career ==
Despite his prior business failure, he remained interested in the North West. Later in life he found success in his ownership of a profitable flour-mill at Guildford. He was a committed member of the Royal Agricultural Society of Western Australia, serving as president from 1874 to 1876 and again in 1885. With the capital and stability afforded to him from his successful businesses, including a line of general stores, he often donated to charitable institutions and financially supported the endeavours of his extended family.

He had a long political career as well, serving as a member of the Perth City Council, chairman of the Guildford Municipal Council, and the member for Swan in the Western Australian Legislative Council from 1872 until his resignation in 1877.

== Death and legacy ==
He died in Perth on 18 April 1907 at the age of 89. His wife, Charlotte, had died earlier in February 1895. He was buried together with her in the family vault of East Perth Cemetery.

Padbury's will continued his philanthropy, leaving large sums of his money to multiple charitable institutions including the Waifs Home at Parkerville and the Swan Boys Orphanage.

The northern Perth suburb of Padbury was named for him in 1971.

== See also ==
- Padbury Buildings – Former development in Perth with a nearby plaque dedicated to him in 1990
- Thornlie, Western Australia – Suburb of Perth beginning as a farm owned by his niece and financed by Padbury.
