= Protector (1827) =

UK merchant and migrant ship 1827–1834

History

United Kingdom
- Name: Protector
- Builder: John Richard Portelow, Lincoln, New Brunswick
- Launched: 19 May 1827

General characteristics
- Class & type: barque
- Tons burthen: 3809/94, or 390, or 400 (bm)
- Length: 109 ft 1 in (33.2 m)
- Beam: 28 ft 3 1/2 in (8.6 m)

Protector was a barque built and launched in 1827 in Canada. She is mostly known for transporting colonists to the nascent Swan River Colony in February 1830. She was last mentioned in 1834.

== Career ==
She was built in Lincoln, New Brunswick, Canada as a three-masted barque with square stern, no galleries, and a bust figurehead. She was launched by John Richard Portelow on 19 May 1827, and on 3 November the following year was sold to a consortium of merchants in Bristol (England) — Edward Bevan (21 shares); William Cross (22 shares); and Francis Holladay (21 shares also). They appointed George Thomas as Master for her first voyage.

In 1829 she was re-registered with an altered construction comprising square rig, sham quarter galleries, and a female figurehead. Her first voyage proper was to the Swan River Colony, departing Gravesend on 11 October 1829. She arrived in Western Australia on 25 February 1830. Amongst her passengers were Henry Ernest and Sarah Theodosia Hall, and their son William Shakespeare Hall.

The return voyage to England was via Mauritius and Calcutta.

Other ships that arrived in 1830 included: Calista, St. Leonard, Marquis of Anglesea (wrecked), Thomson, Amity, Georgia, Lotus, Tranby, Warrior, Britannia, Wanstead, Hooghly, Atwick, Governor Phillip, Euphemia, Aurelia, Orelia, Cumberland, Caroline, Admiral Gifford, Lion, Dragon, Gilmore, Norfolk, Nancy, Leda, and Skerne.

Year	Master	Owner	Trade	Source
1830	G.Thomas	Holliday & Co.	London–New South Wales	Lloyd's Register
1832	G.Thomas; L.Mathias	Holliday & Co.	Bristol–New York	LR
1833	Mathias; Lewis	Cross & Co. Captain & Co.	Bristol–London; Liverpool–New Orleans	Register of Shipping

Protector, late Mathias, arrived at Liverpool on 1 May 1833. She had come from Savannah in 25 days.

On 9 July, Protector, Lewis, master, having come from New Orleans, grounded in Prince's Basin, Liverpool, as she was setting out for Savannah, but was gotten off and brought into dock.

== Fate ==
Protector, Lewis, master, arrived at Liverpool from New Orleans on 9 January 1834. Her registry was closed at Londonderry on 15 April.
