= Thomas Carey (Australian politician) =

Australian politician

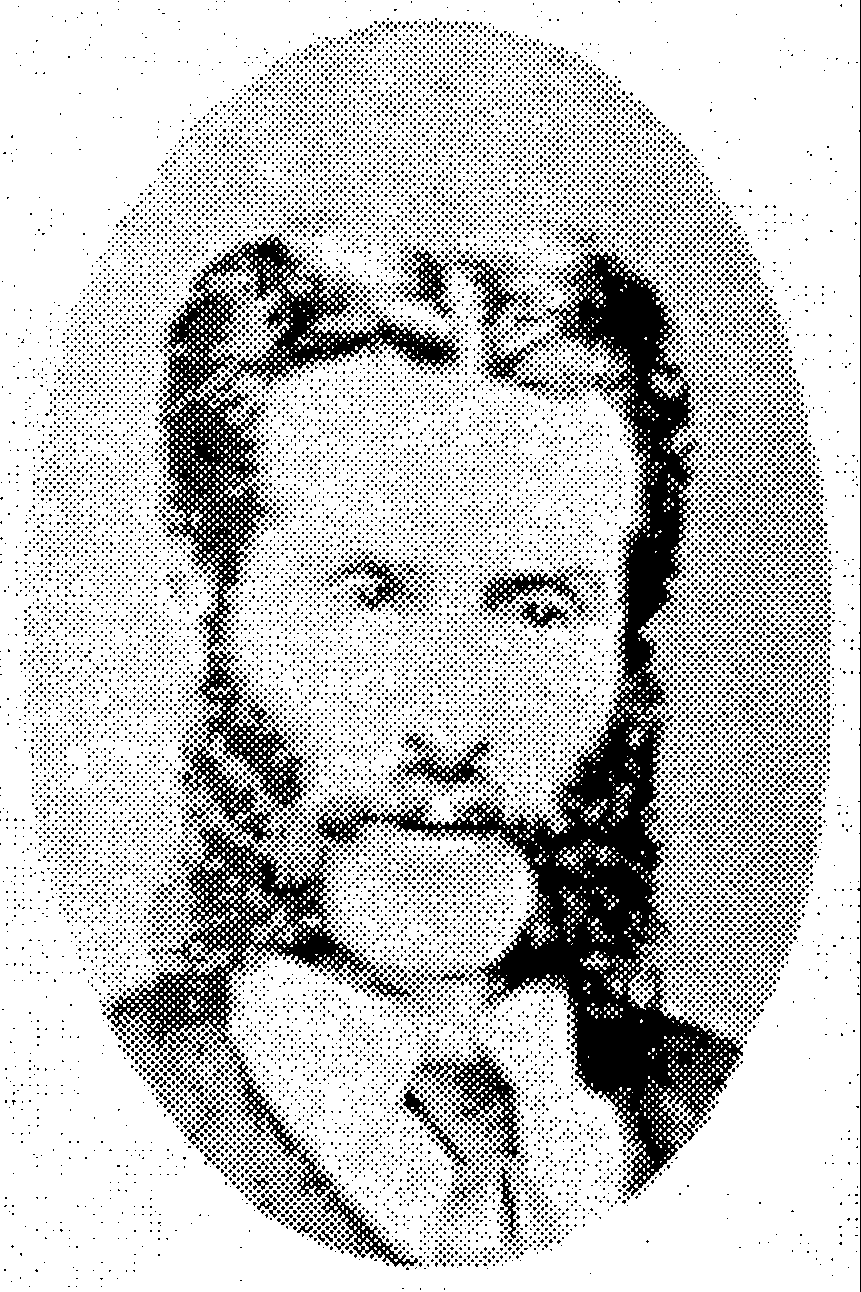
Thomas Campbell Carey

Thomas Campbell Carey (1832 or 1833 – 4 September 1884) was the surveyor to whom John and Alexander Forrest were apprenticed, and was later a Member of the Western Australian Legislative Council.

Thomas Carey was born in Ireland in 1832–33. Little is known of his youth, but he was employed as a draughtsman commanding the Engineer's Office at Chatham, and later in an Ordnance Survey as Land Agent and Surveyor. In September 1853, he married Eliza Shields Stewart.

In 1862, Carey emigrated to Western Australia, where he became an assistant surveyor for the colony's Survey Department. Over the next eight years, Carey was at various times stationed at Albany, Wellington and Bunbury. In November 1863, while stationed at Bunbury, Carey accepted as his apprentice a young John Forrest. Forrest graduated after two years, entering the Survey Department. In 1869 Carey apprenticed Forrest's younger brother Alex. He also became a Justice of the Peace in that year.

In May 1871, the new Surveyor-General of Western Australia Malcolm Fraser reorganised the Survey Department, promoting John Forrest and dismissing a number of surveyors including Carey and Alex Forrest. Carey then became a contract surveyor for the department, and also ran a private practice. He also began to get involved in public affairs, becoming a member of both the Bunbury Town Trust and the Bunbury Municipal Town Council in 1871, and chairman of both later that year. His first wife died in October 1871, and he was remarried in April 1874, to Rose Strickland.

On 25 June 1872, Carey was elected to the Legislative Council for the seat of Vasse. From 8 July 1873 until 28 October 1874, he was Chairman of Committees. He was defeated in the election of October 1874 by Robert Gale, but won the seat again in a by-election in March 1878, holding it until his death in 1884. In 1874, Carey was an unsuccessful defendant in a libel case. In August 1879, he suggested in Parliament that Forrest had made improper use of crown land, then followed it up by writing a letter to the Herald listing the land that was held by members of the Forrest family. The accusations generated much discussion, but most members of the Council supported Forrest, and no evidence of any wrongdoing was ever uncovered.

Thomas Carey died in Perth on 4 September 1884. He was survived by his second wife, four sons by his first marriage, and four daughters from his second.
