= Robert Walcott =

American historian (1910–1988)

- Born: January 24, 1910; Cambridge, Massachusetts, US
- Died: August 23, 1988 (aged 78); Dennis, Massachusetts, US

Academic background
- Education: St. Paul's School; Harvard College

Academic work
- Discipline: History
- Sub-discipline: 18th-century English politics

Robert Walcott (January 24, 1910 – August 23, 1988) was an American historian specializing in early 18th-century English politics.

== Early life and education ==
Robert Walcott was born in Cambridge, Massachusetts. He graduated from St. Paul's School and Harvard College.

== Augustan politics ==
Walcott subjected early 18th-century English politics to a Namierite analysis, arguing that it was dominated by various factions based on sectional and familial interests. He challenged the traditional view, espoused by G. M. Trevelyan and Sir Keith Feiling, that the politics of Queen Anne's reign was dominated by two parties (Whigs and Tories).

However Walcott's thesis came under increasing criticism. G. V. Bennett claimed that Walcott's book-length argument was "disastrous":

[Walcott's] methodology was patently at fault. Having created a card-index of biographical material for individual M.P.s, he attempted on this basis to allot them to the different political groups of his own theory. One connection, the "Newcastle-Pelham-Walpole" faction, clearly had no existence at all, as any acquaintance with known political correspondence would reveal. Other groups were inflated by the inclusion of men whose relationship with the leading political figure was of the flimsiest nature. Walcott had relied to an extreme degree on a specialized professional technique, and his work ignored not only the literature of the time but the great mass of political papers which were already available when he wrote.

In 1967 Walcott's thesis was superseded by Geoffrey Holmes' view that Anne's reign was indeed dominated by two parties. In 1992 Tim Harris claimed that Walcott's thesis was "now totally discredited".

Walcott died at his home in Dennis, Massachusetts on August 23, 1988.

== Works ==
- "English Party Politics, 1688-1714" in Essays in Modern English History in Honor of W. C. Abbott (Harvard, 1941).
- English Politics in the Early Eighteenth Century (Oxford: Oxford University Press, 1956).
