= Electoral district of Toodyay (Legislative Council) =

Former electoral district in Western Australia

Toodyay Western Australia—Legislative Council
- State: Western Australia
- Dates current: 1870–1890
- Namesake: Toodyay

Toodyay was an electoral district of the Legislative Council of Western Australia from 1870 to 1890, during the period when the Legislative Council was the sole chamber of the Parliament of Western Australia.

Toodyay was one of the original ten Legislative Council districts created by the Legislative Council Act 1870 (33 Vict, No. 13). The district's boundaries contained large portions of the northern and central Wheatbelt, including the townsites of Toodyay and Northam, among others. The district was bordered by the district of Swan to the south-west, the district of York to the south-east, and the district of Greenough to the north.

Four men represented Toodyay in the Legislative Council between 1870 and 1890, with George Shenton serving the longest (from 1875 to 1890). Shenton and his predecessor, Edward Hamersley, both continued on in the Legislative Council after 1890, as nominated members.

== Members ==
Member	Party	Term
James Drummond	None	1870–1873
Charles Dempster	None	1873–1874
Edward Hamersley	None	1874–1875
George Shenton	None	1875–1890
