= Electoral district of Wellington (Legislative Council) =

Wellington Western Australia—Legislative Council
- State: Western Australia
- Dates current: 1870–1890
- Namesake: Wellington Land District

Wellington was an electoral district of the Legislative Council of Western Australia from 1870 to 1890, during the period when the Legislative Council was the sole chamber of the Parliament of Western Australia.

Wellington was one of the original ten Legislative Council districts created by the Legislative Council Act 1870 (33 Vict, No. 13). The district's initial boundary had Bunbury as its main population centre, and reached north to Bannister and south to the Wonnerup Inlet, as well as east to the Great Australian Bight. It was bounded by the district of Fremantle to the north and the districts of Vasse and Albany to the south. After the passage of the Legislative Council Act Amendment Act 1873 (37 Vict. No. 22), the district's boundaries were altered, with some of its northern portions transferred to the new district of Murray and Williams. Murray and Williams replaced Fremantle as Wellington's northern neighbour.

Only two men were ever elected to represent Wellington in the Legislative Council – James Lee-Steere, who served from 1870 to 1880, and Harry Venn, who served from 1880 to 1890. Both went on to serve in the Legislative Assembly following the advent of responsible government in 1890.

== Members ==
Member	Party	Term
James Lee-Steere	None	1870–1880
Harry Venn	None	1880–1890
