= Edward Hamersley (senior) =

Australian politician

Edward Hamersley Sr.
- Born: 25 March 1810; Sandgate, Kent, England
- Died: 26 November 1874 (aged 64); Perth, Western Australia, Australia
- Education: Pembroke College, Cambridge
- Occupations: Landowner; Horsebreeder; Politician
- Spouse: Anne Louise Cornelis
- Children: Edward Hamersley (Jnr); Margaret Forrest; Samuel Hamersley
- Relatives: William Locke Brockman (brother-in-law)

Edward Hamersley (25 March 1810 – 26 November 1874) was an early settler in colonial Western Australia. He became a successful and wealthy pastoralist, and a member of the Western Australian Legislative Council. The Hamersley family became one of the most prominent families in the colony.

== Biography ==
=== Early life ===
Edward Hamersley was born in Sandgate, Kent on 25 March 1810. He was educated at Pembroke College, Cambridge, graduating BA in 1833. He then spent a number of years touring throughout Europe, during which time he married Anne Louise Cornelis in Paris. Their first son, Edward, was born in Paris in 1836.

=== Adult life ===
Around 1836, he decided to emigrate to Western Australia, largely on the basis of optimistic letters received from his sister Frances, who had moved to the colony with her husband William Locke Brockman in 1830. He sailed with his wife and son, arriving at Fremantle in February 1837. Upon arriving in Western Australia, he found many of the original settlers to be financially struggling, and he was able to obtain a number of large grants of land extremely cheaply. He then leased the land out, ensuring himself an income and allowing him to live in relative comfort in Perth. Economic conditions improved in the late 1830s, and his large land holdings brought him substantial wealth. In 1839, he became a partner in a horse breeding business with Samuel Pole Phillips, who had recently arrived in the colony, and in 1841 he became a director of the Western Australian Bank. However, late in 1842, the bottom dropped out of the wool market, and many settlers were ruined. His own losses were minor, but the colony overall was struggling, and he preferred not to remain there. He appointed an agent to manage his affairs in the colony, and in January 1843, the Hamersley family set sail for France. They would live there for the next six years.

In January 1850, he returned to Western Australia to secure the titles to some of his land. Upon arriving in the colony, he learned that his agent had died a few months before, leaving his affairs in a confused state. Thus, Hamersley spent some time sorting out his estate, then launched into a new horse breeding venture. He became a leading horse-breeder and was a foundation member of the Western Australian Turf Club when it formed in 1852. In 1851, he partnered with Phillips, Lockier Burges and Bart Vigors to form an enterprise known as "The Cattle Company". Each man applied for leases on the Irwin River in the newly opened Champion Bay district, thus securing for the company a virtual monopoly of land in the area. The company was well managed by Phillips, and big profits were made in the first few years. Hamersley continued investing his profits in various town and farm properties, with a view to securing the future of his many children. This diversification protected him somewhat when profits from The Cattle Company fell away in the early 1860s. Phillips, who had not diversified, suffered great financial losses during this time, and a rift developed between the two men when Hamersley refused to increase Phillips book-keeping allowance.

In June 1857, Hamersley and Phillips were both nominated to the Legislative Council. Initially they sided together, successfully fighting a proposal that Western Australia accept female convicts. Later, they opposed one another over the issue of representative government which Hamersley favoured, and this added to the ill feeling between the two. When the governor rejected a petition calling for elections, Hamersley resigned from the Council in protest. In 1861 Hammersley financed an exploratory team led by Francis Thomas Gregory to the Australian far Northwest. In gratitude the team named the Hammersley Range after him. The Cattle Company was dissolved at the end of 1867, primarily because of the rift between Hamersley and Phillips. In 1870, he retired in Perth.

=== Death ===
Hamersley died in Perth on 26 November 1874. He was buried in East Perth Cemetery with his wife.
