= Electoral district of Vasse (Legislative Council) =

Vasse Western Australia—Legislative Council
- State: Western Australia
- Dates current: 1870–1890
- Namesake: Vasse River

Vasse was an electoral district of the Legislative Council of Western Australia from 1870 to 1890, during the period when the Legislative Council was the sole chamber of the Parliament of Western Australia.

Vasse was one of the original ten Legislative Council districts created by the Legislative Council Act 1870 (33 Vict, No. 13). The district's eastern boundary was a line running north-east from Point D'Entrecasteaux to the junction of the Balgarup and Arthur Rivers. Its northern boundary ran along the Blackwood River, Padbury Brook, and the Capel River, and then true west to the north end of Wonnerup Inlet. The district was bordered by the district of Wellington to the north and the district of Albany to the south-east.

Five men represented Vasse in the Legislative Council between 1870 and 1890, with Thomas Carey serving two non-consecutive terms (from 1872 to 1874 and again from 1878 to 1884). Stephen Henry Parker, the MLC for Vasse from 1888 to 1890, went on to become Chief Justice of Western Australia.

== Members ==
Member	Party	Term
John Bussell	None	1870–1872
Thomas Carey	None	1872–1874
Richard Gale	None	1874–1878
Thomas Carey	None	1878–1884
George Layman	None	1884–1888
Stephen Henry Parker	None	1888–1890
