= William Locke Brockman =

Australian politician

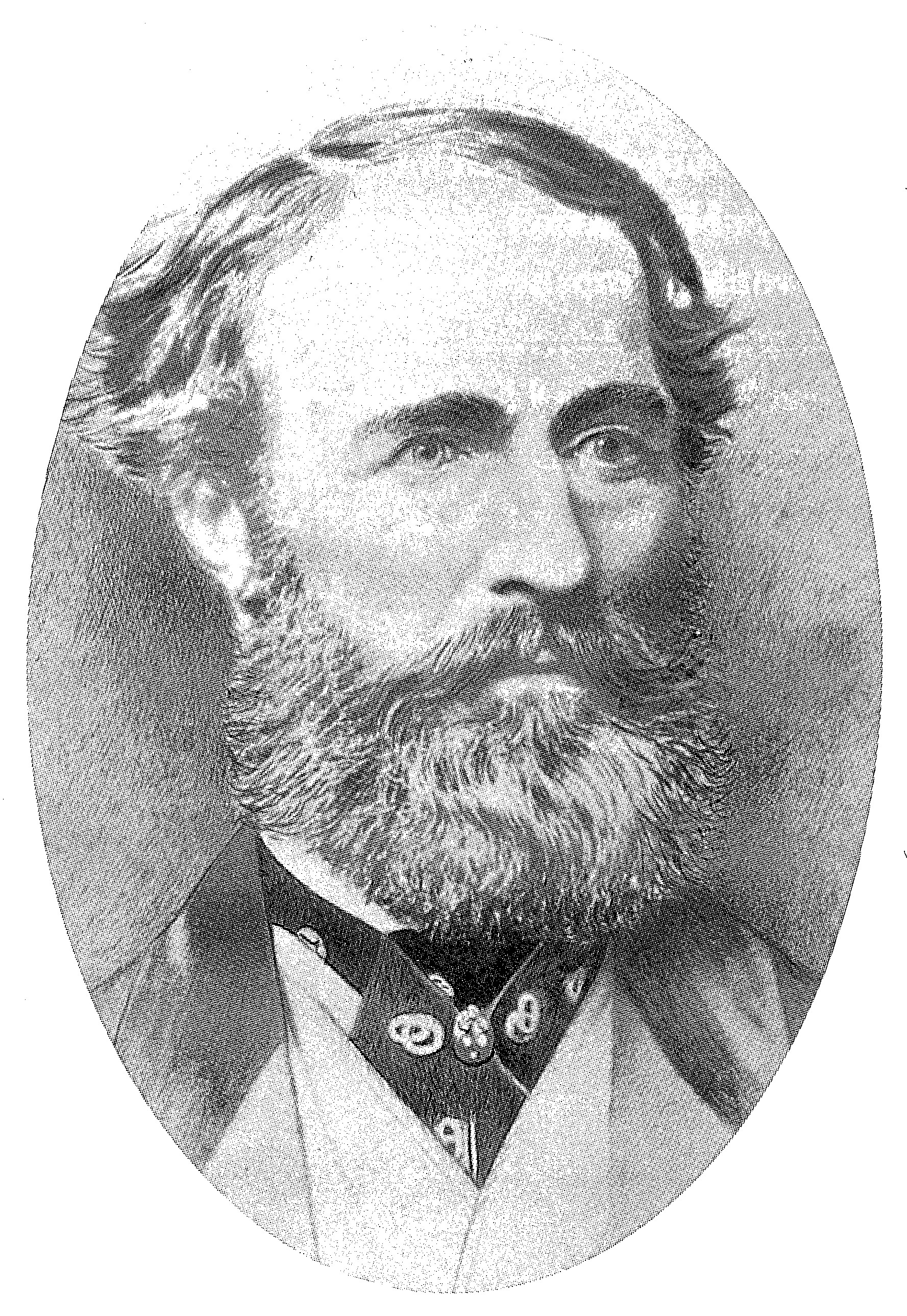
- Born: 1802; Cheriton, Kent, England
- Died: 28 November 1872 (aged 69–70); Herne Hill, Western Australia, Australia
- Occupations: Farmer; Politician
- Spouse: Ann Frances Hamersley (1827–72; his death)
- Children: Henry Brockman; Edmund Ralph Brockman

William Locke Brockman (1802 – 28 November 1872) was an early settler in Western Australia, who became a pastoralist and stock breeder, and a Member of the Western Australian Legislative Council.

== Biography ==
Born in Kent, England, in 1802, William Locke Brockman was a member of the Brockman family, a Kent family with a history dating back to the 14th century. Little is known of his early life, except that he was a farmer with land in the Romney Marsh area. In 1827, Brockman married Ann Francis Elizabeth Hamersley (1809–1876). They had six sons and three daughters.

In 1829, Brockman, with his wife and eldest son Edmund, emigrated to the Swan River Colony in Western Australia. They arrived on Minstrel in January 1830. Brockman brought with him a prefabricated house, seven servants, and a number of sheep. Under the colony's system of land grants, this entitled him to a grant of over 81 km^{2} (20,000 acres). He was the ninth person to be granted land in the colony.

He established himself as a pastoralist and wheat grower in the Upper Swan district. He named his grant Herne Hill, and this name survives today as the name of the Perth suburb of Herne Hill. He was a foundation member of the Swan Agricultural Society in 1831, and in 1833 became a justice of the peace. In 1837, he constructed a mill on his property. His success as a farmer prompted his wife's brother Edward Hamersley to immigrate. Hamersley arrived with his wife and son Edward in February 1837. He ultimately became a successful and wealthy pastoralist, and a member of the Western Australian Legislative Council, and the Hamersley family became one of the most prominent families in the colony.

In 1839, he was nominated to the Western Australian Legislative Council, but he resigned the following year. From around 1845, he began exporting horses to India. He later acquired land near Northam, and was the first person to take up land in what is now the Shire of Bindoon. For this reason, the Brockman River, which flows through the Bindoon Shire, was named after him. Local Aboriginal people showed him the land around Gingin and because it had permanent water, he took up land there in 1841. He called the property Cheriton after the parish of his father, the Reverend Julius Drake-Brockman. A water-powered mill was built over the Gingin Brook by Alfred Carson, and wheat was milled into flour, helping relieve the colony's dependence on imported flour. Due to favourable soils, the property became the principal source of citrus fruit for Perth, and was especially known for what came to be called Cheriton oranges. It is thought that he had sourced the seeds in the Canary Islands.

In the 1860s, he became involved in the public push for representative government. Eventually, the Governor of Western Australia agreed to hold informal Legislative Council elections, on the understanding that he would nominate those elected. In the informal election of May 1867, he was elected for Guildford, and was accordingly nominated to the council. He held the nominative seat until July 1870, when the council became formally elective. He contested the seat of Swan in the subsequent election, but was defeated by Thomas Courthope Gull. Two years later he contested the seat again, this time defeating Gull. He held the seat until his death at Herne Hill on 28 November 1872.

Two of his sons, Henry and Edmund Ralph, became farmers in the colony and Members of the Legislative Council.
