= Electoral district of Greenough (Legislative Council) =

Greenough Western Australia—Legislative Council
- State: Western Australia
- Dates current: 1870–1890
- Namesake: Greenough River

Greenough was an electoral district of the Legislative Council of Western Australia from 1870 to 1890, during the period when the Legislative Council was the sole chamber of the Parliament of Western Australia.

Greenough was one of the original ten Legislative Council districts created by the Legislative Council Act 1870 (33 Vict, No. 13). In the west, the district's boundaries contained areas of the southern Mid West (south of the mouth of the Greenough River) and northern Wheatbelt. It also ran inland to the border with South Australia, though those regions were almost unpopulated at the time. The major settlement in the district was the town of Greenough.

Four men represented Greenough in the Legislative Council between 1870 and 1890, with Charles Crowther serving the longest (from 1873 to 1887). The district's final member, William Loton, was elected to the Legislative Assembly after the advent of responsible government in 1890.

== Members ==
Member	Party	Term
George Shenton	None	1870–1873
Charles Crowther	None	1873–1887
Alfred Hensman	None	1887–1889
William Loton	None	1889–1890
