= Charles Dempster (Australian politician) =

Australian politician

- Succeeded by: George Throssell
- Constituency: East Province

Personal details
- Born: 19 December 1839 Fremantle, Western Australia
- Died: 22 July 1907 (aged 67) Sydney, New South Wales
- Spouse: Mary Bussell
- Profession: Farmer and grazier

Charles Edward Dempster (19 December 1839 – 22 July 1907) was a politician in Western Australia, serving two terms in the Legislative Council—as the member for the seat of Toodyay from 1873 to 1874, and as one of the three East Province members from 1894 until 1907. A farmer and grazier by trade, he was also one of the first European explorers of the Esperance district as well as a councillor and chairman on the Toodyay and Northam Road Boards for many years.

== Biography ==
Dempster was born in Fremantle, Western Australia, to James McLean Dempster, a sea captain, and Ann Ellen Pratt. He was educated at Lowe's School in Fremantle and at Reverend Dacres Williams' School in Guildford. In the 1860s, he, his brother Andrew and fellow pastoralists Charles Harper and Barnard Clarkson undertook various explorations. In 1864, he and his brother became the first European explorers to reach the Esperance district, and they opened up a stock route to the markets at Perth. By 1866, he had become the manager of the family property, Buckland, at Northam, and on 5 March 1867, he married Mary Bussell, with whom he was to have three sons and four daughters.

In 1870 the brothers developed a station at Fraser Range with the assistance of ticket of leave men from Perth who were employed to develop the station land and build various stone structures. The station had been founded by John and Alexander Forrest on their way to Adelaide, and was the first sheep station on the Nullarbor Plain. In 1871, the Dempsters acquired the cutter Gypsy which was used to sail wool to Adelaide, stores and stock from Fremantle and hunt seals at the islands off Esperance.

In 1872, he inherited a property at Northam and Toodyay, and was elected to the Toodyay Road Board, on which he served until 1885. On 11 March 1873, he was elected at a by-election to the Toodyay seat in the Legislative Council, which he held until 29 September 1874. Over the next few years, he and his brothers bought the Drummond steam mill and farm in the Toodyay valley, as well as the steam mill and store in Toodyay (then known as Newcastle) itself, and Vine Cottage, where he and his family relocated in 1877. In 1880, Dempster won awards at the Melbourne Colonial Exhibition for flour produced at the mills.

In 1886, after selling the steam mill and store to George Throssell, Dempster purchased the 1,560 acres (630 ha) Springfield estate near Northam, and farmed at Wongamine. As a foundation member of the Northam and Newcastle Settlers' Association which advocated for loans to small farmers, he was elected in 1886 to the Northam Road Board, on which he served until 1897. He became prominent in horse breeding and racing and helped to found the Northam Race Club, later becoming its secretary; he also was a member of the prestigious Western Australian Turf Club, which provided a meeting place for many of the Colony's leading men of that time. In 1888, he was made a Justice of the Peace.

Following a failed attempt to secure the Legislative Assembly seat of Toodyay in the inaugural elections under responsible government in 1890, he won the highest vote and a six-year term in the Legislative Council for the East Province when that body became fully elective in July 1894. He was to hold the seat until his death while visiting Sydney on 22 July 1907. He was buried at the Northam cemetery.

His eldest son, William P. Dempster, married Mabel Pattie Solomon (1877–1924), daughter of Saul Solomon, South Australian MP and distinguished citizen of Northam.
