= John Monger =

Australian politician

The Honourable John Henry Monger
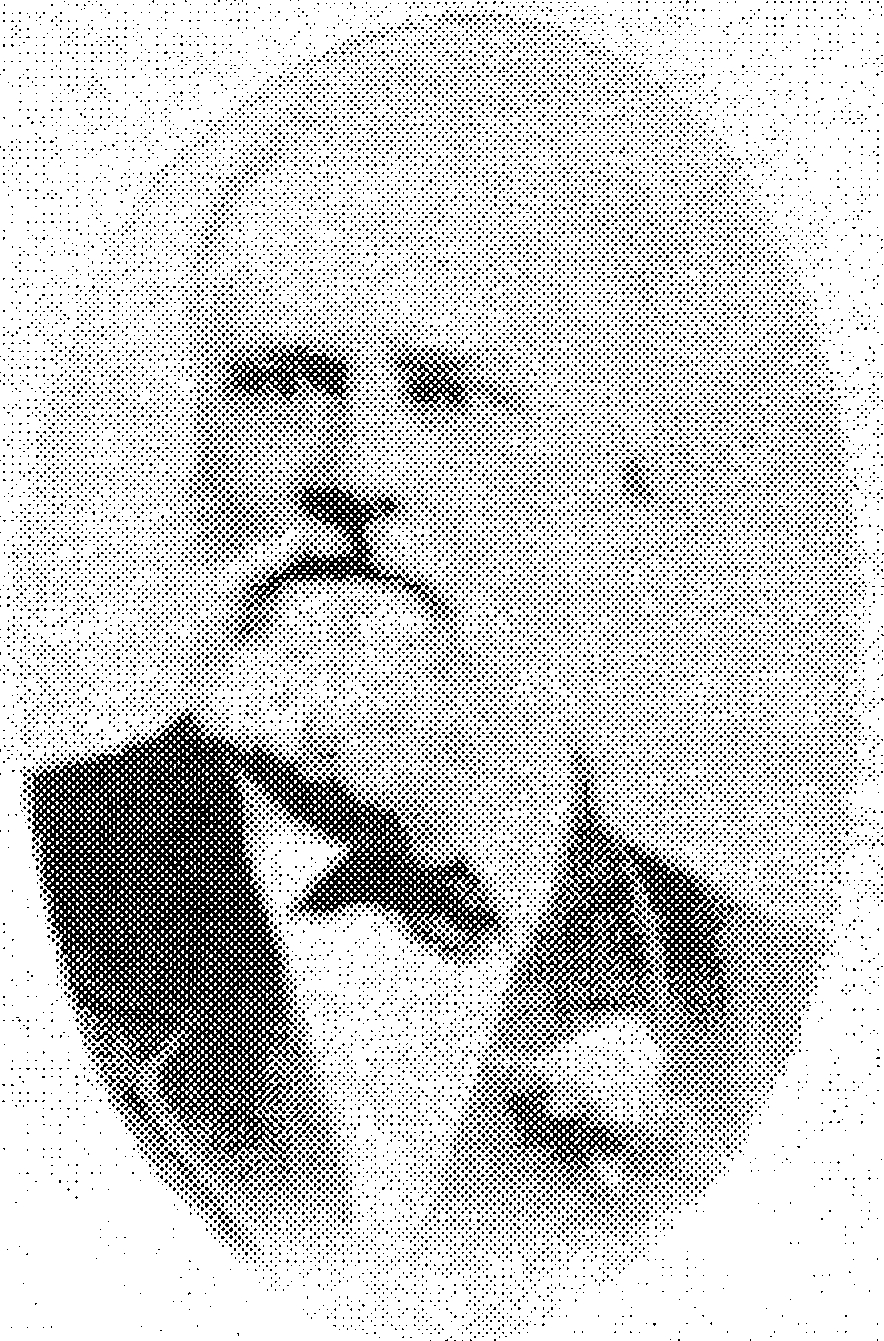
- John Henry Monger

Member of the Western Australian Parliament for York
- In office 1870–1875

Member of the Western Australian Parliament for York
- In office 24 December 1890 – 23 December 1892

Personal details
- Born: 25 January 1831 Perth, Western Australia
- Died: 23 December 1892 (aged 61) York, Western Australia
- Resting place: Wesleyan Cemetery, East Perth
- Spouse: Henrietta Joaquina Manning

John Henry Monger Jr (25 January 1831 – 23 December 1892) was a Member of the Western Australian Legislative Council from 1870 to 1875, and again from 1890 to 1892.

Monger was born in Perth, Western Australia in 1831; his father, John Henry Monger Snr, was a prominent York merchant. His younger brother, Joseph Taylor Monger, would also become a York merchant and a Member of the Legislative Council. Monger spent much of his early life in England, and again visited England in 1856–57, where he married Henrietta Joaquina Manning on 21 July 1857. They would have 4 sons and 4 daughters.

On returning to Western Australia, Monger established himself as a merchant at York, competing against his father and brother. He later appointed Herman Moll to manage his York business, while he expanded his business into other areas of the colony, including the goldfields, and opened a head office in Perth with his brothers. He partnered with George Shenton in the shipping trade, and was interested in the sandalwood industry. Later he diversified into agriculture and pastoralism, holding large pastoral stations east of York, and in the South West, Pilbara and Kimberley region of Western Australia regions. For some time he was in partnership with Aubrey Brown, a brother of Maitland and Kenneth Brown. The two men selected over 100,000 acres (400 km^{2}) of land on the Gascoyne River, and also held a lease on Dirk Hartog Island. The partnership was dissolved in January 1888. Monger also became a foundation vice-president of the Western Australian Cricket Association (WACA).

When Western Australia obtained representative government in October 1870, Monger was elected to the Legislative Council. He held the position until his resignation in June 1875; his brother Joseph won the subsequent by-election. After Western Australia won responsible government in 1890, the Legislative Council became a nominative upper house. On 24 December 1890, Monger was nominated to the Legislative Council by the governor. He held the seat until his death at York on 23 February 1892.

Monger's son Frederick was a Member of the Western Australian Legislative Assembly for twenty years.
