= Members of the Western Australian Legislative Council, 1884–1889 =

This is a list of members of the Western Australian Legislative Council from November 1884 to December 1888. When the Council first met it had 24 members. Sixteen were elected and eight were appointed by the Crown. Four of the appointed members sat as the Colonial Secretary, the Attorney-General, the Surveyor-General and the Director of Public Works. The other four were private citizens chosen by the Governor. They did not represent a district.

The Legislative Council Act Amendment Act 1886 (50 Vict, No. 10) raised the number of members to 26, with 17 elected and 9 appointed. It divided the North District in two. The northern part became the Kimberley District, with one member. The rest stayed as the North District and kept its two members.

Writs for the general election were issued on 15 September 1884. The results for every district except the Gascoyne and the North were announced on 11 November, and for the Gascoyne and the North on 16 December. The new Council first met on 22 July 1885 and re-elected Luke Leake as Speaker. After Leake's death, the Council elected James Lee Steere as Speaker on 21 June 1886. It sat for the last time on 7 December 1888.

Name	District/Office	Years in office
Edmund Ralph Brockman^{[d]}	Nominee	1878–1880; 1887–1889; 1890–1891
Henry Brockman	Swan	1884–1889
Maitland Brown^{[h]}	Gascoyne	1870–1872; 1874–1876; 1876–1886
Thomas Burges^{[d]}	Nominee	1874–1878; 1885–1887; 1890–1893
Septimus Burt^{[a]}^{[g]}^{[j]}	Murray and Williams; Attorney-General; North	1874–1879; 1880–1886; 1886; 1888–1890
Sir Thomas Cockburn-Campbell	Albany	1872–1874; 1874–1889; 1889–1890; 1890–1892
Daniel Congdon^{[d]}	Nominee	1887–1890; 1892–1900
Charles Crowther^{[i]}	Greenough	1873–1887
Theodore Fawcett^{[g]}	Murray and Williams	1886–1889
Alexander Forrest	Kimberley	1887–1890
John Forrest^{[c]}	Surveyor-General	1883–1887; 1888–1890
Malcolm Fraser^{[b]}	Colonial Secretary	1870–1886; 1887–1890
McKenzie Grant^{[j]}	North	1880–1887; 1889–1890; 1890–1893
Charles Harper	York	1878–1880; 1884–1890
Alfred Hensman^{[a]}^{[i]}	Attorney-General; Greenough	1883–1886; 1887–1889
John Horgan^{[e]}	Perth	1888–1889
John James^{[c]}	Commissioner of Land Titles	1887–1888
Edward Keane^{[f]}	Geraldton	1886–1890
George Layman^{[e]}	Vasse	1884–1888
George Leake^{[a]}^{[c]}	Attorney-General; Nominee	1886; 1888
Sir Luke Leake^{[e]}	Perth	1870–1886
James Lee Steere^{[d]}	Nominee	1868–1880; 1880–1884; 1885–1890
William Loton^{[d]}	Nominee	1884–1887; 1889–1890; 1898–1900; 1902–1908
William Marmion	Fremantle	1870–1890
Alexander McRae^{[j]}	North	1883–1888
Samuel Mitchell^{[f]}	Geraldton	1884–1885
James Morrison^{[d]}	Nominee	1887–1890; 1890–1894
Stephen Henry Parker^{[e]}	Perth; Vasse	1878–1890; 1892–1897
William Silas Pearse	Fremantle	1872–1880; 1884–1890
George Randell^{[d]}	Nominee	1875–1878; 1880–1890; 1893–1894; 1897–1910
Alexander Richardson^{[j]}	North	1887–1890
Edward Scott^{[e]}	Perth	1886–1890
George Shenton	Toodyay	1870–1873; 1875–1906
Horace Sholl^{[j]}	North	1888
Robert Frederick Sholl^{[h]}	Gascoyne	1886–1890; 1904–1909
Matthew Smith^{[b]}	Colonial Secretary	1886–1887
Harry Venn^{[k]}	Wellington	1880–1890
Charles Warton^{[a]}	Attorney-General	1886–1890
Edward Wittenoom^{[f]}	Geraldton	1883–1884; 1885–1886; 1894–1898; 1902–1906; 1910–1934
John Wright	Director of Public Works	1885–1889; 1890–1894

== Notes ==
^{a} Alfred Hensman, the Attorney-General, left the Council on 18 June 1886. Septimus Burt sat as Acting Attorney-General until 7 September 1886, followed by George Leake. Charles Warton, the new Attorney-General, took the seat on 3 December 1886.
^{b} Malcolm Fraser, the Colonial Secretary, left the Council on 18 June 1886. Matthew Smith, the Acting Colonial Secretary, sat in his place until he died on 18 April 1887. Fraser was reappointed on 9 June 1887.
^{c} John Forrest, the Surveyor-General, left the Council on 9 June 1887. John James, the Commissioner of Land Titles, was appointed the same day. James resigned on 4 January 1888 and George Leake was appointed in his place. Leake resigned on 6 March 1888 and Forrest was reappointed.
^{d} George Randell, William Loton, James Lee Steere and Thomas Burges were appointed on 11 July 1885. Burges resigned on 9 June 1887, and Edmund Ralph Brockman and Daniel Congdon were appointed the same day. Loton resigned on 13 December 1887 and James Morrison was appointed in his place.
^{e} Luke Leake, one of the two members for Perth, died on 1 May 1886. Edward Scott won the by-election on 15 June 1886. Stephen Henry Parker resigned on 19 April 1888 and John Horgan won the by-election on 28 May 1888. George Layman, the member for Vasse, resigned on 31 July 1888, and Parker won the by-election on 12 September 1888.
^{f} Samuel Mitchell, the member for Geraldton, resigned on 28 May 1885. Edward Wittenoom won the by-election on 25 June 1885. He resigned on 6 November 1886 and Edward Keane won the by-election on 20 December 1886.
^{g} Septimus Burt, the member for Murray and Williams, resigned on 12 April 1886. Theodore Fawcett won the by-election on 12 May 1886.
^{h} Maitland Brown, the member for the Gascoyne, resigned on 7 April 1886. Robert Frederick Sholl won the by-election on 20 May 1886.
^{i} Charles Crowther, the member for Greenough, resigned on 29 April 1887. Alfred Hensman won the by-election on 3 June 1887.
^{j} McKenzie Grant, one of the two members for the North, resigned on 29 April 1887. Alexander Richardson won the by-election on 14 June 1887. Alexander McRae died on 24 February 1888. Horace Sholl won the by-election on 14 April 1888 but resigned on 26 June 1888. Burt won the next by-election on 28 July 1888.
^{k} David Hay was elected for Wellington at the general election, but the result was declared void and Harry Venn kept the seat.
