= Members of the Western Australian Legislative Council, 1880–1884 =

This is a list of members of the Western Australian Legislative Council from February 1880 to September 1884. When the Council first met it had 21 members. Fourteen were elected and seven were appointed by the Crown. Three of the appointed members sat as the Colonial Secretary, the Attorney-General and the Surveyor-General. The other four were private citizens chosen by the Governor. They did not represent a district.

The Legislative Council Act Amendment Act 1882 (46 Vict, No. 24) raised the number of members to 24, with 16 elected and 8 appointed. It divided the North District in two. The southern part became the Gascoyne District, with one member. The rest stayed as the North District and returned two members instead of one. From July 1883 the Director of Public Works also sat in the Council as an appointed member.

Writs for the general election were issued on 10 January 1880. The results for every district except the North were announced on 28 February, and for the North on 16 April. The new Council first met on 19 July 1880 and re-elected Luke Leake as Speaker. It sat for the last time on 13 September 1884.

| Name | District/Office | Years in office |
|---|---|---|
| Maitland Brown^{[f]} | Geraldton; Gascoyne | 1870–1872; 1874–1876; 1876–1886 |
| Lockier Burges^{[d]} | Nominee | 1879–1884 |
| Septimus Burt | Murray and Williams | 1874–1879; 1880–1886; 1886; 1888–1890 |
| Thomas Carey^{[h]} | Vasse | 1872–1874; 1878–1884 |
| Sir Thomas Cockburn-Campbell | Albany | 1872–1874; 1874–1889; 1889–1890; 1890–1892 |
| Charles Crowther | Greenough | 1873–1887 |
| John Davis^{[f]} | Geraldton | 1884 |
| John Forrest^{[b]} | Surveyor-General | 1883–1887; 1888–1890 |
| Malcolm Fraser^{[b]} | Surveyor-General; Colonial Secretary | 1870–1886; 1887–1890 |
| Edric Gifford^{[b]} | Colonial Secretary | 1880–1883 |
| George Glyde^{[d]} | Nominee | 1874–1879; 1882–1885; 1892–1894 |
| Roger Goldsworthy^{[b]} | Colonial Secretary | 1877–1880 |
| McKenzie Grant^{[g]} | North | 1880–1887; 1889–1890; 1890–1893 |
| Edward Hamersley | York | 1874–1875; 1880–1884; 1890–1894 |
| Alfred Hensman^{[a]} | Attorney-General | 1883–1886; 1887–1889 |
| Edward Higham | Fremantle | 1880–1884 |
| Edward Hooley^{[e]} | Swan | 1880; 1891–1894 |
| George Walpole Leake^{[a]} | Attorney-General | 1874–1875; 1879; 1880–1881; 1883; 1890–1894 |
| Sir Luke Leake | Perth | 1870–1886 |
| James Lee Steere^{[e]} | Swan | 1868–1880; 1880–1884; 1885–1890 |
| William Loton^{[d]} | Nominee | 1884–1887; 1889–1890; 1898–1900; 1902–1908 |
| William Marmion | Fremantle | 1870–1890 |
| Clayton Mason^{[c]} | Director of Public Works | 1884–1885 |
| Alexander McRae^{[g]} | North | 1883–1888 |
| Alexander Onslow^{[a]} | Attorney-General | 1881–1883 |
| Stephen Henry Parker | Perth | 1878–1890; 1892–1897 |
| Stephen Stanley Parker^{[d]} | Nominee | 1876–1885 |
| George Randell^{[d]} | Nominee | 1875–1878; 1880–1890; 1893–1894; 1897–1910 |
| George Shenton | Toodyay | 1870–1873; 1875–1906 |
| Edward Stone^{[d]} | Nominee | 1879–1880; 1880–1882 |
| James Henry Thomas^{[c]} | Director of Public Works | 1883–1884 |
| Harry Venn | Wellington | 1880–1890 |
| Edward Wittenoom^{[f]} | Geraldton | 1883–1884; 1885–1886; 1894–1898; 1902–1906; 1910–1934 |

== Notes ==
^{a} George Walpole Leake sat as Acting Attorney-General when the Council first met. Alexander Onslow became Attorney-General on 21 March 1881 and took his place. Onslow left the Council on 9 April 1883 and Leake filled the seat again until 10 July 1883, when Alfred Hensman became Attorney-General.
^{b} Roger Goldsworthy resigned as Colonial Secretary on 7 September 1880. Edric Gifford became Colonial Secretary and took the seat on 2 November 1880. He left the colony in January 1883. Malcolm Fraser, until then the Surveyor-General, became Colonial Secretary on 5 January 1883, and John Forrest became Surveyor-General. Forrest joined the Council on 10 January 1883.
^{c} The 1882 Act added an eighth appointed member. James Henry Thomas, the Director of Public Works and Commissioner of Railways, was appointed on 10 July 1883. He died on 16 July 1884. Clayton Mason, who succeeded him as Director of Public Works, took his seat on 18 July 1884.
^{d} Stephen Stanley Parker, Lockier Burges and George Randell were appointed on 5 July 1880, and Edward Stone on 15 July 1880. Stone left the Council on 3 July 1882, the day after George Glyde was appointed. Burges left on 2 July 1884 and William Loton was appointed on 14 July 1884.
^{e} Edward Hooley, the member for Swan, resigned on 23 April 1880. James Lee Steere, who had sat for Wellington until the general election, won the by-election on 22 May 1880.
^{f} Maitland Brown resigned as the member for Geraldton on 10 April 1883 and was elected for the new Gascoyne District on 26 April 1883. Edward Wittenoom won the Geraldton by-election on 30 May 1883. He resigned on 23 January 1884 and John Davis won the by-election on 12 March 1884.
^{g} The 1882 Act gave the North District a second member. McKenzie Grant kept the seat he had held since 1880, and Alexander McRae was elected to the new seat on 23 May 1883.
^{h} Thomas Carey, the member for Vasse, died on 4 September 1884.
