= Septimus Burt =

Western Australian lawyer and politician

The Honourable Septimus Burt KC
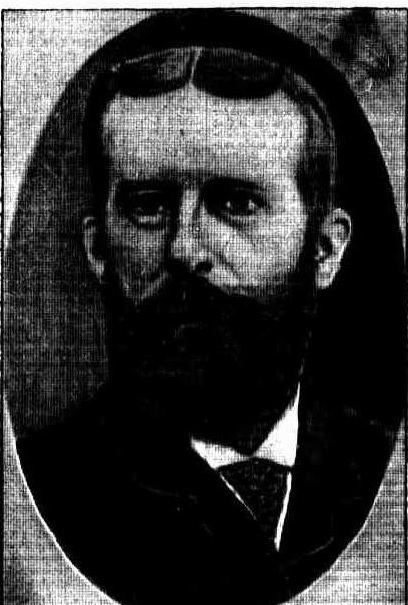
- Burt in 1892

Attorney-General of Western Australia
- In office 29 December 1890 – 27 October 1897
- Premier: John Forrest
- Preceded by: Charles Warton
- Succeeded by: Richard Pennefather

Personal details
- Born: 25 October 1847 St Kitts, British West Indies
- Died: 15 May 1919 (aged 71) Perth, Australia
- Occupation: Lawyer

The Hon Septimus Burt KC (25 October 1847 – 15 May 1919) was a Western Australian lawyer, politician and grazier, the son of Sir Archibald Burt.

Burt was born on 25 October 1847 at St Kitts in the West Indies, and educated at a private school at Melksham, Wiltshire, England. His family had been resident in the West Indies since 1635, primarily involved in administration of the Leeward Islands and in sugar plantations. Burt's great-great-great-uncle, William Mathew Burt, was governor-general (1776–1781) of the Leeward Islands during the American War of Independence.

In January 1861 Burt arrived in Western Australia with his parents, and subsequently attended Hale School in Perth.

He served as an articled clerk to George Frederick Stone, and was admitted to the bar in 1870. In 1876, Burt went into partnership with Edward Albert Stone (George Frederick's son), in the firm Stone and Burt.

He was offered a knighthood in 1901 – Knight Commander of St Michael and St George (KCMG) – but declined it. He also declined several invitations to join the bench of the Supreme Court, including the position of chief justice at the request of Premier George Leake in 1901.

He died on 15 May 1919, and is buried at Karrakatta Cemetery.

== Political career ==
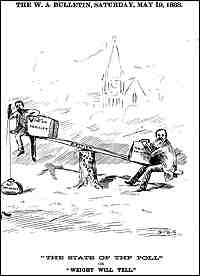
An 1888 political cartoon supporting the election of John Horgan instead of his opponent Septimus Burt

In 1874 Burt accepted a nominated membership of the Western Australian Legislative Council. In 1879 he relinquished that nominee membership, and in the general election of 1880 was elected unopposed for the district of Murray and Williams.

In March 1886 Burt resigned from his seat on the Legislative Council to accept the position of acting attorney-general after the sudden resignation of the incumbent Alfred Hensman. Burt remained as attorney-general until December 1886.

In 1887 Burt was appointed one of Western Australia's two representatives to the First Colonial Conference in London. He was also appointed Queen's Counsel.

In May 1888 Burt contested a by-election for the Perth seat in the Legislative Council, but lost to John Horgan. In July of that year, he was elected to the Legislative Council's North District seat. When Western Australia gained self-government in 1890, he was elected unopposed as the inaugural Legislative Assembly member for Ashburton, and held that seat until he retired from politics in 1900. During this time he was attorney-general (1890–1897), was acting premier when the leader, Sir John Forrest, was absent from the state, and was responsible for the creation of the Western Australian agent-general's office in London and acted in that position from 1891 to 1892. Sir Malcolm Fraser KCMG took over in 1892 as the official agent-general for Western Australia. Burt was also a member of the Executive Council (1890–1901). He also served as "minister without portfolio" from 1897 to 1900.

From 1881 to 1889, Burt was a member of the Perth City Council.

== Pastoral interests ==
In 1877 Burt formed a syndicate with John, Alexander and David Forrest and took up a 240,000-hectare (590,000-acre) lease of land on the Ashburton River. This lease became known as Minderoo Station. He was also owner or part-owner of other properties, including Kadji Kadji, Brick House (near Carnarvon), Yinnetharra, (Note: The Australian Dictionary of Biography and Biographical Register of Members of the Parliament of Western Australia spell the station name as "Yinniethana", apparently incorrectly.) Red Hill, Gifford Creek and Minne Creek. The syndicate was dissolved in later years, with the families taking separate ownership of the properties.

== Personal life ==
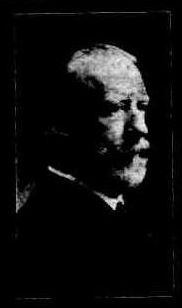
Septimus Burt c. 1910

Burt married Louisa Fanny Hare (daughter of Gustavus Edward Cockburn Hare-Naylor and Sarah Annie Wright) in 1872. The couple had ten children. Their daughter Annie married member of parliament Arthur Jenkins.

He was a synodsman, trustee and legal advisor for the Church of England, and a close friend of Archbishop Charles Riley.

In May 1896 Burt and 5 of his 6 sons played a significant part in the establishment of association football in Western Australia.

In 1917 Burt and his wife funded and donated to the church the Burt Memorial Hall on St Georges Terrace, as a memorial to their two sons killed during World War I. Initially it was to commemorate their son Theodore, who died in 1917, but a second son, Francis, was killed in 1918 before the construction was complete.

Burt was captain of the Perth Cricketers in 1871, president of the Carnarvon Club 1917–1918, and a foundation member of the Weld Club.
