= Horace Sholl =

Australian politician

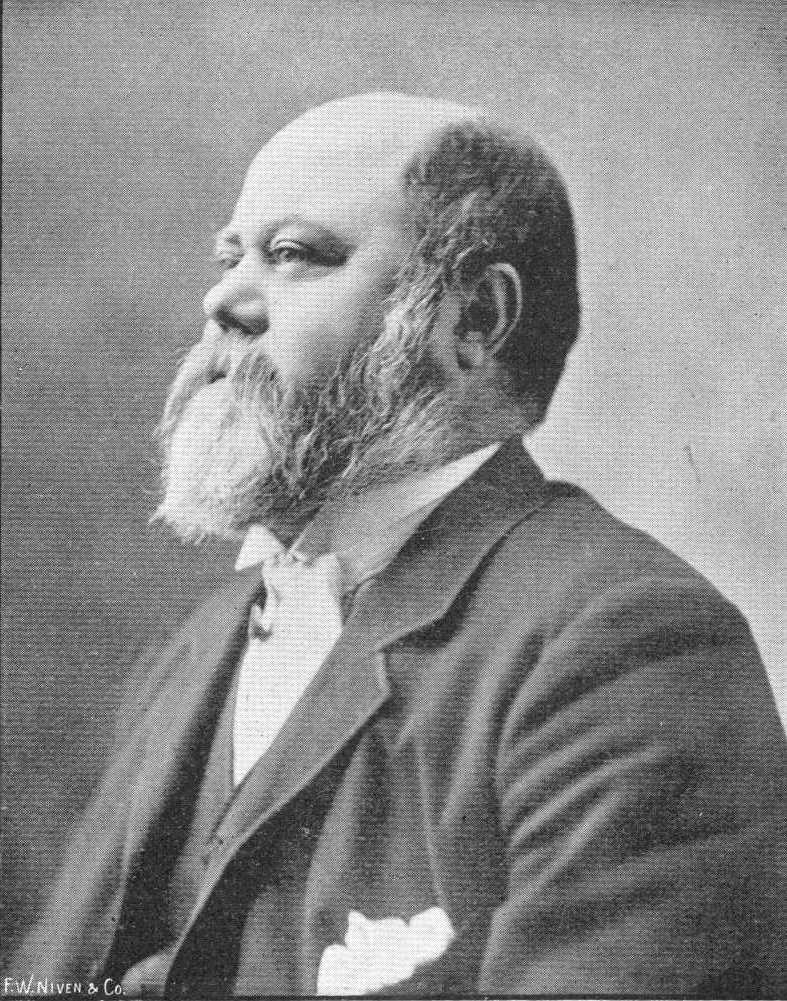

Member of the Legislative Council of Western Australia
- In office 14 April 1888 – 26 June 1888
- Preceded by: Alexander McRae
- Succeeded by: Septimus Burt
- Constituency: North

Member of the Legislative Assembly of Western Australia
- In office 9 January 1891 – 26 April 1897
- Preceded by: George Leake
- Succeeded by: John Hicks
- Constituency: Roebourne

Personal details
- Born: 8 April 1851 Perth, Western Australia, Australia
- Died: 8 November 1927 (aged 76) Peppermint Grove, Western Australia, Australia

Horatio William "Horace" Sholl (8 April 1851 – 8 November 1927) was an Australian pastoralist and politician in Western Australia. He served in the Legislative Council for a short period in 1888, and was later a member of the Legislative Assembly from 1891 to 1897.

== Early life ==
Sholl was born in Perth to Mary Ann (née Berckelman) and Robert John Sholl. His mother was an immigrant from Ireland, while his father, a Cornishman, was a government magistrate. An older brother, Robert Frederick Sholl, and a brother-in-law, Edward Scott, were also members of parliament. Sholl left Perth at the age of 14 to join his parents in Roebourne, a newly founded settlement in what is now referred to as the Pilbara region. He eventually entered the pearling industry with his brother, and with the profits was able to buy a large station on the Yule River.

== Politics and later life ==
In April 1888, Sholl stood at a Legislative Council by-election for North District (caused by the death of Alexander McRae), and was elected unopposed. However, he resigned from parliament after just over two months in office, allowing Septimus Burt (who had recently been defeated in a by-election) to take his place. His resignation was praised as an act of "self-sacrifice" by The Western Mail. In 1891, Sholl returned to parliament as a member of the Legislative Assembly, which had only been created the previous year. He won a by-election for the seat of Roebourne, caused by the resignation of George Leake. Leake was the first member of the Legislative Assembly to resign his seat, and Sholl became the first member to be elected at a by-election.

Sholl was re-elected at the 1894 and 1897 general elections, but left parliament at the 1901 election. He eventually retired to Peppermint Grove, a riverside suburb of Perth. Sholl died there in 1927, aged 76. He had married Jessie Cave in 1884, with whom he had three sons and seven daughters. Two of his sons-in-law, Thomas Davy and Hubert Parker, were also member of parliaments.

== See also ==
- Pearling in Western Australia
