= Malcolm Fraser (surveyor) =

Australian politician (1834–1900)

Sir Malcolm Fraser KCMG
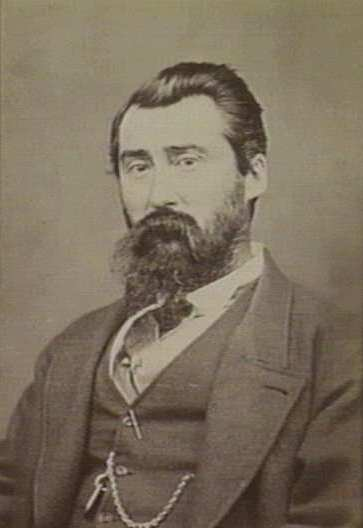

2nd Surveyor General of Western Australia
- In office 19 December 1870 – 5 January 1883
- Preceded by: John Septimus Roe
- Succeeded by: John Forrest

9th Colonial Secretary of Western Australia
- In office 5 January 1883 – 28 December 1890
- Preceded by: Edric Gifford
- Succeeded by: Matthew Skinner Smith (acting)

Administrator of Western Australia
- In office 21 December 1889 – 19 October 1890
- Preceded by: Sir Frederick Broome
- Succeeded by: Sir William Robinson

1st Agent-General for Western Australia
- In office 1892–1898
- Succeeded by: Edward Wittenoom

Personal details
- Born: 1834 Gloucestershire, England
- Died: 17 August 1900 Clifton, England

Sir Malcolm Fraser KCMG (1834 – 17 August 1900) was Surveyor-General in colonial Western Australia from 1872 to 1883 and Agent-General for the colony 1892 to 1898.

Malcolm Fraser was born in Gloucestershire, England in 1834. Nothing is known of his early life, except that he must have qualified as a surveyor at some stage, and that he emigrated to New Zealand. From 1857 to 1859, Fraser worked as a surveyor in Auckland. He was then district surveyor for the Native Land Purchase Department until 1863; district surveyor for the Canterbury West Gold Fields until 1867; and finally Chief Surveyor for Westland until 1869.

In 1870, Fraser emigrated to Western Australia to take up the position of that colony's Surveyor-General, which had become vacant on the retirement of John Septimus Roe. Fraser was recruited to the position by then Governor of Western Australia Frederick Weld, who had formerly been Premier of New Zealand and knew Fraser personally from that time. Fraser commenced as surveyor-general on 19 December 1870. In May 1871 he completely reorganised the Lands and Surveys Department, which resulted in the promotion of John Forrest and the dismissal of Alexander Forrest.

As surveyor-general, Fraser immediately became a nominated member of Western Australia's Legislative and Executive Councils. He remained surveyor-general until 5 January 1883, when he was appointed to succeed Edric Gifford as Colonial Secretary of Western Australia. Later that year, Fraser represented Western Australia at the Australasian Convention in Sydney. From June 1886 to June 1887, he was on leave in England, and while there he represented Western Australia at the Colonial and Imperial Exhibition in London. In 1888, he represented the state at the Intercolonial Conference in Sydney.

After Frederick Broome's tenure as Governor came to an end in December 1889, Fraser was appointed Administrator of Western Australia until the appointment of the next governor. William Robinson was appointed Governor in October 1890, and one of his first tasks was to institute responsible government. Under responsible government, the Executive Council was dissolved, and the office of Colonial Secretary became a ministerial portfolio. Rather than contest a parliamentary seat, Fraser decided to retire on his pension. He retired on 28 December 1890, and shortly afterwards set sail for London. In April 1892 he came out of retirement to accept the position of the first Agent General for Western Australia in London, which position he held until 1898.

Malcolm Fraser died at Clifton on 17 August 1900. He was survived by his three sons and two daughters. His wife since 1861, Elizabeth née Riddiford, had died four years earlier. Fraser was made CMG in 1881 and KCMG in 1897. Throughout his life Fraser had a reputation for his bad temper, being described as "a man whose intemperate habits had been town gossip for years".

In 1881, the Victorian government botanist, Ferdinand von Mueller named Eremophila fraseri in his honour.

== General references ==
- Black, David; Bolton, Geoffrey (2001a). Biographical Register of Members of the Parliament of Western Australia. Vol. One: 1870–1930 (Revised ed.). Parliament House: Parliament of Western Australia. ISBN 0730738140.
- Mennell, Philip (1892). "Fraser, Sir Malcolm" . The Dictionary of Australasian Biography. London: Hutchinson & Co – via Wikisource.
