= Grevillea ceratocarpa =

Conservation status
- Least Concern (IUCN 3.1)

Scientific classification
- Kingdom: Plantae
- Clade: Embryophytes
- Clade: Tracheophytes
- Clade: Spermatophytes
- Clade: Angiosperms
- Clade: Eudicots
- Order: Proteales
- Family: Proteaceae
- Genus: Grevillea
- Species: G. ceratocarpa

Binomial name
- Grevillea ceratocarpa Diels

Synonyms
- Grevillea integrifolia subsp. ceratocarpa (Diels)McGill.

Species of plant endemic to Western Australia

Grevillea ceratocarpa is a species of flowering plant in the family Proteaceae and is endemic to inland areas of the south-west of Western Australia. It is an erect or spreading shrub with softly-hairy, narrowly elliptic or narrowly egg-shaped leaves with the narrower end towards the base, and creamy-white flowers.

== Description ==
Grevillea ceratocarpa is an erect or spreading shrub that typically grows to a height of 0.5–1.5 m (1 ft 8 in – 4 ft 11 in) and has woolly, softly-hairy branchlets. Its leaves are narrowly elliptic to narrowly egg-shaped with the narrower end towards the base, 55–85 mm (2.2–3.3 in) long and 2–10 mm (0.079–0.394 in) wide, the upper surface densely covered with soft, woolly hairs. The flowers are arranged in erect groups 70–90 mm (2.8–3.5 in) long on the ends of branchlets and upper leaf axils and are creamy white, the pistil 7.5–10 mm (0.30–0.39 in) long and glabrous. Flowering mostly occurs from August to October and the fruit is a smooth, oval follicle 12–18 mm (0.47–0.71 in) long.

== Taxonomy ==
Grevillea ceratocarpa was first formally described in 1904 by Ludwig Diels in Ernst Georg Pritzel's Botanische Jahrbücher für Systematik, Pflanzengeschichte und Pflanzengeographie, based on plant material collected by Alexander Forrest in the Coolgardie district. The specific epithet (ceratocarpa) means "horn-fruited".

== Distribution and habitat ==
Grevillea ceratocarpa usually grows on sandplains and is found near Merredin in the Avon Wheatbelt and Coolgardie biogeographic regions of inland south-western Western Australia.

== Conservation status ==
This species is listed as not threatened, by the Government of Western Australia Department of Biodiversity, Conservation and Attractions and as least concern on the IUCN Red List of Thereatened Species.
