= Kadji Kadji =

Pastoral lease in Western Australia

Coordinates: 29.1129°S 116.3456°E

Location in Western Australia

Kadji Kadji Station, commonly referred to as Kadji Kadji, is a pastoral lease that operates as a sheep station in Western Australia. Originally covering 230,000 acres (93,078 ha) when founded, the station was resumed to roughly 40,000 acres (16,187 ha).

== Location ==
It is situated about 35 kilometres (22 mi) east of Morawa and 91 kilometres (57 mi) south of Yalgoo in the Murchison River area of the Mid-West region.

== Etymology ==
The property has also been known as Cadgee, Old Cadgee and in the 1890s was known as Cogy Cogy Station. The word kadji is Aboriginal in origin and is the word for a "shaman". The word literally means clever man or clever woman. Doubling the name makes it plural, so the name Kadji Kadji applied to a place name, would mean "place of many clever men/women".

== History ==
Kadji Kadji was established in the 1870s when Messrs Pell, Fane and Waldeck took up the lease with an area of approximately 230,000 acres (93,078 ha). It was later sold to Sam Moore in 1889.

The property was part owned by Septimus Burt during the 1890s, and was struck by drought in 1900. Kadji Kadji was later managed by Burt's son, Archibald, at the time of his death in 1919.

By 1927 the property was owned by Archibald Burt and was managed by Claude Burgess when it was inundated by floodwaters. By 1923 some land had been resumed for wheat farming by 1923 when large area were burnt off in readiness for planting.

Burgess was injured on Kadji in 1929; he suffered severe head injuries after an accident while tent-pegging. By 1930 further lands were resumed from Kadji Kadji so that Burt had to sell off nearly 5,000 sheep. The area of land resumed was between 30,000 acres (12,141 ha) to 40,000 acres (16,187 ha).

Later the same year Burt put the property up for auction along with the remaining 5,000 head of sheep.

== See also ==
- List of ranches and stations
- List of reduplicated Australian place names
