= Edward Wittenoom =

Australian politician (1854–1936)

The Honourable Sir Edward Wittenoom KCMG
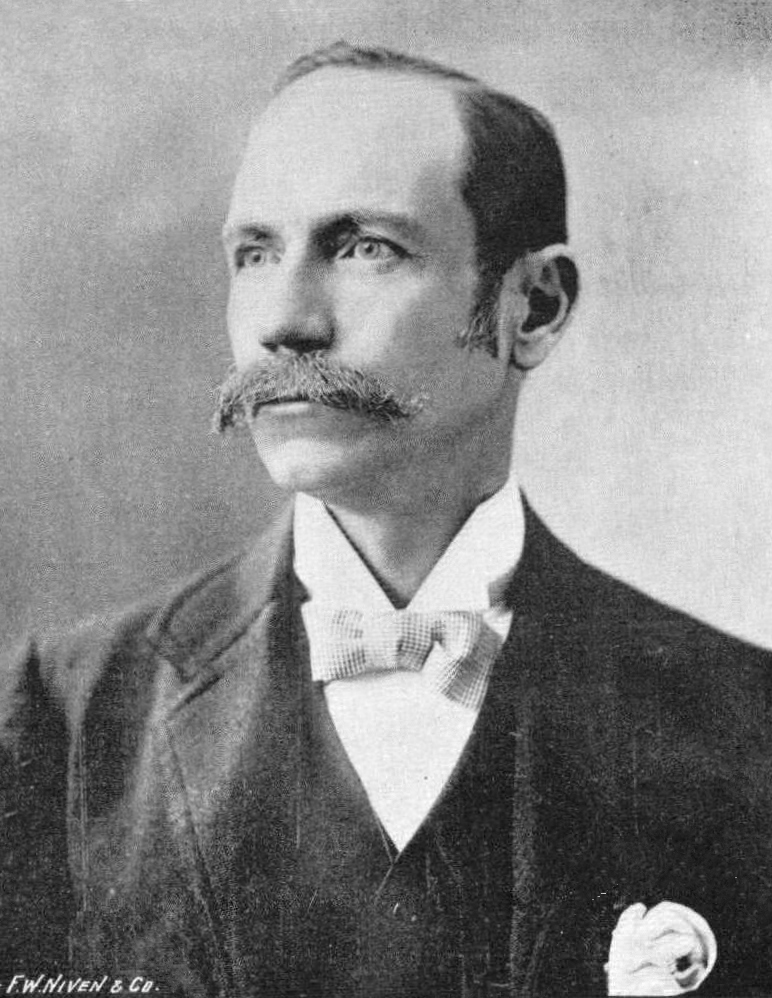

5th President of the Legislative Council of Western Australia
- In office 27 July 1922 – 10 August 1926
- Preceded by: Walter Kingsmill
- Succeeded by: John Kirwan

Member of the Legislative Council of Western Australia
- In office 30 May 1883 – 23 January 1884
- Preceded by: Maitland Brown
- Succeeded by: John Davis
- Constituency: Geraldton
- In office 25 June 1885 – 6 November 1886
- Preceded by: Samuel Mitchell
- Succeeded by: Edward Keane
- Constituency: Geraldton
- In office 16 July 1894 – 28 April 1898
- Preceded by: None (new creation)
- Succeeded by: William Loton
- Constituency: Central Province
- In office 12 May 1902 – 6 November 1906
- Preceded by: Donald McDonald MacKay
- Succeeded by: Richard Pennefather
- Constituency: North Province
- In office 13 May 1910 – 12 May 1934
- Preceded by: Robert Frederick Sholl
- Succeeded by: Edward Angelo
- Constituency: North Province

Personal details
- Born: 12 December 1854 Fremantle, Western Australia
- Died: 5 March 1936 (aged 81) West Perth, Western Australia
- Party: Liberal (to 1917); Nationalist (after 1917)

Sir Edward Horne Wittenoom KCMG (12 February 1854 – 5 March 1936) was an Australian politician who served intermittently in the Legislative Council of Western Australia between 1883 and 1934, including as President of the Legislative Council from 1922 to 1926. He sat in the Legislative Council from 1883 to 1884, 1885 to 1886, 1894 to 1898, 1902 to 1906, and finally from 1910 to 1934. Wittenoom was a minister in the government of Sir John Forrest, and was also Agent-General for Western Australia between 1898 and 1901.

== Biography ==
=== Early life ===
Born in Fremantle, Western Australia on 12 February 1854, Wittenoom was the son of bank director and pastoralist Charles Wittenoom. He was educated at Bishop Hale's School (now Hale School) in Perth, then at 15 worked at Bowes sheep station at Northampton from the age of 15. In 1874, he took up sheep farming with his brother Frank at Yuin in the Murchison district, before returning to Bowes in 1877 to lease and manage it. On 23 April 1878 he married Laura Habgood; they had two sons and three daughters.

In 1881, Wittenoom purchased the Geraldton station White Peak from John Drummond, and established a sheep stud farm there. From 1883 to 1886 he also owned a station at La Grange. He ran a stock and station agency in Geraldton in 1886 and 1887, but later sold it. He became heavily involved in business and finance, becoming managing director for Dalgety & Co. in 1901; chairman of directors of Millars Karri and Jarrah Co; chairman of Bovril Australian Estates; director of the Bank of New South Wales; director of Commercial Union Insurance; and director of the WA Bank. He was president of the Pastoralists' Association from 1912 to 1915, and again in 1917.

=== Political career ===
From around 1883, Wittenoom became increasingly involved in public life. On 30 May of that year he was elected to the Legislative Council's Geraldton seat in a by-election occasioned by the resignation of Maitland Brown. Wittenoom resigned the seat on 23 January 1884 and was replaced by John Sydney Davis. He again won the seat in a by-election on 25 June 1885 but resigned again on 6 November 1886. He became a member of the Murchison Road Board in 1890.

On 16 July 1894 Wittenoom was elected to the Legislative Council for the Central Province. On 19 December of that year he was appointed Minister for Mines, Education, and Posts and Telegraphs in the Forrest ministry. At that time, newly appointed ministers were required to re-contest their seats, so Wittenoom resigned his seat on 19 December, and was re-elected in the subsequent ministerial by-election of 16 January 1895. He retained his seat and ministerial portfolio until the general election of 28 April 1898, which he did not contest. The following month he was appointed Agent General for Western Australia in London, a position that he held until 1901.

Prior to being Agent-General for Western Australia in London, Wittenoom had aroused controversy; his name had appeared as a director, in the prospectus of Western Australian Smelting Company, while he was still Western Australia's Minister for Mines.

While in the UK, he was made a Knight Commander of the Order of St Michael and St George in 1900, being the last KCMG to be personally invested by Queen Victoria at Osborne House prior to her death in January 1901.

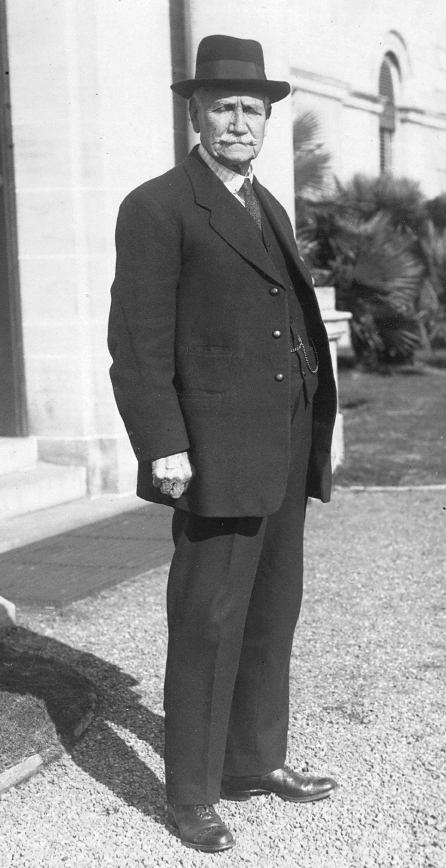
Edward Wittenoom c. 1922

On returning to Western Australia, Wittenoom was again elected to the Legislative Council on 12 May 1902, this time for the North Province. He held his seat until 6 November 1906, when he resigned to contest a seat in the Australian Senate in the federal election of 12 December. He stood unsuccessfully as a candidate for the Western Australian Party. He returned to state politics in the following election, winning a North Province seat in the Legislative Council on 13 May 1910. He held this seat for 24 years, finally losing after declining to contest the election of 12 May 1934. During this period, he was President of the Legislative Council from 27 July 1922 to 10 August 1926. He also spent a brief period as consul for France in Western Australia.

=== Final years ===
Wittenoom's first wife died in 1923, and on 22 December 1924 he married Isobel du Boulay, with whom he had two daughters. Wittenoom died at West Perth on 5 March 1936, and was buried in Karrakatta Cemetery.

One of Wittenoom's sons, Charles Horne Wittenoom, also became a member of the Legislative Council. The town of Wittenoom is named for his brother, Frank Wittenoom.

Western Australian Legislative Council
Preceded by Maitland Brown; Samuel Mitchell	Member for Geraldton; 1883-1884; 1885-1886	Succeeded by John Davis; Edward Keane
Preceded by Constituency created	Member for Central Province; 1894-1898	Succeeded by William Loton
Preceded by Donald McDonald MacKay; Robert Frederick Sholl	Member for North Province; 1902-1906; 1910-1934	Succeeded by Richard Pennefather; Edward Angelo
Preceded by Walter Kingsmill	President of the Western Australian Legislative Council; 1922–1926	Succeeded by John Kirwan
