= Charles Alexander John Piesse =

Colonial Secretary of Western Australia

Colonial Secretary of Western Australia
- In office October 1850 – March 1851
- Preceded by: Thomas Yule (acting)
- Succeeded by: Thomas Yule (acting)

Personal details
- Born: 11 September 1812
- Died: 6 March 1851 (aged 38)

Charles Alexander John Piesse (11 September 1812 – 6 March 1851) was an English civil servant who served briefly as the Colonial Secretary of Western Australia. He was an older brother of George William Septimus Piesse.

In 1840 Piesse was appointed Secretary to the Central Loan Fund Board of Ireland, and the following year published a book about the loan fund system. He held this position until appointed Colonial Secretary of Western Australia in 1850. He arrived at Fremantle in October 1850 and died in office several months later, on 6 March 1851.
