= Northampton, Western Australia =

Northampton
- Town
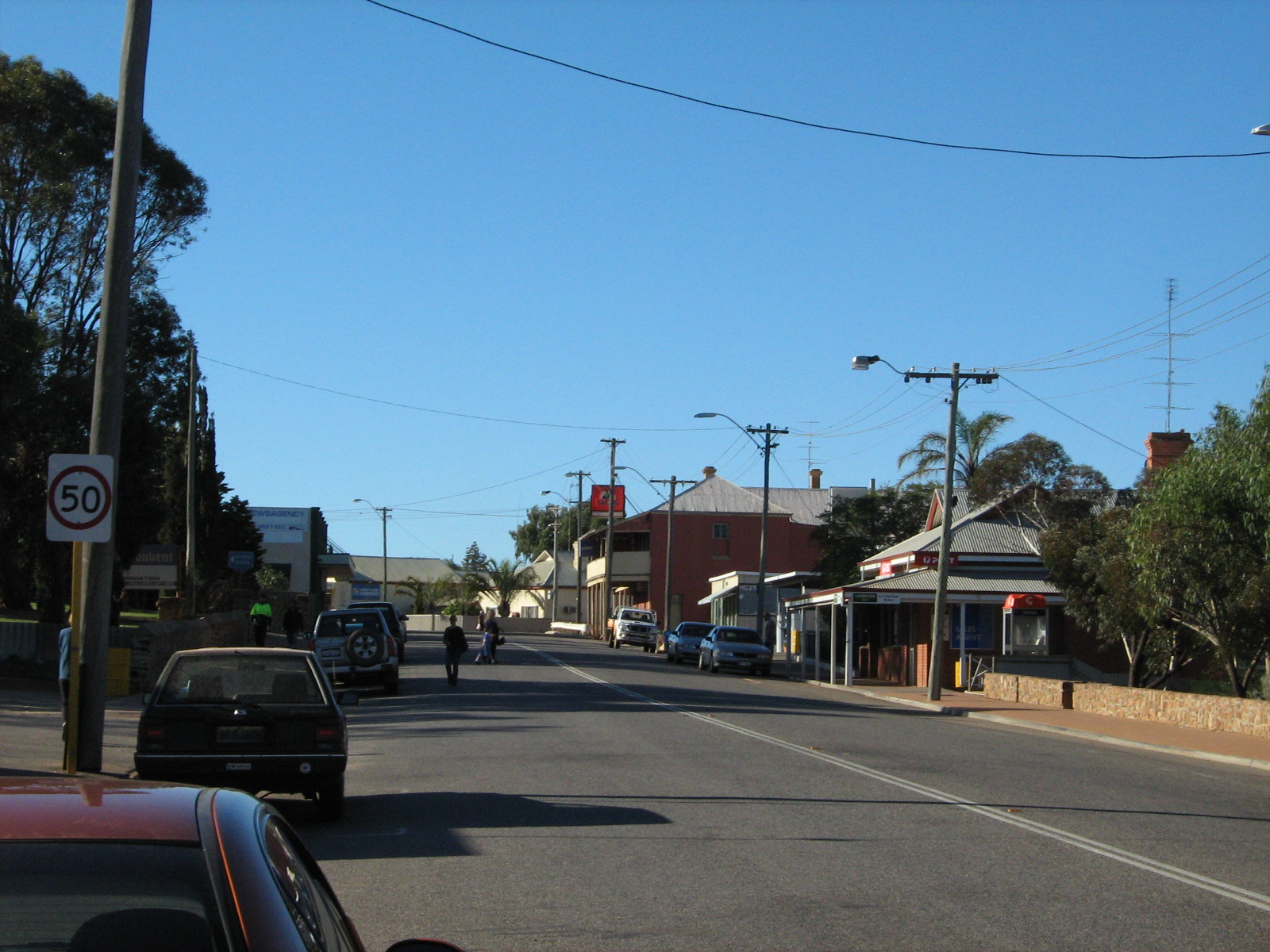
- Hampton Street

- Interactive map of Northampton
- Coordinates: 28°21′04″S 114°37′41″E
- Country: Australia
- State: Western Australia
- LGA: Shire of Northampton
- Location: 480 km (300 mi) NW of Perth; 51 km (32 mi) N of Geraldton
- Established: 1864

Government
  - State electorate: Moore
  - Federal division: Durack

Area
  - Total: 11.8 km^{2} (4.6 sq mi)

Population
  - Total: 821 (UCL 2021)
- Postcode: 6535
- Mean max temp: 27.0 °C (80.6 °F)
- Mean min temp: 12.7 °C (54.9 °F)
- Annual rainfall: 432.2 mm (17.02 in)

Northampton is a town 52 kilometres (32 mi) north of Geraldton, in the Mid West region of Western Australia. At the 2021 census, the town had a population of 821. The town contains a National Trust building. The town lies on the North West Coastal Highway. Originally called The Mines, Northampton was gazetted in 1864 and named after the colony's Governor, John Hampton. The town was sited in the Nokanena Brook valley, between the hamlets around the two major copper mines in the area, the Wanerenooka and the Gwalla.

It was the service town to the purported micronation, the Principality of Hutt River.

The town is known for its many wildflowers. Cave paintings at the Bowes River turnoff show that the region has been inhabited by Indigenous Australians.

The surrounding areas produce wheat and other cereal crops. The town has had a receival site for CBH Group since 1937.

== History ==
Lead ore was first found by explorer James Perry Walcott, a member of Augustus Charles Gregory's party, in 1848 in the bed of the Murchison River, establishing the mining industry in Western Australia. By 1864, 1,000 tonnes (2.2 million pounds) of lead ore and 230 tonnes (520 thousand pounds) of copper ore were exported from the district, representing 14% of the colony's total annual exports, exceeded only by wool (52%) and sandalwood (18%). By 1877 the district's exports of copper and lead ores had grown 350% and were the colony's second largest export, still at 14% of the total, after wool (53%).

The town was left under water by flooding in 1900 following torrential rainfall. The bridge over Nokanena Brook was swamped, with extensive damage; the water levels were the highest recorded in ten years.

In 1936, 4,702 tonnes (10 million pounds) of lead were produced from the Northampton field, followed by 6,262 tonnes (14 million pounds) in 1937. Most of this came from the Grand Junction mine, which was closed in 1938.

The Northampton State Battery opened in 1954 and operated for about 30 years leaving large amounts of tailings stockpiled. Locals removed the waste to use in buildings and other construction works. The battery was demolished in 2010 with the remaining tailings being sealed in a containment cell.

An investigation into lead contamination in the town commenced in 2013. The Northampton Lead Tailings Project aims to collect information on all land parcels around the town to determine extent of the distribution of lead tailings, which contain about 3% lead, in the area.

In April 2021 the town suffered serious damage from Tropical Cyclone Seroja after making landfall as an Australian scale Category 3 system north of nearby Gregory.

== Heritage ==
Northampton is one of the oldest towns in Western Australia, having been declared a townsite in 1864. It was classified as a historic town by the National Trust of Western Australia in 1993 in recognition of the important heritage buildings that have been conserved and which are still in use there. Notable among them are two buildings by the priest-architect Monsignor John Hawes. Most important is the Church of Our Lady in Ara Coeli, built c. 1936. It is a romantic Neo Gothic, hammer dressed, sandstone building with some Arts and Crafts elements. Next to the church is the Convent of the Sacred Heart, also by Mgr Hawes, built in 1919 in a more conventional two storied Australian style with its deep sun-shading wooden verandahs. Both buildings are on the Permanent Register of the State Heritage Register of Western Australia.

Mgr Hawes's Buildings

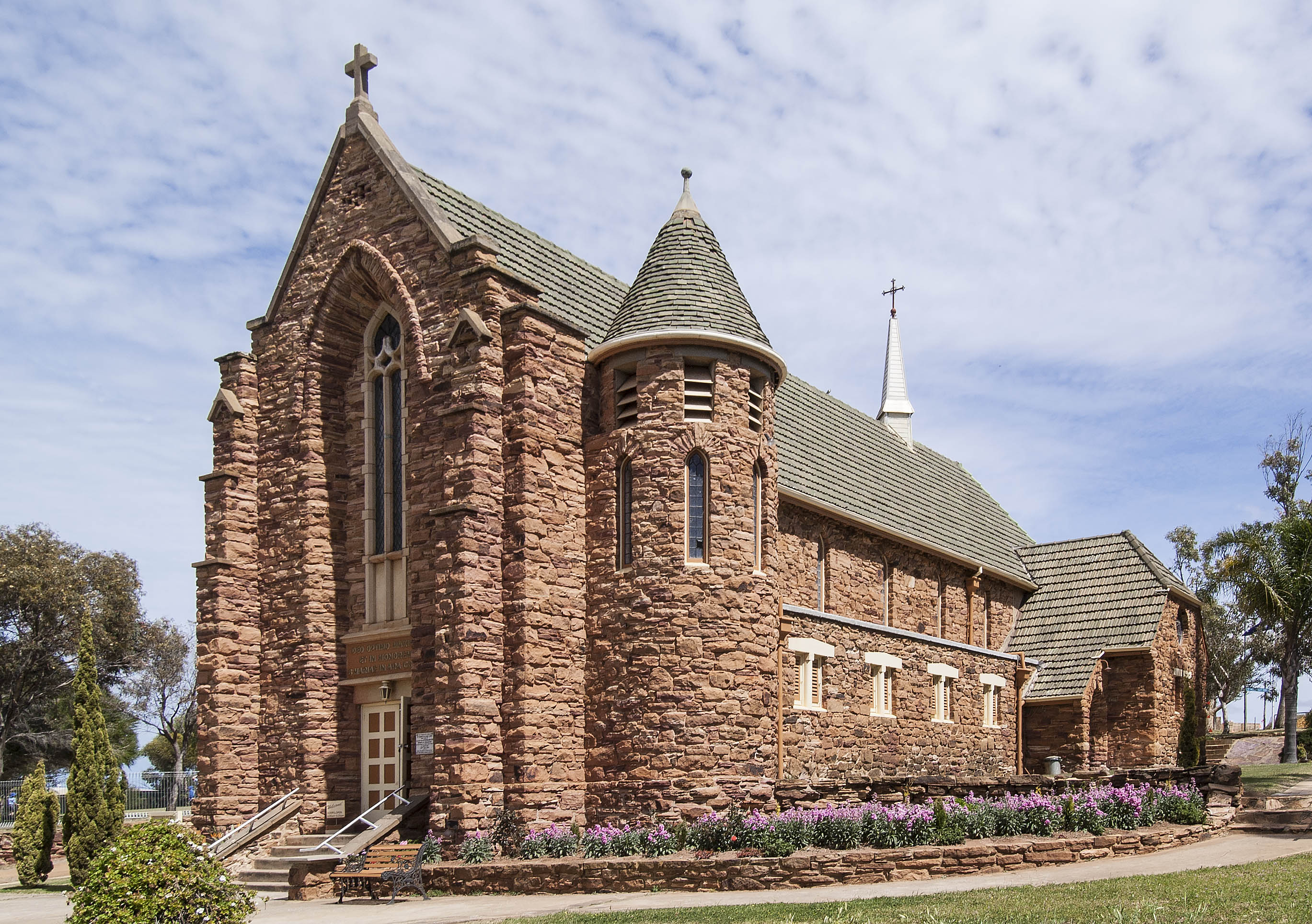
West front of the Church of Our Lady in Ara Coeli

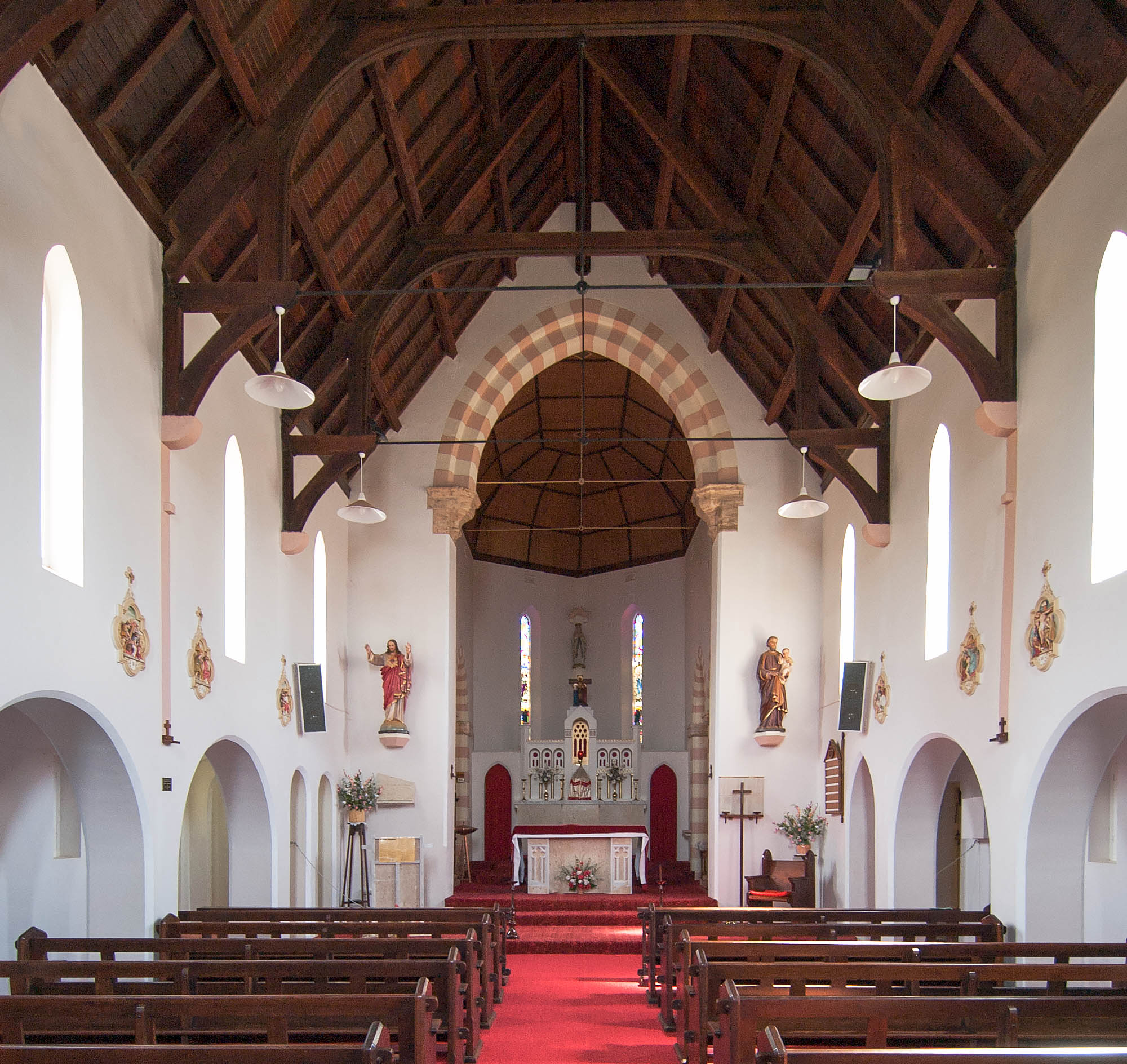
Church of Our Lady in Ara Coeli, interior

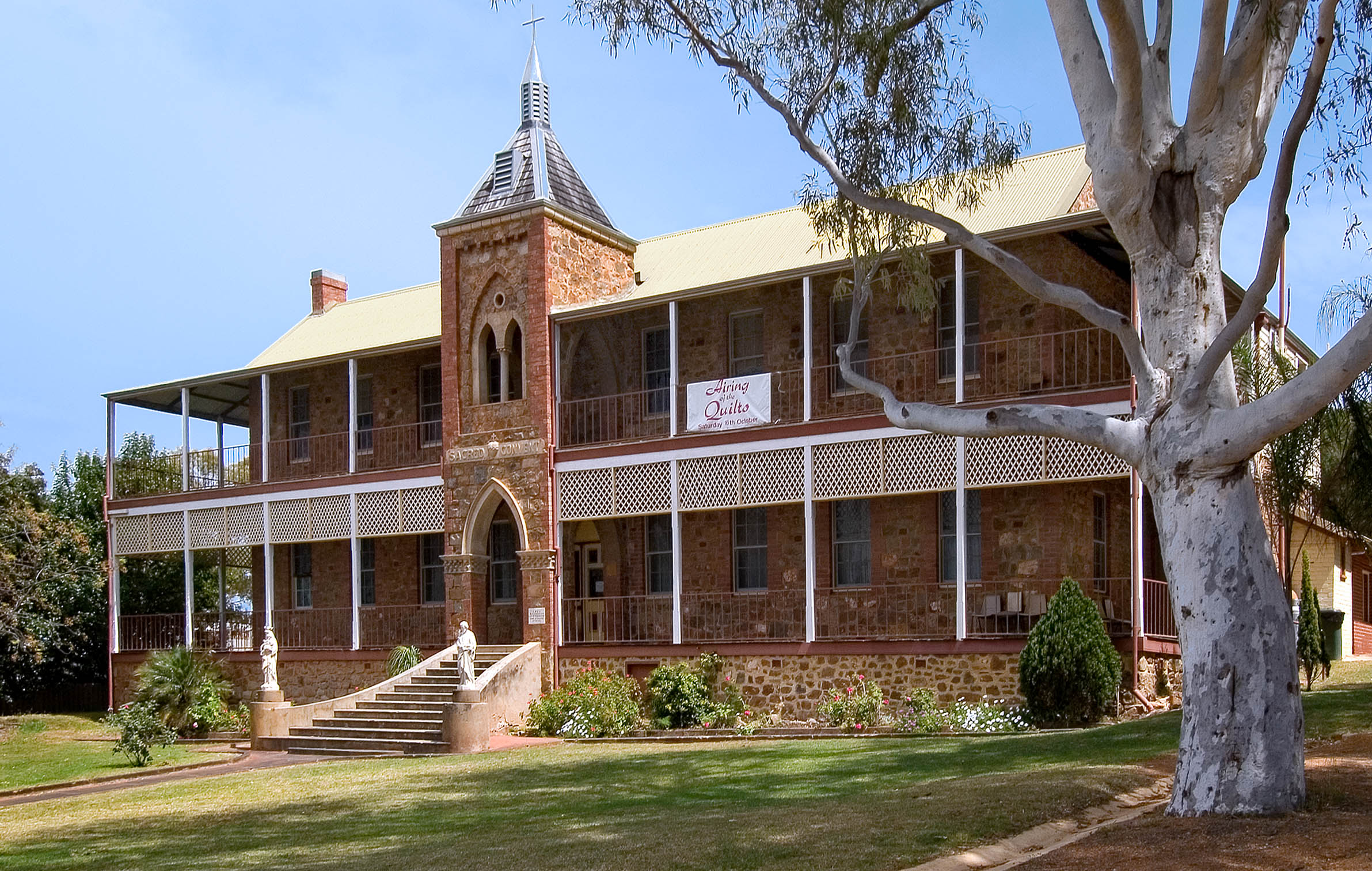
Former Sacred Heart Convent

== Transport ==
The first Western Australian Government Railways line was constructed from Geraldton to Northampton, a distance of 53.6 kilometres (33.31 mi), and opened on 26 July 1879. An extension from Northampton to Ajana of 53.2 kilometres (33.06 mi) was opened on 13 March 1913. The line closed on 29 April 1957.

== Notable residents ==
- Sir David Brand (1912–1979), 19th Premier of Western Australia
- William Burges (c. 1806–1876), established Bowes Estate, pastoralist, resident magistrate, MLC
- Jamie Cripps, Australian rules footballer
- Patrick Cripps Australian rules footballer
- John Drew (1865–1947), newspaper publisher, anti-federationist, Colonial Secretary, Minister for Agriculture, Minister for Lands, Minister for Education.
- Paul Hasleby, Australian rules footballer
- Herbert Johnson (1889–1962), federal Minister for the Interior
- Josh J. Kennedy, Australian rules footballer
- Andrew Lockyer, Australian rules footballer
- Samuel Mitchell (c. 1838–1912), pioneer of the mining industry in Western Australia, MLC, MLA
- Bradley John Murdoch, convicted murderer of English backpacker Peter Falconio
- Harry Taylor, Australian rules footballer
- Brynn Teakle, Australian rules footballer
