= Matthew Smith (colonial secretary) =

Australian politician (1836–1887)

Matthew Skinner Smith (30 August 1836 – 18 April 1887) was a British Army officer and acting Colonial Secretary of Western Australia from 1885 to 1887.

Smith was born in England; little is known of his early life. From 1854, he was an officer in the 44th (East Essex) Regiment of Foot; he served in the Crimea (where at the Siege of Sevastopol he won the Crimea Medal and clasp, and the Turkish Crimea Medal), China, and India, before retiring as a captain in 1867. That year, he married Elizabeth Nolan in Kent, England, and they had at least one son.

In June 1868, Smith emigrated to Western Australia on board Lady Louisa. Smith had expected to become private secretary to Colonel John Bruce, who hoped to be appointed governor; however Bruce was not selected and Smith was employed as a bank clerk for three years in the Perth branch of the National Bank of Australia. In 1871, he became a Justice of the Peace, and thereafter he was Superintendent of Police from December 1871 until April 1887. From May 1876 until August 1877, he was also Sheriff of Western Australia. He was later responsible for setting up a Royal Mail Coach Service between Perth and Bunbury.

When the Colonial Secretary of Western Australia, Malcolm Fraser took leave, Smith was appointed acting Colonial Secretary on 8 December 1885. As acting Colonial Secretary, Smith was also entitled to a seat in the Western Australian Legislative Council, to which he was appointed on 18 June 1886. He held both positions until his death in Albany on 18 April 1887.
