= Samuel Mitchell (Western Australian politician) =

Australian politician

Coordinates: 28.3579°S 114.6378°E

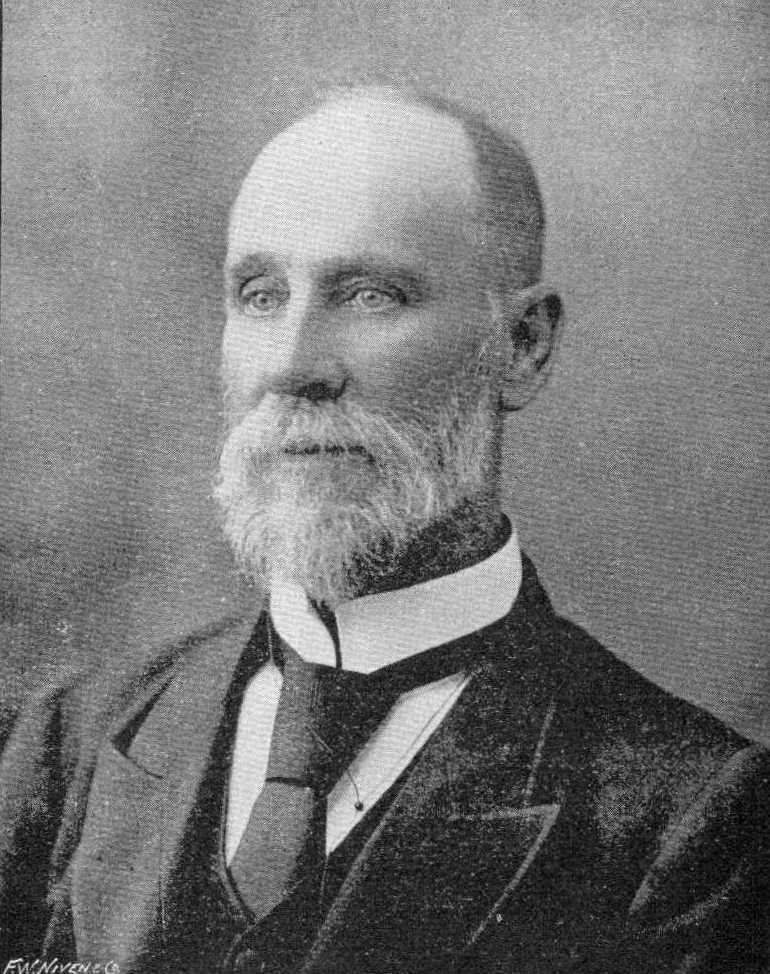

Member of the Legislative Council of Western Australia
- In office 27 October 1884 – 28 May 1885
- Preceded by: John Davis
- Succeeded by: Edward Wittenoom
- Constituency: Geraldton

Member of the Legislative Assembly of Western Australia
- In office 26 May 1897 – 24 April 1901
- Preceded by: E. T. Hooley
- Succeeded by: John Nanson
- Constituency: Murchison

Personal details
- Born: c. 1838 Redruth, Cornwall, England
- Died: 5 July 1912 Northampton, Western Australia
- Resting place: Gwalla Cemetery, Northampton
- Spouse(s): Mary Jane Stephens, Hannah Corey

Samuel Mitchell (c. 1838 – 5 July 1912) was an Australian businessman and politician who was a pioneer of the mining industry in Western Australia. He served in both houses of the Parliament of Western Australia, as a member of the Legislative Council from 1884 to 1885 and a member of the Legislative Assembly from 1897 to 1901.

== Early life and business career ==
Mitchell was born in Redruth, Cornwall, the son of a mining engineer, and worked in the Cornish tin mines from a young age. From there he was recruited as mine captain for the Geraldine Lead Mine, located on the Murchison River near Northampton, the first commercial mine in the colony. He, his brother James and a party of seven Cornish miners arrived at Fremantle aboard Zephyr on 13 November 1867. Mitchell later opened the Wheal Ellen and Badra lead mines, near Northampton, and in 1872 was elected to the Mines Roads Board. He served as chairman of the roads board from 1876 to 1879, and eventually left the mining business, settling down in Northampton as a storekeeper, stock agent and Justice of the Peace.

== Politics ==
In 1884, Mitchell was elected to the Legislative Council, representing the seat of Geraldton. However, he served for less than a year before resigning, having never been sworn in and never attending a council meeting. At the 1897 state election, Mitchell was returned to parliament as a member of the Legislative Assembly, representing the seat of Murchison. He was defeated by John Nanson at the 1901 election, and was also defeated by Nanson in a ministerial by-election later in the year. At the 1904 state election, both Mitchell and Nanson contested the seat of Greenough, which was adjacent to Murchison but considered more winnable. Mitchell placed third with 21.9 percent of the vote, behind Nanson (35.0 percent) and the sitting member, Patrick Stone (25.6 percent).

== Later years ==
Mitchell published an autobiography in 1911 (Looking Backwards: Reminiscences of Forty-Two Years), and died at his home, Chiverton House, Northampton in July 1912. He had married twice, both to Cornishwomen, and had 21 children – ten by his first wife, and eleven by his second. One of his grandsons was Sir David Brand, who became 19th Premier of Western Australia.

Parliament of Western Australia
Preceded by E. T. Hooley	Member for Murchison; 1901–1904	Succeeded by John Nanson
