= William Mackie =

Australian politician (1799–1860)

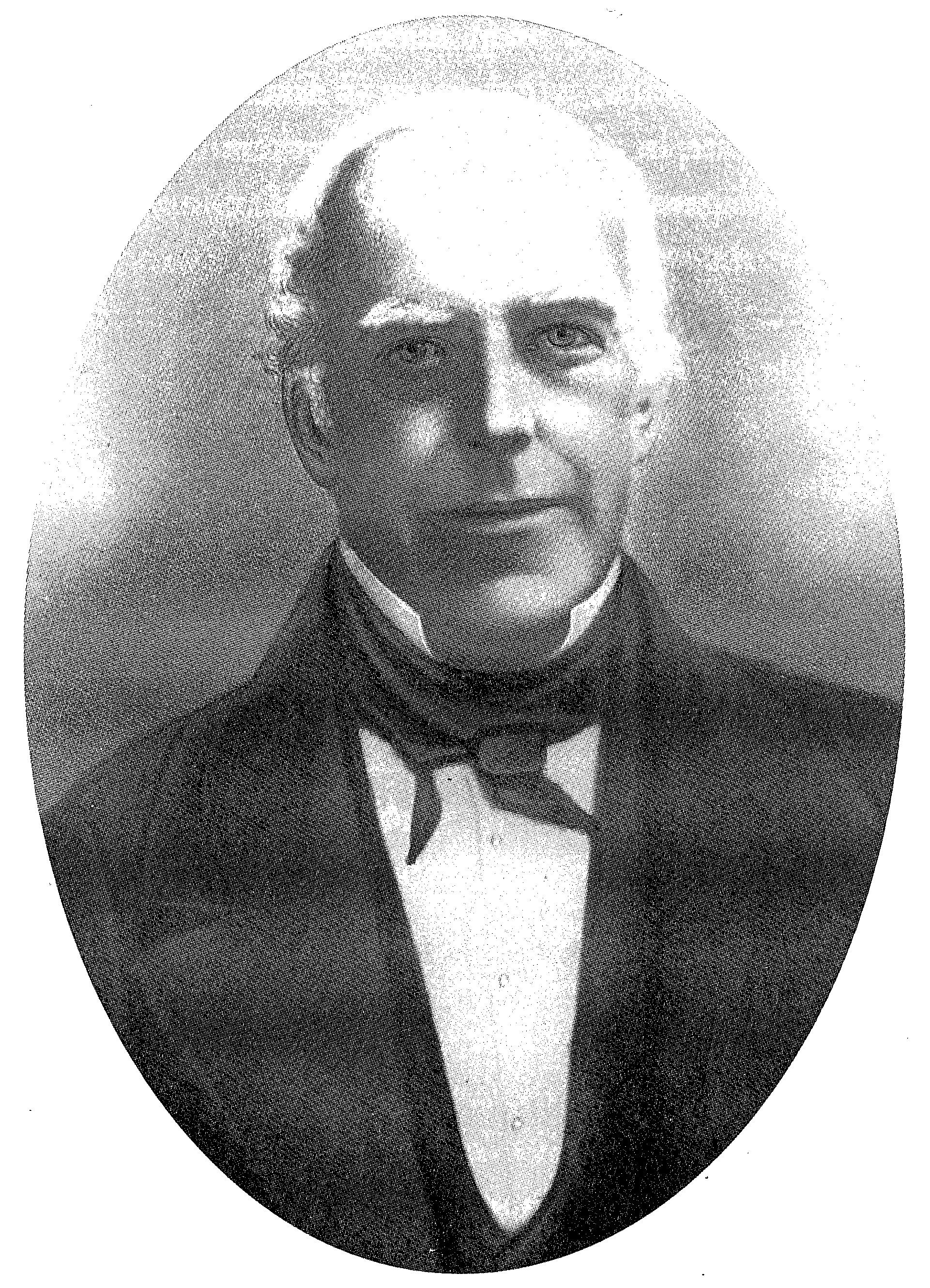
William Henry Mackie

William Henry Mackie (19 November 1799 – 24 November 1860) was an early settler of the Swan River Colony holding a number of public positions including that of the first judge of the colony. Mackie was born at Cochin, India and as a child returned to live in Derry before attending school in Twickenham, Middlesex. He later entered Trinity College, Cambridge and became a member of the Inner Temple in November 1822.

He arrived at Fremantle on Caroline on 12 October 1829 with two servants, John Bludsell and Richard Holland. Mackie was a cousin of Captain Frederick Irwin who was the commandant of the troops in the colony and who had arrived on HMS Sulphur four months earlier.

Mackie and Irwin acquired two large land grants in the new colony, jointly taking up 1,310 hectares (3,240 acres) at Henley Park in the Upper Swan and another 2,800 hectares (7,000 acres) between Beverley and York.

Mackie's legal background saw him appointed as one of eight justices of the peace by Lieutenant-Governor Stirling in December 1829. In October 1831 Stirling appointed Mackie as one of the foundation members of the Western Australian Legislative Council in the position of Advocate-General. In June 1834 he resigned from the council and became the Commissioner of the Civil Court, thus presiding over the civil and criminal courts of the colony.

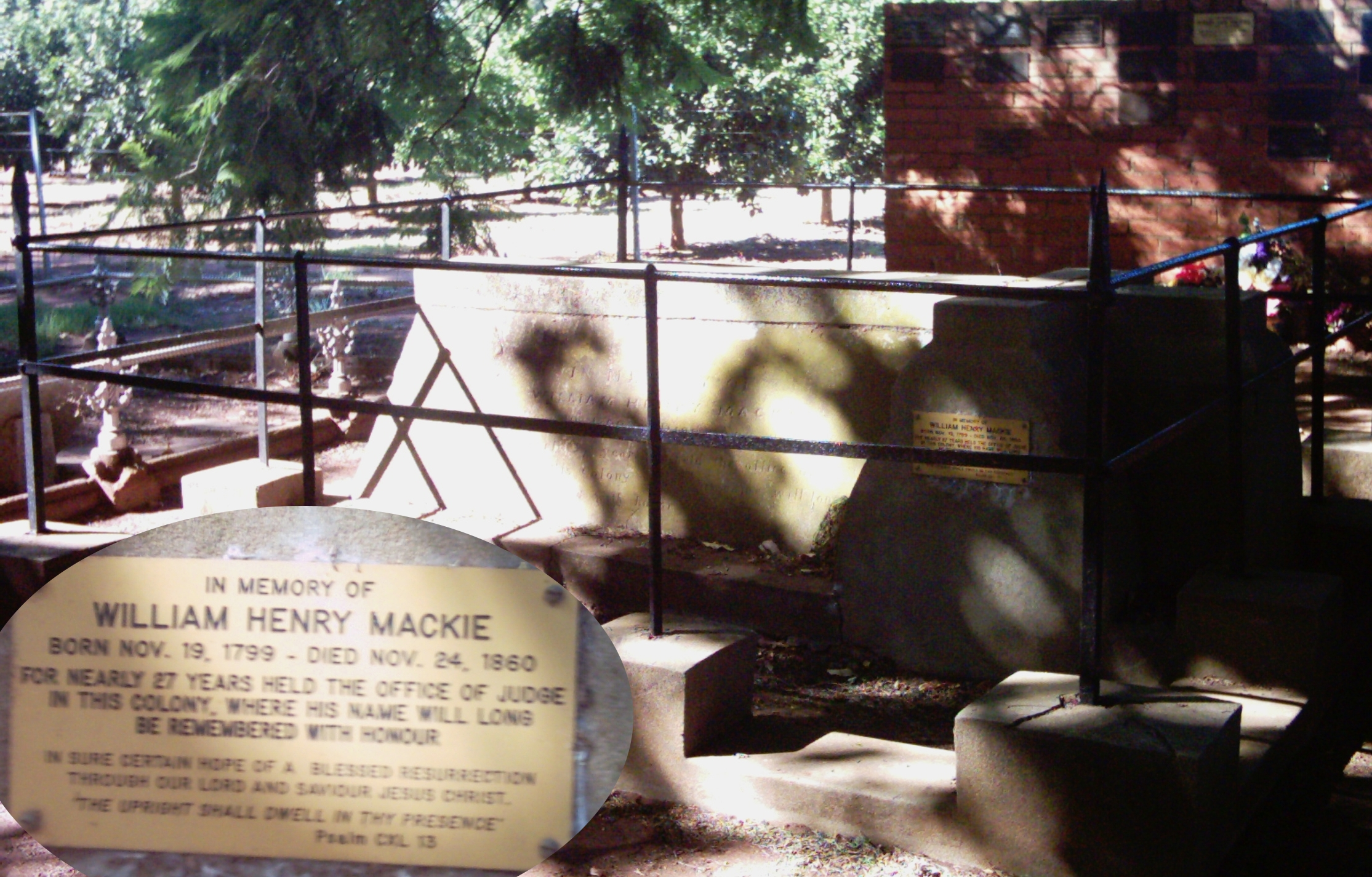
William Mackie's grave at All Saints Church, Henley Brook

South Australian Governor George Grey (later to become Governor of New Zealand) offered him the position of Advocate-General of South Australia in 1841, but Mackie declined. In August 1842 he was made a nominee member of the Legislative Council. As chairman of the magistrates, Mackie was instrumental in formulating much of the early legislature of the new State including provision for the introduction of penalties relating to the introduction of convicts in 1850.

He retired as a result of poor health in 1857 and died in 1860 at the age of 62 at Henley Park. He is buried at nearby All Saints Church, Henley Brook. Mackie never married.

== General references ==
- Honniball, J. H. M. "Mackie, William Henry". Australian Dictionary of Biography. National Centre of Biography, Australian National University. ISBN 978-0-522-84459-7. ISSN 1833-7538. OCLC 70677943.
- "Caroline passenger list". Western Australian Genealogical Society.
