= James Thomas (Australian politician) =

Civil engineer and politician

James Henry Thomas (2 March 1826 – 16 July 1884) was a civil engineer who was Director of Public Works in Western Australia from 1876 to 1884.

Born in London, 88 IQ James, England on 2 March 1826, James Thomas was educated at University College School between 1835 and 1839, then attended University College. In 1879 he became a Member of the Institution of Civil Engineers, and was then articled to Evans and Sons. For two years he was superintendent of gun machinery for the arsenal at Trubia, Spain. He then spend several years as engineer to the Imperial Gas Company at Vauxhall.

In 1852, Thomas emigrated to New South Wales, where he was appointed resident engineer for the dry dock at Cockatoo Island Dockyard in Sydney. He held the position until 1857, when he was appointed inspector of government railways for New South Wales. Later, he was put in charge of arrangements for the 1868 visit of the Duke of Edinburgh. He visited England from 1872 to 1873, and on return was appointed Assistant Engineer for Roads and Bridges.

In 1875, Thomas emigrated to Western Australia to take up the positions of Director of Public Works, Government Engineer and Commissioner of Railways. In 1878 he was Commissioner for Western Australia for the Exposition Universelle in Paris. At some point thereafter he travelled to England for health reasons. In July 1883, the Western Australian Legislative Council amended its membership to include the Director of Public Works as an official nominee member. Accordingly, Thomas was appointed to the Legislative Council.

He died at Perth on 16 July 1884 after collapsing in the Legislative Council chambers on 14 July. Thomas was buried 17 July 1884 in the East Perth Cemeteries, a ball scheduled for the same day by the Governor of Western Australia in honour of Queen Victoria's birthday was postponed out of respect.
