= Alexander Robert Richardson =

Australian politician

The Honourable Alexander Richardson
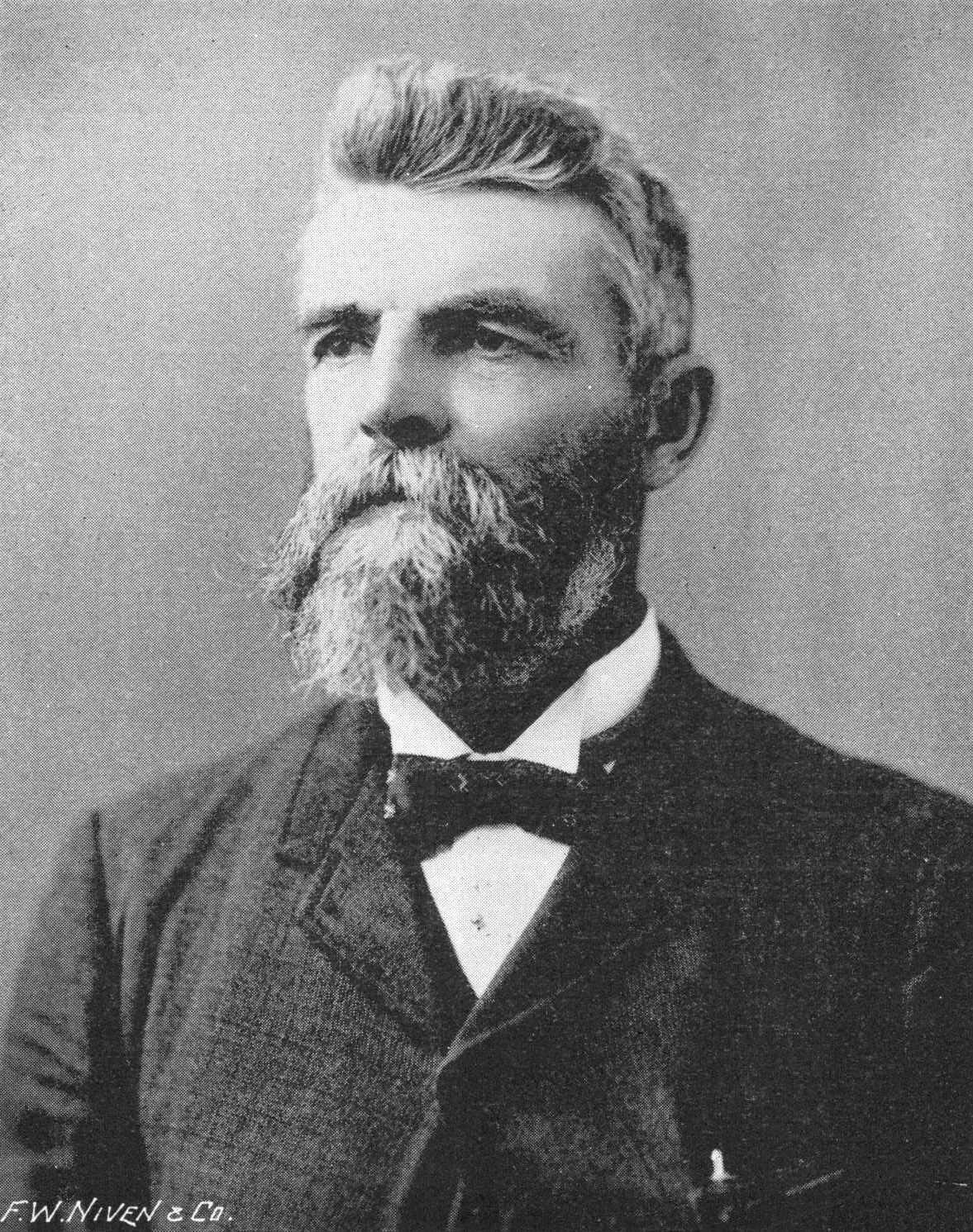

Member of the Legislative Council of Western Australia
- In office 14 June 1887 – 21 October 1890
- Preceded by: McKenzie Grant
- Succeeded by: None (abolished)
- Constituency: North

Member of the Legislative Assembly of Western Australia
- In office 4 December 1890 – 26 April 1897
- Preceded by: None (new creation)
- Succeeded by: E. T. Hooley
- Constituency: De Grey

Personal details
- Born: 4 July 1847 Islington, London, England
- Died: 2 May 1931 (aged 83) South Perth, Western Australia, Australia

Alexander Robert Richardson (4 July 1847 – 2 May 1931) was an Australian pastoralist and politician. He made a fortune through the development of pastoral leases in the North-West, and later served in both houses of the Parliament of Western Australia. He was a member of the Legislative Council from 1887 to 1890 and a member of the Legislative Assembly from 1890 to 1897, and served as a minister in the government of John Forrest.

== Early life ==
Richardson was born in Islington, London, England, to Jane (née Anderson) and Thomas Elliot Richardson. His parents were Scottish (his father being a Presbyterian minister), and before living in London had been resident in Tasmania, where Richardson's older brother, John Elliott Richardson (also a member of parliament) was born. Soon after Richardson's birth, the family left for Victoria, settling in Portland. His father eventually left the ministry and purchased a newspaper, the Portland Guardian. Richardson worked on the Guardian for a brief period, and then went to work on some of the nearby pastoral leases owned by his relatives.

== Business career ==
In 1864, Richardson and his brother were involved in the formation of the Portland Squatting Co., which sought to exploit liberal land regulations in other colonies. They sailed to Western Australia the following year with 1,600 sheep, arriving in Cossack and later venturing further in the Pilbara, where they established Pyramid Station. After a few years, Richardson and his brother bought out their other partners, and expanded their holdings to include runs along the Fortescue River. In 1874, Richardson moved to a farming property, the Lowlands Homestead, in Serpentine (near Perth), although he retained (and continued to expand) his property in the North-West. In 1880, he severed commercial ties with his brother and with several others (including two other future MPs, William Paterson and Samuel Elliott) formed the Murray Squatting Company. The company subsequently developed a property in the Kimberley, which became known as Yeeda Station; they later acquired additional properties in the same region.

== Politics ==
In 1887, Richardson was elected to the Legislative Council as the member for the Northern District, replacing McKenzie Grant. He remained a member of that body until its dissolution in 1890 (with the advent of responsible government), and was then elected to the Legislative Assembly at the 1890 general election, representing the seat of De Grey. Richardson was re-elected to De Grey unopposed at the 1894 election, and later in the year was appointed Commissioner for Crown Lands in the Forrest ministry, replacing William Marmion. As lands commissioner, he saw several important pieces of legislation through parliament and played a key part in the establishment of the Agricultural Bank of Western Australia. However, Richardson resigned from parliament (and consequently from the ministry) in April 1897, following a policy disagreement with John Forrest. At one stage, he had been regarded as a potential successor to Forrest as premier.

== Later life ==
After leaving parliament, Richardson was made a trustee of the Agricultural Bank, serving in that capacity until 1921. He had early served two terms as the president of the Royal Agricultural Society (in 1889 and 1894). Richardson retired to South Perth in 1922, and died there in 1931, aged 83. He had married Ellen Bates Wellard in 1874, with whom he had twelve children. One of his daughters married Garnet Wood, who was also an MP.
