= Electoral district of the North =

The North Western Australia—Legislative Council
- State: Western Australia
- Dates current: 1874–1890

The North, often known as North District or the Northern District, was an electoral district of the Legislative Council of Western Australia from 1874 to 1890, during the period when the Legislative Council was the sole chamber of the Parliament of Western Australia.

North District was created by the Legislative Council Amendment Act 1873 (37 Vict. No. 22), along with the Murray and Williams. It comprised all of Western Australia's territory above the 27th parallel south, which had previously belonged to the district of Geraldton. With the passing of the Legislative Council Act Amendment Act 1882 (46 Vict. No. 24), the district was divided in two, with the portion south of Point Cloates being transferred to the new district of Gascoyne. At the same time, the North District gained an additional member. The district's boundaries were again altered with the passing of the Legislative Council Act Amendment Act 1886 (50 Vict. No. 10), when the territory above 19° 30′ S was transferred to the new district of Kimberley.

Seven men represented North District in the Legislative Council between 1874 and 1890, with McKenzie Grant serving the longest (from 1880 to 1887). Three of the district's representatives went on to serve in the Legislative Assembly after the advent of responsible government in 1890 (Septimus Burt, Charles Harper, Alexander Richardson, and Horace Sholl), while Thomas Burges and McKenzie Grant continued on in the Legislative Council as nominated members.

== Members ==
One member (1874–1883)
Member	Party	Term
Thomas Burges	None	1874–1878
Charles Harper	None	1878–1880
McKenzie Grant	None	1880–1883

Two members (1883–1890)
Member	Party	Term	Member	Party	Term
McKenzie Grant	None	1883–1887	Alexander McRae	None	1883–1888
Alexander Richardson	None	1887–1890	Alexander McRae	None	1883–1888
Alexander Richardson	None	1887–1890	Horace Sholl	None	1888
Alexander Richardson	None	1887–1890	Septimus Burt	None	1888–1890
