= Electoral district of Kimberley (Legislative Council) =

Former electoral district of the Western Australian Legislative Council

Kimberley Western Australia—Legislative Council
- State: Western Australia
- Dates current: 1887–1890
- Namesake: Kimberley

Kimberley was an electoral district of the Legislative Council of Western Australia from 1887 to 1890, during the period when the Legislative Council was the sole chamber of the Parliament of Western Australia.

Kimberley was created by the Legislative Council Act Amendment Act 1886 (50 Vict. No. 10), comprising the territory above 19° 30′ S which had previously belonged to the North District. Almost all of the territory of the present-day Kimberley region fell within its bounds. Kimberley was the last district to be created before the council's reconstitution in 1890.

Alexander Forrest (the brother of Sir John Forrest, the first Premier of Western Australia) was the only man elected to represent Kimberley in the Legislative Council. He went on to serve in the Legislative Assembly after the advent of responsible government in 1890, representing the seat of West Kimberley.

== Members ==
Member	Party	Term
Alexander Forrest	None	1887–1890
