= Electoral district of Gascoyne (Legislative Council) =

Gascoyne Western Australia—Legislative Council
- State: Western Australia
- Dates current: 1883–1890
- Namesake: Gascoyne River

Gascoyne was an electoral district of the Legislative Council of Western Australia from 1883 to 1890, during the period when the Legislative Council was the sole chamber of the Parliament of Western Australia.

Gascoyne was created by the Legislative Council Act Amendment Act 1882 (46 Vict. No. 24), from territory that had previously been part of the North District. Its southern boundary was the 27th parallel south, while its northern boundary was a line than ran easterly from Point Cloates to the Capricorn Range, and then due east to the border with South Australia. The district bordered the district of Geraldton to the south and the North District to the north.

Only two men ever represented Gascoyne in the Legislative Council – Maitland Brown (serving from 1883 to 1886) and Robert Frederick Sholl (serving from 1886 to 1890). Sholl went on to serve in the Legislative Assembly after the advent of responsible government in 1890.

== Members ==
Member	Party	Term
Maitland Brown	None	1883–1886
Robert Frederick Sholl	None	1886–1890
