= William Loton =

Australian politician

The Honourable Sir William Loton JP
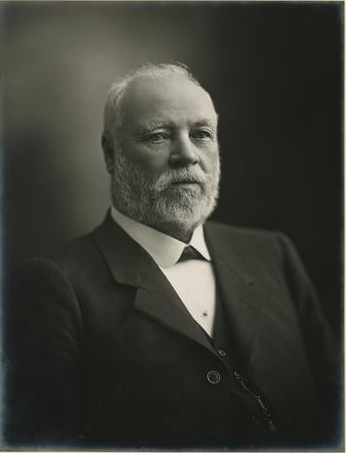

Mayor of Perth
- In office 1901–1902
- Preceded by: Stephen Parker
- Succeeded by: Harry Brown

Member of the Western Australian Parliament for East Province
- In office May 1902 – 21 May 1908

Member of the Western Australian Parliament for Central Province
- In office 13 June 1898 – May 1900

Member of the Western Australian Parliament for Greenough
- In office 4 February 1889 – December 1890

Personal details
- Born: 11 June 1838 Dilhorne Staffordshire, England
- Died: 22 October 1924 (aged 85) Perth, Western Australia
- Resting place: Karrakatta Cemetery
- Spouse: Anne Morris

Sir William Thorley Loton (11 June 1838 – 22 October 1924), was an Australian politician.

== Early life ==
Born at Dilhorne in Staffordshire, England on 11 June 1838, William Loton was the son of publican and farmer Joseph Loton. He was educated by private tutor, but abandoned his schooling at the age of 14 to join the London firm of Copestake Moore and Co. In 1863, he emigrated to Western Australia, arriving on board the Strathmore on 25 March. He then entered commerce in Perth and Geraldton. On 13 February 1868 he married Anne Morris, with whom he had three sons and three daughters. They lived in a large residence on the corner of Bulwer and Lord Streets in Perth, which he named Dilhorn after his birthplace.

== Business and social life ==
In 1867, Loton partnered with Walter Padbury to form the firm of Padbury, Loton and Co. The firm was involved in a variety of mercantile activities, mostly in the north-west of the state, and owned three coastal trading ships. It was also involved in a number of agricultural and pastoral developments, with extensive property holdings in the north west and also at Perth, Guildford and Northam. Loton sold out of the partnership in 1889, thereafter concentrating his efforts on two of his properties.

Between 1870 and 1910, Loton was heavily involved in numerous businesses, boards and societies. He was a director of the Perth Building Society from 1872 to 1888; a director of the WA Bank from 1882 to 1924, and its chairman after 1909; and a director of CML Insurance. In 1884 he was appointed a Justice of the Peace. He was active in a number of clubs and societies, including the Northam Agricultural Society and the Royal Agricultural Society. He served on the Central Board of Education until 1892, and was a member of the Metropolitan Water Board in 1909 and 1910. In 1871 he was a foundation member of the Weld Club, and he later became a life member of the Western Australian Club. He was a benefactor of St George's Cathedral, and a trustee of the Church of England in Western Australia from 1888.

== Political life ==
On 14 July of that year, he was nominated to the Western Australian Legislative Council, a position that he held until resigning on 13 December 1887. A little over a year later on 4 February 1889, he was elected to the Legislative Council seat of Greenough in succession to Alfred Hensman. When Western Australia gained responsible government in December 1890, Loton won the seat of Swan in the Legislative Assembly, holding it until the election of 4 May 1897, which he did not contest. In 1891 he was part of the Western Australian delegation to the National Australasian Convention, at which the future federation of the Australian colonies was discussed, and he was again appointed to attend the Federal Conventions of 1897 and 1898.

On 13 June 1898, Loton won a Legislative Council Central Province seat in a by-election. He held it until the election of May 1900, which he did not contest. He unsuccessfully contested the Legislative Assembly seat of Moore on 24 April 1901, then served for about a year as Mayor of Perth. In May 1902 he won an East Province seat in the Legislative Council in a by-election, holding it until his retirement from politics at the election of 21 May 1908.

== Later life ==
Loton was made a knight bachelor in the 1923 Birthday Honours. He died at Dilhorn on 22 October 1924, and was buried in Karrakatta Cemetery.

Loton was the original owner of Loton's Paddock. He sold it to the Perth Council in September 1904, and they established a recreation area there. It was named Loton Park until 1909 when it was renamed Perth Oval.
