= McKenzie Grant =

Australian politician

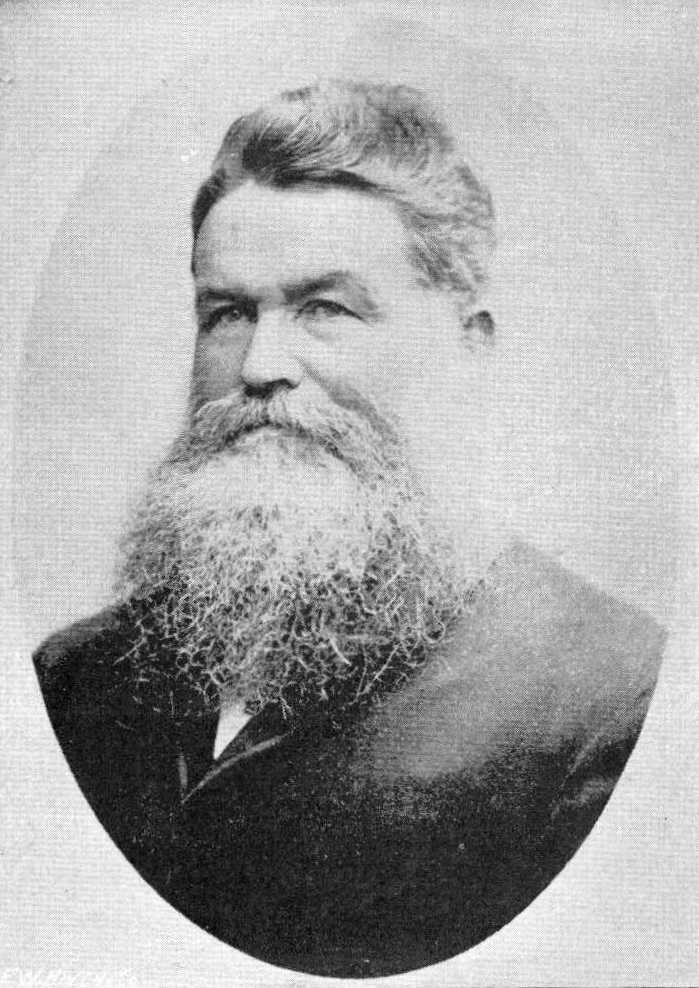

Member of the Legislative Council of Western Australia
- In office 12 March 1880 – 29 April 1887
- Preceded by: Charles Harper
- Succeeded by: Alexander Richardson
- Constituency: Northern District
- In office 30 January 1889 – 21 October 1890
- Preceded by: Edward Keane
- Succeeded by: None (council reconstituted)
- Constituency: Geraldton
- In office 24 December 1890 – 17 July 1893
- Preceded by: None (council reconstituted)
- Succeeded by: John Hassell
- Constituency: None (nominated by governor)

Personal details
- Born: c. 1834 Scotland
- Died: September 15, 1897 (aged 62–63) Perth, Western Australia, Australia

McKenzie Grant (c. 1834 – 15 September 1897) was an Australian pastoralist and politician. He owned or leased large quantities of land in Western Australia, especially in the North-West, and served in the Legislative Council of Western Australia from 1880 to 1887 and again from 1889 to 1893.

== Early life ==
Grant was born in Scotland to Margaret (née McKenzie) and George Grant. He arrived in Australia in 1852, during the Victorian gold rush, and initially worked on the goldfields at Bendigo. He then went to Queensland for a period before returning to Victoria and settling in Portland. In 1864, Grant was involved in the formation of the Portland Squatting Company, along with brothers Alexander and John Richardson and several others. The syndicate sought to exploit liberal land regulations in other colonies, and the following year its founders sailed to the North-West and established Pyramid Station. Grant remained in the Pilbara when the company was dissolved a few years later, and went into partnership with Charles Harper on the De Grey River. He also bought land in the nearby town of Roebourne.

== Politics and later life ==
In March 1880, Grant was elected to the Legislative Council's Northern District, serving until April 1887. Having earlier purchased property in the Victoria Land District, he returned to parliament in January 1889 as the member for the seat of Geraldton. The Legislative Council was reconstituted in 1890 as the upper house of a new bicameral parliament, and Grant continued to serve as a nominee of the governor, William Robinson. He resigned his seat in July 1893, after falling ill, and died in Perth in September 1897. Grant had married Jane Hunter Eagar in 1875, with whom he had six sons and a daughter.

== See also ==
- Members of the Western Australian Legislative Council
