= Charles Warton =

British and Australian politician

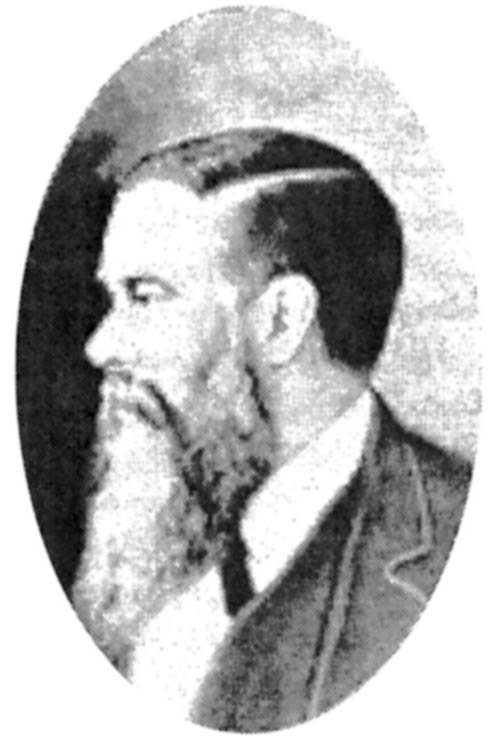
Charles Warton

Charles Nicholas Warton (1832 – 31 July 1900) was a barrister and politician who sat in the House of Commons of the United Kingdom as a Conservative from 1880 to 1885. In 1886, he was appointed Attorney-General of Western Australia.

== Biography ==
Warton was the son of Charles Warton of Burwash, Sussex and his wife Maria. He attended University College School in London from 1845 to 1847, and was admitted to Clare College, Cambridge in 1851, but did not graduate. He was at Lincoln's Inn from 1857 until 1861, when he was called to the Bar of the English South-Eastern Circuit. For the next 25 years, he worked as a barrister and resided at Clapham.

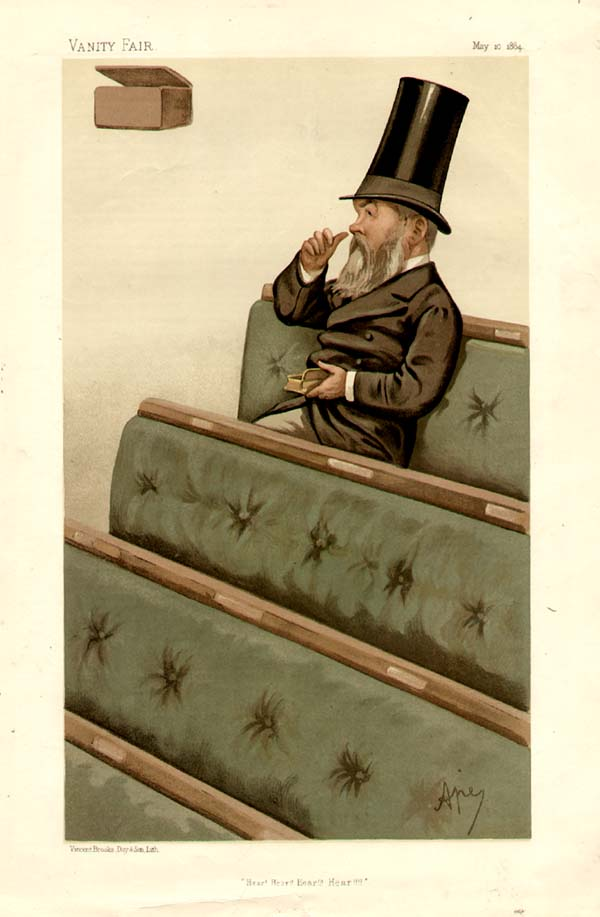
"Hear! Hear!! Hear!!! Hear!!!!" Warton as caricatured by Ape (Carlo Pellegrini) in Vanity Fair, May 1884

In 1880, Warton was elected to the House of Commons as Member for Bridport. He held the seat until 1885, during which time he gained a reputation for insisting on the enforcement of procedural rules, thereby hindering the passage of otherwise unopposed bills.

In October 1886 Warton was appointed to the position of Attorney-General of Western Australia, arriving at Fremantle on R.M.S. Rome on 30 November. His appointment as Attorney General and member of the Executive and Legislative Councils was gazetted on 9 December 1886.

With the exception of a two-month gap in early 1888, he held these appointments until December 1890, when he returned to England and retirement. He died at Hampstead, London, at the age of 68.

Warton married Agnes Wood, daughter of G H Wood, on 24 August 1864 and had at least one son.

Parliament of the United Kingdom
Preceded by Pandeli Ralli	Member of Parliament for Bridport; 1880 – 1885	Constituency abolished
