= Electoral district of Murray and Williams =

Former electoral district of the Western Australian Legislative Council

Murray and Williams Western Australia—Legislative Council
- State: Western Australia
- Dates current: 1874–1890
- Namesake: Murray River; Williams River

Murray and Williams was an electoral district of the Legislative Council of Western Australia from 1874 to 1890, during the period when the Legislative Council was the sole chamber of the Parliament of Western Australia.

Murray and Williams was created by the Legislative Council Act Amendment Act 1873 (37 Vict. No. 22), along with the Northern District. It comprised parts of the districts of Fremantle and Wellington. The district included almost all of what is now called the Peel region, as well as areas of the Wheatbelt, South West, and Great Southern, with its eastern boundary being a portion of the Great Australian Bight coastline. Murray and Williams was bordered to the north by the districts of Fremantle, Perth, and York, and to the south by the district of Wellington.

Four men represented Murray and Williams in the Legislative Council between 1870 and 1890 – Samuel Hamersley, Septimus Burt, Theodore Fawcett, and William Paterson. Burt and Paterson went on to serve in the Legislative Assembly following the advent of responsible government in 1890.

== Members ==
Member	Party	Term
Samuel Hamersley	None	1874–1880
Septimus Burt	None	1880–1886
Theodore Fawcett	None	1886–1889
William Paterson	None	1889–1890
