= Executive Council of Western Australia =

Agency overview
- Formed: 1890
- Jurisdiction: State of Western Australia
- Headquarters: Government House
- Agency executives: Chris Dawson, AC APM, Governor of Western Australia; The Honourable Peter Quinlan, Lieutenant Governor

The Executive Council of Western Australia advises the Governor of Western Australia on matters relating to the government of the State. The governor can then give legal form to decisions made by the Cabinet of Western Australia. It consists of the state's ministers and is presided over by the governor of Western Australia; The governor is not a member of the executive council. The council typically meets fortnightly and do so in Government House.

While the Governor generally acts in accordance with the advice of the Premier and ministers, the Governor can act independently. In the event that the Governor is unable to preside over the executive council, the Lieutenant-Governor will perform the governor's functions.

== History ==
The executive council, often referred to as 'the office of the governor', was first legally provisioned in the Letters Patent, enacted in 1986. However, it has effectively existed since 1832. This is due to the Governor being a member of the Legislative Council at the time. Meaning the functions of the current executive council were included in the Upper House.
