= Colonial Secretary of Western Australia =

Public office in colonial Western Australia

The colonial secretary of Western Australia was one of the most important and powerful public offices in Western Australia, in the time when Western Australia was a British colony. The colonial secretary was the representative of the British Colonial Office in Western Australia, and was usually appointed from Britain. He was responsible for all official correspondence between the colony and the Colonial Office. He was at all times a member of the Western Australian Legislative Council and the Executive Council of Western Australia.

After Western Australia gained responsible government in 1890, the office of Colonial Secretary became a ministerial portfolio. The responsibilities of the office changed substantially, and it was no longer such an important role. In 1917 the office of Colonial Secretary was described as being:

responsible for a large number of departments including [Aboriginals ...], Public Health, charities and many of the state trading concerns including the State Shipping Service. The position required a great deal of detailed work and would always attract many Parliamentary Questions, but did not allow the minister much scope for initiative or achievement.

Since Western Australia was no longer a British colony after 1901, the office of Colonial Secretary was misnamed after this date. In 1924, the office was renamed to Chief Secretary.

== List of colonial secretaries of Western Australia ==
The following is a list of colonial secretaries of Western Australia:

Colonial Secretary	Period in office
Peter Broun	1828–1846
George Fletcher Moore (acting)	November 1846–1847
Richard Robert Madden	May 1847–1849
Revett Bland (acting)	January 1849–March 1850
Thomas Yule (acting)	March 1850–October 1850
Charles Alexander John Piesse	October 1850–March 1851
Thomas Yule (acting)	March–December 1851
Thomas Falconer	From March 1851 but never arrived in colony
William Ayshford Sanford	January 1852–July 1855
Frederick Barlee	July 1855–24 November 1875 (on leave from 24 July 1875)
Anthony O'Grady Lefroy (acting)	24 July 1875–30 August 1877
Roger Goldsworthy (Note: Hamilton has George Braithwaite Phillips acting between 7 September 1880 to 2 November 1880.)	30 August 1877–7 September 1880
Edric Gifford	2 November 1880–21 January 1883
Malcolm Fraser	5 January 1883–28 December 1890
Matthew Smith (acting)	8 December 1885–18 April 1887
George Shenton	29 December 1890–11 October 1892
Stephen Parker	11 October 1892–4 December 1894
John Forrest	4 December 1894–28 April 1898
George Randell	28 April 1898–27 May 1901
Frederick Illingworth	27 May–21 November 1901
Matthew Moss	21 November–23 December 1901
Frederick Illingworth	23 December 1901–30 June 1902
Walter Kingsmill	1 July 1902–10 August 1904
George Taylor	10 August 1904–7 June 1905
John Drew	7 June–5 August 1905
Walter Kingsmill	25 August 1905–7 May 1906
John Connolly	7 May 1906–7 October 1911
John Drew	7 October 1911–27 July 1916
Hal Colebatch	27 July 1916–17 April 1919
Charles Hudson	17 April–17 May 1919
John Scaddan	17 May–25 June 1919
Frank Broun	25 June 1919–22 August 1922
Richard Sampson	22 August 1922–16 April 1924
