= Alexander Forrest =

Australian politician (1849–1901)

The Honourable Alexander Forrest CMG
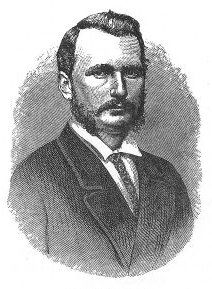

Member of the Legislative Council of Western Australia
- In office 1 February 1887 – 21 October 1890
- Preceded by: None
- Succeeded by: None
- Constituency: Kimberley

Member of the Legislative Assembly of Western Australia
- In office 27 November 1890 – 20 June 1901
- Preceded by: None (new creation)
- Succeeded by: Sydney Pigott
- Constituency: West Kimberley

Personal details
- Born: 22 September 1849 Bunbury, Western Australia
- Died: 20 June 1901 (aged 51) Perth, Western Australia

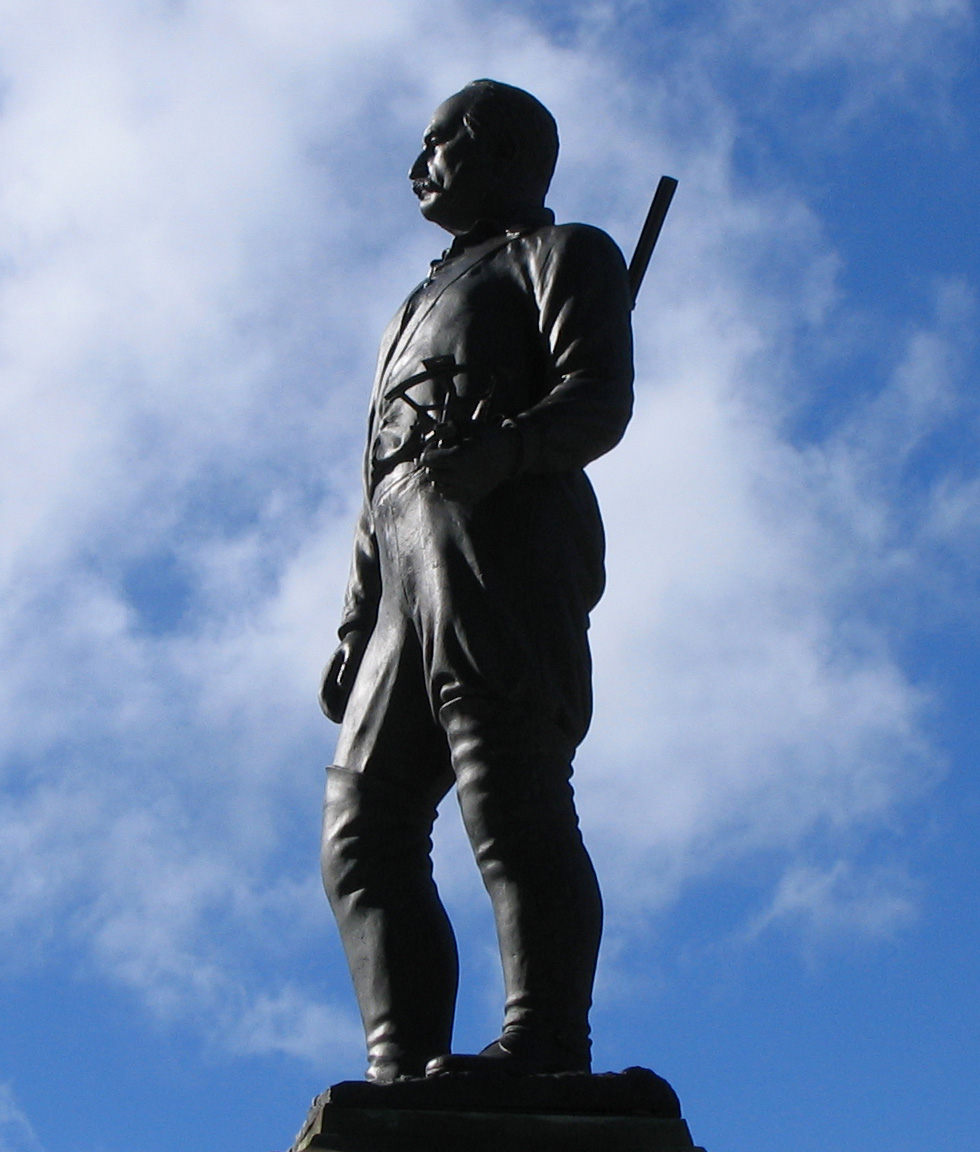
Detail of the statue by Pietro Porcelli

Alexander Forrest CMG (22 September 1849 – 20 June 1901) was an explorer and surveyor of Western Australia, and later also a member of parliament.

As a government surveyor, Forrest explored many areas of remote Western Australia, particularly the Kimberley region. Several of his expeditions were conducted alongside his brother, John Forrest, who became the first Premier of Western Australia. In later life, Forrest served in the Legislative Council from 1887 to 1890, representing the seat of Kimberley. Following the advent of responsible government, he was elected to the Legislative Assembly, representing the seat of West Kimberley from 1890 until his death. He was also mayor of Perth on two occasions, from 1892 to 1895 and from 1897 to 1900.

== Early life ==
Forrest was born at Picton, near Bunbury in Western Australia, the fourth of nine sons of William and Margaret Forrest. He was educated at the government school in Bunbury under John Hislop, then completed his education at Hale School in Perth.

== Exploring career ==
Forrest explored areas of Western Australia under contract to the Survey Department, particularly the Kimberley region, during the 1870s and 1880s. Much of his exploration was done with his brother John Forrest who became the first Premier of Western Australia.

In 1870, a party of six men including Alexander and his brother John left Perth. Five months later they reached Adelaide. In 1874, Alexander was part of another party again including brother John which took a more northerly route from Geraldton to the east to the Murchison River.

In 1891, through a syndicate comprising Charles Crossland and George Leake, Alexander Forrest commenced the subdivision of what would later become the affluent Perth suburb of Peppermint Grove. He was also associated with the first of three quarries that exist on the edge of Greenmount Hill. In 1893, he negotiated the contract with the Adelaide Steamship Company for serving Western Australian ports.

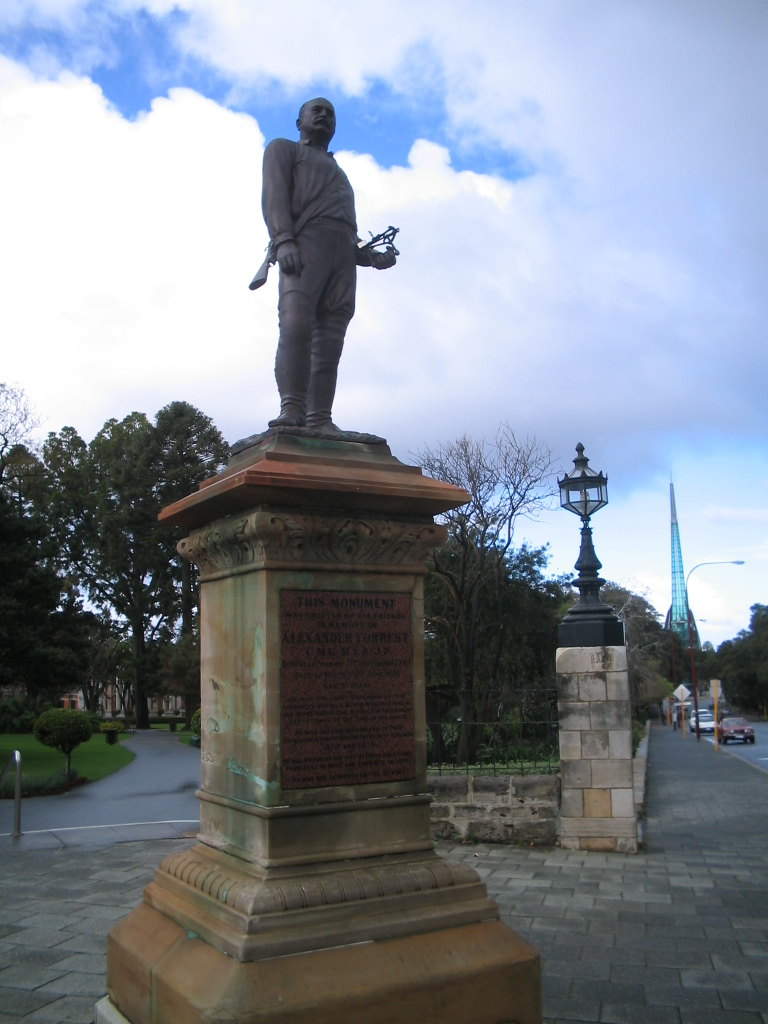
A statue of Forrest stands at the entrance to Stirling Gardens in St Georges Terrace, Perth

== Views and Racism ==
The Australian Dictionary of Biography Alexander considers Alexander was a paternalistic conservative.

Alexander was opposed to Women's Suffrage stating "the proper place for a woman was to look after her home and not be running all over the place."

While in Parliament, Alexander Forrest consistently supported and argued for state backed violence against indigenous people. According to Marxist Left Review, in an 1888 speech to Parliament Forrest advocated for "state terrorism" against indigenous people.

Historian Henry Reynolds states that during the 1890s Alexander - along with his brother John - witnessed and was complicit in the "violent suppression of Aboriginal resistance in the Kimberley... [where] Alexander [and the Forrest family], were deeply involved in the whole venture as leaseholders, managers and financiers".

== Honours and Death ==
He was made a Companion of the Order of St Michael and St George (CMG) on 15 May 1901, in preparation of the forthcoming royal visit of the Duke and Duchess of Cornwall and York (later King George V and Queen Mary).

Forrest died on 20 June 1901 at Perth of complications arising from kidney trouble. He was survived by four of his five children (his son Anthony Alexander Forrest having been killed the month before in the Second Boer War), and was buried at Karrakatta Cemetery.
