= Electoral district of Geraldton (Legislative Council) =

Former Western Australian Legislative Council electoral district

Geraldton Western Australia—Legislative Council
- State: Western Australia
- Dates current: 1870–1890
- Namesake: Geraldton

Geraldton was an electoral district of the Legislative Council of Western Australia from 1870 to 1890, during the period when the Legislative Council was the sole chamber of the Parliament of Western Australia.

Geraldton was one of the original ten Legislative Council districts created by the Legislative Council Act 1870 (33 Vict, No. 13). The district's initial boundary ran east from the mouth of the Greenough River to Wizard Peak (in Moonyoonooka), then to the Irwin River and finally due east to the border with South Australia. It took in all of what is now considered North West Australia (including the Gascoyne, Kimberley, and Pilbara regions), as well as most of the Mid West. After the passage of the Legislative Council Act Amendment Act 1873 (37 Vict. No. 22), the district's boundaries were altered, with all of its territory above the 27th parallel south transferred to the new North District.

Seven men were elected to represent Geraldton in the Legislative Council, with Edward Wittenoom serving two non-consecutive terms. Maitland Brown served the longest, from 1874 to 1883.

== Members ==
Member	Party	Term
Major Logue	None	1870–1874
Maitland Brown	None	1874–1883
Edward Wittenoom	None	1883–1884
John Davis	None	1884
Samuel Mitchell	None	1884–1885
Edward Wittenoom	None	1885–1886
Edward Vivien Harvey Keane	None	1886–1889
McKenzie Grant	None	1889–1890
