= Attorney-General of Western Australia =

Chief law officer for the state of western Australia, Australia

- Western Australian coat of arms

- Flag of Western Australia

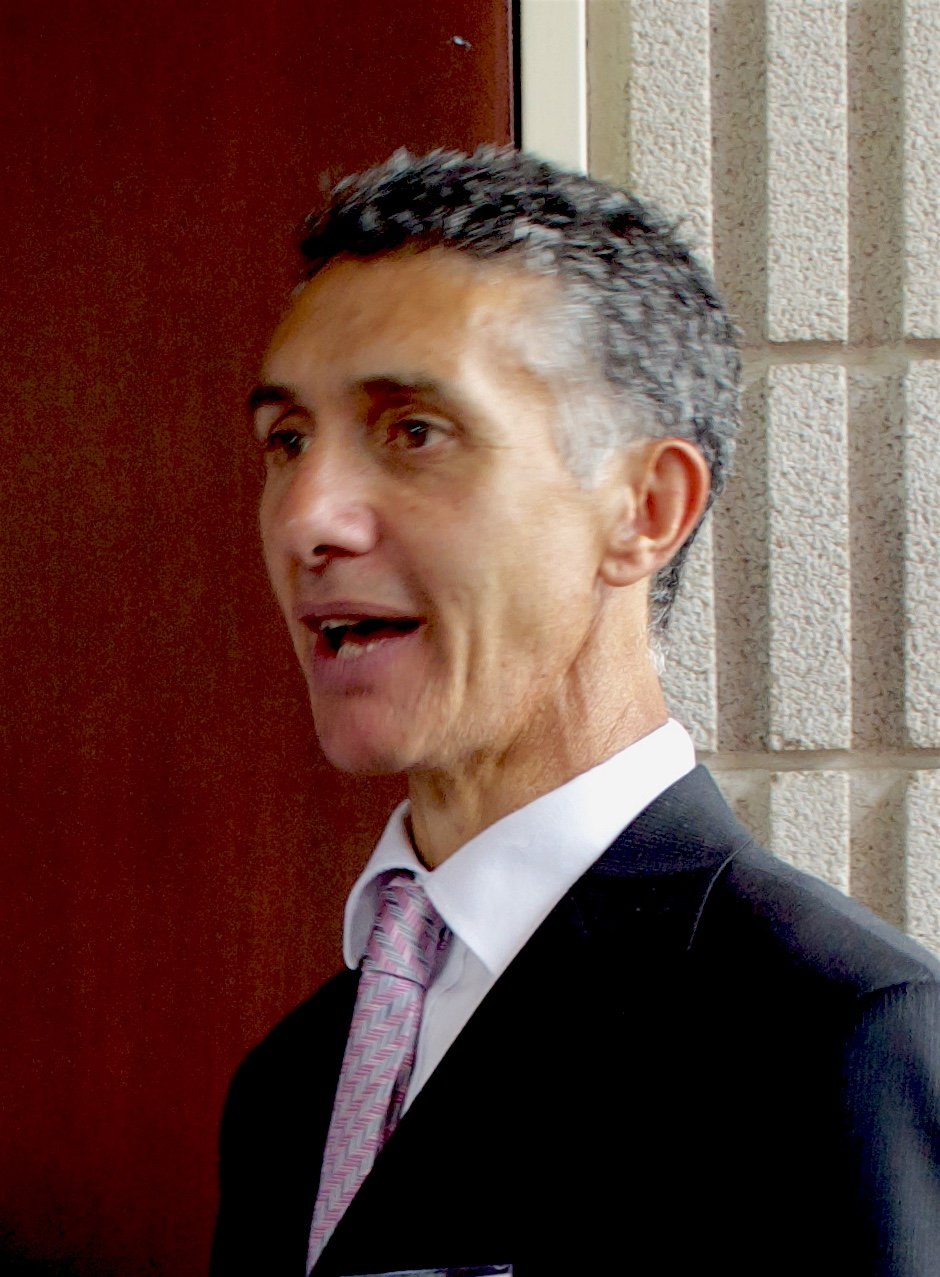
- Incumbent; Tony Buti since 19 March 2025
- Department of Justice
- Style: The Honourable
- Member of: Parliament; Cabinet; Executive Council
- Reports to: Premier of Western Australia
- Seat: Dumas House, Perth
- Nominator: Premier of Western Australia
- Appointer: Governor of Western Australia on the advice of the premier
- Term length: At the governor's pleasure
- Formation: 1831
- First holder: William Mackie (as Advocate-General)
- Website: www.justice.wa.gov.au

The Attorney-General of Western Australia is the member of the Government of Western Australia responsible for maintenance and improvement of Western Australia's system of law and justice. Before the advent of representative government in 1870, the title was Advocate-General of Western Australia. The Attorney-General must be a qualified legal practitioner. When there are none in the cabinet, a lay person is sometimes appointed to the office of Minister for Justice.

The current Attorney-General of Western Australia, since 19 March 2025, is Tony Buti who administers the portfolio through the Department of Justice and a range of other agencies.

One of Buti's predecessors Christian Porter went on to become Federal Attorney General.

== List ==
This is a list of Attorneys-General of Western Australia, or any precedent titles. The office of Attorney-General was not always filled: the Australian Parliamentary Library notes that where there was no lawyer among the ministers elected, there would be a Minister for Justice instead of an Attorney-General.

Order	Minister	Party	Premier	Title	Term start	Term end	Time in office
1	William Mackie	none		Advocate-General	1831	1834	2–3 years
2	George Fletcher Moore	none		Advocate-General	1834	1846	11–12 years
3	Richard West Nash	none		Acting Advocate-General	1846	1847	0–1 years
(2)	George Fletcher Moore	none		Advocate-General	1847	1852	4–5 years
4	B. W. Vigors	none		Acting Advocate-General	1852	1854	1–2 years
5	George Frederick Stone	none		Advocate-General	1854	1857	2–3 years
6	Richard Burnie	none		Advocate-General	1857	1859	1–2 years
(5)	George Frederick Stone	none		Advocate-General	1860	1870	9–10 years
7	Robert John Walcott	none		Attorney-General	4 November 1870	December 1872	2 years, 27 days
8	Sir Henry Hicks Hocking	none		Attorney-General	December 1872	30 June 1874	1 year, 211 days
9	Sir George Walpole Leake QC	none		Attorney-General	30 June 1874	16 January 1875	200 days
(8)	Henry Hicks Hocking	none		Attorney-General	16 January 1875	25 February 1879	4 years, 40 days
9	Sir George Walpole Leake QC	none		Attorney-General	1 March 1879	24 November 1879	268 days
10	Edward Albert Stone	none		Attorney-General	24 November 1879	21 March 1880	118 days
(9)	Sir George Walpole Leake QC	none		Attorney-General	21 March 1880	21 March 1881	1 year, 0 days
11	Alexander Onslow	none		Attorney-General	21 March 1881	9 April 1883	2 years, 19 days
(9)	Sir George Walpole Leake QC	none		Attorney-General	9 April 1883	10 July 1883	92 days
12	Alfred Hensman	none		Attorney-General	10 July 1883	18 June 1886	2 years, 343 days
13	Septimus Burt	none		Attorney-General	19 June 1886	3 December 1886	167 days
14	Charles Warton	none		Attorney-General	9 December 1886	December 1890	4 years, 20 days
(13)	Septimus Burt	none	Forrest	Attorney-General	29 December 1890	27 October 1897	6 years, 302 days
15	Richard Pennefather	none	Forrest	Attorney-General	27 October 1897	20 March 1901	3 years, 144 days
16	William Sayer	none	Throssell	Attorney-General	25 March 1901	27 May 1901	68 days
17	George Leake KC	none	Leake	Attorney-General	27 May 1901	21 November 1901	178 days
18	Frederick Moorhead	none	Morgans	Attorney-General	21 November 1901	23 December 1901	32 days
(17)	George Leake KC	none	Leake	Attorney-General	23 December 1901	24 June 1902	183 days
19	Walter James	none	James	Attorney-General	1 July 1902	10 August 1904	2 years, 40 days
20	Norbert Keenan	Ministerialist	Moore	Attorney-General	14 May 1906	14 May 1909	3 years, 0 days
21	John Nanson	Ministerialist	Wilson	Attorney-General	16 September 1910	7 October 1911	1 year, 21 days
22	Thomas Walker	Labor	Scadden	Attorney-General	7 October 1911	27 July 1916	4 years, 294 days
23	Robert Robinson	Liberal	Wilson	Attorney-General	27 July 1916	28 June 1917	2 years, 294 days
23	Robert Robinson	Nationalist	Lefroy	Attorney-General	28 June 1917	17 April 1919	2 years, 294 days
23	Robert Robinson	Nationalist	Colebatch	Attorney-General	17 April 1919	17 May 1919	2 years, 294 days
24	Thomas Draper	Nationalist	Mitchell	Attorney-General	17 May 1919	12 March 1921	1 year, 299 days
25	Thomas Davy	Nationalist	Mitchell	Attorney-General	24 April 1930	18 February 1933	2 years, 300 days
26	Hubert Parker	Labor	Collier	Attorney-General	22 February 1933	8 April 1933	45 days
27	Robert Ross McDonald	Liberal	McLarty	Attorney-General	1 April 1947	5 January 1948	279 days
28	Arthur Abbott	Liberal	McLarty	Attorney-General	5 January 1948	23 February 1953	5 years, 49 days
29	Arthur Watts	Liberal	Brand	Attorney-General	2 April 1959	31 January 1962	2 years, 304 days
30	Ron Bertram	Labor	Tonkin	Attorney-General	3 March 1971	30 September 1971	211 days
31	Tom Evans	Labor	Tonkin	Attorney-General	12 October 1971	8 April 1974	2 years, 178 days
32	Ian Medcalf	Liberal	Court	Attorney-General	22 December 1975	25 January 1982	7 years, 65 days
32	Ian Medcalf	Liberal	O'Connor	Attorney-General	25 January 1982	25 February 1983	7 years, 65 days
33	Joe Berinson	Labor	Burke	Attorney-General	25 February 1983	25 February 1988	9 years, 357 days
33	Joe Berinson	Labor	Dowding	Attorney-General	25 February 1988	12 February 1990	9 years, 357 days
33	Joe Berinson	Labor	Lawrence	Attorney-General	12 February 1990	16 February 1993	3 years, 4 days
34	Cheryl Edwardes	Liberal	Court	Attorney-General	16 February 1993	21 December 1995	2 years, 308 days
35	Peter Foss	Liberal	Court	Attorney-General	21 December 1995	16 February 2001	5 years, 57 days
36	Jim McGinty	Labor	Gallop	Attorney-General	16 February 2001	25 January 2006	7 years, 220 days
36	Jim McGinty	Labor	Carpenter	Attorney-General	25 January 2006	23 September 2008	7 years, 220 days
37	Christian Porter	Liberal	Barnett	Attorney-General	23 September 2008	12 June 2012	3 years, 279 days
38	Michael Mischin	Liberal	Barnett	Attorney-General	28 June 2012	17 March 2017	4 years, 262 days
39	John Quigley	Labor	McGowan	Attorney-General	17 March 2017	8 June 2023	8 years, 2 days
39	John Quigley	Labor	Cook	Attorney-General	8 June 2023	19 March 2025	8 years, 2 days
40	Tony Buti	Labor	Cook	Attorney-General	19 March 2025	incumbent	1 year, 172 days
