= Alexander McRae (explorer) =

Australian explorer, pastoralist and businessman

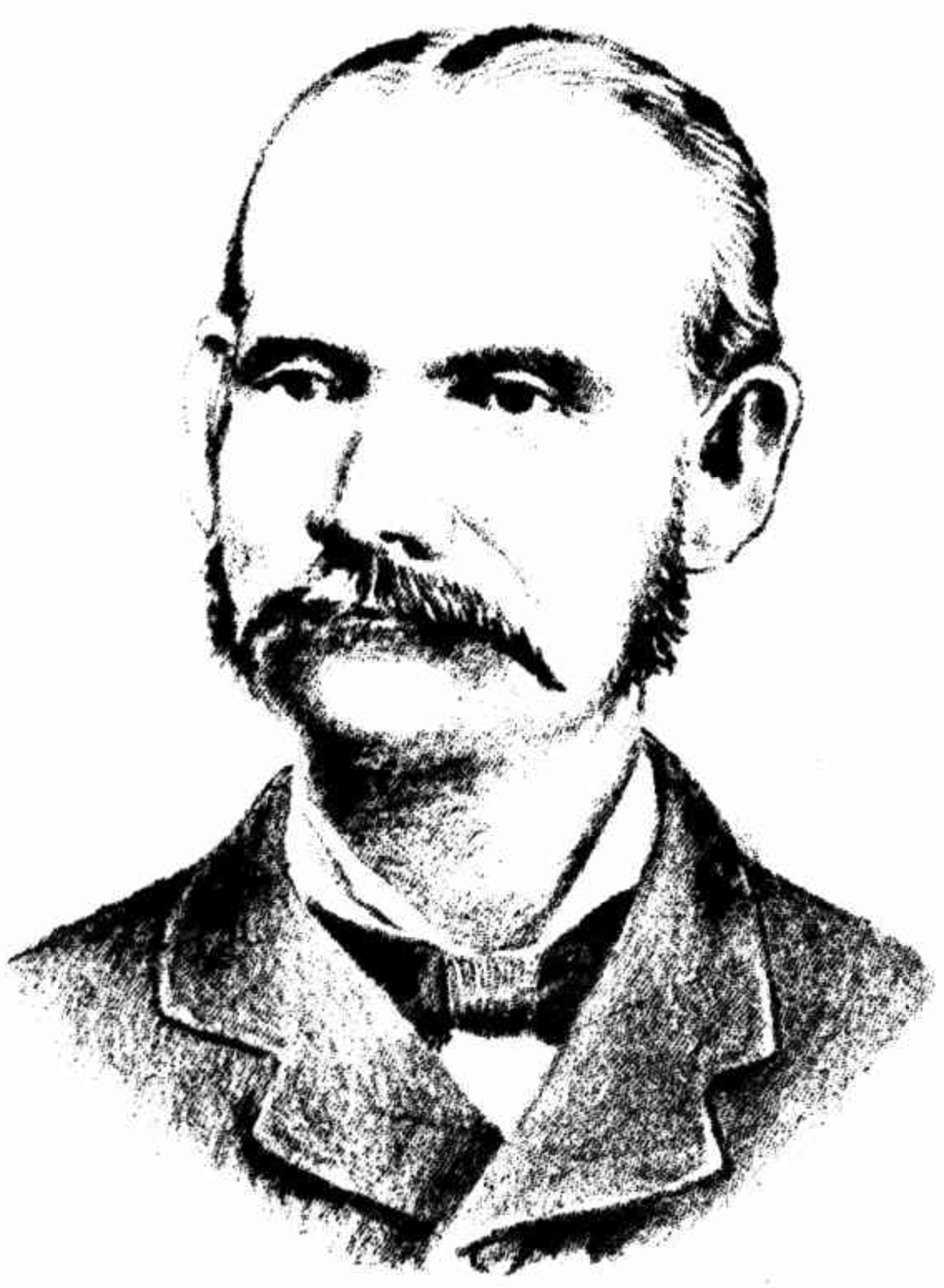
McRae in c. 1888

Alexander Joseph McRae (1844–1888) was an Australian explorer, pastoralist and businessman. McRae was notable as an early settler in north-west Western Australia. In 1882 McRae found gold between Cossack and Roebourne, with one nugget weighing upwards of 9 dwt (14g).

The McRae River is named after him.

== Bibliography ==
- Ballarat & District Genealogical Society, ‘Duncan McRae 1804–1889 & Janet McRae c1818–1899’, 2009 <https://web.archive.org/web/20110219115325/http://www.ballaratgenealogy.org.au/digby/family/mcrae_dun.htm> [Retrieved: June 5, 2009]
- Traditional Owners – Millstream Park Council, Department of Environment and Conservation & Conservation Commission of Western Australia, Millstream-Chichester National Park and Mungaroona Range Nature Reserve Draft Management Plan 2007, Perth WA, Department of Environment and Conservation, 2007.
