= Alfred Hensman =

Australian politician

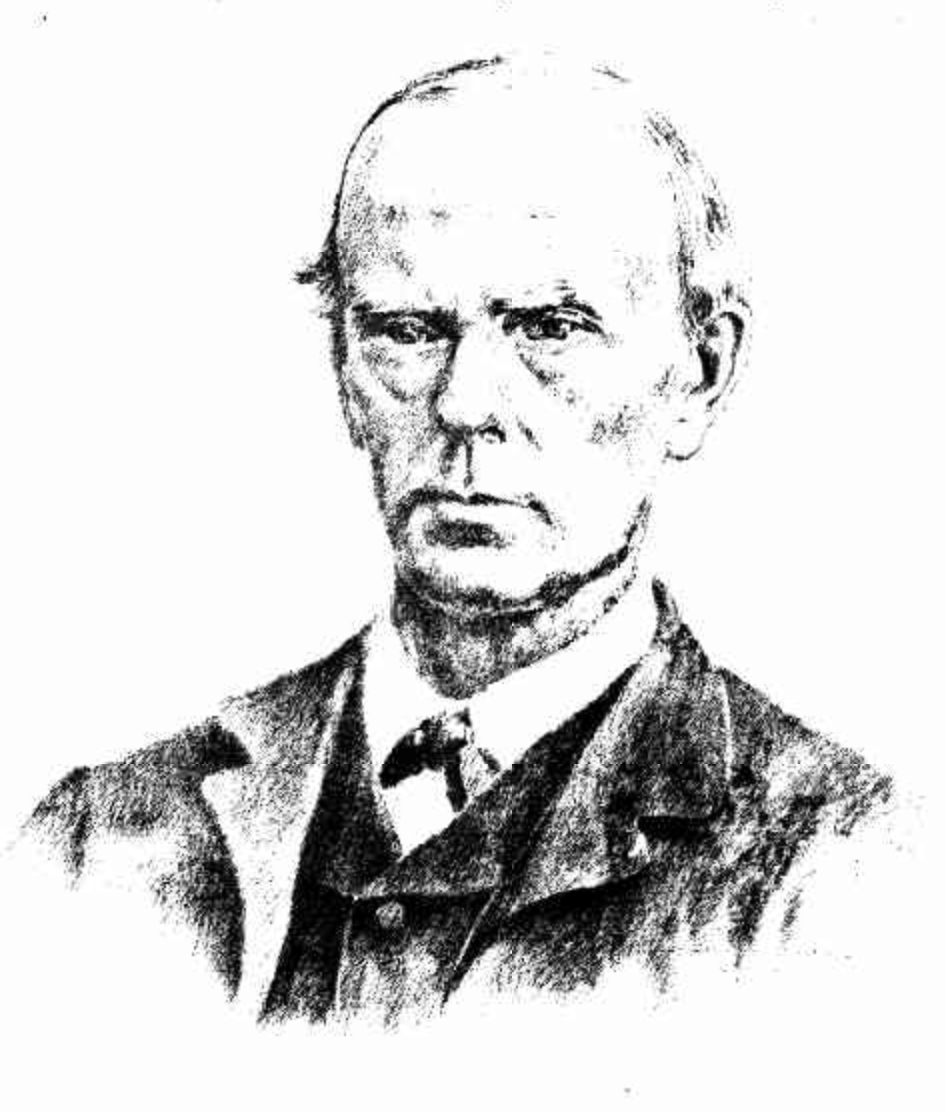
Alfred Hensman in 1887

Alfred Peach Hensman (12 May 1834 – 5 October 1902) was a politician and Attorney-General of Western Australia.

Hensman was the second son of John Hensman, solicitor, Northampton, England. He was educated at the University of London, and became B.A. in 1853, and a member of Convocation. He entered at the Middle Temple on 29 May 1852; and was called to the bar on 26 January 1858. He was a revising barrister and author of a "Handbook of the Constitution." In 1883 he was appointed Attorney-General of Western Australia with a seat in the Executive and Legislative Councils. He resigned in 1886 owing to a dispute with the Governor, Sir Frederick Napier Broome, but still resided in Western Australia, and in 1892 was appointed the third judge of the Supreme Court.

He died at The Priory, Chatteris, on 5 October 1902.

His son-in-law, Adam Jameson, was a member of parliament.
