= Western Australian Legislative Council =

Upper house of the legislature of Western Australia

Legislative Council
- 42nd Parliament

Type
- Type: Upper house of the Parliament of Western Australia

History
- Founded: 7 February 1832; 194 years ago

Leadership
- President: Alanna Clohesy, Labor since 25 May 2021
- Chair of Committees: Steve Martin, Liberal since 22 May 2025
- Leader of the Government: Stephen Dawson, Labor since 17 March 2025
- Deputy Leader of the Government: Jackie Jarvis, Labor since 17 March 2025

Structure
- Seats: 37
- Political groups: Government (16); Labor (16); Opposition (12) (Note: After the 2025 election, the Nationals and Liberals formed an opposition alliance. However, it is not a formal coalition and both parties maintain their independence from each other.); Liberal (10); National (2); Crossbench (9); Greens (4); One Nation (2); Animal Justice (1); Christians (1); Legalise Cannabis (1)
- Length of term: 4 years

Elections
- Voting system: Single transferable vote
- Last election: 8 March 2025
- Next election: 10 March 2029

Meeting place
- Legislative Council Chamber; Parliament House, Perth; Western Australia, Australia

Website
- WA Legislative Council

The Western Australian Legislative Council is the upper house of the Parliament of Western Australia, a state of Australia. It is regarded as a house of review for legislation passed by the Legislative Assembly, the lower house. The two Houses of Parliament sit in Parliament House in the state capital, Perth.

Until 2021, for the election of members of the Legislative Council, the state was divided into six electoral regions by community of interest – three metropolitan and three rural – each electing six members to the Legislative Council using single transferable voting (STV). Each Council region overlapped with a varying number of Assembly seats and contained a variable number of voters, with the rural regions each containing significantly fewer voters than the metropolitan regions. The Legislative Council had traditionally been controlled by a coalition of the Liberal and National parties.

At the 2021 election, Labor won majority control of the chamber, the first time any party gained the majority in the upper house since 1983. Subsequently, legislation was passed later that year to abolish the six regions and increase the size of the council to 37 seats, all elected at-large and continuing to use STV to elect the members. The use of a state-wide district, as is also used in New South Wales and South Australia, lowers the threshold for entry to the chamber (the quota) to below 3% of the state-wide vote (as determined by first preferences alone or a combination of first preference votes and votes transferred in accordance to lower preferences), thus ensuring minor parties and independents receive their due share of seats. The changes took effect in the 2025 election.

The 2025 Legislative Council election has set two records - the largest number of members elected in a single contest in Australian history, and the smallest quota used in such an election (about 2.63 percent of valid votes). It is also one of the largest contests held anywhere using STV.

Since the 2013 state election, both houses of Parliament have had fixed four-year terms, with elections being held every four years on the second Saturday in March.

== Current distribution of seats ==
The current composition of the Legislative Council is as follows:

Party	Seats held	Legislative Council
Labor	16	
Liberal	10	
Greens	4	
Nationals	2	
One Nation	2	
Legalise Cannabis	1	
Christians	1	
Animal Justice	1	
Total	37	

- 19 votes as a majority are required to pass legislation.

== History ==
Western Australia's first representative parliament was the Legislative Council, first created in 1832 as an appointive body. Initially it consisted only of official members; that is, public officials whose office guaranteed them a place on the council. The initial appointees were the Governor, James Stirling, the Senior Military Officer next in command to the Governor, Frederick Irwin, the Colonial Secretary, Peter Broun, the Surveyor-General, John Septimus Roe, and the Advocate-General, William Mackie. The Legislative Council first met on 7 February 1832.

Three years later, an attempt was made to expand the council by including four unofficial members to be nominated by the governor. However, the public demand for elected rather than nominated members was so great that implementation of the change was delayed until 1838.

In 1850, the British Parliament passed an act, the Australian Constitutions Act 1850 (13 & 14 Vict. c. 59), that permitted the Australian colonies to establish legislative councils that were one-third nominated and two-thirds elected, but only under the condition that the colonies take responsibility for the costs of their own government. Because of this provision, Western Australia was slow to adopt the system. In 1867, the governor responded to public demand for representative government by holding unofficial elections and subsequently nominating each elected person to the council. Three years later, representative government was officially adopted and the Legislative Council was changed to consist of twelve elected members and six members nominated by the governor. Suffrage was limited to landowners and those with a prescribed level of income.

When Western Australia gained responsible government in 1890, a bicameral system was adopted and the Legislative Council became a house of review for legislation passed by the popularly elected Legislative Assembly. This council consisted of 15 members, all nominated by the governor. However, it was provided that once the population of the colony reached 60,000, the Legislative Council would become elective. The colony was expected to take many years to reach a population of 60,000 but the discovery of the eastern goldfields and the consequent gold rush caused that figure to be reached by 1893. The constitution was then amended to make the Legislative Council an elective house of 21 seats, with three members to be elected from each of seven provinces. The first election to the council was held following the dissolution of parliament in June 1894.

This system was retained until 1962 when, over the next two years, the council was reformed, creating a series of two-member electorates. Members were elected for six years; one from each electorate was elected every three years. Universal suffrage was also granted in order to bring the council into line with the assembly.

This arrangement remained until 10 June 1987 when the Burke Labor government, with the conditional support of the National Party, introduced a system of multi-member electorates with proportional representation through STV. The legislation was made possible because the Australian Democrats in 1986 negotiated an election preference flow to Labor in return for an explicit undertaking on Legislative Council electoral reform, which resulted in the defeat of a number of Liberal councillors who were committed to opposing such reform.

Following this reform, the state was divided into six electoral regions, three metropolitan and three rural, each electing between five and seven members to the Legislative Council. All seats would be up for re-election every four years. The new system maintained malapportionment across zones, such that the vote of a Perth voter counted for much less than that of a rural voter. While the Liberal Party and Labor Party were both advantaged and disadvantaged by this system, it strongly benefited the National Party. During the 1990s, Liberal Premier Richard Court considered further changing the system along the lines of that in place in South Australia, but backed down in the face of National Party opposition.

A 2005 reform established "one vote one value" in the assembly, but not in the council, where rural areas remained significantly overrepresented. The Perth metropolitan area accounted for 70% of the state's population, but only elected half of the council. The smallest region, the Mining and Pastoral Region, had 16% of the average number of electors in the three metropolitan regions, which on paper gave Mining and Pastoral voters six times the voting power of those in the city of Perth. However, according to ABC election analyst Antony Green, the actual bias was greater due to historically lower turnout in the Mining and Pastoral region.

Name	Electors (2021)	Electors per Member
Agricultural	103,378	17,230
East Metropolitan	423,759	70,627
Mining and Pastoral	69,651	11,609
North Metropolitan	427,779	71,297
South Metropolitan	449,182	74,864
South West	242,983	40,497
Total	1,716,732	47,687

According to Green, the rural weighting was still significant enough that it was all but impossible for a Liberal premier in Western Australia to govern without National support, even if the Liberals won enough Legislative Assembly seats to theoretically allow them to govern alone.

In 2021, the Labor Party used its first majority in both the Legislative Council and Legislative Assembly to remove the only malapportionment remaining in any state or territory legislative chamber in Australia. The six individual single transferable vote (STV) districts for the Legislative Council were dissolved. They were replaced by one state-wide district electing all 37 Legislative Councillors using STV. This took effect at the 2025 election.

== Constituencies ==
=== 1870–1890: Electoral districts ===
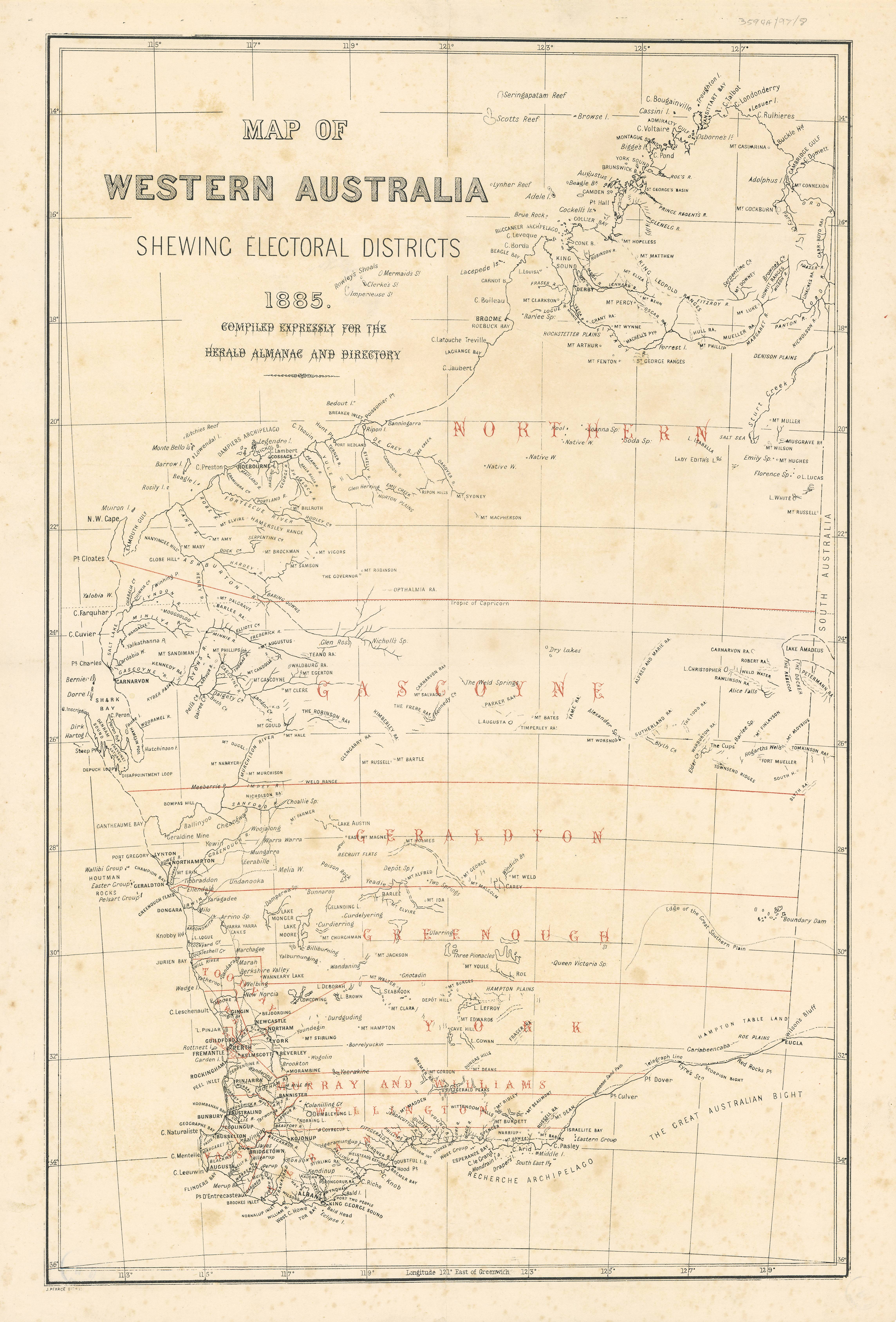
Map of Legislative Council electoral districts in 1885

The Legislative Council Act 1870, which took effect the same year, created ten electoral districts for the Legislative Council, electing twelve members in total. Three later acts of parliament (in 1874, 1883, and 1887) established four more electoral districts, created from the territory of existing districts.

- Albany
- Fremantle (two members)
- Gascoyne (1883)
- Geraldton
- Greenough
- Kimberley (1887)
- Murray and Williams (1874)
- The North (1874; two members from 1883)
- Perth (two members)
- Swan
- Toodyay
- Vasse
- Wellington
- York

=== 1894–1989: Electoral provinces ===
In 1890, following the creation of the Legislative Assembly, the Legislative Council returned to being a completely appointed body, with 15 members. The Constitution Act Amendment Act 1893 was subsequently passed, taking effect in 1894, to provide for seven electoral provinces, each electing three members. Additional provinces were created in 1897 and 1900, and a further reorganisation occurred in 1950 (following the passage of the Electoral Districts Act 1947 establishing an independent electoral commission).

- Central Province
- East Province (1894–1950)
- Metropolitan Province
- Metropolitan-Suburban Province (1900–1950)
- Midland Province (1950)
- North Province
- North-East Province (1897)
- South-East Province
- South Province (1900)
- South-West Province
- Suburban Province (1950)
- West Province

The Constitution Acts Amendment Act (No.2) 1963, effective from the 1965 state election, abolished the ten existing three-member provinces, replacing them with 15 two-member provinces. One new province was added at the 1977 state election. Some of the new provinces bore the same names as the previous provinces.

- Central Province
- East Metropolitan Province (1977)
- Lower Central Province
- Lower North Province
- Lower West Province
- Metropolitan Province
- North-East Metropolitan Province
- North-Central Metropolitan Province
- North Metropolitan Province
- North Province
- South-East Province
- South-East Metropolitan Province
- South Metropolitan Province
- South Province
- South-West Province
- Upper West Province
- West Province

=== 1989–2025: Electoral regions ===
The Acts Amendment (Electoral Reform) Act 1987, which took effect at the 1989 state election, created six electoral regions to replace the previous electoral provinces. Initially, the South West and North Metropolitan regions each returned seven members, while the other regions each returned five. This arrangement was changed to have each region return six members for the 2008 state election.

- Agricultural
- East Metropolitan
- Mining and Pastoral
- North Metropolitan
- South Metropolitan
- South West

The historical six regions of the Western Australian Legislative Council

=== From 2025: State-wide electorate ===
After the 2021 state election, in which the Labor Party won a majority in both houses of parliament, the state government formed a commission to explore reform to the Legislative Council electoral system. The committee recommended the abolition of the six electoral regions in favour of a single state-wide electorate and the abolition of group voting tickets, among other changes. The Constitutional and Electoral Legislation Amendment (Electoral Equality) Act 2021 (No. 20) was passed in November 2021 and established a "one vote, one value" system in the Legislative Council for the first time. The electoral regions were abolished and replaced by a single state-wide electorate of 37 members, while GVTs were replaced by optional preferential voting. The changes took effect in the 2025 state election. Voters were required to vote for one or more preferred parties above the dividing line on the ballot paper, or at least 20 candidates below the dividing line.

== See also ==
- 2025 Western Australian state election
- Members of the Western Australian Legislative Council
- Parliaments of the Australian states and territories
