= Six hungry families =

Political families in colonial Western Australia

Six hungry families was a phrase used in the 1880s and 1890s to describe six of the most prominent and powerful families in colonial Western Australia, with extensive influence in judicial, political, mercantile and social circles. It was first used by John Horgan during his unsuccessful 1886 campaign for election to the Western Australian Legislative Council.

Horgan used the phrase to imply that the families were hungry for more wealth, power, influence and land, and that this was at the expense of the working class. He was later successfully sued for libel by George Walpole Leake, a member of one of the "six hungry families", and fined £500, equivalent to A$77,900 in 2022.

Roughly speaking, the "six hungry families" were:

- Leake
- Stone
- Lee Steere
- Shenton
- Lefroy
- Burt

However, there was extensive intermarriage between these and other influential families, and a person could be a member of one or more of these families without possessing any of the six surnames. Essentially, the term six hungry families referred to a single nebulous class of colonists, rather than six distinct families.

Prominent members of the "six hungry families" included:

- Leake family:
  - George Walpole Leake
  - George Leake
  - Luke Leake
- Stone family:
  - Alfred Hawes Stone
  - Edward Albert Stone
  - Frank Mends Stone
  - George Frederick Stone
  - Patrick Stone
- Lee Steere family:
  - James George Lee Steere
  - Ernest Augustus Lee Steere
- Shenton family:
  - Arthur Shenton
  - Edward Shenton
  - Ernest Shenton
  - George Shenton Sr
  - George Shenton
  - William Kernott Shenton
- Lefroy family
  - Anthony O'Grady Lefroy
  - Edward Lefroy
  - Gerald de Courcy Lefroy
  - Henry Lefroy
- Burt family
  - Archibald Burt
  - Francis Burt
  - Septimus Burt
  - Octavius Burt

== General references ==
- Stannage, Charles Thomas (1979). The People of Perth: A Social History of Western Australia's Capital City. Perth: Perth City Council. ISBN 0-909994-86-2.
- "The Six Hungry Families". Constitutional Centre of Western Australia, Government of Western Australia.

== Sources ==
- Stannage, Tom (1983). "John Horgan (1834–1907)". Australian Dictionary of Biography. Vol. 9. National Centre of Biography, Australian National University. ISBN 978-0-522-84459-7. ISSN 1833-7538. OCLC 70677943.
- "Mr. Horgan at the Canning". The West Australian. Vol. 2, no. 135. Western Australia. 9 June 1886. p. 3 – via National Library of Australia.
- "Mr. Horgan Before the Electors of Perth". The West Australian. Vol. 4, no. 682. Western Australia. 19 May 1888. p. 3 – via National Library of Australia.
- "The Perth Election". The West Australian. Vol. 4, no. 690. Western Australia. 29 May 1888. p. 3 – via National Library of Australia.
- "Mr. Horgan at the Canning". Western Mail. Vol. 1, no. 26. Western Australia. 12 June 1886. p. 22 – via National Library of Australia.
