= George Leake (disambiguation) =

George Leake (1856–1902) was Premier of Western Australia and son of George Walpole Leake.

George Leake may also refer to:

- George Leake (merchant) (1786–1849), director of the Bank of Western Australia and chairman of the Perth Town Trust
- George Walpole Leake (1825–1895), barrister and magistrate and nephew of George Leake (1786–1849)

== See also ==
- Leake family tree
