= Timeline of banking in Western Australia =

The first commercial bank in Western Australia was created eight years after the establishment of the Swan River Colony in 1829.

Entries in italics indicate a locally (Western Australian) domiciled operation.

Early 1830s	Colonial Secretary of Western Australia, Peter Broun, begins a makeshift banking service out of necessity, despite having no training in finance or accounting. It collapses in 1835.
June 1837	Bank of Western Australia is established by prominent local businessmen including George Leake as its first chairman
1841	Bank of Western Australia is sold to the Bank of Australasia
1841	Western Australia Bank is established
1845	Original Bank of Western Australia closes
1855	Government savings bank opens
1863	Post Office Savings Bank opens
1862	Perth Building Society opens
1866	Branch of National Bank of Australasia opens
1878	Branch of Union Bank of Australia opens
1883	Branch of Bank of New South Wales opens
1888	Branch of Commercial Bank of Australia opens
1895	Government of Western Australia establishes the Agricultural Bank of Western Australia
1927	Western Australian Bank acquired by Bank of New South Wales
1945	Agricultural Bank renamed to Rural & Industries Bank
1964	Town & Country Building Society established
1983	Western Australian Building Society agrees to merger with the Town & Country Building Society on 27 April 1983
1987	Perth Building Society merges with Hotham Building Society to form Challenge Bank
1990	Town & Country Building Society acquired by ANZ Bank
1994	Rural & Industries Bank renamed Bankwest
1995	Challenge Bank acquired by Westpac
1995	Bank of Scotland acquired Bankwest, and as part of the sale agreement, offered 49 per cent of the shares in BankWest to the public. BankWest shares listed on the Australian Securities Exchange on 1 February 1996.
2001	Halifax merged with Bank of Scotland to form HBOS. HBOS then acquired all the outstanding shares of Bankwest, making it HBOS's wholly owned subsidiary
2008	Commonwealth Bank acquires Bankwest from HBOS for $2.1bn, fallout from the 2008 financial crisis
