= Bank of Melbourne =

Bank of Melbourne can refer to:

- Bank of Melbourne (1989), the original bank, taken over by Westpac in 1997
- Bank of Melbourne (2011), the subsidiary of Westpac launched in 2011
