= Bicton, Western Australia =

Bicton
- Suburb
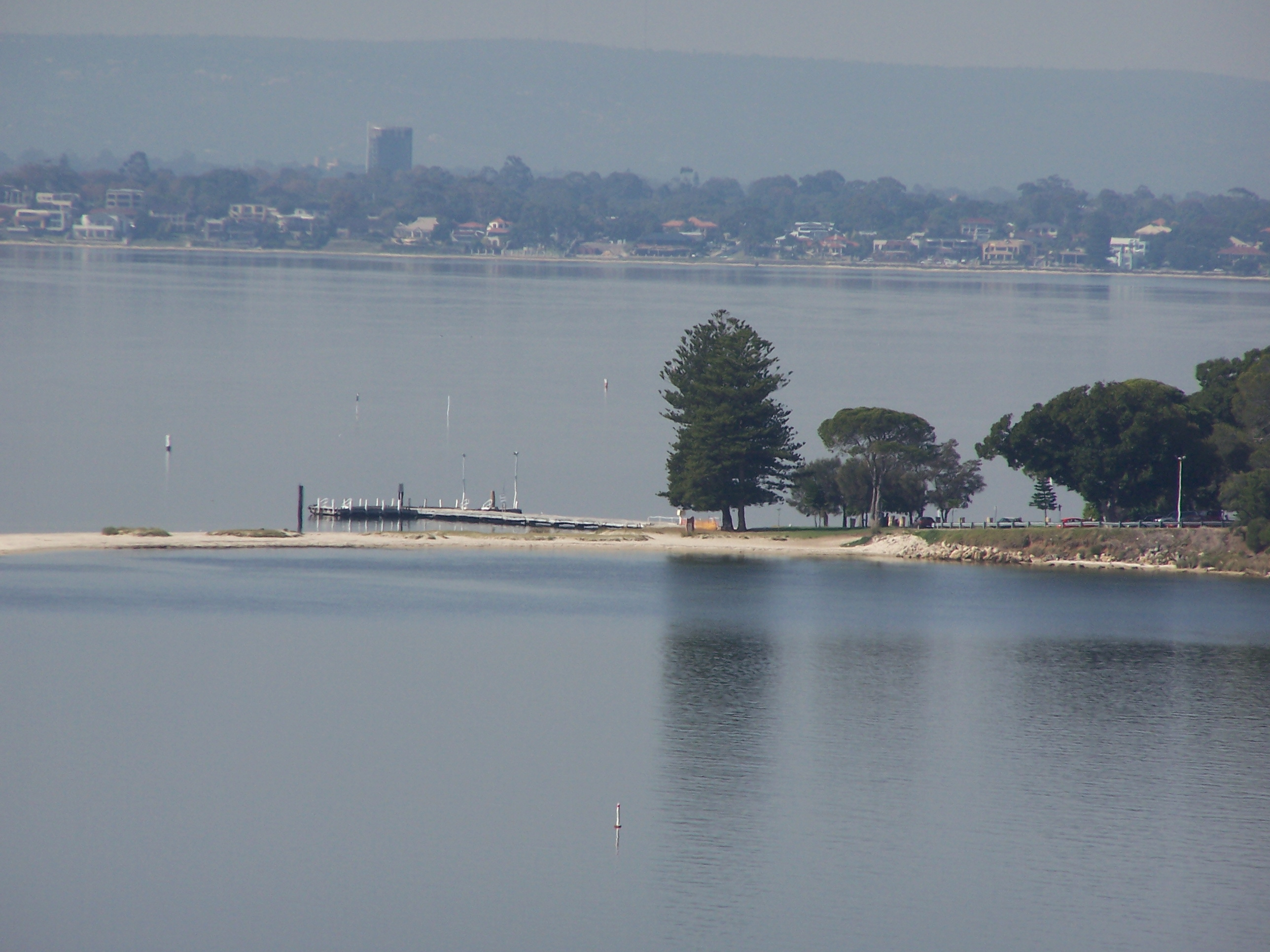
- View of Point Walter Reserve, Bicton
- Interactive map of Bicton
- Coordinates: 32°01′35″S 115°47′09″E
- Country: Australia
- State: Western Australia
- City: Perth
- LGA: City of Melville
- Location: 15 km (9.3 mi) from Perth
- Established: 1830s

Government
  - State electorate: Bicton
  - Federal division: Tangney

Area
  - Total: 3.2 km^{2} (1.2 sq mi)

Population
  - Total: 6,961 (SAL 2021)
- Postcode: 6157
Suburbs around Bicton
| Swan River | Swan River | Swan River |
| East Fremantle | Bicton | Attadale |
| East Fremantle | Palmyra | Melville |

Bicton is an affluent riverside suburb of Perth, Western Australia, located 10 kilometres (6.2 mi) south-west of the central business district. The suburb is mostly residential, and falls within the City of Melville local government area. Bicton borders the Swan River to the north, with the northern third of the suburb taken up by a Class-A reserve at Point Walter.

Originally settled in the 1830s, when a large vineyard was established, Bicton was mainly rural until the subdivision of the former Bicton Racecourse, beginning in 1919. Further subdivisions of the Castle Hill area in 1921 established the suburb as a middle-class area of Fremantle. Bicton underwent further expansion after the conclusion of World War II. Now with a large demographic of business owners and high net worth individuals, Bicton is considered one of the most affluent riverside suburbs in Perth.

== History ==
Prior to European settlement, the Beeliar subgroup of the Noongar Aboriginal people obtained food and drinking water from the river edges and open grassy areas. The sandbar at Point Walter was used as one of the few river crossing between the mouth of the river and The Narrows. The area around Point Walter was known as Dyoondalu in the local language, meaning 'place of white sand', and featured in local creation myths. The area along the East Fremantle and Bicton foreshores, extending into Blackwall Reach, was called Quaada gabee, meaning 'beautiful water', and included a number of freshwater springs.

The Swan River Colony was declared by Charles Fremantle in April 1829, however, Bicton was not settled until 1830, when four land grants were given to John Hole Duffield, who had arrived on Warrior in March 1830, Alfred Waylen, Joseph Cooper and William Hapgood. The area was named after the village of Bicton in East Devon, where Duffield had previously had an estate. Duffield planted the colony's first commercially-operating vineyard, comprising 5,700 vines, in 1845. His son, James Hole Duffield, and another worker, John Luff, died on 30 March 1860 after they were buried alive in what the Perth Gazette called "a lamentable accident" while attempting to sink a well on Duffield's property.

The Bicton Racecourse was established in 1904 on land leased by the Higham family after the closure of the South Fremantle Racecourse. The course was closed in 1917 after the passing of the WA Racing Restrictions Act. The former racecourse was subdivided into suburban blocks in 1919, and the Castle Hill area, close to Point Walter, was subdivided in 1921 by Gold Estates. Further development occurred after the conclusion of World War II.

== Geography and geology ==
Bicton is bounded by Petra Street to the west, Stock Road to the east, Canning Highway to the south and the Swan River to the north (Melville Water) and northwest (Blackwall Reach). Apart from the reserve and golf course at Point Walter, almost all of Bicton is residential. Bicton is one of the most hilly coastal suburbs of Perth, with Castle Hill the most prominent hill. The suburb has several beaches, most notably at Bicton Baths, Point Walter and along the Bicton foreshore. The suburb lies on the Swan Coastal Plain. Much of Bicton is situated on limestone base-rock, with the cliffs at Blackwall Reach composed entirely of limestone. Many houses, especially those built around the turn of the 19th and 20th centuries, were built on limestone foundations quarried from Bicton. Bicton's soil is generally sandy and infertile.

== Swan River ==
The Bicton foreshore has been a popular place for families to visit. Barely 20 metres (66 ft) from Bicton Baths is a grass area with a square jetty that is a popular destination for swimming, fishing and other water activities.

== Facilities ==
The Melville Water Polo Club and Bicton Swimming Club are based at Bicton Pool overlooking the river, which was established as a baths in 1926 by the swimming club. Two teams competing in the Australian National Water Polo League, the Fremantle Mariners (men's), and the Fremantle Marlins (women's), play their home games at the pool. The Tom Hoad Cup, an international water polo tournament, has been held yearly since 2003 at the pool. A cricket club, the Bicton Junior Cricket Club, was originally formed for school- and church-run competitions around 1923. The club is currently based at Troy Park in Attadale but still plays occasional games at Bicton Primary School.

Three shopping facilities are located in the suburb, as well as a strip mall extending along most of Canning Highway. Two churches – St. Christophers Anglican Church and Bicton Presbyterian Church – are located within the borders of Bicton, while the Bicton Uniting Church is located in the neighbouring suburb of Palmyra. Three aged care facilities – Carinya of Bicton, Braemar Lodge and Craigview Grove – are located in Bicton. The Bicton-Palmyra subchapter of the Returned and Services League (RSL) is located on Foss Street. The Leopold Hotel is located on the corner of Point Walter Road and Canning Highway, and was listed on the Statewide Hotel Survey undertaken by the Heritage Council of Western Australia in 1999. There are also a number of residences, facilities and reserves listed with the Heritage Council. A quarantine station operated by the Australian Quarantine and Inspection Service, Fremantle Quarantine Station, opened in 1916 to service the port of Fremantle. The station close in 1983, moving to Byford, with part of the land being subdivided and the rest becoming the Quarantine Park, with the jetty converted to use for recreational purposes.

There are five public parks operated by the City of Melville located in Bicton: Bicton Quarantine Park, Fred Jones Reserve, Harry Grose Reserve, John Dickinson Reserve, and Rod Campbell Park, as well as reserves located at Bicton Baths (including Bicton Pool), Blackwall Reach and Point Walter. An eight-hole golf course, Point Walter Golf Course, and tennis courts, are also located at Point Walter. The suburb also includes several playgrounds and bicycle and walking paths along the shores of the Swan River.

== Education ==
The suburb contains one state-run primary school, Bicton Primary School, established in 1904 and located on View Terrace. As of semester one, 2011, the school has a total enrolment of 410 students, consisting of 40 kindergarten, 54 pre-primary, and 316 primary students. Bicton is occasionally used by the local community, and shares the hosting of an annual fête with other local schools. The school is located within the catchment area of Melville Senior High School, having previously fallen within the John Curtin College of the Arts catchment area. Bicton Primary School is used as a polling booth by the Western Australian Electoral Commission for both state and federal elections. A small tornado in May 2005 caused significant damage in the Bicton area, causing A$6 million damage to the school. This resulted in the closure of the school for four weeks.

== Transport ==
Canning Highway, running between Fremantle and The Causeway in Victoria Park, makes up the southern border of the suburb. Other major roads include Petra Street, making up the western border, Stock Road, making up the eastern border, and Preston Point Road, running through the suburb. Bicton is served by the 148 and 158 Transperth bus routes from Fremantle station, as well as services along Canning Highway, the 910 (previously the 106) and the 111. The 765 school special runs through Bicton during the school term. All services are operated by Swan Transit.

A tramway network, Fremantle Municipal Tramways, operated a branch line to Point Walter between 1915 and 1939, by way of Canning Road and Point Walter Road. The opening of this line helped to develop Point Walter into a popular resort and place of entertainment. Along with the trams came electric lighting, and, soon afterwards, shops and restaurants. Entertainment at Point Walter included McNamara's Band, and panoramic views of the Swan River.

== Politics ==
Bicton has one polling booth in federal and state elections, located at Bicton Primary School. At federal level, Bicton is located within the Division of Tangney. At state level, Bicton is located in the district of Bicton, which was created for the 2017 state election. In the Western Australian Legislative Council, Bicton falls into the electoral region of South Metropolitan. At local government level, Bicton is part of the Bicton-Attadale Ward of the City of Melville, along with Attadale. Bicton-Attadale elects two councillors, currently June Barton (term expiring 2013) and Susanne Taylor-Rees (term expiring 2015).

== Photo gallery ==
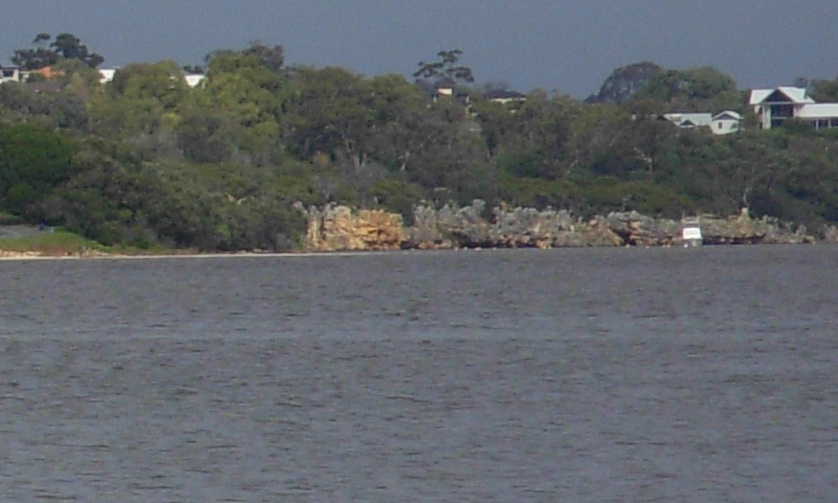
Blackwall Reach cliffs viewed from Freshwater Bay, Claremont

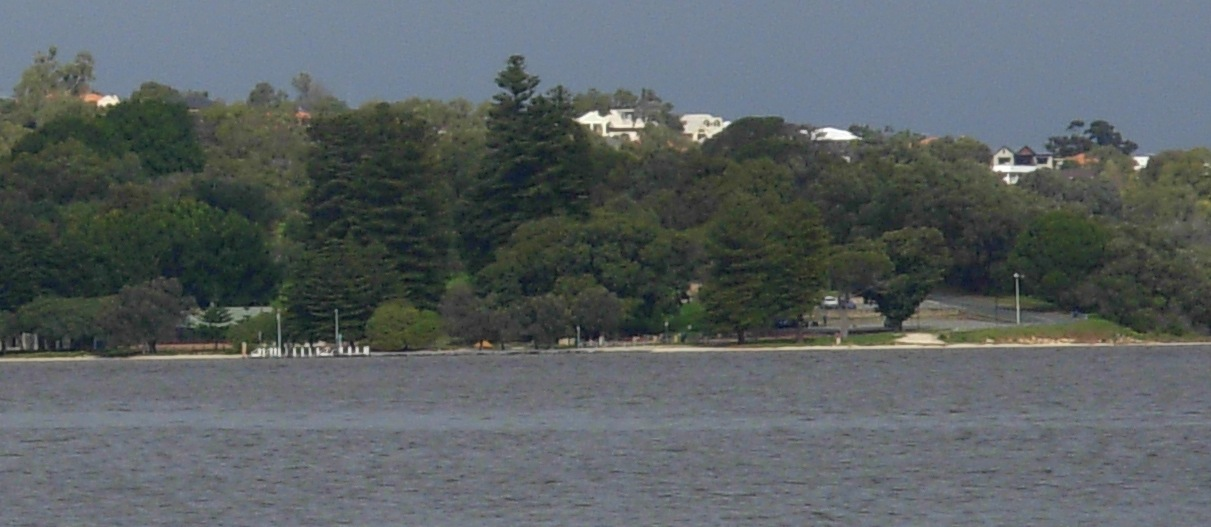
Port Walter viewed from Freshwater Bay, Claremont

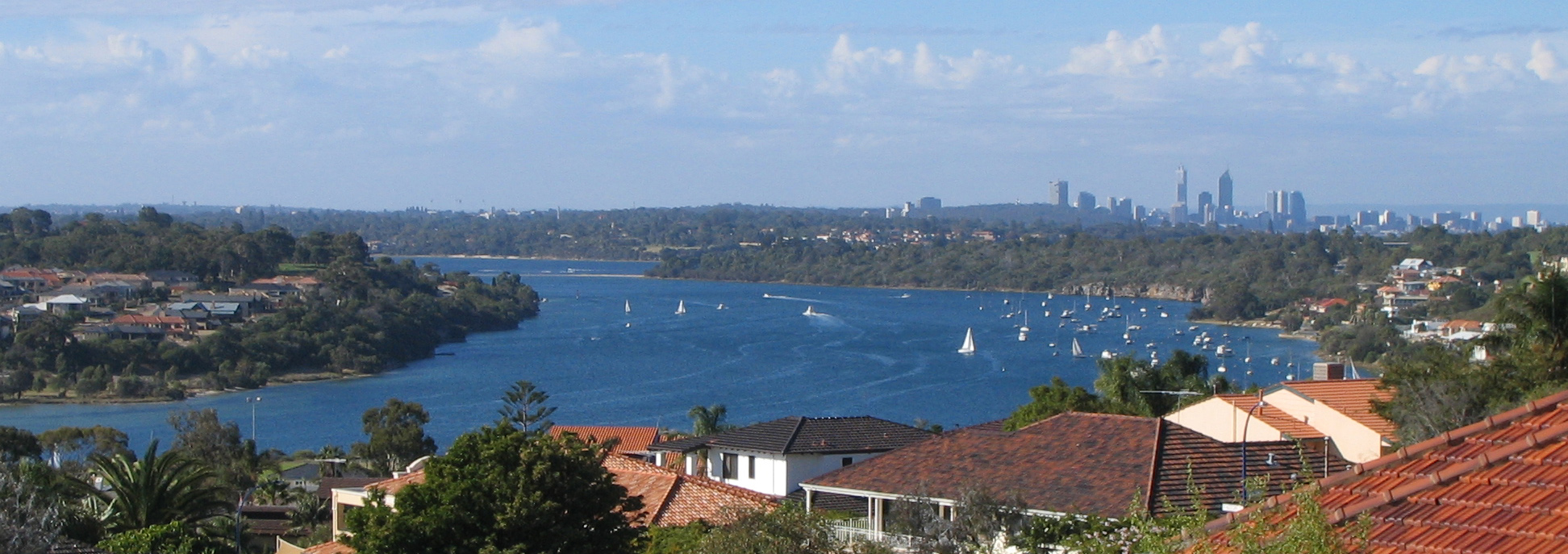
View from East Fremantle of Bicton's Blackwall Reach and Point Walter

== See also ==
- Electoral district of Bicton
