= Blackwall Reach (disambiguation) =

Blackwall Reach may refer to:

- Blackwall Reach (Western Australia) - a section of the Swan River in Western Australia
- Blackwall Reach, a section of the River Thames in London
- Blackwall Reach development, a regeneration scheme in East London
