= John Horgan (Australian politician) =

Australian politician

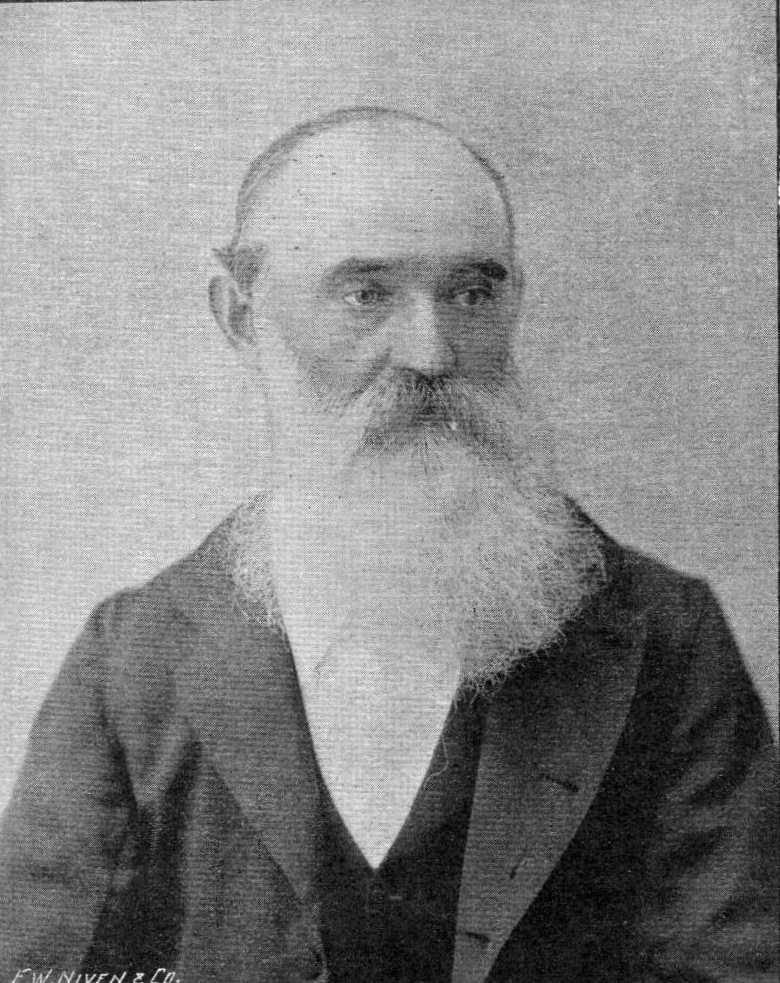
- Born: 15 July 1834; Macroom, County Cork, Ireland
- Died: 8 July 1907 (aged 72); Perth, Western Australia
- Education: Dr. Moynihan's Collegiate School
- Occupations: Lawyer; Politician
- Spouses: Mary Ann Oliff; Mary Ann (Marion) Coffey
- Children: 12

John William Horgan (15 July 1834 – 8 July 1907) was a Member of the Western Australian Legislative Council in 1888–89. He is remembered most for his aggressive election campaigns in which he characterised six of the most prominent families in colonial Western Australia as the "six hungry families".

== His Life ==
=== Early life ===
John Horgan was born in Macroom, County Cork, Ireland, on 15 July 1834. He was educated at Dr. Moynihan's Collegiate School in Cork.

=== Career ===
In the 1860s and 1870s, he practised as a barrister and solicitor in Cork, becoming honorary secretary of the Cork Law Society. He became active in British politics, campaigning and ultimately successfully securing Joseph Ronayne's election to the House of Commons.

In 1876, he emigrated with his family to New South Wales. For the next five years, he practised law there. During this period, there was constant conflict in the colony over Henry Parkes' plan to introduce free, compulsory, secular education. This was aggressively resisted by Roman Catholics, whose schools would be closed. A devout Catholic, Horgan was against Parkes' plan, and in January 1881, after Parkes' legislation passed, Horgan and his family relocated to Western Australia.

In Western Australia, he turned his energies to improving the standing of the working class. In his work, he took on working men's cases for free, and in 1883–84, he helped secure limited reforms to the Master and Servant Act. In 1886, Horgan, along with Richard "Dickie" Haynes, formed Western Australia's first Eight Hours Association to agitate for the eight-hour day. In May 1886, the Legislative Council's seat of Perth was made vacant by the death of Luke Leake. The following month, a by-election was held for the seat, and Horgan was nominated. His platform was radical for its time; he advocated responsible government, payment of members, manhood suffrage, a land tax, and a unicameral legislature. He was an aggressive critic of the Government and the colony's powerful ruling elite. It was during this campaign that Horgan first characterised the colony's wealthiest and most powerful families as the "six hungry families", implying that they were hungry for more wealth, power and land. Although Edward Scott easily won the seat, Horgan surprised many by taking second place in the poll. Shortly after the election, he was successfully sued for libel by George Walpole Leake, a member of one of the "Six Hungry Families", and fined £500.

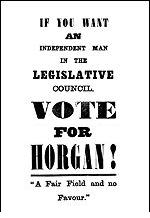
This political advertisement appeared in the W. A. Bulletin on 19 May 1888.

In May 1888, Stephen Henry Parker petitioned for bankruptcy and was therefore obliged to resign his seat in the Legislative Council. Horgan contested the subsequent by-election on a similar platform as previously. He remained a staunch opponent of the Government and was especially critical of Governor Broome, who was seen by many of the working class as overbearing and quarrelsome. To the great surprise of the colony's ruling elite, Horgan defeated his conservative opponent, Septimus Burt, by three votes. Stannage (1979) writes that "Horgan's victory was regarded at the time as a turning point in the history of working men's political activity.... The election had a liberating effect on the minds of the workers, analogous to the victory of Robert Lowe in Sydney forty years previously". Despite the significance of his election, Horgan achieved little in the Legislative Council and held his seat only until the next general election on 22 January 1889, in which Edward Keane defeated him. From 1890, he practised in partnership with Frederick Moorhead, and later with M.G. Lavan.

=== Personal life ===
He married Mary Ann Oliff (née Horan) in 1861; they had twelve children. She died in August 1889. In February 1891, he married Mary Ann (Marion) Coffey.

He died in Perth on 8 July 1907 and was buried at East Perth Cemetery.
