= Julian Carr (politician) =

Australian politician (1824 – 1886)

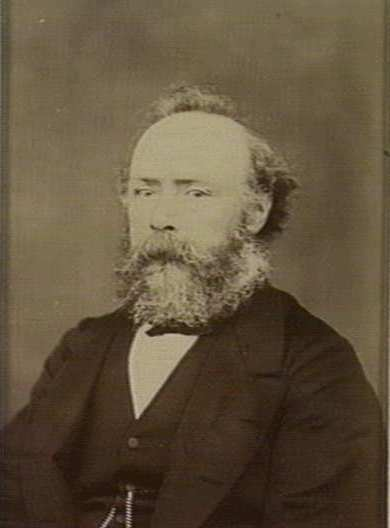
Julian Carr

Julian George Charles Carr (c. 1824–5 February 1886) was a Member of the Western Australian Legislative Council from 1868 to 1873.

The son of William Carr, gentleman, Julian Carr was born in England around 1824. Nothing is known of his early life, but on 11 May 1846 he married Katherine Agnes Francisco, a cousin of Sir Walter James, at St. George's Church, Bloomsbury, Middlesex. At the time of his marriage, Carr was living in Museum Street in London, and described as a gentleman. His marriage certificate lists his first name as Julienn.

Carr and his wife emigrated to Western Australia, arriving in March 1848 on board the Orient. Carr established himself as a merchant at Perth, and by 1849 was proprietor of the Freemason's Hotel there. The following year he was a director of the Geraldine Mining Company. He was elected Chairman of the Perth Municipal Council in 1861, a position that he would hold until 1869 except for a short break in 1864–5. He also became heavily involved in the founding of the Perth Building Society; he was a founding trustee in 1862, remaining so until 1873. In 1866 he was appointed a director, and he held its chairmanship from 1867 to 1873. He was also a founding director of the Western Australia Fire Insurance Company in 1870, and a member of the Central Board of Education until 1873.

In May 1868, Carr was nominated to the Legislative Council. He held the position until the advent of representative government in 1870. He was then elected to the Legislative Council for the seat of Perth holding it until his resignation around November 1873. During this time he was the Council's Chairman of Committees from December 1870 to July 1873. After resigning his positions, Carr returned permanently to England. Nothing is known of his later life, except that he died at Upper Tooting, London, on 5 February 1886.
