= Keith Watson (politician) =

Australian politician

Sir Keith Watson
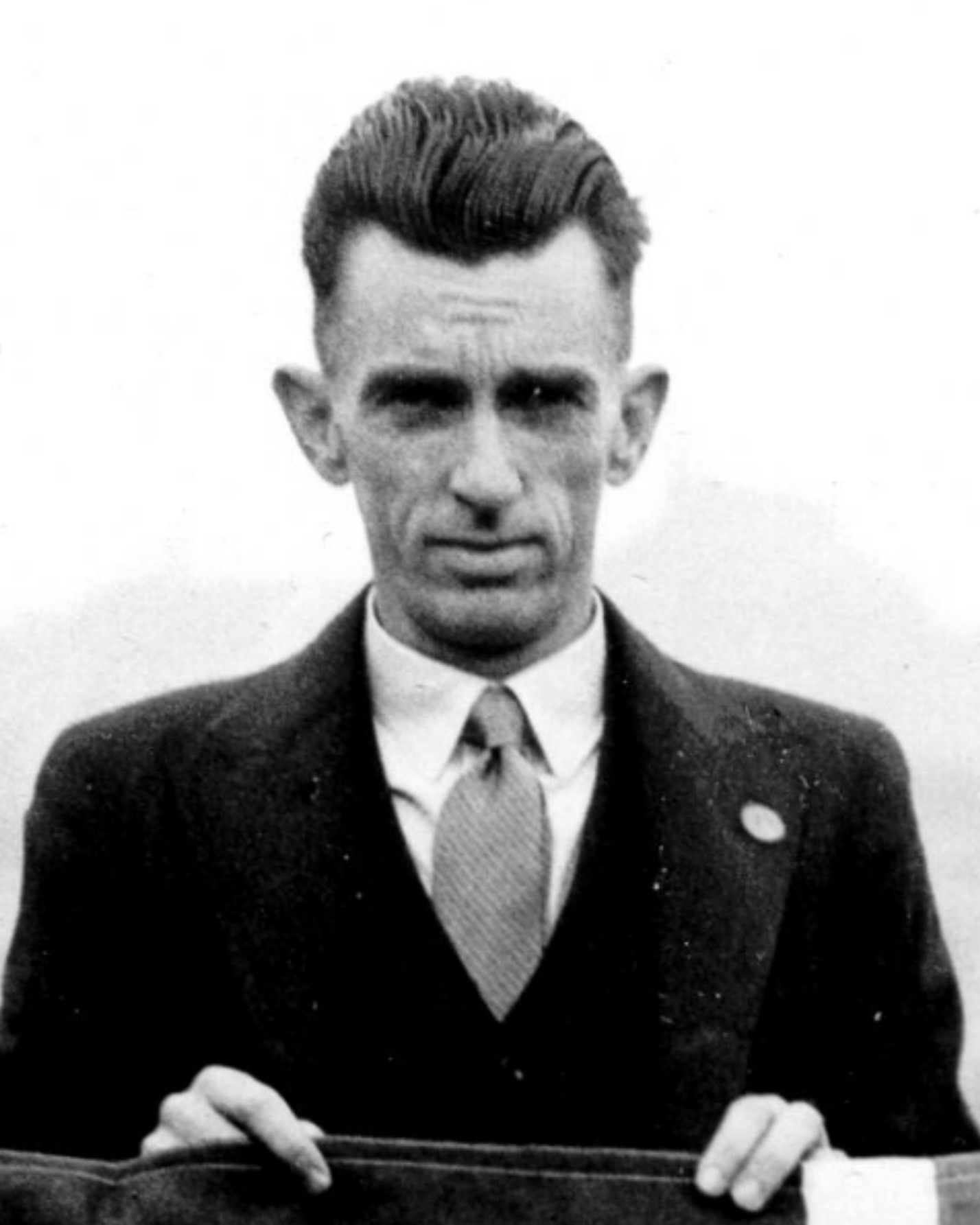
- Watson in 1934

Member of the Western Australian Legislative Council
- In office 8 May 1948 – 21 May 1968
- Constituency: Metropolitan Province

Personal details
- Born: Henry Keith Watson; 22 August 1900 Southern Cross, Western Australia, Australia
- Died: 13 January 1973 (aged 72) Bentley, Western Australia, Australia
- Party: Nationalist (to 1945); Liberal (from 1945)
- Spouse: Edith Symonds (m. 1926)
- Occupation: Accountant; Company director

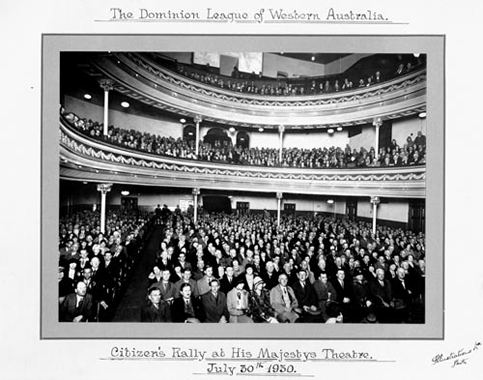
Public launch of the Dominion League at His Majesty's Theatre, Perth on 30 July 1930

Sir Henry Keith Watson (22 August 1900 – 13 January 1973) was an Australian businessman and politician. He was a leader of the Western Australian secession movement in the 1930s, holding office in the Dominion League of Western Australia. He was a prominent campaigner in the 1933 secession referendum and served on the delegation to the British parliament which ultimately failed to achieve the movement's aims. Watson later represented the Liberal Party in the Western Australian Legislative Council from 1948 to 1968. He was a tax accountant by profession and a long-serving chairman of the Perth Building Society.

== Early life ==
Watson was born on 22 August 1900 in Southern Cross, Western Australia. He was the son of Martha Elizabeth (née Smith) and William Henry Watson. He moved to Perth as a child, attending state schools in Cottesloe and Claremont. He left school at the age of 14 to work as a messenger boy for a solicitor's firm. In 1919, Watson passed an examination to join the Commonwealth Public Service as a clerk in the Postmaster-General's Department, later transferring to the Federal Taxation Office.

== Business career ==
Watson resigned from the public service in 1921 to enter into private practice as a tax accountant. In the 1920s he was managing director of Rowdell Ltd, a taxation consulting firm. In 1930, a two-year legal battle against the federal government over a tax debt ended when his final appeal was rejected by the High Court of Australia in Watson v Commissioner of Taxation.

Watson was elected an associate of the Institute of Incorporated Secretaries in 1929 and a fellow in 1946. He had a long association with the Perth Building Society, serving as a director from 1932 to 1972, as chairman from 1951 to 1971 and as state president of the Association of Permanent Building Societies from 1951 to 1969. He was also WA chairman of flour milling firm W. Thomas & Co. (1950–1963) and a director of the Western Australian Insurance Co. Ltd (1949–1960), Western Press Ltd. (1951–1955) and George Weston Foods Ltd. (1967–1970).

== Politics ==
=== Federal politics ===
Watson was an unsuccessful candidate for the House of Representatives on three occasions, standing in the seat of Fremantle at the 1928, 1929 and 1931 federal elections. He was the endorsed Nationalist candidate against John Curtin in 1929 and stood as independent Nationalists at the other two contests.

=== Secession movement ===
In 1930, Watson became one of the co-founders of the pro-secession Dominion League first as its treasurer and later as secretary. Watson launched the League's public campaign at His Majesty's Theatre, Perth on 30 July 1930.

He promoted the League through a campaign of pamphlets, newspaper articles and letters to the editors of the major newspapers promoting secession ideals and the need for a referendum on the issue. The campaign ultimately resulted in a 1933 referendum which was won by a two-thirds majority YES vote, largely as a result of his enthusiastic campaigning.

Oddly, the pro-secessionist Nationalist Party was voted out in the State election which was held at the same time and the new Labor Government headed by new Premier Philip Collier had campaigned to support the retention of the State in the Federation. Collier managed to dither with a decision on the secession question until 1934 when he appointed a delegation to present the secession petition to London. Watson joined the delegation with Sir Hal Colebatch, Matthew Moss and James MacCallum Smith (MLA and proprietor of The Sunday Times newspaper). They returned to Perth in 1935 frustrated at the British Parliament's refusal to accept the petition and by 1938 the Dominion League had become inactive.

=== Later activities ===
In the 1948 elections, Watson was elected as a Member of the Legislative Council for the Metropolitan Province. The seat was previously held by L. B. Bolton who had deceased. He served in the parliament for the next twenty years until his retirement in 1968 when he was created a Knight Bachelor.

In 1933 Watson was made a vice-president of the National Party (the forerunner to the Liberal Party) and to the Liberal Party in 1948.

== Personal life ==
Watson married Edith Wilson Symonds in 1926, with whom he had one son and two daughters. He died in Bentley, Western Australia, on 13 January 1973, aged 72, having been predeceased by his daughters.
