= Alfred Waylen =

Western Australian surgeon and winemaker

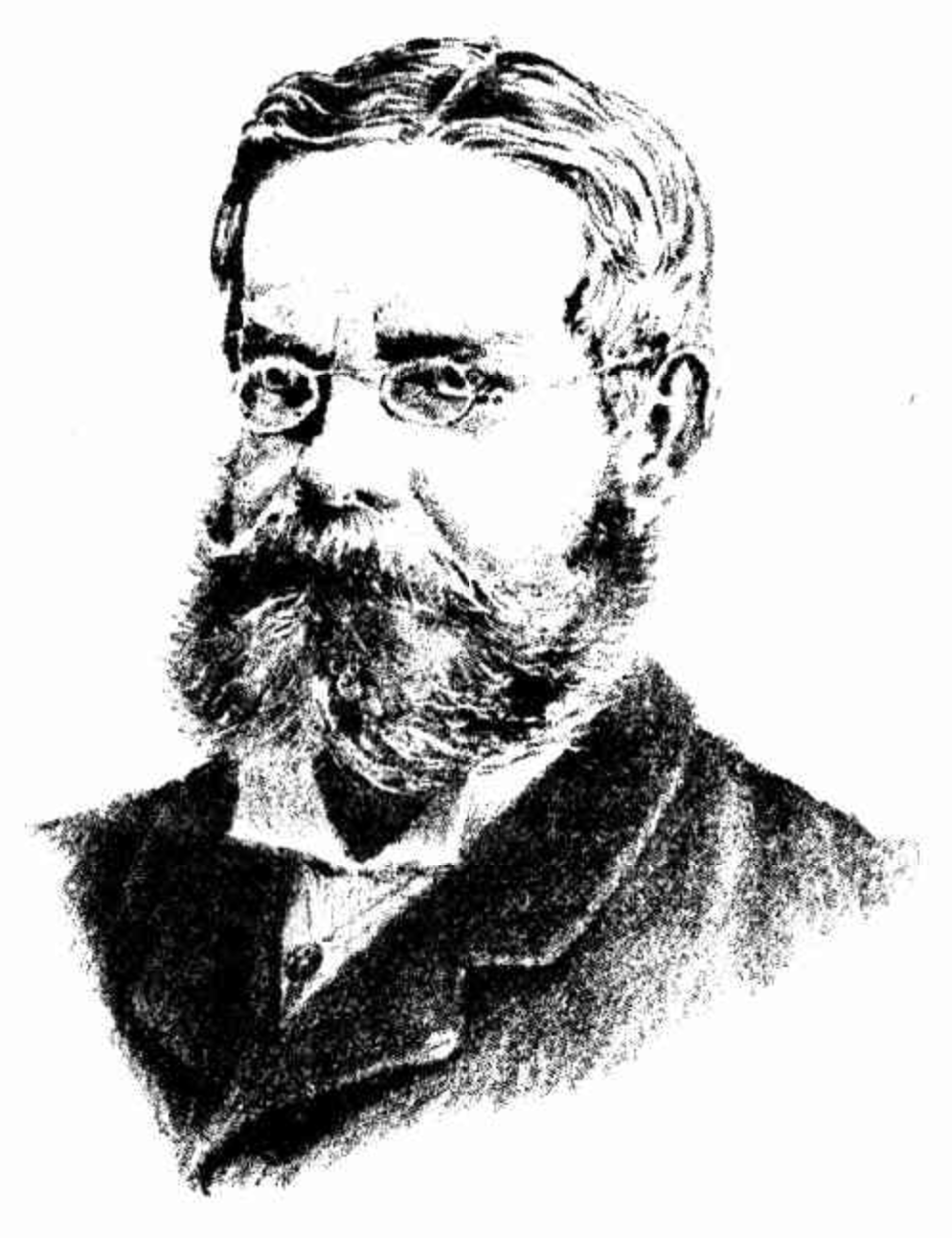
Alfred Waylen in 1887

Alfred Robert Waylen (1833 – 10 January 1901) was a Western Australian surgeon and winemaker. He was born at Point Walter, Western Australia, to Alfred Waylen and his wife, née Bailey, who had arrived at the Swan River Colony aboard Skerne in 1830.

He qualified as M.R.C.S. Eng., L.S.A. (London) and L.Mid.R.C.S. Eng. in 1856, and entered the colonial service in April 1859 as a medical officer in the Swan district. Waylen was then in the imperial medical service in charge of the Guildford convict depot and out-stations for sixteen years. He was appointed colonial surgeon in August 1873, medical officer of Perth prison in 1876, and was also president of the Medical Board and of the Central Board of Health.

In 1887 he married Louisa, daughter of reverend Thomas Henry Walpole, vicar of Winslow, Bucks, and widow of Luke Leake. Waylen, who was an M.D. of Melbourne, a justice of the peace of Western Australia, and a member of the Perth Commission for the Colonial and Indian Exhibition, visited England in 1890.

He was a pioneer of the wine industry in Western Australia, starting a winery in Darlington. Waylen died childless in Guildford on 10 January 1901.
