= Bicton Baths =

Swimming location in Perth, Western Australia

- Kwoppa Kepa
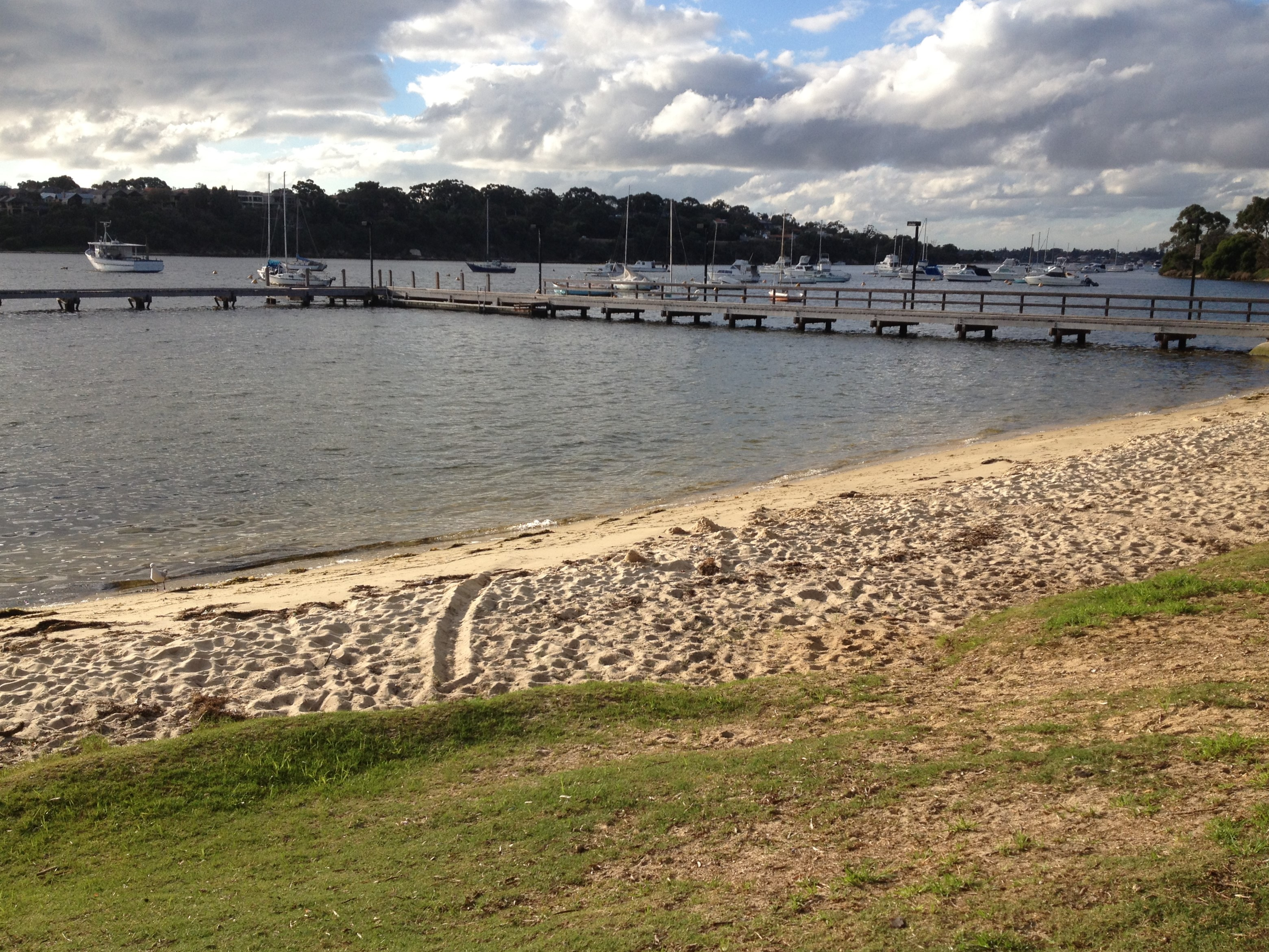
- View of Bicton Baths in May 2016

- Location within Perth
- Interactive map of Bicton Baths
- Location: Swan River, Western Australia
- Coordinates: 32.028136°S 115.777419°E
- Type: Tidal gorge
- Max. length: 52 m (171 ft)
- Max. width: 55 m (180 ft)
- Shore length^{1}: 71 m (233 ft)
- ^{1} Shore length is not a well-defined measure.

Bicton Baths is a popular swimming location on the Swan River in Bicton, Western Australia, commonly used by for prawn hunting, diving training, swimming, sport, leisure and annual events.

Formally known as Bicton River Jetty and as Jetty 1248, it is known to the local Aboriginal people, the Whadjuk Noongar people, as Kwoppa Kepa, meaning 'beautiful water' in Noongar.

Bicton Baths were initiated by the local Melville Amateur Swimming Club, a group who had previously utilised the jetty of the quarantine station as a platform. In 1946 the Melville Water Polo Club was founded at the baths, a move which resulted in the Bicton Pool being built in 1979.

The baths themselves consist of a wooden U-shaped jetty which contains exit ladders. Bicton Baths is located in a tidal gorge and is heavily influenced by ocean water inflow. It contains a variety of wildlife, including algae, anemones, crabs, dolphins, fish, nudibranchs, shrimp, sponges and starfish.
