= Electoral district of Perth (Legislative Council) =

Former electoral district of Perth, Western Australia

Perth Western Australia—Legislative Council
- State: Western Australia
- Dates current: 1870–1890
- Namesake: Perth

Perth was an electoral district of the Legislative Council of Western Australia from 1870 to 1890, during the period when the Legislative Council was the sole chamber of the Parliament of Western Australia.

Perth was one of the original ten Legislative Council districts created by the Legislative Council Act 1870 (33 Vict, No. 13). The district's southern boundary ran along the Swan River, the Canning River, and Bull Creek (although North Fremantle was assigned to the district of Fremantle). It then ran south-east out to near present-day Ashendon, before going north-east to Mount Dale, which was the easternmost point within the district. Perth's northern boundary ran north-west from Mount Dale to Belmont (on the Swan River), then north by west to Lake Gnangara, and finally north to a due east line intersecting Nowergup Lake. The district was bordered by the district of Swan to the north and east, the district of Murray and Williams to the south-east (after 1873), and the district of Fremantle to the south.

Along with Fremantle and the North District (from 1883 only), Perth elected two members to the Legislative Council (unlike the other constituencies, which only elected one member each). In total, eight men represented the district between 1870 and 1890, the longest-serving of which was Sir Luke Leake (from 1870 to 1886). Several of the district's representatives went on to serve in the Legislative Assembly after the advent of responsible government in 1890.

== Members ==
Two members
Member	Party	Term	Member	Party	Term
Julien Carr	None	1870–1873	Sir Luke Leake	None	1870–1886
Edmund Birch	None	1873–1875	Sir Luke Leake	None	1870–1886
George Randell	None	1875–1878	Sir Luke Leake	None	1870–1886
Stephen Henry Parker	None	1878–1888	Sir Luke Leake	None	1870–1886
Stephen Henry Parker	None	1878–1888	Edward Scott	None	1886–1890
John Horgan	None	1888–1889	Edward Scott	None	1886–1890
Edward Vivien Harvey Keane	None	1889–1890	Edward Scott	None	1886–1890
