= Bank of Melbourne (2011) =

Australian banking institution

- Type: Subsidiary
- Industry: Banking, Financial services
- Predecessor: Bank of Melbourne (1989)
- Founded: 11 March 2011
- Headquarters: Melbourne, Australia
- Number of locations: 3 (22 May 2026)
- Area served: Victoria, Australia
- Key people: Elizabeth Proust (Chairman); Mark Melvin (Chief Executive)
- Products: Personal Banking, Business Banking
- Parent: Westpac
- Website: www.bankofmelbourne.com.au

The Bank of Melbourne is a financial institution operating in Victoria, Australia. A subsidiary of Westpac, it commenced operations on 11 March 2011.

The Bank of Melbourne initially rebadged the Victorian business of St George Bank, another wholly owned subsidiary of Westpac, as part of a major local branding strategy. The customer-facing activities of the business operate independently of Westpac. Westpac has owned the Bank of Melbourne, and the rights to the brand, since its acquisition of the bank in 1997.

== History ==
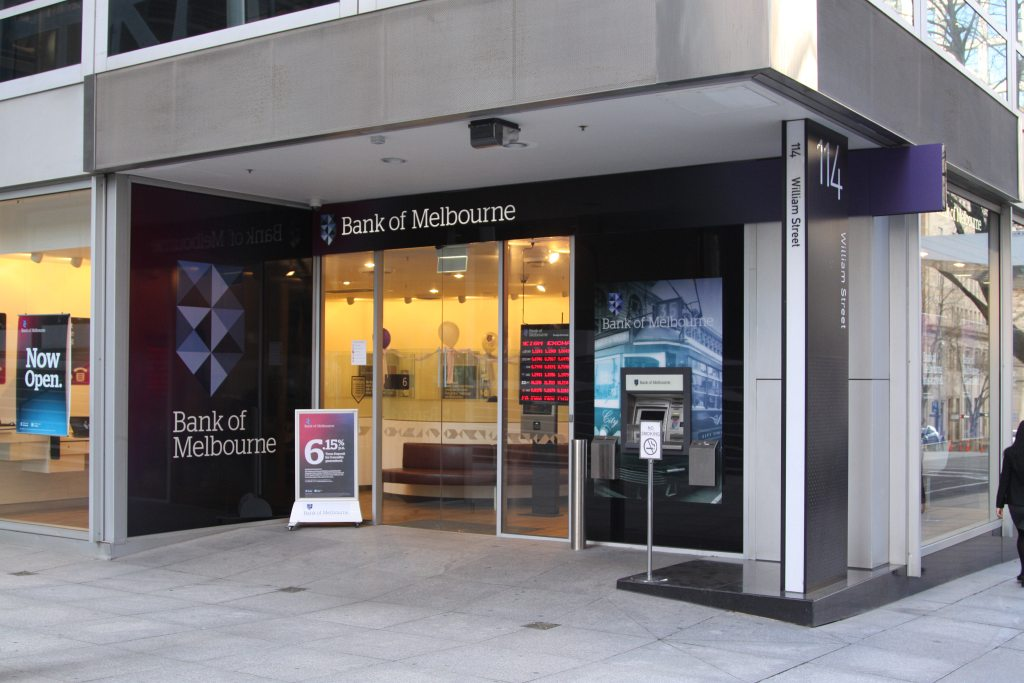
Bank of Melbourne branch on William Street, Melbourne in 2011. This branch closed in 2022.

The RESI Statewide Building Society was granted a banking licence and established the Bank of Melbourne in July 1989, listing it on the Australian Securities Exchange on 13 July 1989. In November 1996, the bank acquired the Victorian business of Challenge Bank from Westpac.

On 3 April 1997, Westpac made a $1.43 billion bid to acquire the Bank of Melbourne; on 29 September 1997, holders of 96% of the ordinary shares of the Bank of Melbourne voted to approve the proposal. Conditions of approval for the takeover required Westpac to continue operating the entity as the Bank of Melbourne for three years.

The entity traded under that brand name until January 2004, at which point the brand name was retired and replaced with Westpac. In 2008, Westpac merged with the St George Bank.

In 2011, Westpac relaunched a redesigned Bank of Melbourne brand, trading with the infrastructure and employees of St George Bank in Victoria and led by Chief Executive Scott Tanner. Bank of Melbourne's logo is a navy blue shield, reflecting the architecture of Melbourne and Victoria's state colour. The logo was created by Ogilvy and Designworks.

The bank has branches across metropolitan Melbourne and other primary urban centres including Ballarat, Bendigo, Geelong and Shepparton. It has a local executive team led by Chief Executive Mark Melvin, an Advisory Board chaired by prominent business figure Elizabeth Proust, and a CBD call centre to serve customers over the phone.

In 2015, Bank of Melbourne was announced as the anchor tenant in the Rialto's $100 million Mid town redevelopment, timed to mark the 30th anniversary of the iconic skyscraper. The bank moved its head office to the redeveloped Rialto building on the corner of Collins and King streets in the Melbourne central business district in 2017.

At its peak, Bank of Melbourne's branch network numbered 106 branches around Victoria; mostly being rebranded St George branches. From the start of 2022, the bank's dedicated branch network began to shrink rapidly, dwindling to just 9 by November 2024, being sporadically placed around Melbourne - and one each in Geelong and Ballarat - with the Box Hill, Pakenham & Watergardens branches closing in August and September 2024. The Chadstone branch closed on the 18th of October 2024, and the Eastland and Glen Waverley branches closed on the 8th of November 2024. Geelong and Fountain Gate closed on the 24th of December 2024, despite both branches receiving similar customer numbers to that of 2019. This was also the case with the Werribee and Pakenham branch closures. In 2025, Highpoint closed on the 27th of June, and Epping is due off on 29 August 2025. Westpac swung the axe on the final two suburban BOM branches in February 2026, with Westfield Doncaster due to close on the 27th of March and Knox City is due to close on the 22nd of May 2026. This leaves just the 525 Collins Street, Pavillion Bourke and Ballarat branches. The Ballarat branch was closed, but then "co-located" with the nearby Westpac branch as part of the Group's co-location program. This was to technically satisfy the Group's commitment to not close any more regional branches until 2027. Customers of the bank can, however, use all Westpac branches and ATMs for cash transactions (such as withdrawals and deposits) and general banking assistance at all Westpac branches in Australia. Further to this, Bank of Melbourne customers can access full banking services at any BankSA or St George branch in Australia (none of which are in Victoria where all of Bank of Melbourne's customers are).

Branches closed between 2021 and 2022 include, but are not limited to Mildura, Greensborough, Eltham, Caroline Springs, Balwyn, Berwick, Brunswick Barkly Square, Bundoora, Burwood East, Carnegie, Ferntree Gully, Forest Hill, Hawthorn, Ivanhoe, Karingal Shopping Centre, Mentone, Oakleigh, Rowville, Springvale, St Kilda, Toorak, Warrnambool, Northcote, 100 Collins Street, Kew, Traralgon, Croydon, Prahran, Hamilton, Colac, Greythorn, Bentleigh, Reservoir, South Yarra, Bendigo and Portland.

Branches closed in 2023 include Waurn Ponds, Casey, Chirnside Park, Moonee Ponds, Melton, Woodgrove, South Melbourne, Malvern, Horsham, Shepparton, Brimbank, Camberwell and Point Cook.

Branches closed in 2024 include Werribee, Watergardens, Southland, Geelong, Fountain Gate, South Morang, Pakenham, Box Hill, Glen Waverley, Eastland, Broadmeadows, Airport West and Preston East.

Branches closed in 2025 are Highpoint and Epping.

Branches closed in 2026 are Westfield Doncaster and Knox City.
