= Point Walter =

Point into Swan River, Western Australia

Coordinates: 32.0112°S 115.7866°E

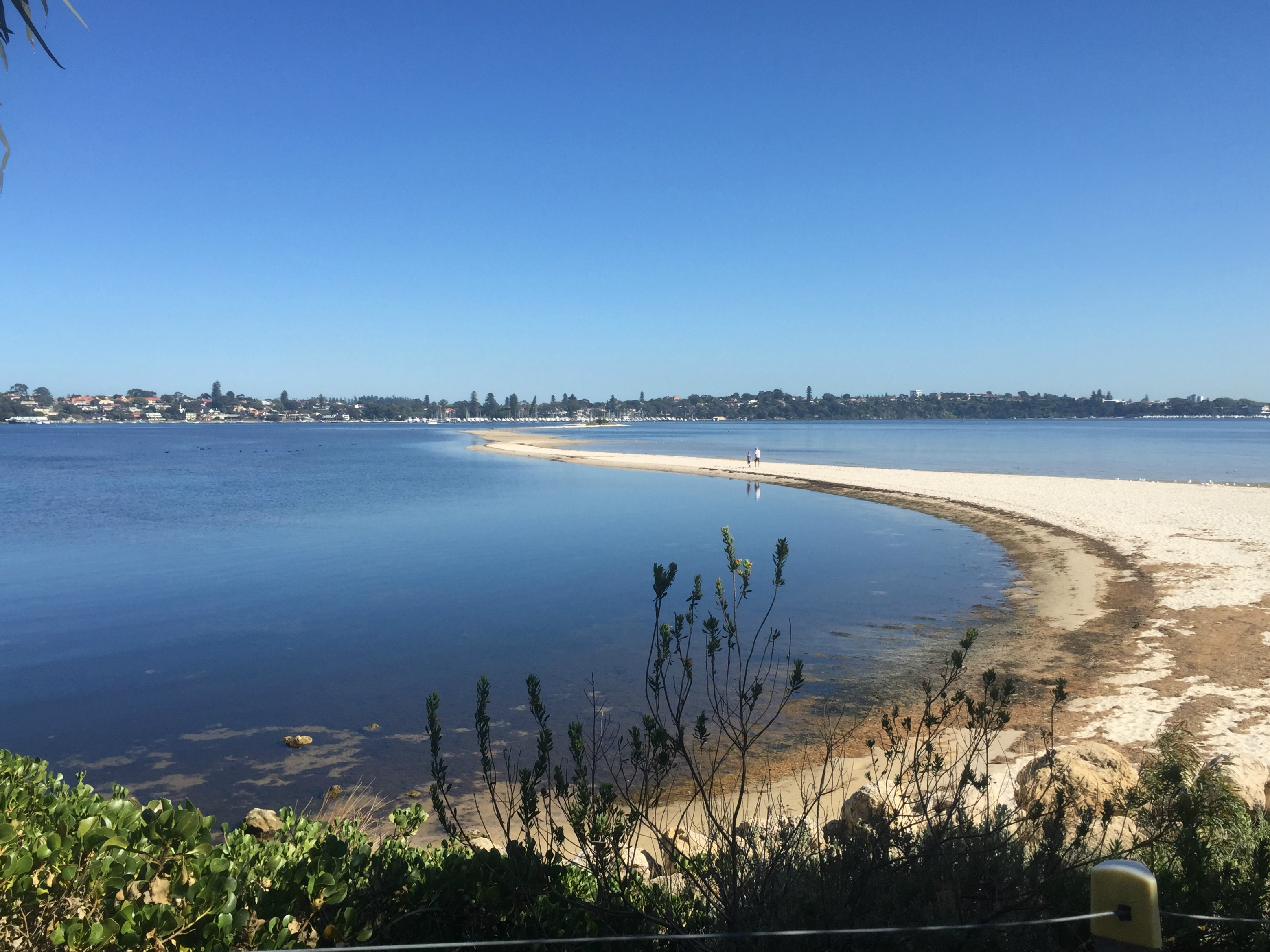
The sandbar as viewed from Point Walter

Point Walter (Noongar: Dyoondalup) is a point on the Swan River, Western Australia, notable for its large sandbar that extends into the river. It is located on the southern shore of Melville Water, and forms its western end. Point Walter is located in the suburb of Bicton, approximately 12 kilometres (7 mi) southwest of the Perth central business district, and 7 kilometres (4 mi) north-east of Fremantle, and is on the opposite side of the river to the suburbs of Mosman Park, Peppermint Grove, and Dalkeith.

Point Walter is a site of Aboriginal Australian heritage, both for its place in the Dreamtime and because of the local Whadjuk people's historical activities at the site. Named in 1827 by James Stirling, it was popular among the public for its variety of recreational activities and its facilities, such as tea rooms, a bathing house and a tavern. Through a series of events, the point suffered a drop in patronage from the late 19th century to World War II. At that time, it was rehabilitated from a state of disrepair, and an army camp was built on the premises, which was later transformed into a migrant settlement camp. Since the migrant camp's closure in 1972, the facilities have been used for multiple activities.

Since 1912 Point Walter has been run by Melville City Council, and today is contained in the Point Walter Reserve. The reserve and the sandbar serve as important sites for flora and fauna, particularly bird-life. It is popularly used for a variety of recreational activities, and currently hosts the annual Point Walter concert.

== History ==
=== Indigenous history ===
Before European settlement, the Point Walter area was inhabited by Indigenous Australians of the Beeliar people, who were part of the Whadjuk Noongars. They knew the area as Dyoondalup, meaning 'place of long flowing white hair' and 'place of white sand' in the Noongar language. It was traditionally an area for women and children, but also served as a meeting point when the clan wanted to move to another part of the river. Women at Point Walter would meet with men swimming across from Mosman Park to the sandbar. This function of the sandbar for river crossings was a key feature of the site; Mosman Park, also a place for women and children, contained a rock believed to impregnate a woman within a few weeks of her touching it. To cross the river as a group, they would cut down a tree, and children would float across the river on the log, with the adults swimming alongside them.

Aboriginals would often practise controlled burning at the site, keeping the understory low, and flushing out game. During summer months, the site was a source of food and resources through its large variety of flora and fauna. Fishing was common, and fishing traps were used extensively. Usage of the local flora included making string from the native wisteria (Hardenbergia comptoniana) and gum from the marri (Corymbia calophylla).

=== Early history ===
Point Walter is a point on the Swan River in Western Australia.

During his survey along the Swan River of suitable spots for settlement, James Stirling named Point Walter after Walter Stirling. Walter's relationship to James is disputed, with some sources claiming Walter was James' uncle, while others claim he was his brother. In 1830, the land was acquired by settlers Lionel Lukin and Alfred Waylen. Waylen developed the land by building a villa in 1830, which later burnt down. In 1831 his land was extended by 280 hectares (700 acres) to include part of his namesake suburb, Alfred Cove. The settlers were involved in skirmishes with the local Beeliar people; Waylen's house was burnt down in 1833, and one of Waylen's labourers was speared to death after another labourer killed an Aboriginal person for stealing potatoes. This, coupled with infertile soils, saw these early settlers departing; Waylen left for a land grant on Preston River, before returning two years later to establish a more successful property. During his time at Point Walter, Waylen constructed an inn known as the Halfway House due to its location between Perth and Fremantle. In 1837 he cut a canal through the sandbar, reducing the distance of a boat trip between Perth and Fremantle by about 3.2 kilometres (2 mi), and charged a toll for its use. In 1843, Samuel Caporn and his family settled at Point Walter and took over running the Halfway House, having emigrated to Australia the previous year. The Caporns moved away from Point Walter in the mid-1850s, because the canal had silted up.

The site became popular after the cutting of the canal, and was often used for crabbing, camping, swimming and picnicking. The only way to access the point was by boat, so a jetty was built. Point Walter's popularity led to the construction of two tea rooms and a timber bathing house to deal with ferries and yachting parties. Later, a limestone road was built, allowing access by horse-drawn carriages. The sources differ, but in either 1895 or 1907 the state government purchased the land, declaring it a Class A reserve, and in 1912 the Melville Roads Board (now the Melville City Council (Note: The Melville Roads Board changed its name to the Shire of Melville on 1 July 1961 in accordance with the provisions of the Local Government Act 1960. In 1968, the Shire of Melville became the City of Melville.)) was appointed to manage it. The reserve officially opened on 30 November 1914.

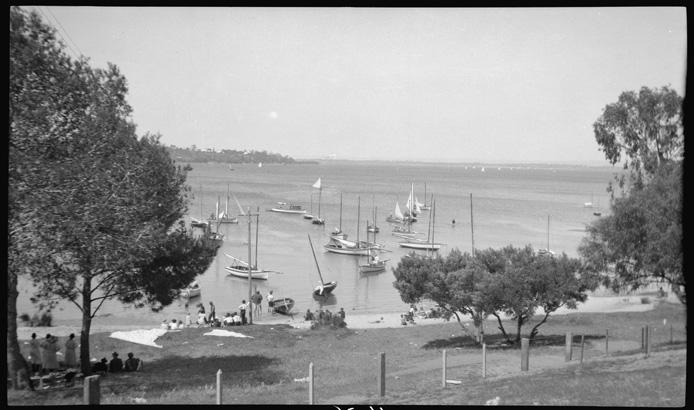
Point Walter foreshore, c. 1924

=== Decline ===
The canal at Point Walter continuously silted up, and the difficulty of upkeep led to the Caporns departing the site. After the Caporns had left the area, the local authorities did not engage in upkeep, and the canal fell into further disrepair. Steamers on the Swan River stopped using the sandbar's narrow and shallow canal, instead travelling the full distance around it. By the 1860s the canal was unused. A campaign by businessman George Randell, then controller of river traffic due to his ownership of a steamboat service, attempted to reopen the canal, but due to the cost of £A 2,000, equivalent to A$215,900 in 2022, it was not completed. The lack of steamer traffic caused a drop in popularity for the tea rooms, and with the drop in patronage from the introduction of the Fremantle-Perth railway on 1 March 1881, Point Walter became a "quiet backwater". The oldest known wreck in the Swan River is wrecked just northeast of Point Walter, a barge with a cargo of limestone identified as "Dearden's flat 1882".

In January 1923, to secure funding for the Point Walter memorial avenue, a three day carnival was held at Point Walter. By this time, the Melville Roads Board was receiving £A 100 a year for grounds maintenance, which was proving inadequate to keep the grounds in order. A further decline in use was due to the increased use of ocean beaches by the public; as a result, control of the site was passed to the Parks and Gardens Board in 1929. In 1914, a tramway was constructed between Canning Road and Point Walter, which was not considered a success as it rarely ran at a profit outside the summer months. Despite this, the line was not closed down until 1939. Further troubles came from the Depression of the 1930s, during which another drop in recreational use was experienced. World War II further decreased patronage, and Point Walter fell into a state of disrepair.

=== World War II to modern day ===
In 1941, the Melville Army Camp was constructed on the land and was used for training soldiers for waterborne warfare. In 1947, the camp was converted to a migrant reception centre, which was operated until 1969 by the State Government and from 1969 until closure in mid-1971 by Commonwealth Hostels. During the time the migrant reception centre was open, public opinion was that the majority of the migrants were communists, a situation that culminated in a 1950 piece in The West Australian addressing the issue and refuting the perception. The state of disrepair continued until November 1952 when the reserve was again put in the hands of the Melville Roads Board, which made several alterations to the site, including the removal of all old buildings, and the addition of new changing rooms, toilet facilities and a kiosk. The Board also transported 30,000 tonnes (66 million pounds) of clean sand to Point Walter Beach to rectify erosion problems, including the exposure of many limestone boulders in Point Walter's shallows. In 1972 there were hopes that a bridge would be constructed between Point Walter and Point Resolution, but prohibitive costs and other problems meant that these hopes did not come to anything.

Post-1972, the facilities were used by the Department of Education to house the Graylands Teachers College. In 1980, control of 6.5 hectares (16 acres) of the land that had previously been used for army training purposes was handed over to the Department of Sport and Recreation (DSR). In 1986 the DSR removed all remaining hostel buildings and spent a considerable sum developing the sport and recreational facilities seen today. The official reopening occurring on 26 September 1986. The facilities' first patrons were the members of the Yacht Club Costa Smeralda – the Italian syndicate that participated in the Fremantle-hosted 1987 America's Cup. In 2005 the facilities were again refurbished with funding from the DSR Capital Works Program. Today, all that remains of the army camp is a watch-house from 1941. Point Walter is currently managed by Melville Council.

== Geography ==
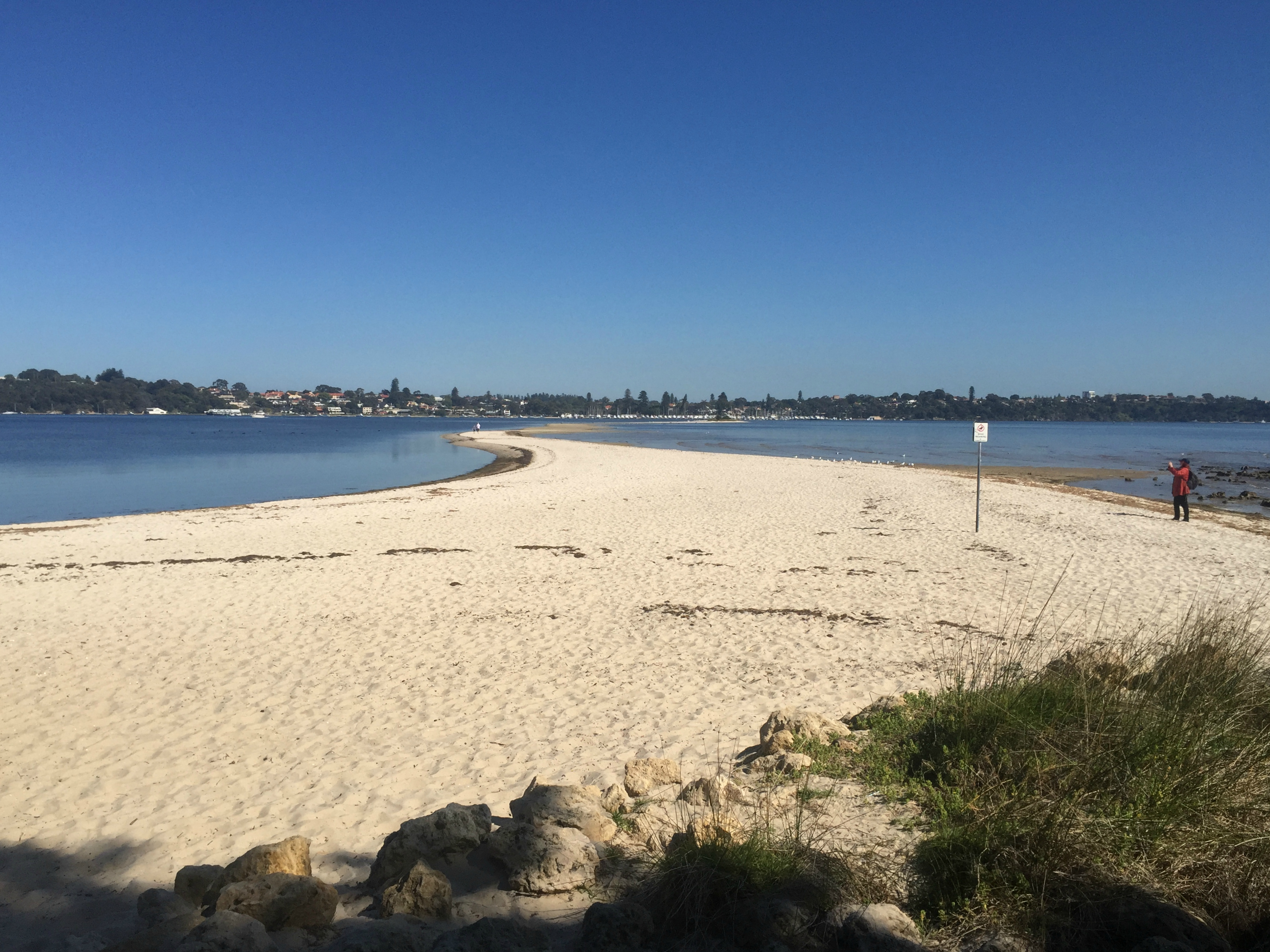
View of the sandbar from the shore

Point Walter is contained within the Point Walter Reserve, which mainly consists of the Point Walter bushland. This consists primarily of three habitats:

- A limestone ridge that outcrops on the lower slopes
- Deep yellow sand over the ridge
- Woodland higher up consisting of jarrah and marri

=== Flora and fauna ===
Within the Point Walter bushland, different habitats contain different populations of flora. The deep yellow sand supports the rare acorn banksia (Banksia prionotes) and tree smokebush (Conospermum triplinervium) species. In the higher areas are jarrah and marri woodland that is less disturbed, and there are several orchid species, including a group of rare albino fairy orchids Caladenia latifolia as well as several red spider orchid Caladenia areicola populations. The Point Walter area also supports a population of swamp sheoak (Casuarina obesa). At the base of the escarpment, out of the bushland, the most dominant features are the planted Morton Bay figs (Ficus macrophy) and the tall Norfolk pines (Arauccaria heterophylla). Poplars are also prominent, although these are considered a weed.

In terms of botanical history, the Point Walter bushland is significant, as it was at this location early botanists first collected couch honeypot (Dryandra lindleyana) and cottonheads (Conostylis candicans). In 1839, the Cryptandra glabrata was collected at Point Walter, a species which has not been seen there since.

=== Birdlife ===
In the Point Walter bushland, hollows are used for nesting by galahs and Port Lincoln parrots. Carnaby's black cockatoos feed on parrot bush in the area. The area is also home to native species of frogs, small reptiles and various insects. There are also various pest animals present in the area, such as rabbits, cats, dogs and foxes.

The sandbar is the nesting grounds of several bird species. They include the pied oystercatcher, the red-capped plover, the black swan and the fairy tern. The local government has made a conservation effort with the campaign Don't buzz that bird, telling people not to get too close to them.

=== Erosion ===
In February 2012 the environmental consulting company Natural Area Management was contracted by the City of Melville to reverse the erosion that had occurred over the previous ten years due to the loss of beaches and grassed areas, factors aided by the undercutting of tree roots. Work began in March 2012, initial works were finished in 2013, and the project was completed in early 2014.

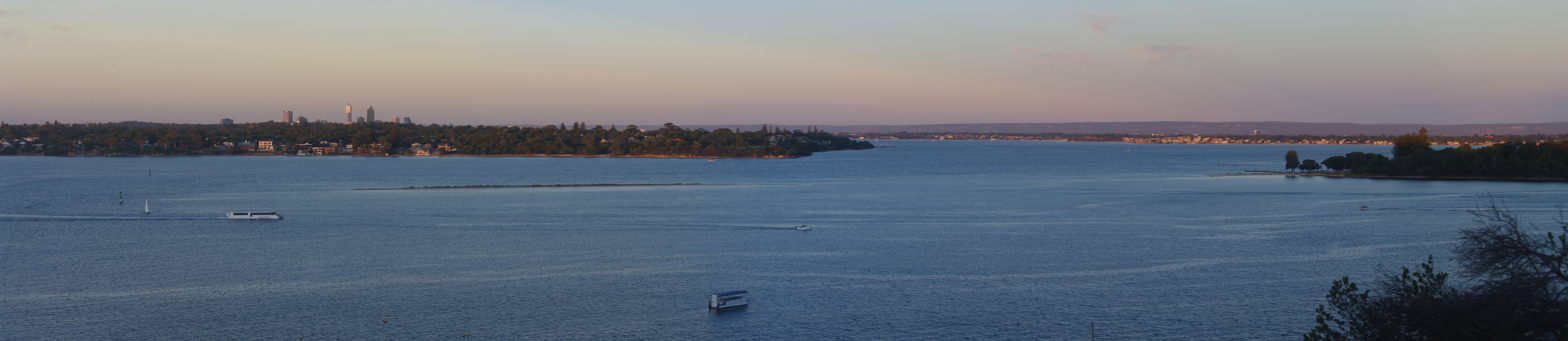
Image looking east across Point Walter and Melville Water taken from Mosman Park. The sandbar can be seen in the middle, leading from Point Walter on the right.

== Sandbar ==
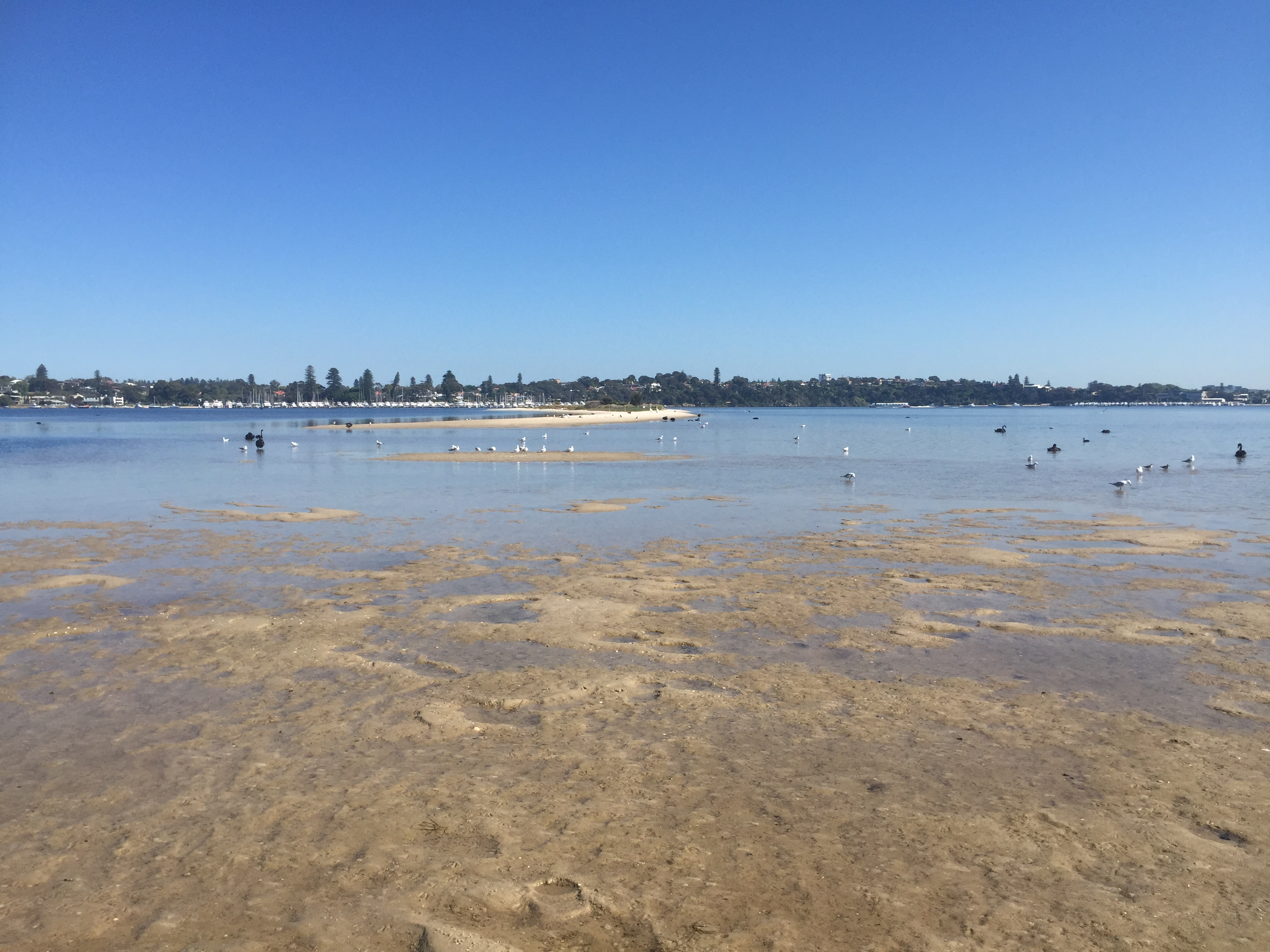
Birdlife, including seagulls and black swans, on and around the sandbar.

Point Walter is notable for the sandbar or spit that extends over 1 kilometre (0.6 mi) into the river; sections of the sandbar are often submerged at high water. The sandbar was formed through the collection of sediment along the aeolianite band that traverses the estuary.

=== Dreamtime relevance ===
The sandbar is prevalent in the Dreamtime of the local Aboriginals. They believe the sandbar was the hair of the Dreamtime figure Djunda (alternatively spelt Junda), the Charnok woman, and the nearby cliffs at Blackwall Reach were her footprints. Djunda is said to have carried spirit children in her hair, who, when they fell out, formed rocks. According to Dreamtime stories, when she reached Wave Rock in Hyden, she jumped off it into the sky, at which point her hair formed the Milky Way and the spirit children formed the stars. Due to this, Blackwall Reach is known to the Aboriginals as Jenalup, a word meaning 'the place where feet make a track'.

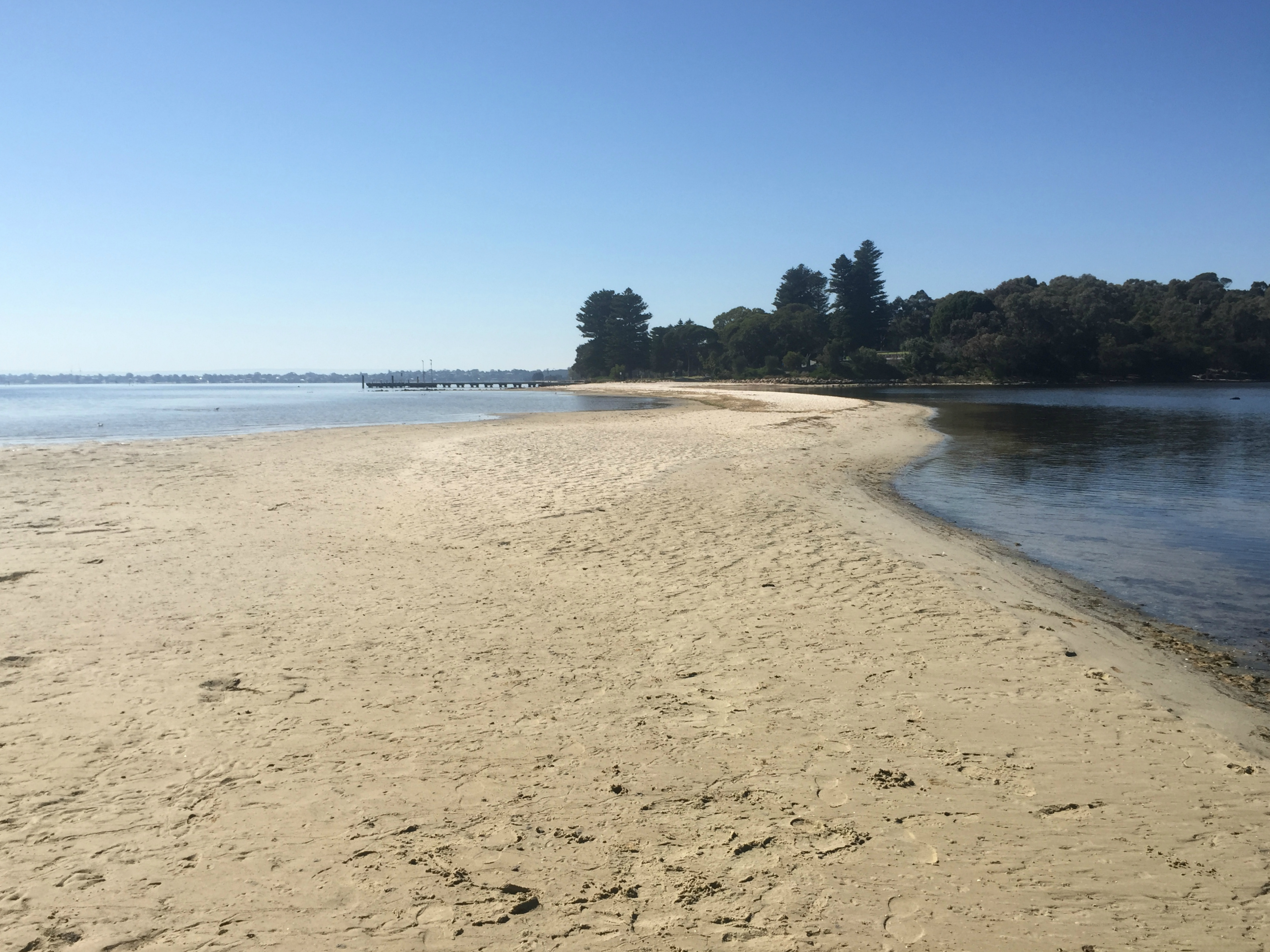
Looking towards Point Walter from 50 metres (160 ft) out on the sandbar.

== Public use ==
Point Walter is the site of various cultural monuments, including a war memorial avenue. It also hosts the free annual Point Walter concert, which started in 1996 and features Perth bands, and on occasion notable individuals such as James Morrison. Previously this event was called YAC it up because it was organised by Melville's Youth Advisory Council and featured acts such as Birds of Tokyo and Bob Evans.

Point Walter is used by the general public for a variety of activities, including kitesurfing, kayaking, canoeing, windsurfing, fishing, swimming, diving courses, prawning and picnicking. The area contains public facilities such as two shaded playgrounds, cycle and walking paths, a jetty, a boat ramp and barbecue areas. Point Walter is contained in the Point Walter Reserve, which contains the Point Walter Golf Course, and Blackwall Reach.
