= Archibald Burt =

Chief Justice of Western Australia (1861–1879)

Sir Archibald Burt QC
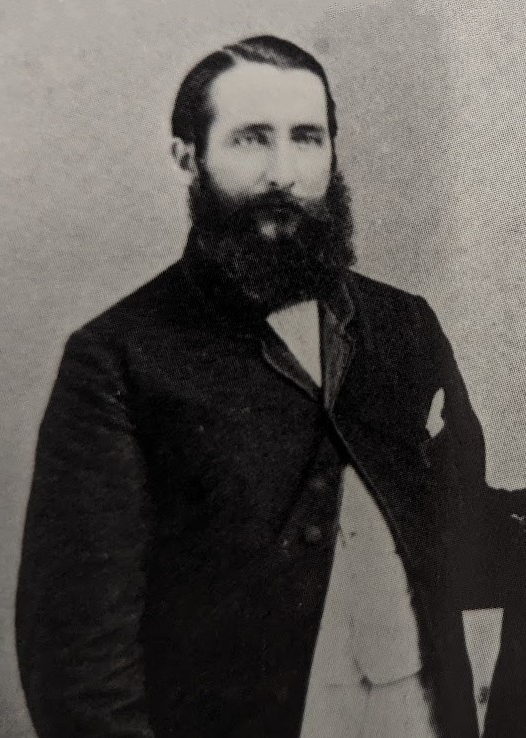
- Burt in 1860

Chief Justice of Western Australia
- In office 18 June 1861 – 21 November 1879
- Preceded by: New position
- Succeeded by: Henry Wrenfordsley

Personal details
- Born: Archibald Paull Burt; 1 September 1810 Saint Kitts
- Died: 21 November 1879 (aged 69) East Perth, Western Australia, Australia
- Resting place: East Perth Cemeteries
- Spouse: Louisa Bryan (m. 1836; died 1870)
- Relatives: Septimus Burt (son); George Leake (son-in-law); Francis Burt (great-grandson)
- Profession: Barrister; judge

Sir Archibald Paull Burt QC (1 September 1810 – 21 November 1879) was a British lawyer, politician and judge. He grew up on the island of Saint Christopher in the West Indies, where both he and his father owned slaves. He studied law in England and returned to Saint Christopher where he served as speaker of the house of assembly, attorney-general and chief justice. In 1861, Burt was appointed as the colony of Western Australia's inaugural chief justice. He held the position until his death in 1879 and was the patriarch of one of the so-called six hungry families of the colony.

== Early life ==
Burt was born on 1 September 1810 in the British colony of Saint Christopher (now part of Saint Kitts and Nevis). He was the son of Eliza Anne (née McTair) and George Henry Burt, a sugar planter from a prominent family on the island. His father served a term as speaker of the colonial house of assembly and owned several plantations, as well as over 100 slaves.

Burt likely spent his earliest years on his father's plantations, possibly on the Brothersons estate of 120 hectares (300 acres) in the Capisterre district. He was sent to England to attend a private school in Richmond, Surrey, and was then admitted to study law at the Middle Temple in April 1825, aged 14.

In 1835 and 1836 Burt was awarded compensation by the British government for relinquishing slaves in Saint Christopher. The claim on 5 October 1835 for three enslaved persons, yielded £67 0s 3d, equivalent to £7,361.19 in 2025, to Burt himself. Two claims were awarded on 15 February 1836, to Burt and Francis Spencer Wigley (who became President of Saint Christopher in 1880 and of Saint Christopher-Nevis-Anguilla in 1888), for three and four slaves, netting a total of £119 7s 9d, equivalent to £11,790.47 in 2025, for seven enslaved persons.

=== West Indies legal career ===
Burt was called to the bar of Saint Christopher in 1830, although he had not been eligible for the bar in England as he was still under the age of majority. He established a legal practice in 1833 and by 1838 had been commissioned as one of the island's few notaries public, as well as serving as an honorary aide-de-camp to the island's lieutenant-governor. He was eventually called to the bar of the Middle Temple while on a trip to England in 1845.

Burt held a number of public posts on Saint Christopher, serving on the island's legislative council, executive council, and administrative committee, as well as speaker of the house of assembly. He also served as the island's coroner and was chancellor of the Anglican Diocese of Antigua (which included Saint Christopher) from 1855 to 1860. He was identified by Willoughby Shortland in correspondence to the Colonial Office as "reputed to be the ablest lawyer in the West Indies".

In 1849, Burt was appointed attorney-general of Saint Christopher and Anguilla by lieutenant-governor Robert James Mackintosh. He received an annual salary of £300 (equivalent to $30,000 in 2025) but was permitted to continue his private practice.

== Western Australia ==
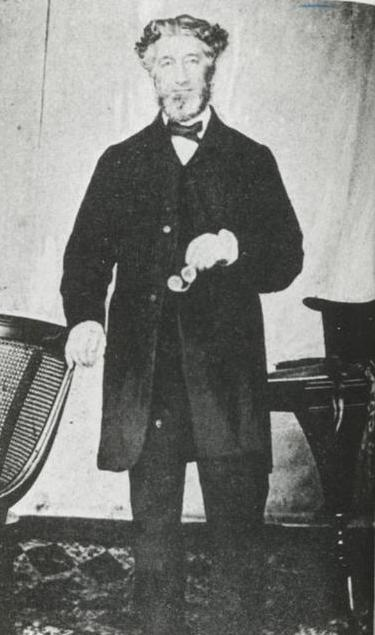
Archibald Burt

In 1857, Burt briefly occupied the position of chief justice on his native island but the appointment was not confirmed by the Colonial Office as policy did not favour the appointment of locally born barristers to the judiciary. He began to look elsewhere for judicial office, eventually accepting the post of Civil Commissioner and Chairman of Quarter Sessions in Western Australia. Burt had hoped that this would be a stepping stone to returning to his native island at a later date.

He arrived in Western Australia with his wife, Louisa Bryan, and five children on 29 January 1861. In June of that year, the supreme court ordinance was proclaimed, thus establishing the Supreme Court of Western Australia. Burt was appointed chief justice and advocate general.

The initial years of the supreme court were characterised mainly by the lack of work. Western Australia was a small colony with few legal issues. Civil work consisted mainly of insolvency and probate, and criminal offences were rare. The size of the profession was so small that only four barristers actively practised in Perth in the early 1860s.

In the early years of the court, Burt was conspicuous for his support of maintaining the division between barristers and solicitors, and also for his domination of the legal fraternity. He often gave advice to the governor and executive council that was at odds with that of the attorney general, George Frederick Stone.

As chief justice, he gained a reputation for applying the letter of the law. However, considering the conditions of a frontier colony like Western Australia this was necessary and gained Burt widespread respect. He was no stranger to controversy in his time as chief justice. In 1869 he jailed three newspaper owners for criticism of his handling of the revocation of an ex-convict's ticket of leave. Despite widespread criticism of this action, Burt remained implacable in his defence of his duty to protect the integrity of the court.

As his tenure continued, he gave up any hope of returning to the West Indies, and despite failing health during his last years, remained chief justice until his death in November, 1879. He had been a towering figure in Western Australian society and left an indelible mark on the legal profession. Burt had not courted popularity but he had earned, for himself and the new supreme court, widespread respect.

== Personal life ==
In 1836, Burt married Louisa Emily Bryan, the daughter of a local physician, at St. George's Anglican Church in Basseterre, Saint Christopher. The couple had twelve children, two of whom died in infancy. His seventh son Septimus became attorney-general of Western Australia, while his daughter Louisa married George Leake, who became the state's third premier. The prominent of Burt's children in colonial society led John Horgan to label them one of the six hungry families.

Burt was widowed in 1870 and was predeceased by two of his adult sons, who both died in 1872. He died at his home in East Perth on 21 November 1879, aged 69, with his death attributed to erysipelas of the legs. He was interred at the East Perth Cemetery.

== Legacy ==
Burt has been suggested as a model for the character of Andrew Rae in Henrietta Drake-Brockman's 1937 novel Younger Sons.

In 2015, the Division of Burt in the Australian House of Representatives was named in honour of the Burt family "for their significant contributions to the justice system and for their wider contributions to public service", in particular Archibald Burt, his son Septimus, and Septimus's grandson Francis Burt.

== Sources ==
- Bennett, John Michael (2002). Sir Archibald Burt: first Chief Justice of Western Australia 1861-1879. Federation Press. ISBN 978-1-86287-438-1.

== Family papers ==
- Burt, Archibald Paull, Sir, Papers, 1861-1895 [microform] Battye Library, MN 736, Papers of Sir Archibald Paull Burt, ACC 2829A, 2850A, 2855A Library catalogues description: Business and official letter books (1861-1895), the copy letters written after 4 November 1879 being written by his son and executor Septimus Burt; indexes to Supreme Court Civil Sittings and Court for Divorce and Matrimonial Causes Books 1-11 (incomplete); notebooks of Supreme Court Civil Sittings (1861-1867), of Supreme Court Civil Sittings and Court for Divorce and Matrimonial Causes (1867-1879) and of Supreme Court Criminal Sittings (1861-1879)

Legal offices
Preceded by (none)	Chief Justice of Western Australia; 1861 - 1879	Succeeded by Sir Henry Wrenfordsley
