= Leake family =

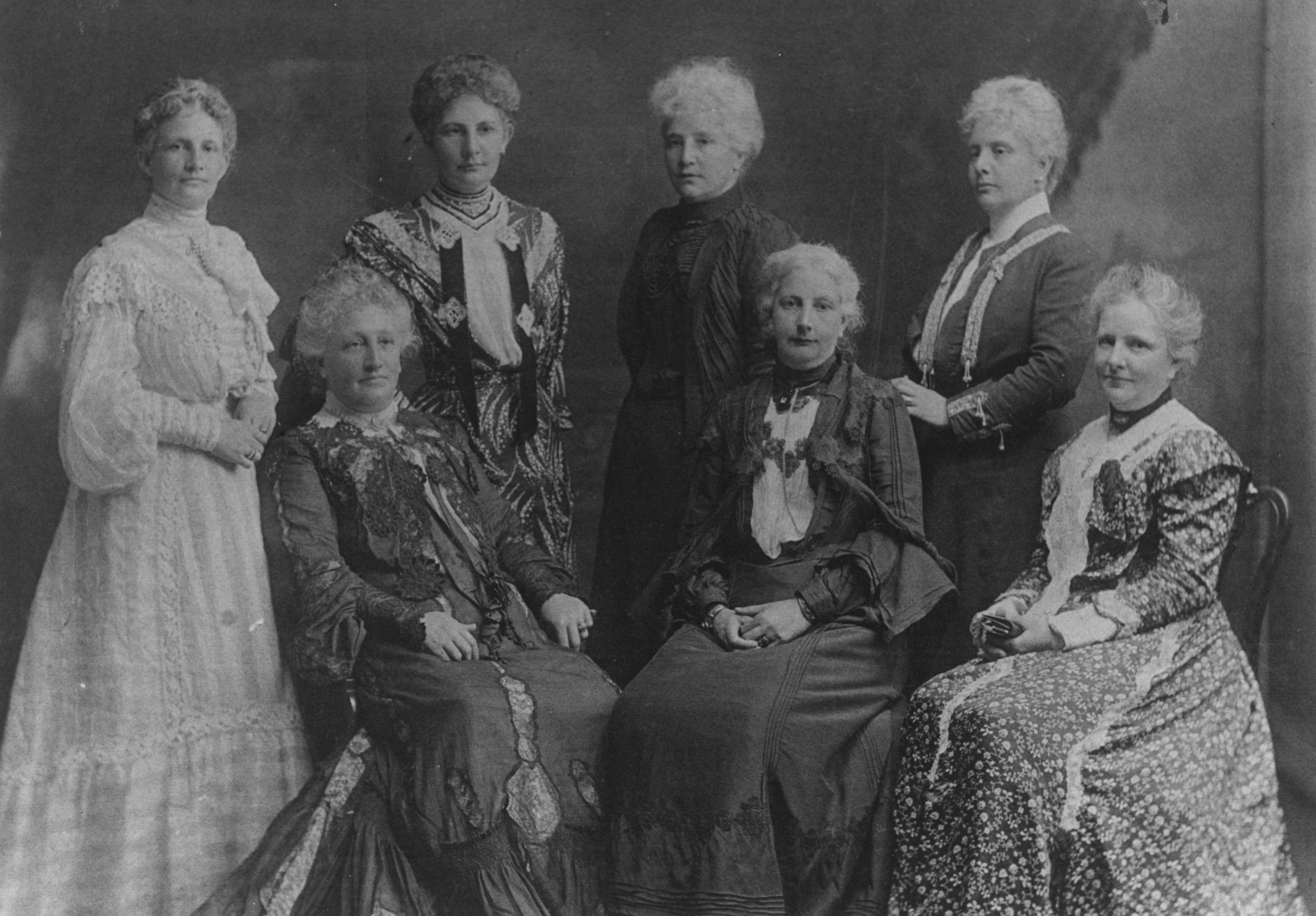
Leake sisters in 1904— Standing L to R: Blanche Kelsall, Jane Adam, Jessie Skinner, Constance Lodge. Seated: Lady Parker, Mary Parry, Rose Clifton.

A number of members of the Leake family were prominent and notable individuals in the Swan River Colony and the history of Perth, Western Australia – and the History of Western Australia.

Members of the family were included in the "six hungry families" who inter-married and sustained a significant political power in nineteenth century Perth.

== Tree ==
Luke	Miss Glover
Lucas / Luke (1682–1749)	Elizabeth Brownrigg (16??-17??)
George (1726–1771)	Alice Webster (17??–1787)
Luke (1756–1799)	Ann Heading or Hidden (1758–1836)
Luke (1784–1838)	Mary-Ann Walpole (1801–1872)	George Leake 1785–1849	1. Anne Growse; 2. ?	John (1795–1850 in Adelaide)	Catherine
John (1827–1850 in California)	Sir Luke Samuel Leake (1828–1886)	Louisa Walpole	George Walpole Leake (1825–1895)	Rose Ellen Gliddon (d.1888)	Amy Mabel May
Sarah Constance Lodge (née Leake, 1860–1939)	Blanche Edith Kelsall (née Leake, 1866–1950)	George Leake (1856–1902)	Louisa Emily Burt

== List ==
Luke m. Miss Glover

- Lucas (1682 Sudbury − 1749 Willisham) m. Elizabeth Brownrigg
  - George (1726–1771 Lothbury, London) m. Alice Webster (−1787)
    - Luke (1756 Lothbury-1799 Aldersgate, London) m. Ann Heading or Hidden (1758 Cliddersden-1836 Perth, WA)
      - Luke (1784 High Wycombe −1838 Perth, WA) m. Mary-Ann Walpole (1801–1872)
        - John (1827–1850 in California)
        - Sir Luke Samuel Leake (1828–1886) m. Louisa Walpole
        - George Walpole Leake (1825–1895) m1. Rose Ellen Gliddon m2. (1893) Amy Mabel May
          - George Leake (1856–1902) m. Louisa Emily Burt, daughter of Sir Archibald Burt
      - George Leake (1785–1849) m.1 Anne Growse m.2
      - John (1795–1850 in Adelaide)
      - Catherine

== See also ==
- Political families of Australia

== Family papers ==
- Leake family. Papers, 1824–1904 [manuscript] Battye Library, MN 392, Leake family papers, ACC 871A, ACC 1955A, 4102A, 4441A, 4702A. Library catalogue part description of papers: George Walpole Leake (1825–1895) came to Western Australia on the "Cygnet" in 1833; became land owner in the Swan district, Crown Solicitor, Acting Attorney-General, 1874–1875. His son George (1856–1902) was called to the Bar in 1880, becoming in turn Crown Solicitor, Public Prosecutor, Q.C., M.L.C. for Albany (1894–1900), then West Perth (1901–1902). Delegate to Australasian Federal Convention of 1897–1898. Premier of W.A. 1901–1902. Detailed listing available (MN 392)
