= Frank Mends Stone =

Australian lawyer and politician

The Honourable Frank Stone

Member of the Legislative Council of Western Australia
- In office 16 July 1894 – 4 June 1906
- Preceded by: None (new seat)
- Succeeded by: Francis Connor
- Constituency: North Province

Personal details
- Born: 19 April 1857 Perth, Western Australia, Australia
- Died: 10 September 1942 (aged 85) Quairading, Western Australia, Australia

Frank Mends Stone (19 April 1857 – 10 September 1942) was an Australian lawyer and politician who was a member of the Legislative Council of Western Australia from 1894 to 1906, representing North Province.

Stone was born in Perth to Charlotte Maria (née Whitfield) and George Frederick Stone. His father was Attorney-General of Western Australia on two occasions, while an older brother, Sir Edward Albert Stone, was the fourth Chief Justice of Western Australia. Like his relatives, Stone entered the legal profession. He was an associate to Sir Archibald Burt (the chief justice) from 1876 to 1878, and was called to the bar in 1882. Stone entered parliament at the 1894 Legislative Council elections, when he was elected to a six-year term in North Province. He was re-elected in 1900, and retired at the end of that term, in June 1906. Stone eventually retired to the country, dying in Quairading in September 1942, aged 85.

== Personal life ==
He had married Anne Elizabeth Lapsley in 1880, with whom he had three children. He later had another four children with a de facto wife, Dorothy Eileen Meagher.
