= Bank of Melbourne (1989) =

Bank, taken over by Westpac

- Type: Subsidiary of Westpac
- Industry: Finance and Insurance
- Founded: 1989
- Defunct: 2004
- Fate: acquired by WBC
- Headquarters: Melbourne, Australia
- Area served: Victoria, Australia
- Products: Personal Banking, Business Banking and Insurance

The Bank of Melbourne is a financial institution based in Melbourne, Australia, established in 1989 and taken over by the Westpac Banking Corporation (Westpac) in 1997. In 2004, Westpac rebranded the Bank of Melbourne branches as Westpac branches. In 2011, Westpac resurrected the brand after rebranding its purchase of Bank of St George in Melbourne specifically and possibly in response to its initial closing of the brand.

== History ==
The Bank of Melbourne was established in July 1989, following the granting of a banking licence to the RESI Statewide Building Society, with a listing on the Australian Securities Exchange following on 13 July 1989. The first chairman of the bank was Christopher Stewart, who chose Australian actor Jack Thompson to head the bank's TV advertising campaign, which ran for a decade.

The bank focused operations on retail banking, with a branch network and operations focused on the state of Victoria. As a former building society, the bank was also heavily involved in lending in the residential property market. In 1996 the bank acquired the Victorian business of Challenge Bank from Westpac for A$659.7 million, making the Bank of Melbourne the fourth largest regional bank, and the eighth largest of all listed banks in Australia. By this time the Bank of Melbourne also held 9.6% of the Victorian lending market, 11.6% of the Victorian deposit market, and operated a network of 125 branches, predominantly in Melbourne.

On 3 April 1997, Westpac made a $1.43 billion bid to acquire the Bank of Melbourne. At the time, Westpac had a branch network almost twice as large in Victoria as the Bank of Melbourne (212 branches), but a smaller share of the local lending and deposit markets (8.6% and 9.1% respectively).

The proposal required the approval of the Australian Competition & Consumer Commission, the Reserve Bank of Australia and the Treasurer of Australia; these being given by July 1997. On 29 September 1997 a vote was held for ordinary Bank of Melbourne shareholders to approve the proposal, with holders of over 96% of the shares approving the takeover. Westpac retained the rights to the Bank of Melbourne name and logos, and operated in Victoria under the Bank of Melbourne brand until January 2004, when Westpac moved all operations to a single national brand name.

In 2009, speculation suggested Westpac was to relaunch the brand for a new internet-based deposit business, but with no resulting action.

In March 2011, the relaunched Bank of Melbourne commenced operations as a subsidiary of Westpac.

== See also ==
- Bank of Melbourne (2011)
