= Perth Building Society =

Building society in Perth, Western Australia

- Company type: Building society
- Industry: Financial services
- Founded: 1862
- Founders: George Frederick Stone, J. Bruce, W. Knight, G. P. Pownall, H. Wakefield, Joseph Thomas Reilly
- Defunct: 1987
- Fate: Amalgamated with Hotham Permanent Building Society to form Challenge Bank
- Area served: Western Australia

Perth Building Society was Western Australia's first building society. It operated from 1862 to 1987, when it amalgamated with the Hotham Permanent Building Society to form Challenge Bank.

PBS was founded by WA Attorney General George Frederick Stone, Lt. Col. J. Bruce, Adjutant General W. Knight, Rev. G.P. Pownall, Magistrate H. Wakefield and Joseph Thomas Reilly.

It proposed an earlier merger in 1981 with Bendigo Building Society, but Bendigo customers and shareholders opposed the move.

Bryce Moore's history of the Perth Building Society was published in 1989.

== See also ==
- Timeline of banking in Western Australia
