= George Leake (merchant) =

Politician and merchant from Fremantle, Western Australia

- Born: 1786
- Died: 31 May 1849 (aged 64); Perth, Western Australia
- Occupation: Banker
- Spouse: Anne (Growse) Leake
- Children: Ann Elizabeth Leake
- Parent(s): Luke Leake; Ann Heading

George Leake (1786–1849) was a wealthy landholder in the early days of the Swan River Colony. Backed with considerable assets, Leake supported many of the early settlers of the colony who were struggling financially.

== Biography ==
=== Early life ===
George Leake was born in 1786 in London, England. (Note: Some sources say 1785.) His father was Luke Leake, and his mother, Ann (née Heading, 1758–1836). He arrived at Fremantle, Western Australia in the Calista in August 1829 and quickly established himself as a merchant.

=== Career ===
He was instrumental in the establishment of the first Bank of Western Australia which was established in June 1837, becoming its first chairman of directors. In 1839, he was one of four unofficial nominees of the Western Australian Legislative Council, retaining his seat until his death. He was appointed magistrate in 1839 and was made chairman of the Perth Town Trust (later to become Perth City Council).

=== Personal life ===
He married Anne Growse, who died in 1815 leaving him with one daughter, Ann Elizabeth.

His nephew, George Walpole Leake, was a prominent Western Australian barrister and magistrate and father of George Leake, Premier of Western Australia from 1901 to 1902.

=== Death ===
He died on 31 May 1849 in Perth, Western Australia.

== See also ==
- Members of the Western Australian Legislative Council, 1832–1870
- Leake family tree
