= Luke Leake =

Australian politician

- Born: 1828
- Died: 1 May 1886 (aged 57–58)
- Occupation: Politician
- Spouse: Louisa Walpole (m. 1855)
- Relatives: George Walpole Leake (brother)
- Family: Leake

Sir Luke Samuel Leake (1828–1886), M.L.C., was a Speaker of the Western Australian Legislative Council.

== Biography ==
=== Early life ===
Luke Leake was born in 1828. He was the youngest son of Luke Leake, of Stoke Newington, Middlesex.

=== Career ===
He moved to Western Australia in 1833 (then known as the Swan River Colony), where he became the member for Perth in the Legislative Council, and was the first Speaker of that body, holding the position from 5 December 1870 until his death.

He was knighted by patent in 1876 and died in 1886.

=== Personal life ===
In 1855, he married Louisa, daughter of the late Rev. Thomas Henry Walpole, vicar of Winslow, Buckinghamshire, who married secondly, in 1887, Alfred Waylen, colonial surgeon, Western Australia.

=== Death ===
He died on 1 May 1886.
