= Blackwall Reach =

Section of Swan River, Western Australia

Coordinates: 32°01′06″S 115°47′08″E

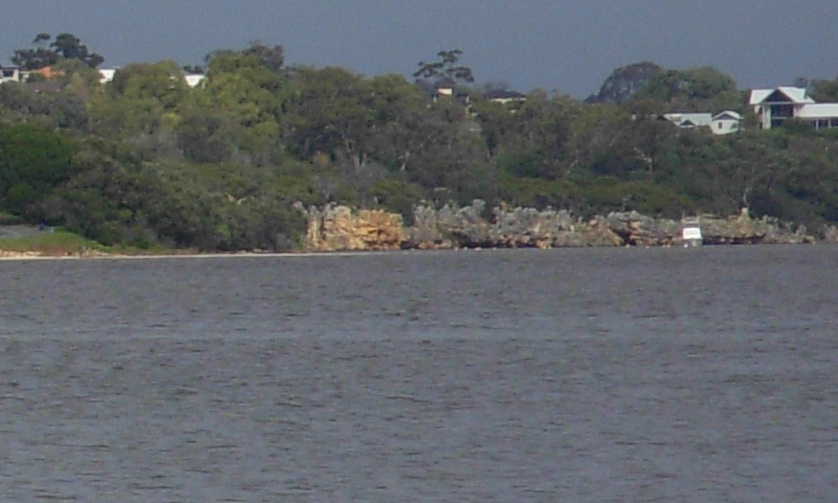
Blackwall Reach east shore cliffs viewed from the north, from Freshwater Bay, Claremont

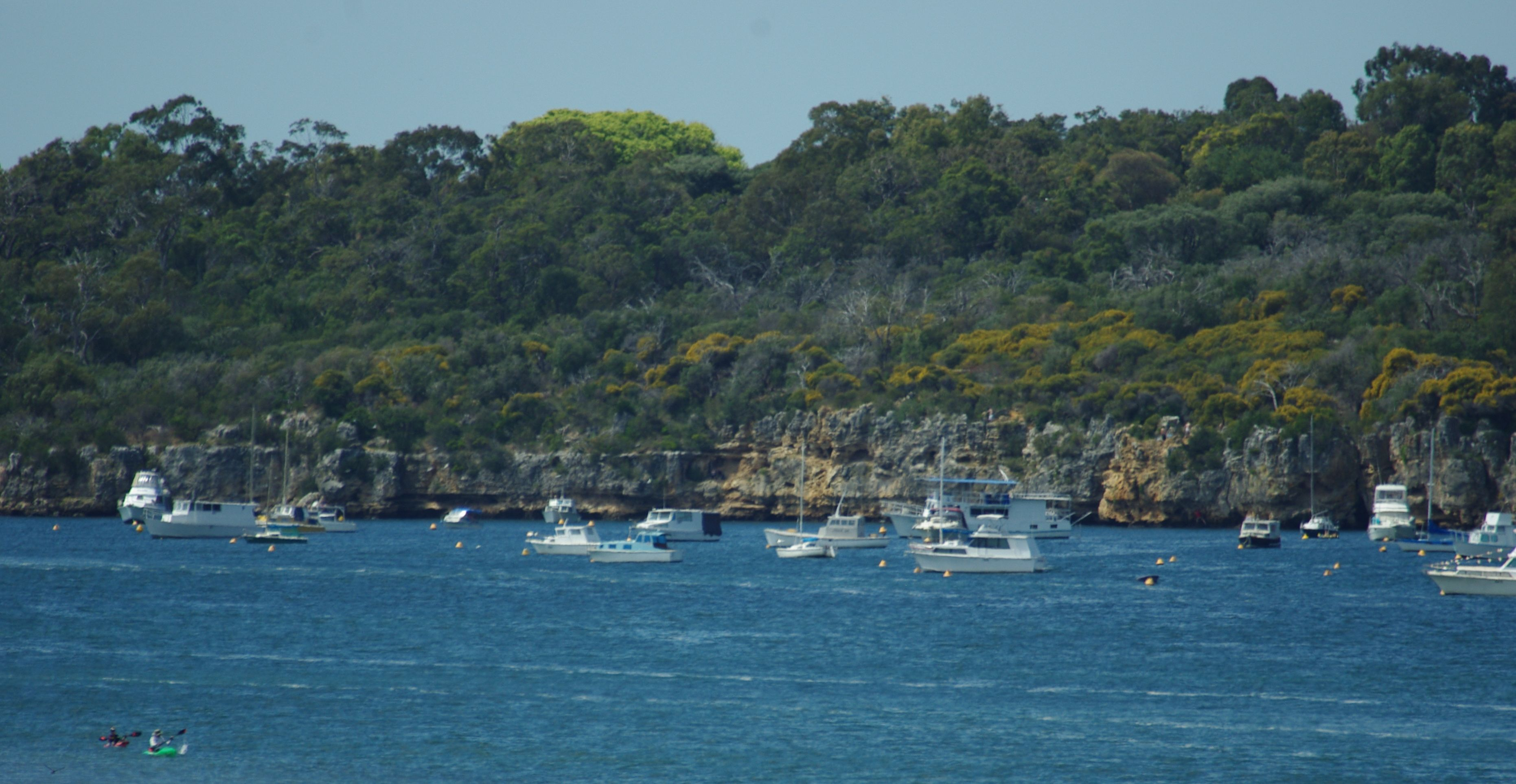
Blackwall Reach east shore cliffs viewed from the west

Blackwall Reach (Nyungar: Jenalup) is a section of the Swan River in Western Australia.

Blackwall Reach was named after an area of the River Thames near Greenwich UK in 1896 by admiralty surveyor L. S. Dawson. The name originally referred to that part of the river, rather than either side, but this changed in the twentieth century when the riverside land on the eastern bank just south of Point Walter was specifically called Blackwall Reach. It contains limestone cliffs, and remnant vegetation adjacent to the river's edge.

The location is a popular spot for cliff jumping and for rock climbing. However, since the creation and management of the clifftop reserve, signage advises against jumping. Non-adherence to this signage has resulted in fatalities.

Due to its location close to the ocean, unusual fish catches have sometimes occurred.

Prior to European settlement, the area was known to the Noongar indigenous people as Jenalup, a sacred place linked to the Dreaming stories.
