= Challenge Bank =

Australian bank

- Company type: Public company
- Traded as: Originally ASX: CLG
- Industry: Retail banking
- Founded: April 1987
- Founder: Hotham Permanent Building Society and Perth Building Society
- Defunct: 1995
- Fate: Acquired by Westpac
- Headquarters: Perth, Western Australia, Australia
- Area served: Victoria and Western Australia
- Website: www.challengebank.com.au

Challenge Bank was an Australian bank. It was established in April 1987 when the Hotham Permanent Building Society of Victoria and Perth Building Society of Western Australia merged. It produced one of the most iconic ads of the 1980s. In December 1995 it was purchased by Westpac. In May 1996, the Victorian business was sold to the Bank of Melbourne that in turn was purchased by Westpac in 1997. The Challenge Bank brand was retired in the early 2000s.
