= George Frederick Stone =

Australian politician

George Frederick Stone (1812 – 18 August 1875) was a Western Australian lawyer and Attorney General of Western Australia from 1854 to 1857 and again from 1860 to 1870.

In July 1833, he was appointed notary public. In 1834, he was named as acting sheriff, the position becoming permanent in 1839. In 1841, he became registrar of births, marriages and deaths. Elected to the Agricultural Society in 1841, he was appointed a director and temporary secretary of the Western Australian Bank, which had been established in June 1841.

== Death ==
Stone died at Rose Hill, Perth, on 18 August 1875.

== Family ==
On 6 September 1838, Stone married Charlotte Maria, daughter of Captain F. Whitfield, resident magistrate of Toodyay. Of their nine children, their second son, Edward Albert Stone, was Chief Justice of Western Australia, while another son, Frank Mends Stone, was a member of the Parliament of Western Australia.
