= George Walpole Leake =

Australian politician

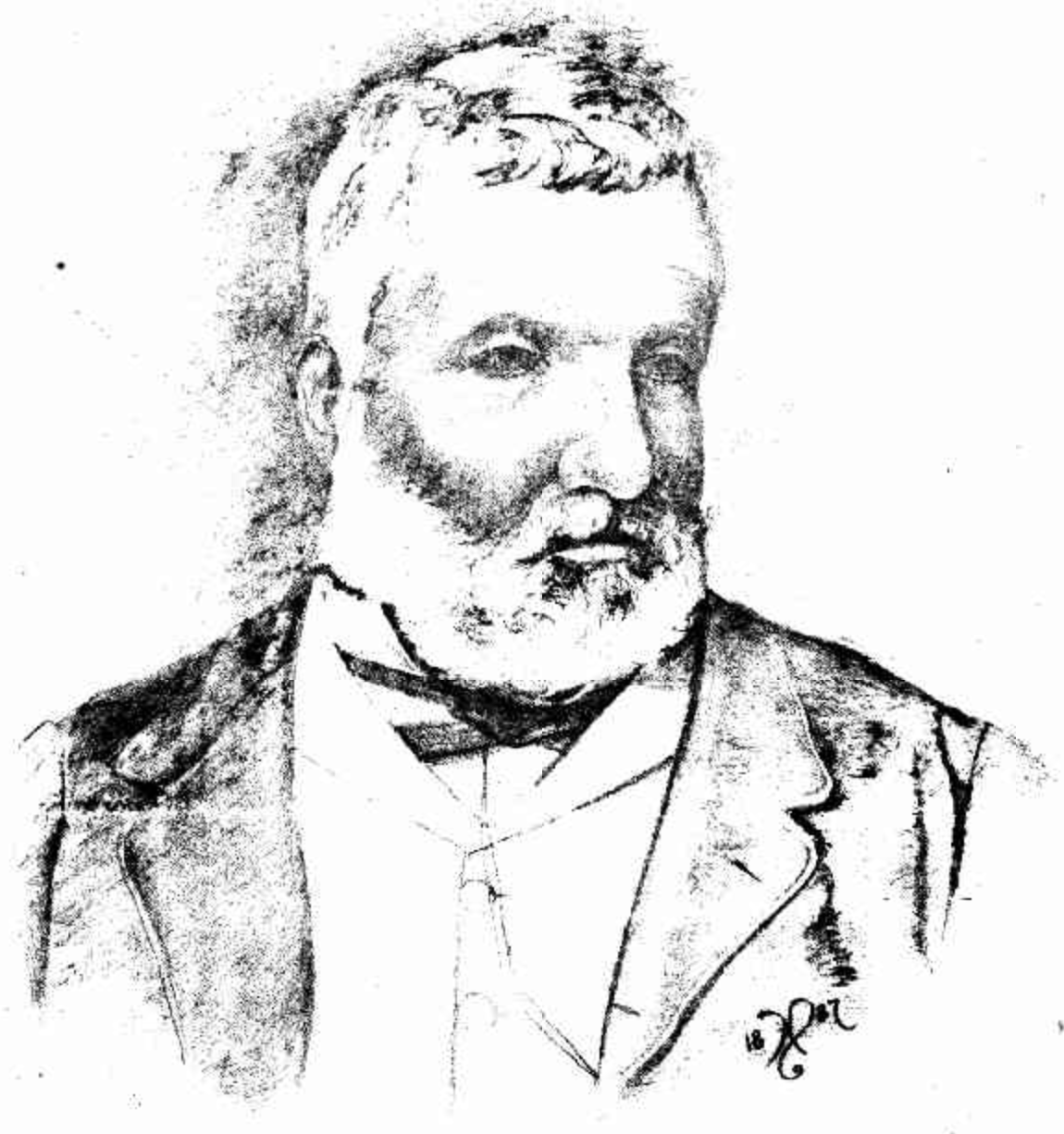
George Walpole Leake in 1887

George Walpole Leake (3 December 1825 – 3 October 1895) was a Western Australian barrister and magistrate and nephew of George Leake (1786–1849). For short periods of time he was also Attorney-General of Western Australia.

Leake held the following positions in Western Australia:

- 1857–1858: Acting Crown Solicitor, confirmed February 1860
- 1863–1866: Acting Police Magistrate, Perth
- 1873–1874: Public Prosecutor
- 1875–1875: Q.C. and Crown Solicitor
- 1879–1880: Acting Attorney-General and a member of the Executive and Legislative Councils
- 1879–1880: Acting Chief Justice
- 1881–1881: Police Magistrate, Perth
- 1883–1883: Acting Attorney-General and a member of the Executive and Legislative Councils
- 1886–1886: Acting Government Resident, Geraldton
- 1887–1887: Acting Puisne Judge
- 1888–1888: Acting Chief Justice
- 1889–1890: Acting Puisne Judge

In December 1890, Leake was nominated to the new Western Australian Legislative Council, having resigned his position as police magistrate.

== Personal life ==
Leake arrived in the Swan River Colony aged 7 on 27 January 1833, on board Cygnet. He travelled with his mother; his father having arrived in the colony some years previously. He did not stay long in Australia, being sent back to England after a few years to be schooled at King's College in London. Returning to the colony briefly after this, he then moved to Adelaide to study law.

He married Rose Ellen Gliddon in September 1850. Among their children were George Leake (1856–1902), who became Premier of Western Australia. Rose died in 1888, and Leake remarried shortly after to Amy Mabel May, a woman 40 years his junior. They had one daughter.

He retired in 1891, and died four years later. His estate went to his second wife.

The estate of his childless brother, Luke Samuel Leake, was inherited by Luke's widow when Luke died in 1886, and who then remarried and returned to England.

== See also ==
- Leake family tree
