= James Harding (harbourmaster) =

Harbourmaster at the Fremantle Harbour, Western Australia

Captain James Harding (1811 – 23 June 1867) was the third harbourmaster at the port of Fremantle (1851–1867).

Harding had arrived at King George Sound in 1846 on Dromo with his first wife, Elizabeth, and four young children. The family went back to England for two years between 1848 and 1850 for the children's schooling. He returned to Fremantle in 1850, and by 1851 was appointed acting Harbour Master of Fremantle upon the resignation of Daniel Scott; the position was confirmed in 1852.

In 1851, Harding's youngest daughter, Emily Louisa died, followed in December 1852 by his wife. On 30 March 1853, Harding married for the second time, to Jane Harris; on the same day his eldest daughter Sarah Elizabeth, aged seventeen, married Charles Wittenoom, the fifth son of the Colonial Chaplain John Burdett Wittenoom. One son, Edward Horne, went on to be a prominent Australian politician; another, Francis Frederick Burdett, became a prominent pastoralist and explorer. Later the same year Harding's second daughter, Mary Rose, died in an accident whilst traveling to visit her older sister in Gwambygine.

Jane died in December 1862 and in March the following year, Harding married Sarah Wickliffe, an Irish immigrant girl.

In 1864, James Richard Harding, the last surviving child and only son of Harding was killed by Aborigines near Roebuck Bay. Harding did not know his son's fate until an expedition led by Maitland Brown returned to Fremantle with his body in May 1865.

Harding acquired a number of properties in Norfolk, Suffolk and Adelaide Streets in Fremantle, and in 1866 purchased a land parcel north of Butler's Swamp for £20.

On 23 June 1867, he drowned in the course of his duty, attempting to assist two ships, Ivy and Strathmore, in distress in Gage Roads. Harding's body, identified only by his clothing, was not discovered until eight weeks later on Garden Island.

Harding left all of his estate to his wife Sarah; however she was unable to cope with the grief of losing her husband and was committed to the Fremantle Lunatic Asylum. Her older sister, Maria, came over from Victoria and was appointed the executor of Sarah's estate. In 1891, Harding's land at Butler's Swamp was sold off and subdivided, becoming the suburb of Graylands.
