= Wittenoom =

Wittenoom may refer to:

People

- John Burdett Wittenoom (senior) (1788–1855), colonial chaplain of the Swan River Colony
- Charles Wittenoom (senior) (1824–1866), fifth son of John Burdett (snr)
- Sir Edward Horne Wittenoom (1854–1936), pastoralist and politician in Western Australia, son of Charles (snr)
- Frank Wittenoom (1855–1939), pastoralist in Western Australia, son of Charles (snr)
- Charles Wittenoom (1879–1969), pastoralist and politician in Western Australia, son of Sir Edward

Places

- Wittenoom, Western Australia, a ghost town in northern Western Australia, abandoned after the effects of asbestosis were realised.
- Wittenoom Hills, Western Australia, a locality of the Shire of Esperance
