= Lockier Burges (entrepreneur) =

Explorer and settler of Western Australia

Lockier Clere Burges (1841 – 6 January 1929), also known as L. C. Burges Jr., was prominent and controversial in Western Australia as an entrepreneur, explorer and author.

Burges, the son of John Major Burges and Dorcas Bradshaw, was born at Fethard, County Tipperary, Ireland, in 1841.

In 1862 Burges emigrated to Western Australia, where three of his uncles lived, including L. C. Burges senior (c. 1814–1886) and William Burges (c. 1807–1876). In 1868, L.C. Burges junior married Ann Eliza Finnerty at Fremantle.

From late 1864, he worked for the Roebuck Bay Company (RBC) at the first, albeit short-lived station in the Kimberley, at Cape Villaret. In 1865, Burges took part in the La Grange expedition, which recovered the bodies of the explorers Frederick Panter, James Harding and William Goldwyer and explored the area between Cape Villaret and Lagrange Bay. The expedition was responsible for the reprisal killing of up to 20 members of the Karajarri people.

After the collapse of the RBC, Burges established Andover sheep station, on the upper Harding River, in the Pilbara. Burges also invested in pearling vessels based in Nickol Bay. At the time, stations in North-West Australia were staffed almost entirely by local Aboriginal people who were paid in kind with "rations" (food and other goods) rather than money.

In 1871, while droving sheep from the Pilbara to Geraldton, Burges shot and killed an Aboriginal man known as "Mackle-yell", in a dispute over a stolen saddle. He was convicted of manslaughter in 1872, and sentenced to five years imprisonment. The sentence was commuted to 12 months. Governor Frederick Weld dismissed Perth Stipendiary Magistrate E.W. Landor for failing to charge Burges with the capital charge of murder, convicting him of the lesser charge instead. The dismissal was appealed to Secretary of State for the Colonies Lord Kimberley, who reinstated Landor.
