= David Francisco =

Australian politician

David Bras Francisco (22 February 1841 – 29 April 1888) was a member of the La Grange expedition of 1864, which searched for three men missing in the Kimberley region of Western Australia.

Born in Western Australia on 22 February 1841, Francisco left Western Australia in February 1852 on the Dido, but returned in March 1861 on the Dolphin. He worked as an auctioneer and estate agent in Fremantle.

In 1864, Francisco travelled to the north west of Western Australia on the Clarence Packet. The primary charter of the Clarence Packet was to aid in the execution of the La Grange expedition in search of three missing men, Frederick Panter, James Harding and William Goldwyer. Francisco fell in with the party, and ended up a participant in the expedition. His diary remains a valuable independent record of the expedition.

In 1867, Francisco became a foundation member of the Fremantle Town Council, serving until 1875. In 1868 he married Ellen Hillman; they would have five children. He died in 1888.
