= Gwambygine, Western Australia =

Gwambygine
- Town
- Interactive map of Gwambygine
- Coordinates: 31.95°S 116.80°E
- Country: Australia
- State: Western Australia
- LGA: Shire of York
- Location: 109 km (68 mi) E of Perth; 13 km (8.1 mi) SSE of York
- Established: 1902

Government
  - State electorate: Central Wheatbelt
  - Federal division: Bullwinkel

Area
  - Total: 48.2 km^{2} (18.6 sq mi)
- Elevation: 208 m (682 ft)

Population
  - Total: 83 (SAL 2021)
- Postcode: 6302

Gwambygine is a small town in the Wheatbelt region of Western Australia. It is situated between the towns of York and Beverley, on the banks of the Avon River.

One of the first known settlers was John Burdett Wittenoom, who was granted land in the area in 1831 and named his property Gwambygine. This property was later purchased by the state government in 1901 and sub-divided into blocks called Gwambygine Estate. Some of the land along the Avon was developed as a townsite, which was gazetted in 1902.

A railway siding known as Hick's Siding was established adjacent to the town in 1902. The siding was named after J. Hicks, who had leased the property in the 1860s. The siding was renamed Gwambygine in 1910.

Gwambygine Pool is also close to the town. It is one of the few permanent pools found along the Avon River.

A park has been built next to the pool with a boardwalk, viewing tower, playgrounds, gas barbecues and other facilities. The Gwambygine Homestead, the oldest homestead in Western Australia, is close to the town. The homestead was being restored in 2011 by the National Trust of Australia. The homestead was initially built by the Wittenoom family in the 1830s.

The name of the town is Aboriginal in origin and is the name of a nearby hill also known as Bald Hill. The meaning of the name is not known.

== See also ==
- List of heritage places in the Shire of York
