= La Grange expedition =

Expedition leading to massacre in Western Australia

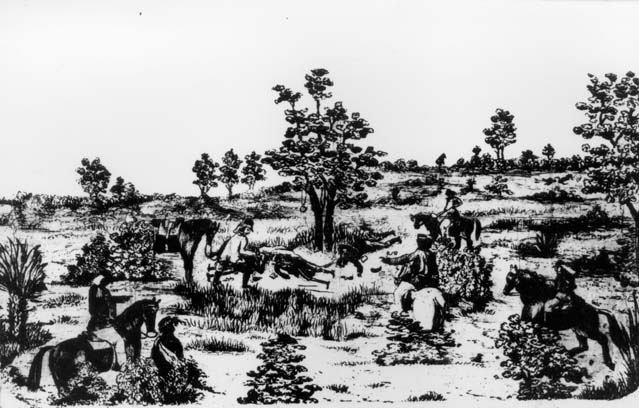
Discovery of the remains of the explorers Messrs Panter, Harding & Goldwyer, from the Inquirer and Commercial News, 1864

The La Grange expedition was an expedition in 1865 to the vicinity of Lagrange Bay in the Kimberley region of Western Australia. Led by Maitland Brown, the expedition initially searched for three settlers who had failed to return from an earlier exploring expedition. The three men were eventually found dead, having been speared and clubbed to death by Aboriginal people, some apparently in their sleep. Between six and twenty Aboriginal people were subsequently killed by members of the expedition in a controversial protracted fight that is often now referred to as the La Grange massacre.

== Background ==
In 1864, an expedition was organised to investigate the story of a convict named Henry Wildman, who claimed to have found gold near Camden Harbour. The expedition found no gold, but good pastoral land was found, and as a result a small pastoral venture was later established at Roebuck Bay. In November 1864, three settlers, Frederick Panter, James Harding and William Goldwyer, set out from the settlement to explore the land around La Grange Bay. The expedition party had provisions to last only two to three weeks, so when they had not returned three weeks later, another settler, Lockier Burges, set out to find them. He tracked them as far as the mangrove swamp around La Grange, but there lost all trace of them.

When news of the missing men reached the Government of Western Australia in Perth, a search party was organised, with Maitland Brown appointed leader. There was some speculation that the three men had been killed by Aboriginal Australians, and there were calls for their deaths to be avenged. George Walpole Leake, for example, wrote:

They have fallen in the service of their fellow-subjects, and it is our bounden duty to ascertain how and where they have fallen: and if by violence, avenge them.

For this reason the expedition is sometimes referred to as a punitive expedition.

== Search ==
A boat, Clarence Packet, was chartered, and the party, led by Maitland Brown and including David Francisco and Lockier Burges, left Fremantle on 16 February 1865. On 25 February, Clarence Packet anchored at the mouth of the De Grey River. Members of the party visited Walter Padbury's station for news on the missing men, but there was none. The party then spent nearly two weeks waiting for an Aboriginal person named Dutchmanchum to be found. Dutchmanchum was said to speak the language of the tribes in the Roebuck Bay area, so he was desired to guide the party. When Dutchmanchum was eventually brought in, he related a story that three white men had been attacked and murdered at a river called Boola Boola in the vicinity of La Grange Bay. Over the next few days, a number of other Aboriginal people were encountered that corroborated Dutchmanchum's story.

On 13 March, the party sailed for Roebuck Bay, anchoring off Cape Villaret on the 18th. Four days later, Brown took some of the party over the Race Course Plains, where they captured five more Aboriginal persons. These again corroborated Dutchmanchum's story, and one of them, Lear-a-ban, stated that some of the persons involved in the killings were camped near Cape Latouche Treville. Brown then decided to seek them out.

Brown's treatment of the Aboriginal people encountered up until then had been harsh, and at this point he wrote in his journal that he was prepared to arrest any Aboriginal people whom he thought guilty of the killings, but added:

But I trust that throughout the whole trip there will be no necessity for capture – that not only amongst this lot, but also amongst all others we may meet, the guilty [Aboriginal persons ...], if such there are, will either attack us or resist us in such a manner as will of itself justify us in exterminating them.

Clarence Packet was directed to proceed to Cape Latouche Treville, and Brown's landed party set out for the location on 27 March. Three more Aboriginal people were captured that day, and a large group the following day. Brown thought some of these men guilty of involvement in the attack, and sent ten of them aboard ship. One of these, Karimba, said that he could guide the search party to the remains of the murdered men, but after leading them to Boola Boola, he was unwilling to reveal any more, and guided them back and forth through the thickets for most of a day. Karimba had also managed to call to an Aboriginal person to bring men to rescue him, and the party found themselves being followed by a large group of armed Aboriginal people.

Eventually, Karimba was sent on board ship, and two other Aboriginal persons, who were thought most likely to have been involved in the killings, were brought on shore to act as guides. These guides led them directly to the site of the killings. The three white settlers were found all dead. Two of them, Panter and Harding, had obviously been speared and clubbed to death in their sleep, as they still had their handkerchiefs tied over their eyes. The nature of Goldwyer's death was harder to interpret, but there were no signs of a struggle. The dead men's journals indicated that they had been involved in a number of fights with Aboriginal Australians, and that they were expecting further hostilities.

Brown had the bodies wrapped and packed for removal to the ship. While this was being carried out, the two guides tried to escape and were shot dead by Tommy, one of the Aboriginal assistants brought with the party to act as guides.

== Massacre ==
Instead of returning to the ship, the expedition continued to examine the country. Brown described this as further "exploration", but most scholars now agree that the evidence points to a punitive expedition; indeed, one of the plaques on the Maitland Brown Memorial that in part has commemorated the expedition for the past 113 years plainly calls the group of people conducting it the "punitive party". On 6 April 1865, Brown's party became engaged in a conflict with a large group of Aboriginal people. Most accounts state that the party walked into an ambush, but at least one account asserts that they attacked an Aboriginal camp. Regardless of the cause, the outcome is not in dispute: at least six, and possibly as many as twenty Aboriginal people were killed, whereas the expedition party suffered no injuries.

== Aftermath ==
The search party returned to Perth in May 1865. Panter, Harding and Goldwyer were given a public funeral. It was the largest ever seen in Western Australia; the funeral train consisted of some 750 people, and thousands of spectators lined the streets on the way to the East Perth Cemetery, where the men were buried.

Maitland Brown returned home to public acclaim, both for successfully finding the men, and for avenging their deaths. Indeed, many settlers felt "the requital Mr. Brown had inflicted on the murderers utterly inadequate". The English Government, however, expressed the view that "force had been exercised towards the [Aboriginal people ...] without sufficient warranty" and urged the necessity of maintaining friendly relations with the local Aboriginal people.

Maitland Brown died in 1904 and was buried at Karrakatta Cemetery, but in 1911 his remains were removed from Karrakatta and reinterred with the remains of Panter, Harding and Goldwyer at East Perth. Shortly afterwards, Pietro Porcelli was commissioned to create a memorial to Brown. The result was the Maitland Brown Memorial, a bronze head and shoulders statue of Brown, on a granite base to which is attached plaques portraying the murdered colonists only and describing the circumstances of their deaths. During the 1990s, the biased nature of the monument was recognised, and another plaque was added that describes the circumstances from the point of view of the Aboriginal people while leaving the biased and offensive aspects of the monument in place.

== See also ==
- Explorers' Monument
- List of massacres of indigenous Australians

== Sources ==
- Brown, Maitland (1865). Journal of an Expedition in the Roebuck Bay District, under the Command of Maitland Brown, Esq., in Search of Messrs. Panter, Harding, and Goldwyer. Reprinted from the "Perth Gazette and W. A. Times," of 19 and 26 May 1865.
- Burges, Lockier Clere (1913). The Pioneers of the Nor'-West Australia. Constantine and Gardner, Printers and Publishers, Geraldton.
- Cowan, Peter (1988). Maitland Brown: A View of Nineteenth Century Western Australia. Fremantle Arts Centre Press, Fremantle, Western Australia. ISBN 0-949206-27-X.
- Forrest, Kay (1996). The Challenge and the Chance: The Colonisation and Settlement of North West Australia 1861–1914. Hesperian Press, Victoria Park, Western Australia. ISBN 0-85905-217-6.
- Francisco, David (1928). The Panter-Harding-Goldwyer relief expedition of 1865: being a copy of a diary kept by one of the members of the expedition led by Mr. maitland Brown to the Roebuck Bay District in search of Messrs Panter, Harding and Goldwyer, whose murdered bodies were found at their camp on Lake Ingedana. Royal Western Australian Historical Society.
- Scates, Bruce (1989). A Monument to Murder: Celebrating the Conquest of Aboriginal Australia in Layman, Lenore and Tom Stannage (eds), Celebrations in Western Australian History (Studies in Western Australian History X), University of Western Australia, Nedlands, Western Australia.
