= Fremantle War Memorial =

War memorial and park in Fremantle, Western Australia

- operated by the City of Fremantle
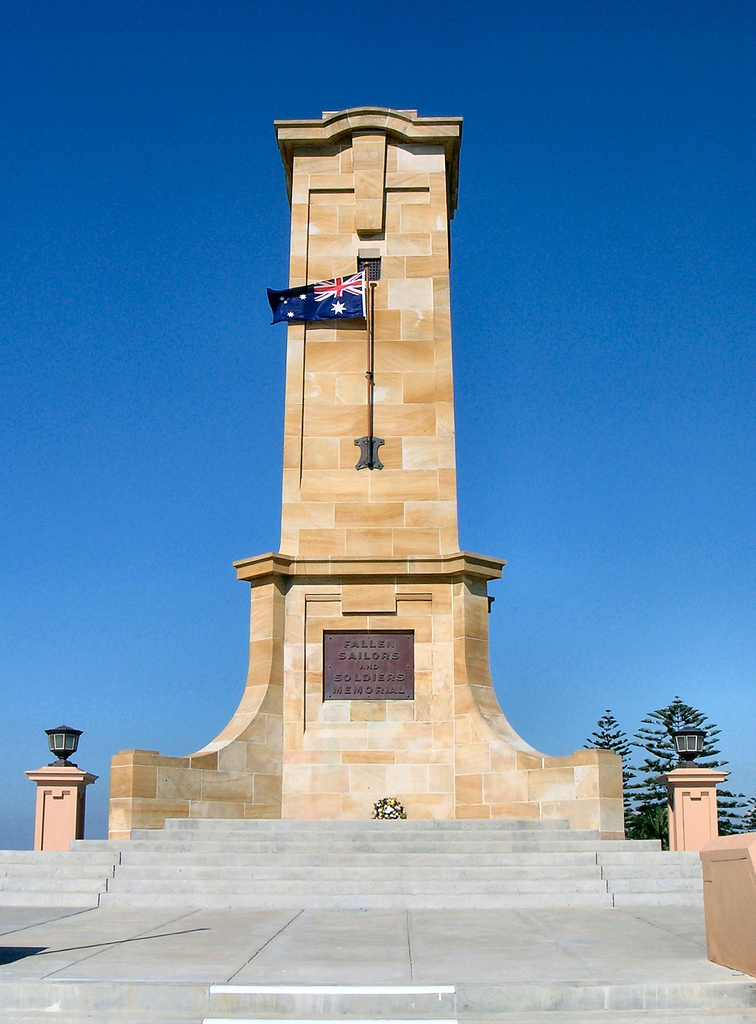
- For Fremantle servicemen and servicewomen
- Unveiled: Armistice Day (11 November), 1928
- Location: 32.05229°S 115.757237°E near Fremantle, Western Australia
- Designed by: J. F. Allen; C. H. Nicholas
- Building details
- Interactive map of the Fremantle War Memorial area

General information
- Type: Monument

Design and construction
- Main contractor: Pietro Porcelli

Western Australia Heritage Register
- Type: State Registered Place
- Designated: 28 August 2001
- Reference no.: 3956

The Fremantle War Memorial is a war memorial located on Monument Hill Memorial Reserve, an 4.5-hectare (11-acre) public reserve and hill in Fremantle, Western Australia. The memorial itself comprises a large obelisk, the Fallen Soldiers' and Sailors' Memorial, surrounded by eight smaller memorials. The site, located on High Street near the centre of Fremantle, overlooks Fremantle Harbour, and was established by the Fremantle Town Council in 1928 to commemorate the losses of the First World War, having been used as a public reserve since the early 19th century.

== Location ==
The War Memorial is located on Monument Hill in the suburb of Fremantle, approximately 43 metres (141 ft) above sea level. The hill overlooks Fremantle Harbour, Garden Island, and Rottnest Island to the west, and the Darling Ranges to the east, and is the highest natural point of elevation between the Indian Ocean and the Darling Ranges. Monument Hill was identified early as one of the best vantage points in Fremantle. The reserve is surrounded by residential properties immediately to the north, south, east, and west, although Fremantle Prison, Christian Brothers College, and John Curtin College of the Arts are less than 500 metres (1,600 ft) away to the south-west, north-west, and north, respectively. Four roads – Bateman Street, High Street, Knutsford Street, and Swanbourne Street – border the reserve, and Solomon Street runs through the centre, allowing vehicular access.

Under the name Monument Hill Memorial Reserve the land comprising the memorial has been designated a Class-A reserve under the Land Administration Act 1997, which means that the purpose of the reserve cannot be changed except with the consent of both state houses of parliament. Under the name Monument Hill and War Memorials, Fremantle, the site was listed on the Register of Historic Places on 28 August 2001, with the Register Listing noting:

the complete panorama (and the view of Fremantle and Gage Roads in particular) afforded from the place, its urban parkland containing mature trees and open spaces, and the open character and almost constant breeze at its summit (particularly in the warmer months) are all aesthetic characteristics of the place that continue to attract visitors and locals alike and contribute to the community's sense of place [...].

== History ==
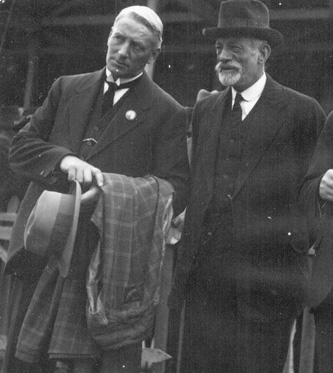
Frank Gibson (left) and William Watson headed the Fremantle War Memorial Committee in 1923

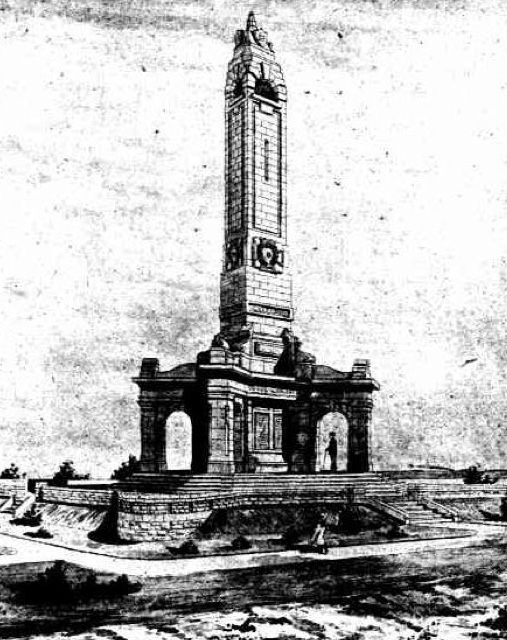
A sketch of the proposed memorial published in The Sunday Times in February 1925

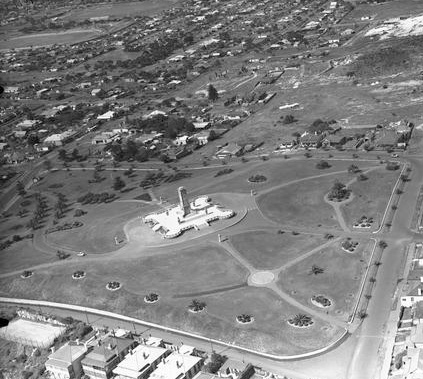
An aerial photograph of the memorial taken by Frank Hurley in the 1930s

=== Prior uses ===
An obelisk at the summit of Monument Hill was constructed in 1874 for use as a trig point by surveyors and navigators. In an 1870s planning map of Fremantle, the obelisk was shown under the name Obelisk Hill, which remained in use until its demolition prior to the construction of the memorial in the 1920s. The area around the hill comprised limestone outcrops and low scrub. After the Western Australian gold rushes in the 1890s, a number of shanty towns, commonly referred to as "canvas towns", came into existence on the outskirts of Fremantle, including on Monument Hill. The reserve was vested as a public park on 20 July 1904, under the name Obelisk Reserve. Under the specifications of Fremantle's town engineer, quarrying of the limestone outcrops commenced shortly after, and was used by a number of local companies, including the Fremantle Tramways. Various landscaping works were carried out between 1904 and 1910, including the planting of trees, and construction of footpaths, drinking fountains, and fixed jarrah seats.

=== Fallen Soldiers' and Sailors' Memorial ===
The Fremantle Town Council established a Fremantle War Memorial Committee in 1921, to work towards "the erection of a fitting monument in memory of the men who enlisted from the port". The initial proposal was for a 20-metre (65 ft) obelisk, costing between £A 4,000 and £A 5,000. A meeting of the committee in April 1922, presided over by the Mayor of Fremantle, Frank Ernest Gibson, MLA, tentatively accepted the design of Messrs. Wilkinson and Ross, of Claremont, with second place going to Mr. S. Rosenthal, of Perth. A separate citizens' committee was formed in February 1922, and reviewed plans by Messrs. Crossland and Harvey for the grounds. Fundraising for the monument began in earnest on Anzac Day (25 April), 1922, with the organisation of a flower show, button days, and the selling of local produce. Approximately £A 1,600, equivalent to A$149,000 in 2022, had been raised by October 1922. The main committee also referred a proposal for an improved roadway to the hill to the works committee, pointing out the road was necessary for "the carting of material to be used in the construction of the memorial".

Further fundraising continued throughout the following year, with the memorial committee, now headed by Gibson and William Watson, the federal member for the seat of Fremantle, commencing a campaign to exploit the mercantile community of the town, which had "not yet been properly canvassed", in March 1923. A meeting of the committee in November 1923, presided over by Mrs. F. Instone, recommended that tenders be called for the construction of the monument, after a discussion in which the idea was raised that only a portion of the contract be proceeded with, with the object of "shaming people into contributing towards the fund of having the memorial completed". A further special meeting was held in April 1924, again presided over by Gibson. J. W. Bateman, who had previously resigned from the committee in protest at the poor response of shipping and commercial interests, was present at the meeting by invitation. The decision was made to proceed with the erection of the memorial "as far as the funds collected would permit", despite the "apathy of the citizens in the matter of subscriptions". The committee also moved to approach the architects Allen and Nicholas, who had gratuitously undertaken the role of supervisors in the construction of the monument, to secure estimates for the cost of the memorial. Three estimates were received in September 1924, with the highest for £A 11,700, and the lowest for £A 6,450. One of the architects, Mr. Allen, altered some of the specifications of the monument in order to save money, substituting concrete for steel for certain work, and removing a spiral staircase and stone seats at the base of the hill.

An article, accompanied by a sketch of the proposed memorial in The Sunday Times in February 1925, noted the height of the monument would be 26 metres (85 ft) "from top to bottom", comprising an 18-metre (60 ft) tower, and a 5.5-metre (18 ft) base, giving a total height above sea level of 74 metres (244 ft). The noted Italian-born sculptor Pietro Porcelli was placed in charge of the construction, having previously designed the Explorers' Monument and a statue of C. Y. O'Connor in Fremantle.

=== Unveiling ===
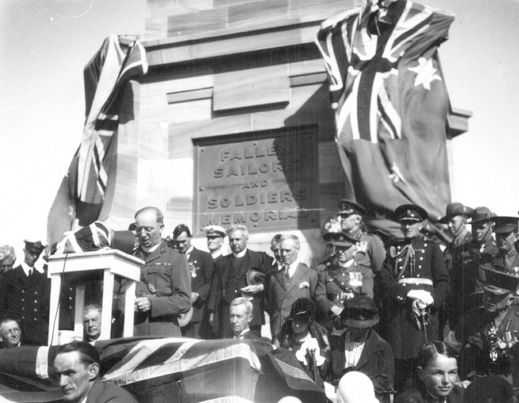
The 11 November 1928 unveiling ceremony

The memorial was completed and inaugurated in 1928. An initial ceremony was held on Anzac Day (25 April) 1928 to dedicate a memorial tablet on the main column prior to the completion of the memorial. This ceremony was carried out by Archbishop Riley. The main unveiling, after construction had finished, took place later that year on Armistice Day (11 November). The unveiling was carried out by the Lieutenant-Governor of Western Australia, Robert McMillan, with the memorial dedicated by Canon Collick.

=== Further memorials ===
Plans for the erection of memorial gates commemorating those who fought in the Second World War were proposed in 1948, with work commencing in 1952. The gates comprised two grey granite entrance pillars, with cast bronze panels and ornamental work. The original deadline for the work was Anzac Day, 1952, however, only the bronze plaques were unveiled, with the memorial entrances not opened until Anzac Day, 1963. A 530-millimetre-diameter (21 in) mounted torpedo dedicated to the memory of United States Navy submariners who died at sea during the Second World War was unveiled by Rear Admiral Herman J. Kossler on 8 September 1967, jointly financed by the City of Fremantle and the United States Submarine Veterans Association. A memorial dedicated to members of the Allied submarine crews based in Fremantle during the Second World War was unveiled by Sir Douglas Kendrew, the Governor of Western Australia, on Trafalgar Day (21 October), 1972, incorporating a periscope from HM Submarine Tabard.

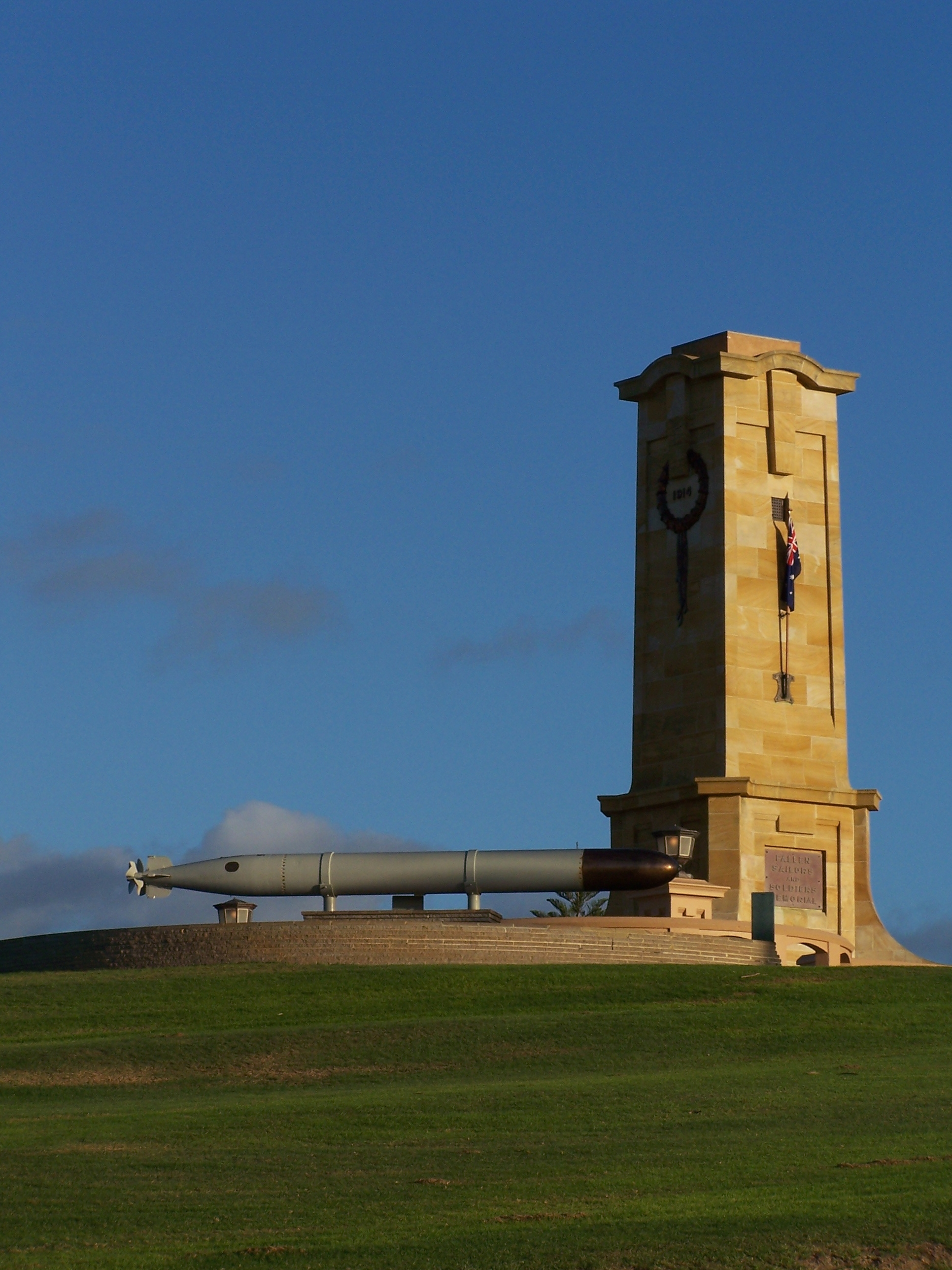
Memorial prior to Anzac Day in 2006

A plaque commemorating those killed in Malaya (1948–60), Korea (1950–53), Borneo (1962–66), and Vietnam (1962–72), was unveiled on 11 May 1975. A memorial funded by the Royal Australian Navy Corvettes Association was unveiled on 7 October 1984, commemorating those who served on Australian corvettes in the Second World War. Another plaque, erected by the Netherlands Ex-Servicemen's Association of Australia, was unveiled in 1991, remembering Dutch services based at Fremantle between 1942 and 1947. A further memorial, consisting of a ship's anchor resting on a raised base, was unveiled 23 October 1994 by Sir Francis Burt, marking Royal Navy personnel of the Second World War. Other memorials, unveiled on 27 August 1995 and 3 November 1996, respectively, were dedicated to the Australian Merchant Navy and the Royal Marines.

==== List ====
Memorial	Dedicated	Image	Reference
Merchant Mariners Memorial	27 August 1995		
Netherlands Ex-Servicemen's Association of Australia Monument	1991		
Submarine Periscope Memorial	21 October 1972		
Royal Australian Navy Corvettes	7 October 1984		
Royal Australian Navy in Vietnam	30 November 2002		
Royal Marines Memorial	3 November 1998		
Royal Navy Memorial	23 October 1994		
United States Submariners Memorial	16 September 1967		

== Uses ==
Commemorative services are held yearly on Anzac Day (25 April) and Remembrance Day (11 November). The Fallen Soldiers' and Sailors' Memorial is designed so that at dawn "1914" is illuminated, and at sunset "1919" is illuminated, alluding to a line in the Ode of Remembrance:

At the going down of the sun
and in the morning,
we will remember them.

On Anzac Day, the shadows are exactly aligned.
