= Lockier Burges =

Lockier Burges may refer to:

- Lockier Burges (politician) (c. 1814–1886), early settler in colonial Western Australia and member of the Western Australian Legislative Council
- Lockier Burges (entrepreneur) (1841–1929), entrepreneur, explorer and author in Western Australia
