= Shire of York =

Coordinates: 31°53′S 116°46′E

- Local government area
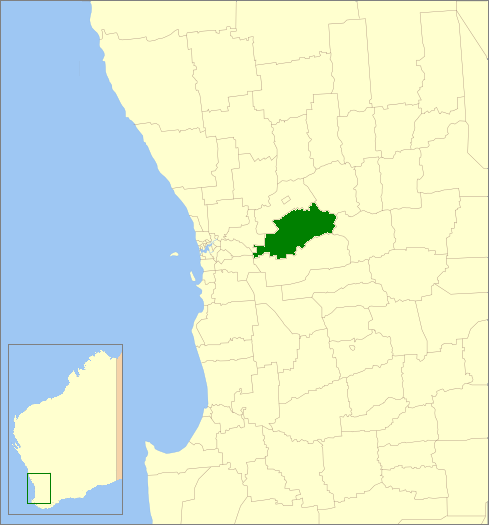
- Location in Western Australia

- Interactive map of Shire of York
- Country: Australia
- State: Western Australia
- Region: Wheatbelt
- Established: 1871
- Council seat: York

Government
  - Shire President: Kevin Trent
  - State electorate: Central Wheatbelt
  - Federal division: Bullwinkel

Area
  - Total: 2,132.7 km^{2} (823.4 sq mi)

Population
  - Total: 3,459 (LGA 2021)
- Website: Shire of York
LGAs around Shire of York
Mundaring	Northam	Cunderdin
Mundaring	Shire of York	Quairading
Kalamunda	Beverley	Beverley

The Shire of York is a local government area in the Wheatbelt region of Western Australia, covering an area of 2,133 square kilometres (824 sq mi) just beyond the eastern fringe of Perth's metropolitan area. The Shire's seat of government is the town of York. The current shire president is Chris Gibbs, with his deputy being Denese Smith.

== History ==
The Shire of York was established as the York Road District on 24 January 1871. The townsite of York separated as the Municipality of York (later the Town of York) ten weeks later on 7 March 1871. It became a shire on 1 July 1961 following the passage of the Local Government Act 1960, which reformed all road districts into shires. The Town of York merged back into the shire on 15 March 1965.

== Wards ==
The council was previously split into three wards - Town (4 councillors), West (2 councillors) and East (3 councillors) - but these were abolished and an election for 6 councillors for the entire Shire was held on 6 May 2006.

== Towns and localities ==
The towns and localities of the Shire of York with population and size figures based on the most recent Australian census:

Locality	Population	Area	Map
Badgin	11 (SAL 2021)	85 km^{2} (33 sq mi)	
Balladong	93 (SAL 2021)	50.3 km^{2} (19.4 sq mi)	
Burges	11 (SAL 2021)	40.8 km^{2} (15.8 sq mi)	
Caljie	38 (SAL 2021)	77.6 km^{2} (30.0 sq mi)	
Cold Harbour	108 (SAL 2021)	41.2 km^{2} (15.9 sq mi)	
Daliak	58 (SAL 2021)	43.9 km^{2} (16.9 sq mi)	
Flynn	0 (SAL 2016)	427.1 km^{2} (164.9 sq mi)	
Gilgering	85 (SAL 2021)	153.1 km^{2} (59.1 sq mi)	
Greenhills	46 (SAL 2021)	66.4 km^{2} (25.6 sq mi)	
Gwambygine	83 (SAL 2021)	48.2 km^{2} (18.6 sq mi)	
Inkpen	13 (SAL 2021)	79.4 km^{2} (30.7 sq mi)	
Kauring	72 (SAL 2021)	79.6 km^{2} (30.7 sq mi)	
Malebelling	39 (SAL 2021)	94 km^{2} (36 sq mi)	
Mount Hardey	154 (SAL 2021)	77.2 km^{2} (29.8 sq mi)	
Mount Observation	0 (SAL 2016)	135.8 km^{2} (52.4 sq mi)	
Narraloggan	36 (SAL 2021)	136.8 km^{2} (52.8 sq mi)	
Quellington	22 (SAL 2021)	57.1 km^{2} (22.0 sq mi)	
St Ronans	66 (SAL 2021)	98.8 km^{2} (38.1 sq mi)	
Talbot	114 (SAL 2021)	180.4 km^{2} (69.7 sq mi)	
Wilberforce	21 (SAL 2021)	141.9 km^{2} (54.8 sq mi)	
York	2,393 (SAL 2021)	17.6 km^{2} (6.8 sq mi)	

== Notable councillors ==
- Frederick Monger, York Municipality councillor 1892; later a state MP
- Garnet Wood, York Road Board member 1932–1951; also a state MP

== Heritage-listed places ==
As of 2023, 321 places are heritage-listed in the Shire of York, of which 34 are on the State Register of Heritage Places.

== See also ==
- List of heritage places in York, Western Australia
- List of heritage places in the Shire of York
