= Explorers' Monument (Western Australia) =

Controversial monument in Fremantle, Western Australia

Coordinates: 32.057512°S 115.744228°E

The Maitland Brown Memorial, also known as Explorers' Monument, is a monument located in Esplanade Park in Fremantle, Western Australia. Unveiled on 8 February 1913, it is approximately 6 metres (20 ft) high, and consists of a head and shoulders statue of Maitland Brown sitting on granite pedestals on a granite base inset with five plaques, one depicting three explorers, Frederick Panter, James Harding and William Goldwyer. Brown died on 8 July 1905, 7 years prior to the unveiling of the monument, and Panter, Harding and Goldwyer 48 years prior on 13 November 1864. The monument was commissioned by George Julius Brockman who is depicted by one of the five plaques, and the statue of Brown was sculpted by Pietro Porcelli. Because the monument as originally erected is biased, such as by celebrating colonists "as intrepid pioneers" in contrast to Aboriginal people that "are condemned as treacherous natives", an additional plaque was added on 9 April 1994 that left the original offensive and biased aspects in place.

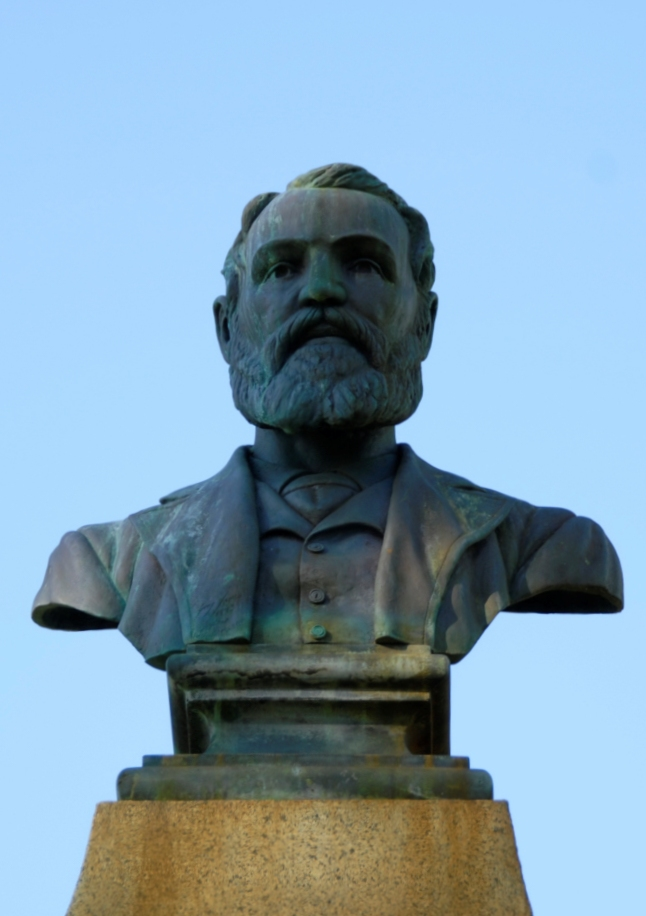
Bust depicting Maitland Brown at the top of the Maitland Brown Memorial

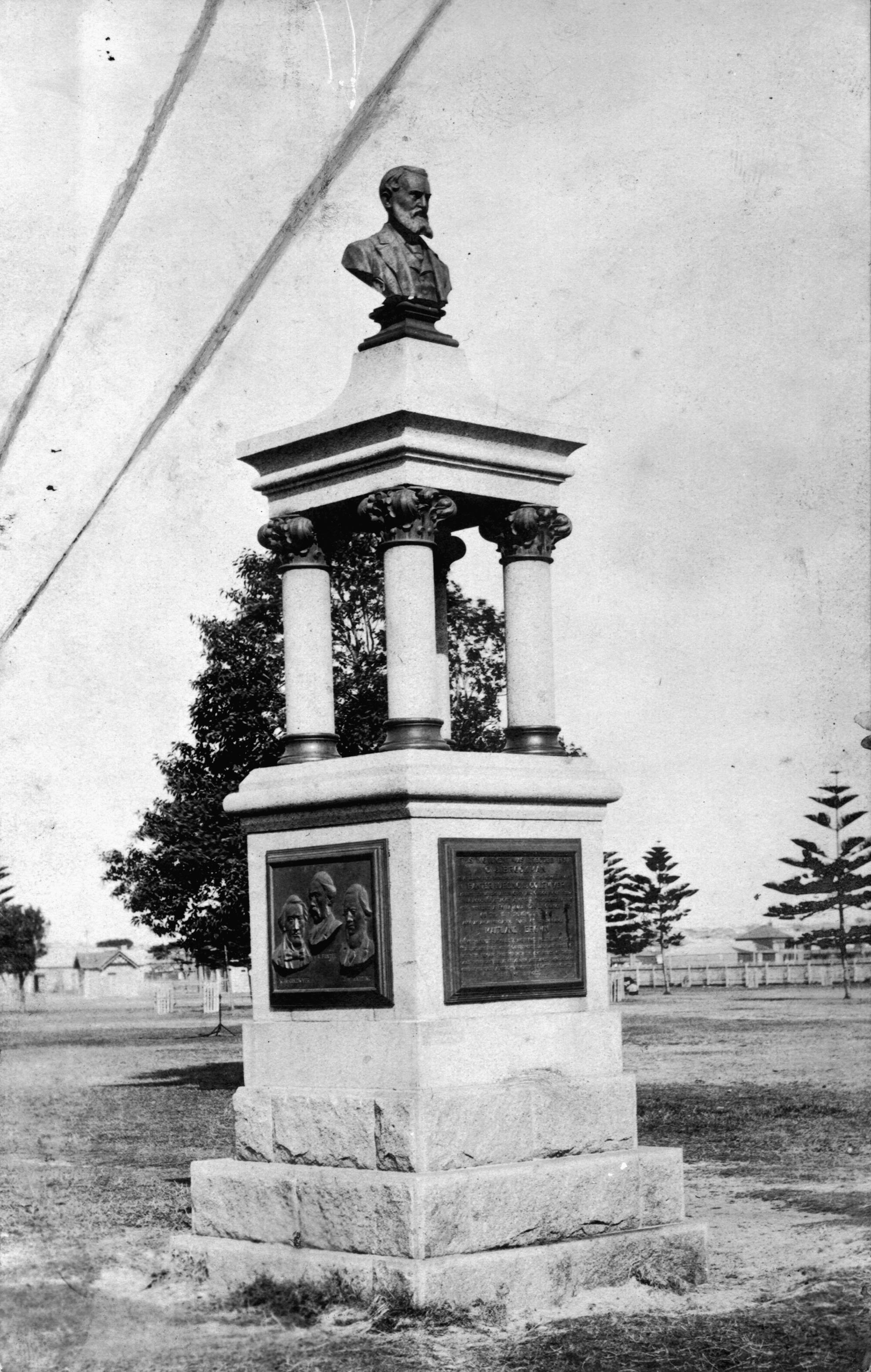
The monument in the 1920s

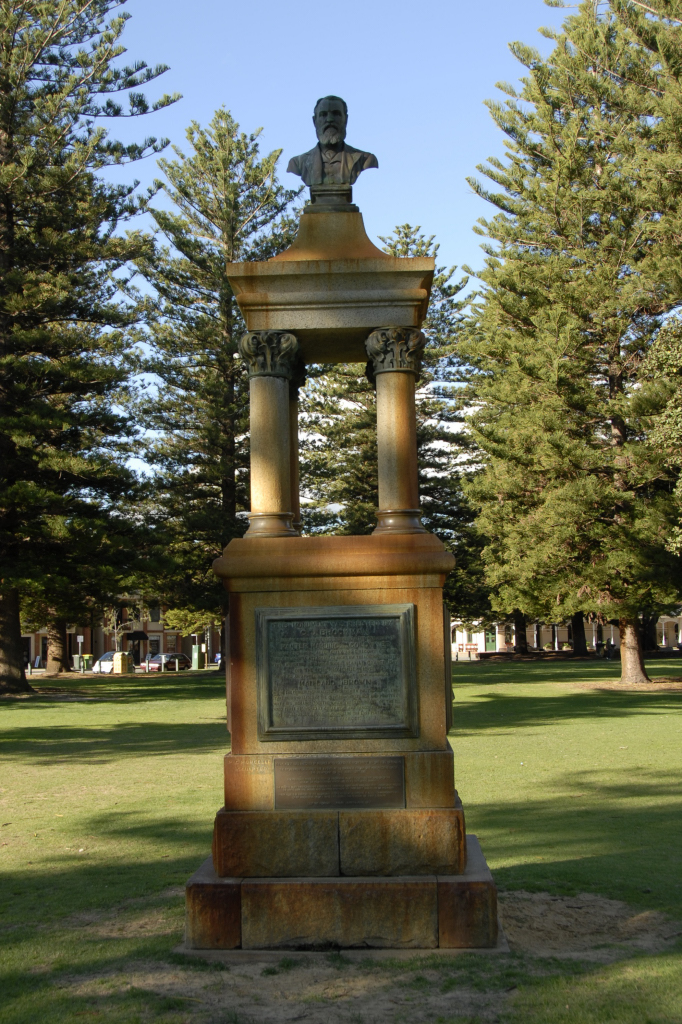
Amid a stand of trees in 2007

== History ==
Panter, Harding and Goldwyer were killed by Aboriginal people while exploring in the Kimberley region of Western Australia. When the men failed to return, Brown was commissioned to lead the La Grange expedition, which searched for the whereabouts of the missing men. Brown's party found the men speared to death, two of them evidently in their sleep. Shortly afterwards, between six and twenty Aboriginal persons were killed – highly controversially even at the time – by Brown's party and reported by Brown as a battle brought on by an Aboriginal ambush, but which has often since been characterised as a punitive massacre of Aboriginal people by white settlers. Indeed, the monument itself has plainly called the group of people that conducted the expedition and that it memorialises the "punitive party" for the past 113 years.

One of the original plaques on the pedestal reads as follows:

This monument was erected by G. J. Brockman as a fellow bush wanderer's tribute to the memory of Panter, Harding and Goldwyer. Earliest explorers after Grey and Gregory of this "Terra Incognita" [this "unknown land"], attacked at night by treacherous natives, were murdered at Boole Boola near Le Grange Bay on 13 November 1864. Also as an appreciative token of remembrance of Maitland Brown, one of the pioneer pastoralists and premier politicians of this state, intrepid leader of the government search and punitive party. His remains together with the sad relics of the ill fated three recovered at great risk and danger from the lone wilds repose under a public monument in the East Perth Cemetery "lest we forget."

=== Additional plaque ===
It has long been held that the monument is a racist work that presented – and continues to present – a biased interpretation of the events at La Grange because, for example, it celebrates the colonists "as intrepid pioneers" in contrast to the Aboriginal people that "are condemned as treacherous natives". In 1994, an attempt was made to redress this by placing an additional plaque on the monument. The new plaque commemorates all Aboriginal people who died during the invasion of their country, and reads as follows:

This plaque was erected by people who found the monument before you offensive. The monument described the events at La Grange from one perspective only: the viewpoint of the white 'settlers'. No mention is made of the right of Aboriginal people to defend their land or of the history of provocation which led to the explorers' deaths. The 'punitive party' mentioned here ended in the deaths of somewhere around twenty Aboriginal people. The whites were well-armed and equipped and none of their party was killed or wounded. This plaque is in memory of the Aboriginal people killed at La Grange. It also commemorates all other Aboriginal people who died during the invasion of their country. Lest we forget Mapa jarriya-nyalaku.

== See also ==
- Flying Foam massacre
- Forrest River massacre
- La Grange Bay, Western Australia
- Pinjarra massacre

== General references ==
- Scates, Bruce (1989). Layman, Lenore; Stannage, Tom (eds.). "A Monument to Murder: Celebrating the Conquest of Aboriginal Australia". Department of History. Studies in Western Australian History. Celebrations in Western Australian History. 10. Nedlands: University of Western Australia: 21–31. ISSN 0314-7525. OCLC 7128924424.
