= Maitland Brown =

Australian explorer, politician and pastoralist

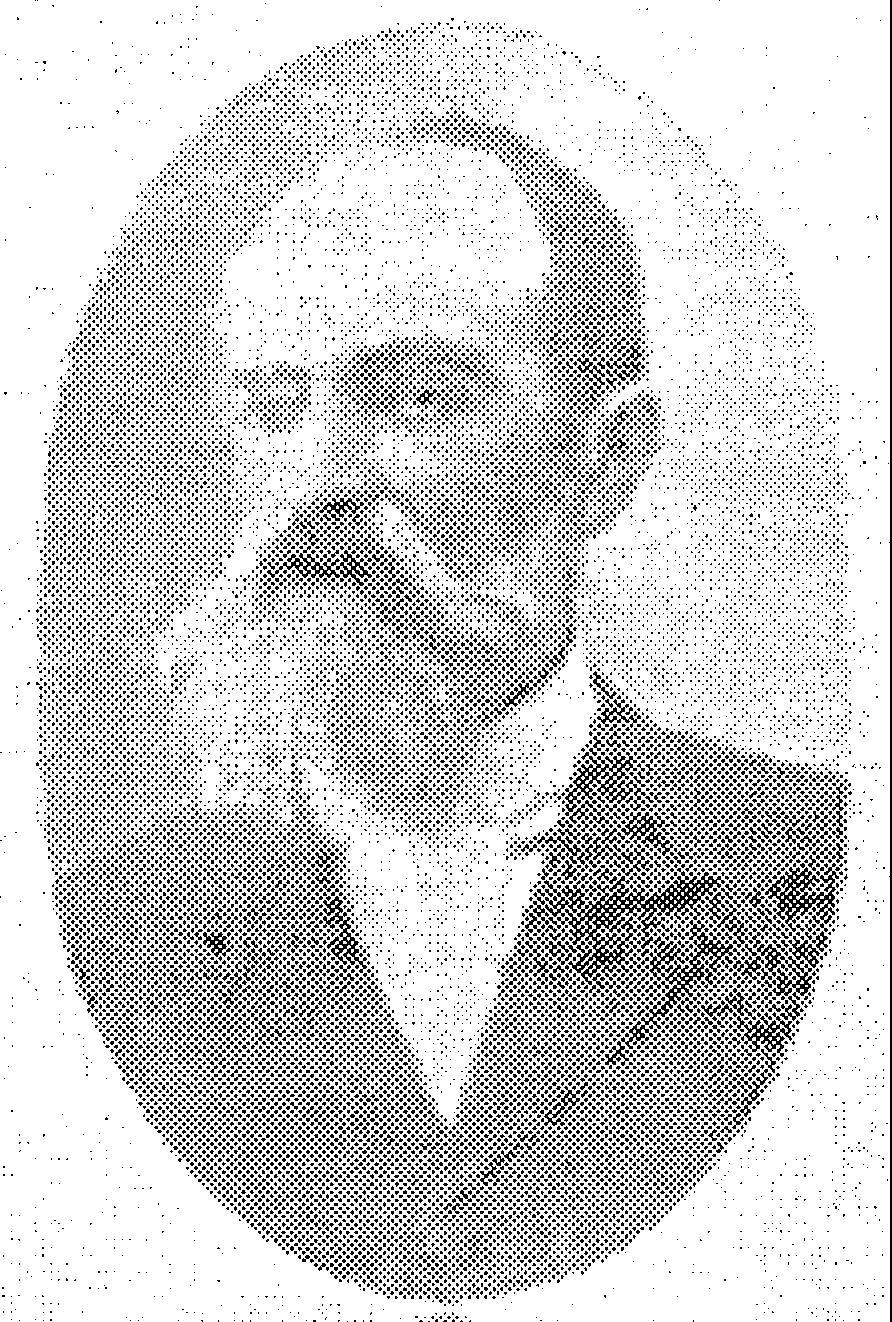

Maitland Brown (17 July 1843 – 8 July 1905) was an explorer, politician and pastoralist in colonial Western Australia. He is known as the leader of the La Grange expedition and massacre that remains controversial to this day. The expedition searched for and recovered the bodies of three colonists killed by Aboriginal Australians, and killed between six and twenty Aboriginal Australians.

== Early life ==
Maitland Brown was born on 17 July 1843 at Grassdale near York, Western Australia. The son of Thomas Brown and Eliza Brown, he was educated by his mother and tutors, and in 1858 was apprenticed to his brother Kenneth at Glengarry. He was supposed to learn sheep farming, but was more interested in horse breeding.

== Exploration ==
Brown was a volunteer member of the Francis Thomas Gregory's exploring expedition of 1861, which sailed to Nickol Bay, then explored first southward across the Hamersley Ranges to the Tropic of Capricorn, and later northward as far as the Oakover River. During the latter exploration the party suffered extreme danger from lack of water, and at one point Brown saved Gregory's life by riding back to the party's base camp and returning with a supply of water. The five-month expedition opened up large tracts of good pastoral land, but little with the potential to support agriculture.

In 1865, Maitland Brown was again part of an expedition to the north. The year before, three explorers, Frederick Panter, James Harding and William Goldwyer, had set out from Roebuck Bay to explore the area around La Grange Bay. The Panter-Harding-Goldwyer expedition had failed to return, and it was rumoured that they had been attacked. When the Government learned of the missing men, it organised a search expedition. Maitland Brown offered his services and was appointed leader of the expedition. The La Grange expedition left Fremantle in February 1865, and on 3 April it found the missing men dead. They had been speared and clubbed to death, at least two of them in their sleep. Shortly after the discovery of the dead men, the expedition party engaged in a protracted fight with a group of Karrijarri men. Between six and twenty people were killed, with no injuries or deaths to the expedition party. Brown's journal states that the party had walked into an ambush, but most historians have interpreted the event as a punitive attack by Brown's party and one of the plaques on the Maitland Brown Memorial that in part has commemorated the expedition for the past 113 years plainly calls Brown's party the "punitive party".

== Magisterial career ==
Brown was appointed a justice of the peace later that year, and in 1866 was made resident magistrate at Greenough. During his time in the position, he became involved in a protracted dispute with the Governor, John Hampton, and the Colonial Secretary Frederick Barlee. Brown declined to obey an instruction to reverse a minor legal decision he had made, essentially on the grounds that it was inappropriate for a magistrate to reverse a decision on the instruction of the Government: "I have yet to learn that a magistrate has any right to pursue a course which in his view is in opposition to Law upon the mere instructions of the Governor". Hampton was angered by Brown's repeated refusal to obey him, and by the "tone and tenor" of his letters, which he thought insolent. Brown eventually resigned over the issue, but in the meantime, Hampton's appointment had ended. Acting governor John Bruce, who agreed with Brown's legal position, smoothed the matter over, and Brown withdrew his resignation.

Brown was Resident Magistrate at Greenough until 1869, when he was appointed Government Resident and Resident Magistrate at Geraldton following the death of Alfred Durlacher. The following year a number of magisterial positions were reshuffled, and Brown was appointed Resident Magistrate at Bunbury. He was reluctant to take up the position, however, and took a long leave of absence. He still had not taken up the position in October 1870 when he was appointed to a nominee position on the Western Australian Legislative Council.

== In politics ==
The role of nominee members of the council was somewhat ambiguous at the time, there being some dispute over whether nominee members were obliged to vote with the government. Brown vigorously defended his right to vote according to his conscience, and did indeed vote against the government on a number of occasions. After Governor Weld dissolved the council in 1871, new elections were held in 1872, and Brown was not nominated to the new council. Although Weld denied that he expected his nominee members to support the government, the decision not to re-nominate Brown was widely seen as a sign that the government expected its nominee members to "toe the line".

In September 1874, Brown was elected unopposed to the Legislative Council's Geraldton seat, on a policy platform of opposition to responsible government. He had also nominated for the North District seat, but on his election in October 1874 chose to sit for Geraldton.

On 16 February 1875, Brown married Amy Frances Howard, with whom he had three sons and four daughters. In January 1876, Brown's brother Kenneth murdered his wife in a drunken argument. Maitland Brown was prominent in the family's unsuccessful attempt to mount a defence of diminished responsibility, sparing neither his personal privacy nor his standing in the community in the failed attempt to save his brother from execution. Perceiving that his standing in the community had been damaged by the trial, Brown resigned his seat in the council in March. He was persuaded to renominate, however, and was re-elected unopposed on 22 July.

Brown's views changed markedly during his later years in the Legislative Council. Whereas he had earlier argued against the necessity of an "opposition", he later became himself firmly opposed to the government. He became an outspoken critic of nearly every government measure, and was especially critical of Governor Robinson. For a time he was widely recognised as the Leader of the Opposition, although on at least one occasion he repudiated the title. Brown's views on responsible government also changed. He had been one of the colony's staunchest opponents of responsible government, but by 1883 he had declared himself a supporter of the proposed change. Having been elected on a policy platform of opposition to responsible government, Brown considered it inappropriate to retain his seat after changing his opinion, so in April 1883 he resigned the seat of Geraldton for the second time. A few weeks later he was elected to the new seat of Gascoyne, which he held until his resignation in April 1886.

== Later life ==
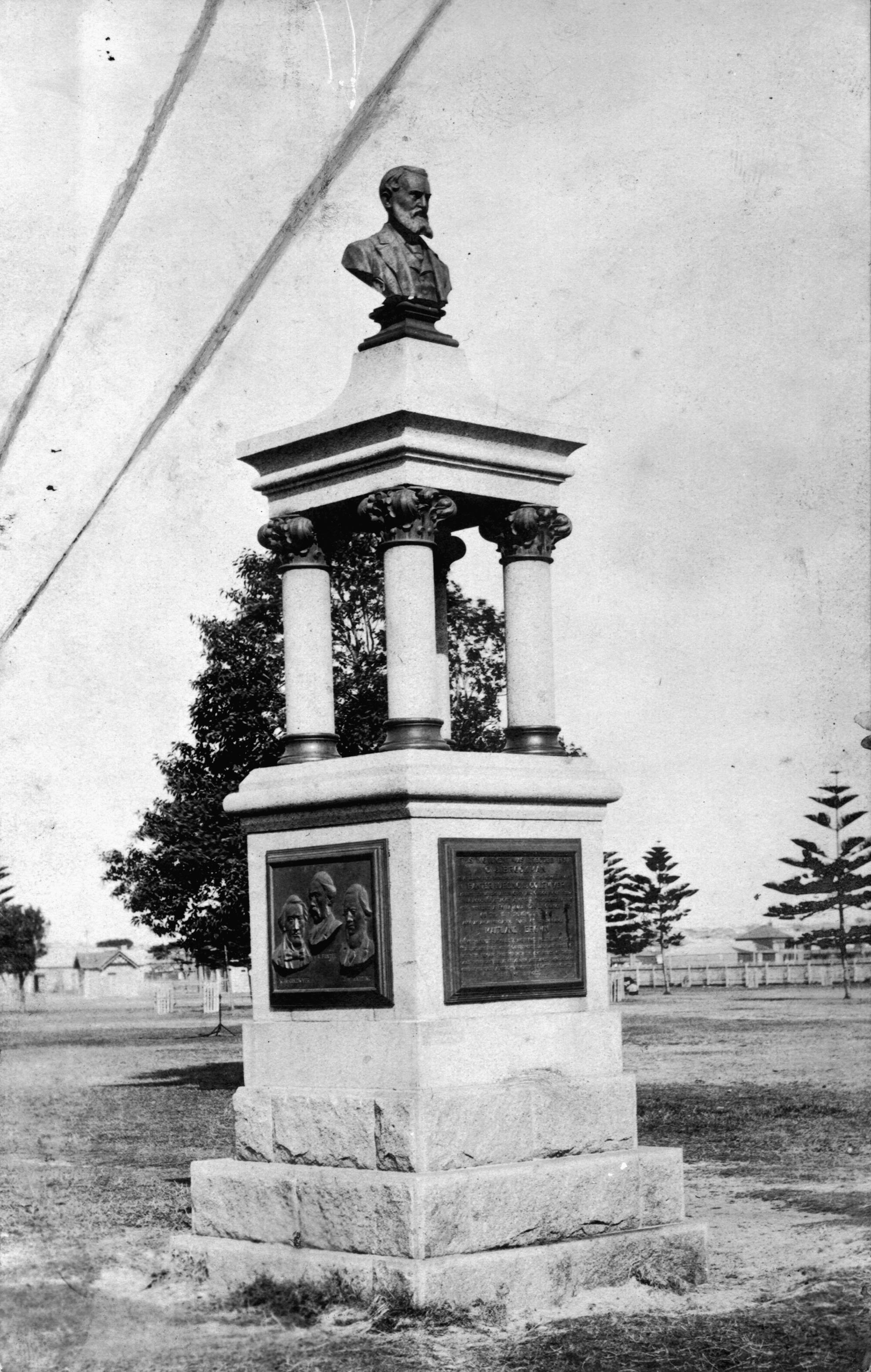
The Explorers' Monument

On 7 April 1886, Brown resigned his seat in the Legislative Council for the last time. He then accepted a re-appointment to the position of Resident Magistrate at Geraldton. He remained in the position until his retirement from public life in 1904, nominally on grounds of ill health, but possibly due to his wife's alcoholism. Brown's wife died in early 1905, and shortly afterwards, on 8 May, Brown himself died in Perth. He was buried at Karrakatta Cemetery, but in 1911 his remains were re-interred with the remains of Panter, Harding and Goldwyer in East Perth Cemeteries. In 1912, a monument to Brown was erected on the Fremantle Esplanade.
