= List of heritage places in the Shire of York =

This is a list of heritage sites on the State Register of Heritage Places within the Shire of York in Western Australia but not within the York town site.

Place no.	Place name	Notes	Street name	Location	Image
2817	St Peter's (Anglican) Church		Off Great Southern Hwy	Gilgering	
2819	Greenhills Post Office (fmr)	Residence		Greenhills	
2821	St Andrew's Anglican Church & Cemetery, Greenhills		Quairading Rd	Greenhills	
4184	Korrawilla Homestead Group	Greenhills Farm, Korrawilla	York & Quairading Rd	Greenhills	
2822	Greenhills Tavern	Railway Hotel	Greenhills Rd	Greenhills	
5964	Farmhouse		Doodenanning Rd	Greenhills	
2820	Shop (fmr)			Greenhills	
2818	Greenhills Hall		Greenhills Rd	Greenhills	
25477	Quairading-York Road Bridge, Kauring	MRWA Bridge 0591	Quairading-York Rd	Kauring	
25474	Needling Brook Road Bridge, Mount Hardey	MRWA Bridge 0582	Quairading-York Rd	Mount Hardey	
25475	Sims Brook Road Bridge, Mount Hardey	MRWA Bridge 0583	Quairading-York Rd	Mount Hardey	
25476	Lodges Crossing Road Bridge, Mount Hardey	MRWA Bridge 0584	Quairading-York Rd	Mount Hardey	
25664	Charcoal Burner Site, Mount Observation			Mount Observation	
13799	Tipperary Farm		Burges Siding Rd	Quellington	
4183	St Ronan's Well, York	St Ronan's Well and Conservation Area	Great Southern Hwy	St Ronans	
2904	Tipperary School ruins		Northam Rd	Tipperary	
5988	Tipperary Church	St Pauls	Northam Rd	Tipperary	
