= James Harding (explorer) =

British-Australian pastoralist and explorer

- Born: 1838; England
- Died: 13 November 1864 (aged 25–26); Lagrange Bay, Australia
- Cause of death: Murder
- Occupations: Explorer, pastoralist
- Known for: Killed in the La Grange Massacre

James Harding (1838 – 13 November 1864) was a British-Australian pastoralist and explorer in colonial Western Australia. While exploring in the Kimberley region in 1864, he was killed by Aboriginal Australians. In February 1913, a monument to Panter, Harding, Goldwyer and Brown, the Explorers' Monument, was unveiled in Fremantle.

== Early life ==
Born in England in 1838, James Harding emigrated to Western Australia with his family on Dromo in 1846. He relocated to England in 1848 but returned to Western Australia in 1850.

== Career ==
In 1859, he was farming in York with Charles Wittenoom. In April 1861, Harding volunteered to join an expedition to the Pilbara region of Western Australia, under Francis Gregory. The five-month-long expedition discovered large amounts of poor pastoral land around the De Grey River. In March 1864, an expedition to Camden Harbor was undertaken to test the claims of a convict, Henry Wildman, who claimed to have found gold there many years earlier. No gold was found, but large areas of good pastoral land were discovered around Roebuck Bay.

A company, the Roebuck Bay Pastoral and Agricultural Association Ltd, was formed to establish sheep stations in the area. James Harding was chosen as manager, and in October 1864 he joined an advance party that sailed to the area.

== Death ==
In November 1864, Harding, along with Frederick Panter and William Goldwyer set out from the camp at Roebuck Bay to explore the area around Lagrange Bay. They did not return, and eventually a search party under Maitland Brown was sent to find them. Brown's La Grange expedition party eventually found the three men dead, having been clubbed and speared to death. It has been claimed that Panter and Harding were killed in their sleep, while Goldwyer was keeping watch. The bodies were returned to Perth, where thousands attended their public funeral.

== General references ==
- Erickson, Rica, ed. (1979). Dictionary of Western Australians 1829–1914. Vol. 4 pt. 1, A-K. The challenging years, 1868–1888. Nedlands, Western Australia: University of Western Australia Press. ISBN 0-85564-163-0.
- Forrest, Kay (1996). The Challenge and the Chance: The Colonisation and Settlement of North West Australia 1861–1914. Victoria Park, Western Australia: Hesperian Press. ISBN 0-85905-217-6.
