= William Goldwyer =

Police officer and explorer in Western Australia

William Goldwyer (August 1829 – 13 November 1864) was a police officer and explorer in colonial Western Australia. While exploring in the Kimberley region of Western Australia in 1864, he was killed by Aboriginal Australians.

== Biography ==
Born in England in August 1829, William Goldwyer emigrated to Western Australia and was appointed a night warder to the Convict Establishment in March 1853. From 1855 to 1857 he was a mounted constable at Dandaragan, and later became Sergeant of Police there. Fluent in Aboriginal languages and renowned for his bushcraft, he often undertook the dangerous task of carrying the monthly mail from Perth to Champion Bay. In November 1859 Goldwyer married Marie Antonia Kellam. At the time of his marriage he was described as a master mariner.

In 1864 Goldwyer was selected to assist members of a private venture, the Roebuck Bay Association, in establishing a new settlement in the Roebuck Bay area. Shortly after arriving in the area, Goldwyer set out with Frederick Panter and James Harding to explore around La Grange. The Panter, Harding and Goldwyer expedition of 1864 did not return, and eventually a search party under Maitland Brown was sent to find them. Brown's La Grange expedition party eventually found the three men dead, having been clubbed and speared to death. It has been claimed that Panter and Harding were killed in their sleep, while Goldwyer was keeping watch.

The bodies of Panter, Harding and Goldwyer were returned to Perth, where thousands of spectators attended their public funeral. In February 1913, a monument to Brown and the three killed men, the Explorers' Monument, was unveiled in Fremantle.
