= Frederick Panter =

Police officer, pastoralist and explorer in Western Australia

Frederick Kennedy Panter (1836 – 13 November 1864) was a police officer, pastoralist and explorer in colonial Western Australia. While exploring in the Kimberley region of Western Australia in 1864, he was killed by Aboriginal Australians.

== Biography ==
Born in 1836, Frederick Panter was a relative (Note: Some sources say nephew, others cousin.) of Governor of Western Australia Sir Arthur Kennedy. Little is known of his early life, except that he was a police constable in Queensland, came to Western Australia, and by 1861 was Perth's Inspector of Police.

In 1864, Panter and the naturalist Dr James Martin led an official expedition to investigate claims made by a convict, Henry Wildman, who reported finding gold near Camden Harbour (close to the northern tip of the Kimberley region), eight years earlier. On arrival in the area, Wildman became sullen and uncooperative, and tried to escape. While no gold was found, the expedition reinforced Martin and Kenneth Brown's previous (1863) discovery of pastoral land around both Camden Harbour and Roebuck Bay.

A public company, the Roebuck Bay Company (RBC), had already been formed to establish a chain of sheep stations in the area, and Panter was attached to an RBC advance party that sailed to Cape Villaret, later in 1864, to set up a station. The following month, Panter, along with James Harding and William Goldwyer, set out from the base camp on an expedition to explore the area to the south, around La Grange Bay. The expedition did not return, and a few months later, a special search party under Maitland Brown was sent from Perth to find them. Brown's party eventually found the three men dead, having been clubbed and speared to death, following a series of clashes with Karajarri people. Brown and his expedition also killed a number of Karajarri people in the area.

The bodies of Panter, Harding and Goldwyer were returned to Perth, where thousands of spectators attended their public funeral. In February 1913, a monument to Brown and the three murdered men, the Explorers' Monument, was unveiled in Fremantle.

At the time of Panter's death, he was engaged to marry Georgiana, daughter of John and Georgiana Molloy.

== General references ==
- Erickson, Rica, ed. (1979). Dictionary of Western Australians 1829–1914. Nedlands, Western Australia: University of Western Australia Press. ISBN 0-85564-163-0.
- Forrest, Kay (1996). The Challenge and the Chance: The Colonisation and Settlement of North West Australia 1861–1914. Victoria Park, Western Australia: Hesperian Press. ISBN 0-85905-217-6.
