= Charles Wittenoom =

Australian politician

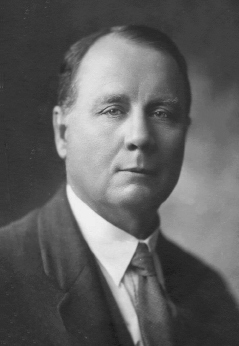
Charles Wittenoom

Charles Horne Wittenoon (6 December 1879 – 18 September 1969) was an Australian politician. He was a Member of the Western Australian Legislative Council for twelve years.

Born in Geraldton, Western Australia on 6 December 1879, he was the son of squatter and station agent Sir Edward Wittenoom, and a nephew of Frank Wittenoom, after whom the ghost town of Wittenoom was named. He was educated at High School (now Hale School) in Perth, then went to England to complete his studies at Malvern College and the Royal School of Mines in London. On returning to Western Australia he became manager of Central and West Boulder Mines at Kalgoorlie. By 1909 he was owner of Muralgarra Station at Yalgoo. On 9 June 1909 he married Bessie Sholl, daughter of Robert Sholl; they had one son and two daughters.

Wittenoom was widowed in October 1919. From the early 1920s he lived in Albany, Western Australia, where he invested in property including several hotels, and became director of WA Woollen Mills. On 17 September 1923 he married Constance Patricia Hanrahan, with whom he had two sons and a daughter, Jacqueline (1927–2016), who married the Irish racehorse trainer Vincent O'Brien. He became active in public affairs, serving as mayor of Albany Municipal Council from 1923 to 1931 (with a brief break in 1926), and again from 1940 to 1952. On 22 May 1928 he was elected to the Western Australian Legislative Council for the South-East Province. He held the seat until the election of 11 May 1940, when he was defeated by Hugh Roche. In later life he retired to Claremont, where he died on 18 September 1969. He was buried in Karrakatta Cemetery.
