= Pietro Porcelli =

Australian sculptor

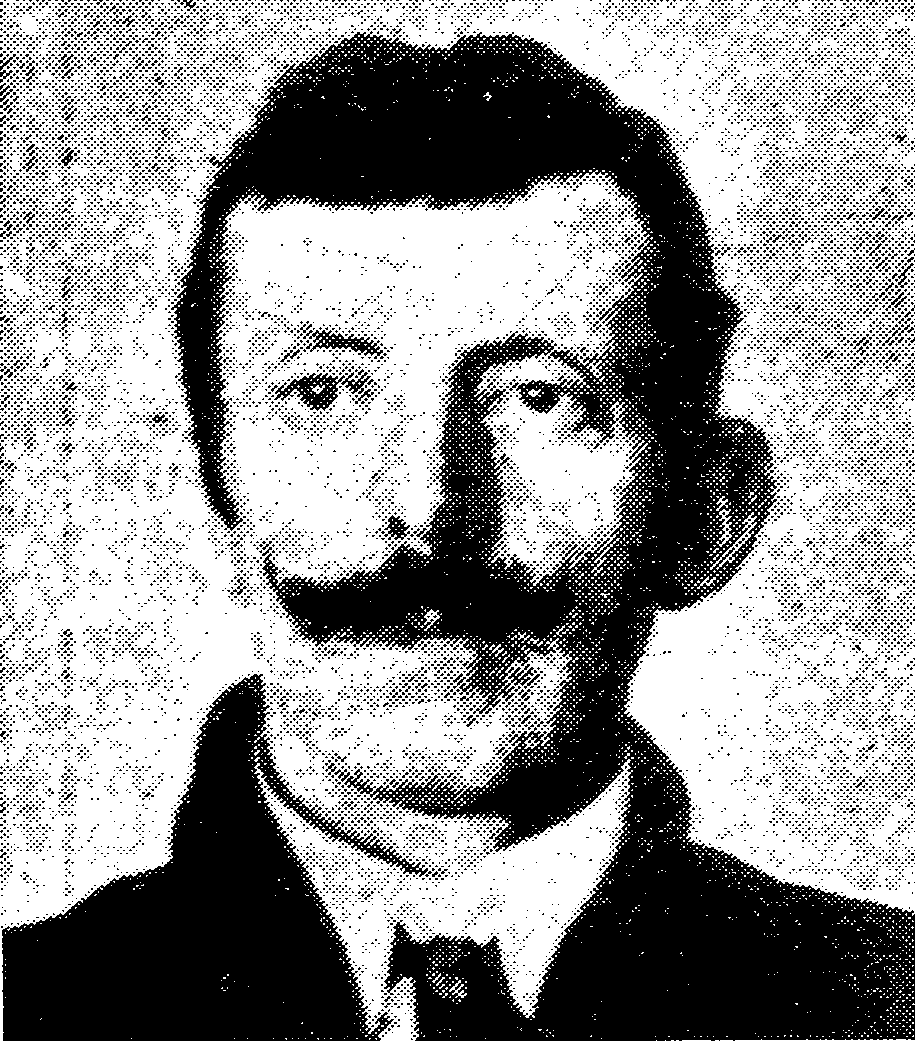
Pietro Porcelli

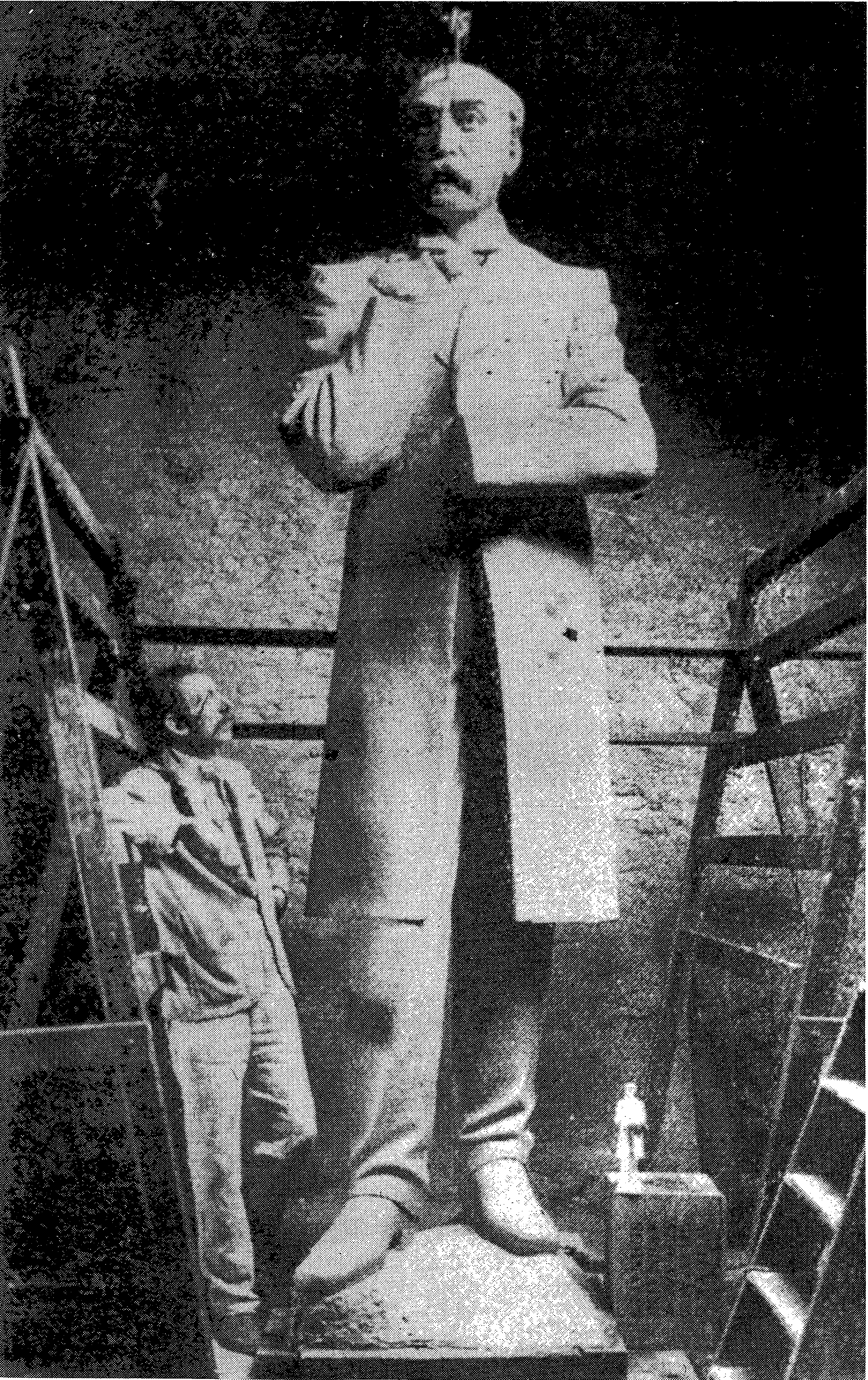
Porcelli working on a statue of C. Y. O'Connor, 1910 or 1911.

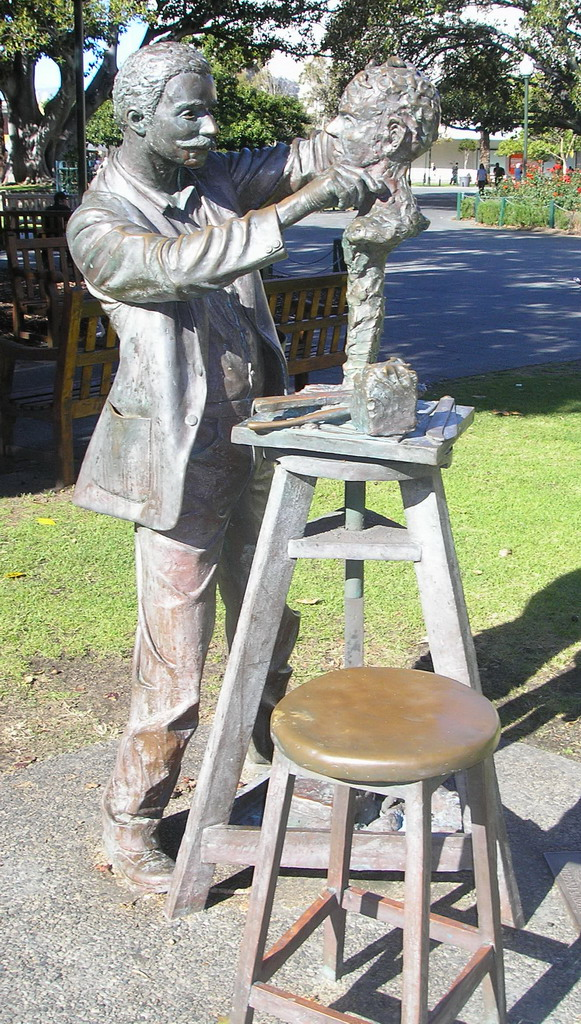
A bronze statue of Porcelli by Perth artist Greg James was unveiled in Kings Square, Fremantle, in 1993.

Pietro Giacomo Porcelli (30 January 1872 – 28 June 1943) was an Italian-born sculptor responsible for many statues in Western Australia, including the Explorers' Monument, and those of C. Y. O'Connor and Alexander Forrest.

== Biography ==
Born in Bisceglie in the province of Bari, he moved to Sydney with his fisherman father at the age of 8. After initial training at the New South Wales Academy of Art, he furthered his study of sculpture and drawing in Naples, before returning to Fremantle with his father in 1898. Later that year, he completed his first commission – a bust of Sir John Forrest that now stands in the main entrance hall of Parliament House in Perth. His 1902 statue of Alexander Forrest was the first such statue of a prominent public figure to be completed in Perth. In 1915 he also created the 3.7 metre bronze statue of Eirene and attendants which stood atop the seven-storey AMP Chambers at the corner of St George's Terrace and William Street, which was removed when the building was demolished in 1972 and now stands on a man-made lake in the suburb of Floreat Waters.

Porcelli also completed war memorials in Kalgoorlie, Boulder, Victoria Park, West Leederville and Moora, and numerous headstones in Karrakatta and Fremantle Cemeteries, including that of Sir John Forrest in 1918.

After a period of work in Melbourne in the 1920s, he returned to Perth in 1939, where he died in 1943. He is buried in Karrakatta Cemetery.

== Major works ==
Subject	Work	Location	Year
Sir John Forrest	bust	Parliament House (Forrest Foyer)	1898
Alexander Forrest	statue	Stirling Gardens, Perth	1902
C. Y. O'Connor	bust	Mundaring Weir	1907
Sir James Lee-Steere	bust	Parliament House (Lee Steere Foyer)	1909
C. Y. O'Connor	statue	Fremantle Harbour	1911
Explorers' Monument	monument	Fremantle	1913
Australian Mutual Provident Society	bronze emblem	Perth (now moved to Floreat Waters)	1925
Frederick Henry Piesse	statue	Katanning	1916
Head of Christ	alto-relief marble	exterior of St Patrick's Church, Fremantle	
Peace	bronze	Midland Railway Workshops	
12-panel frieze	freestone	Sanctuary, Shrine of Remembrance, Melbourne	

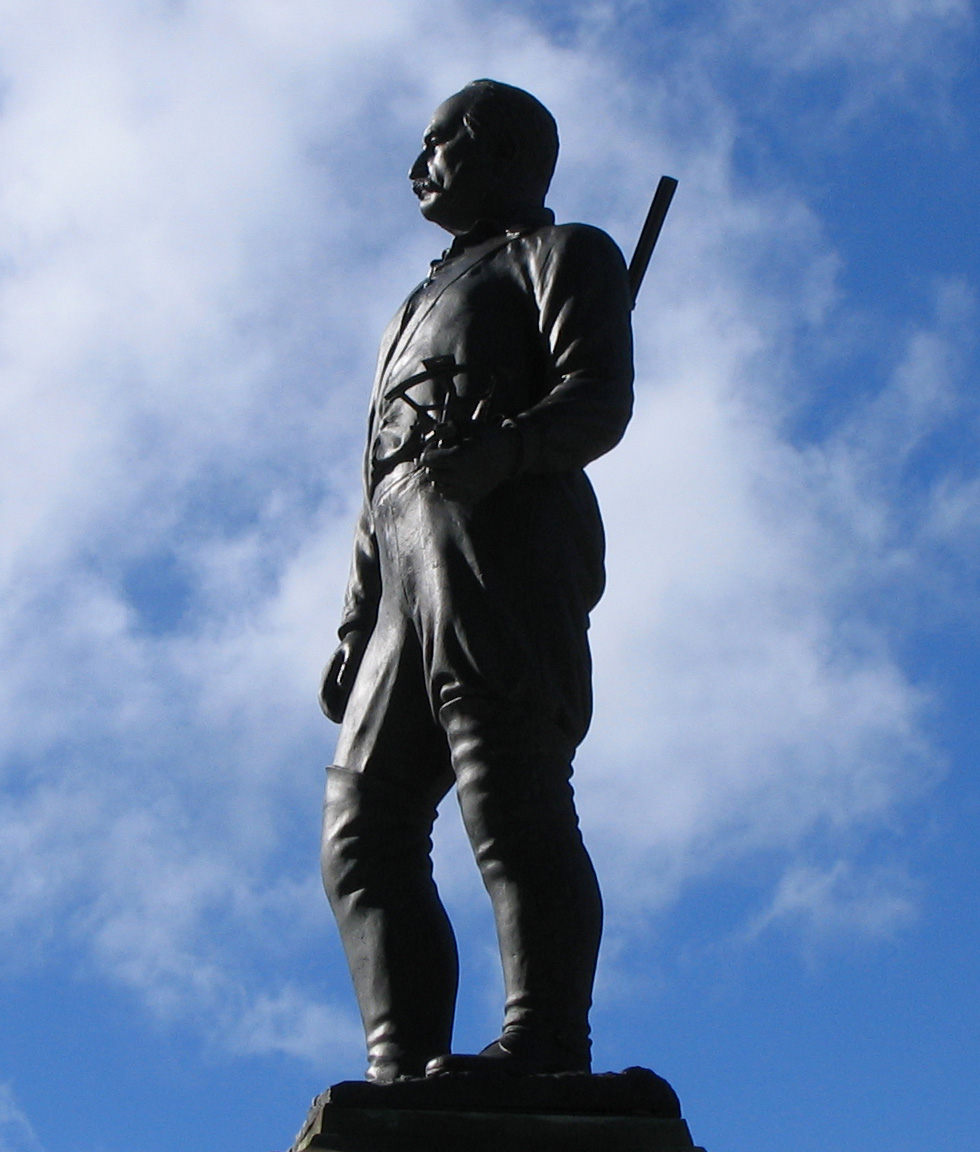
Alexander Forrest

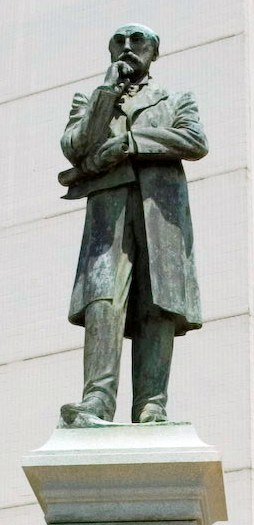
C. Y. O'Connor statue

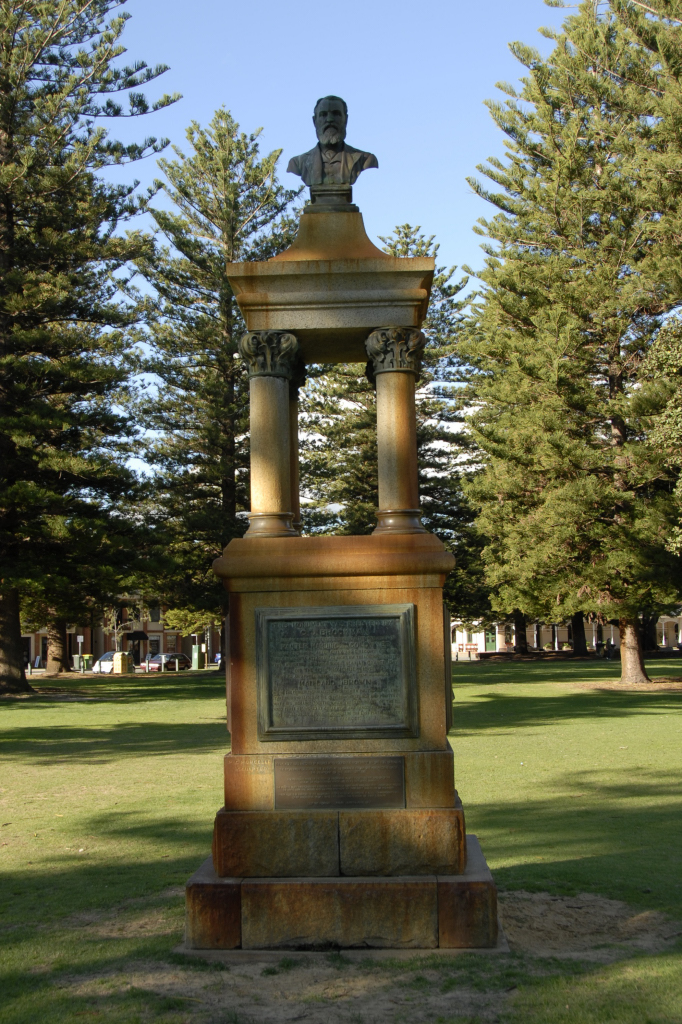
Explorers' Monument

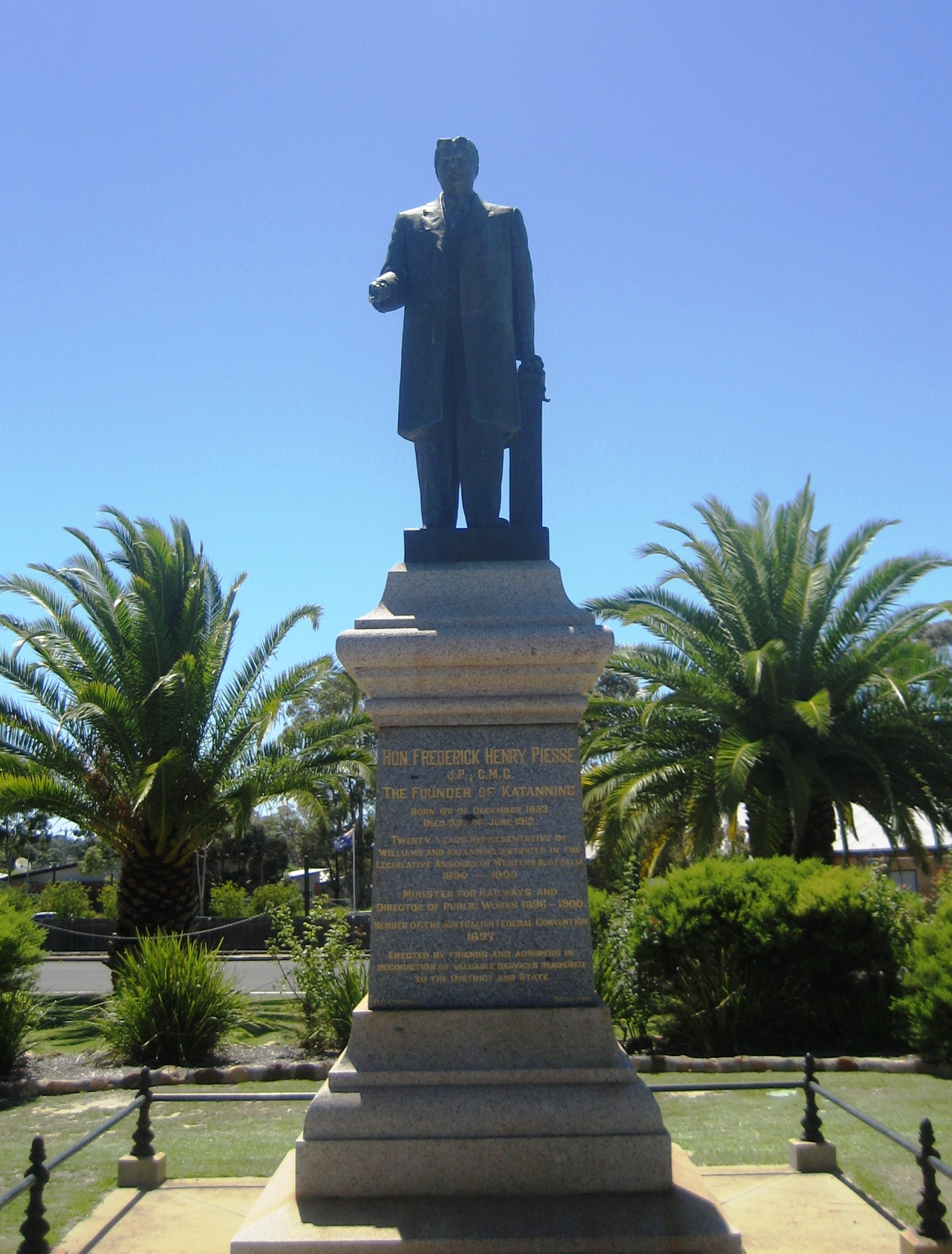
Frederick Henry Piesse

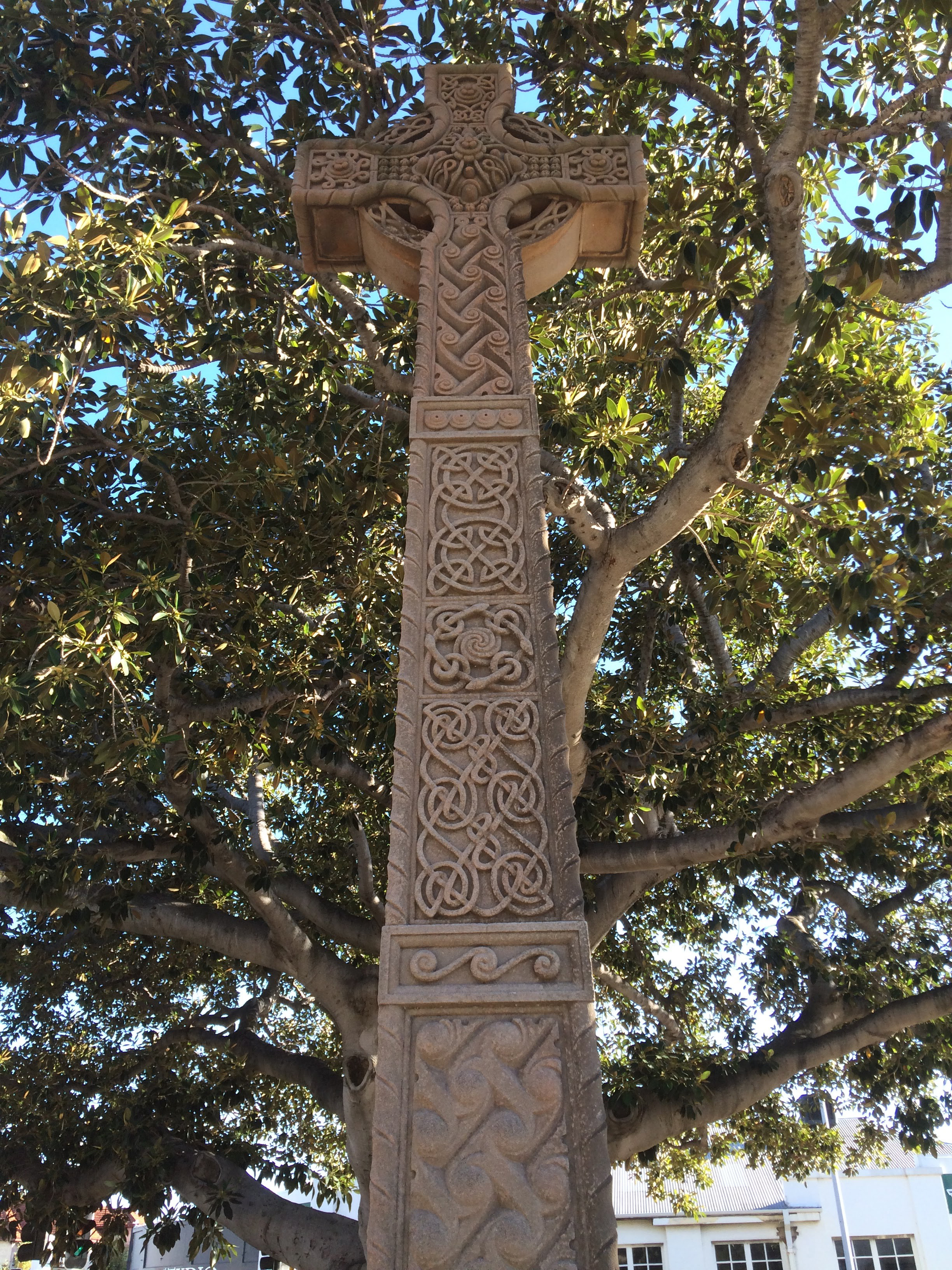
Celtic cross monument to William Marmion

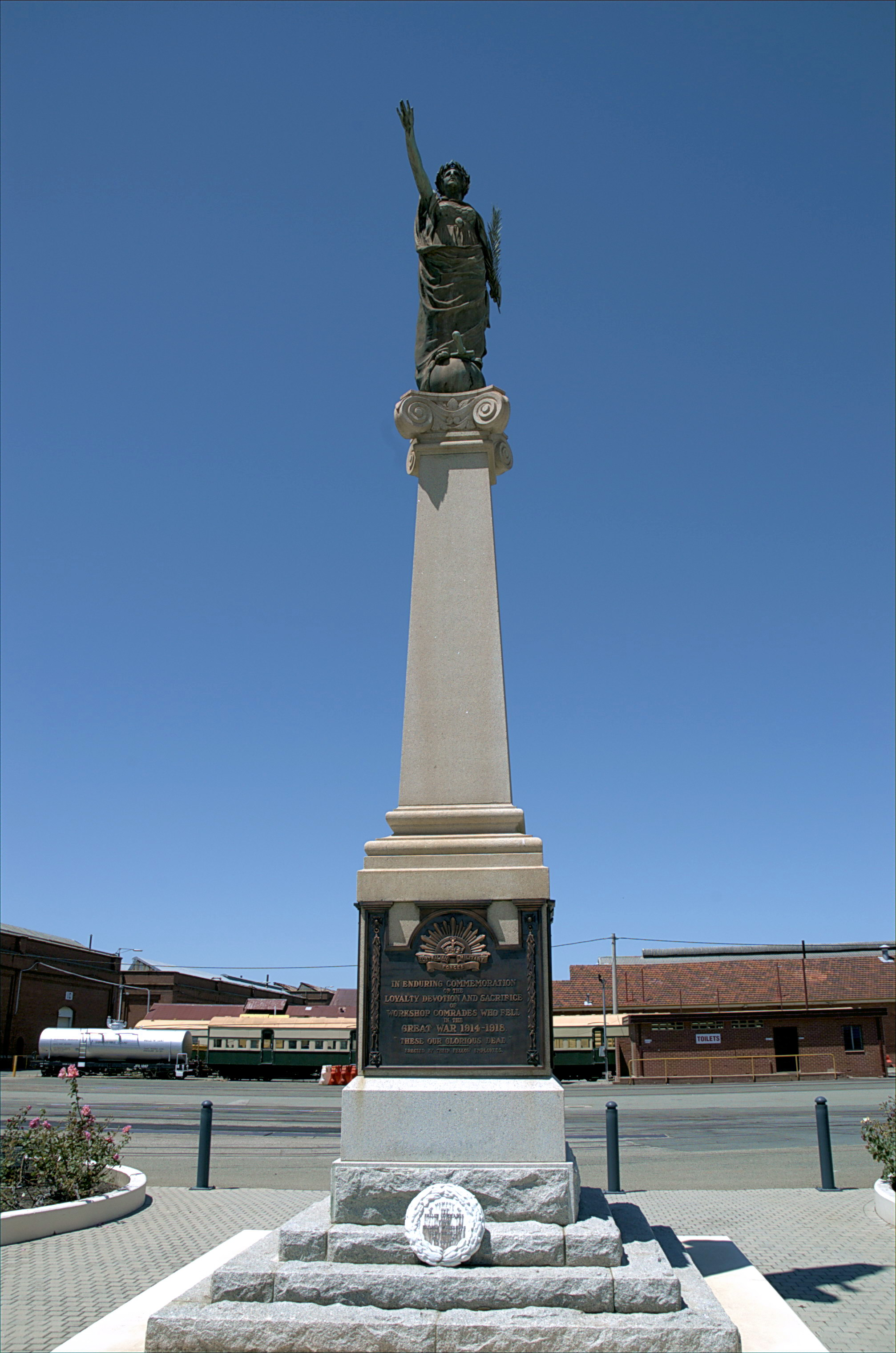
Peace

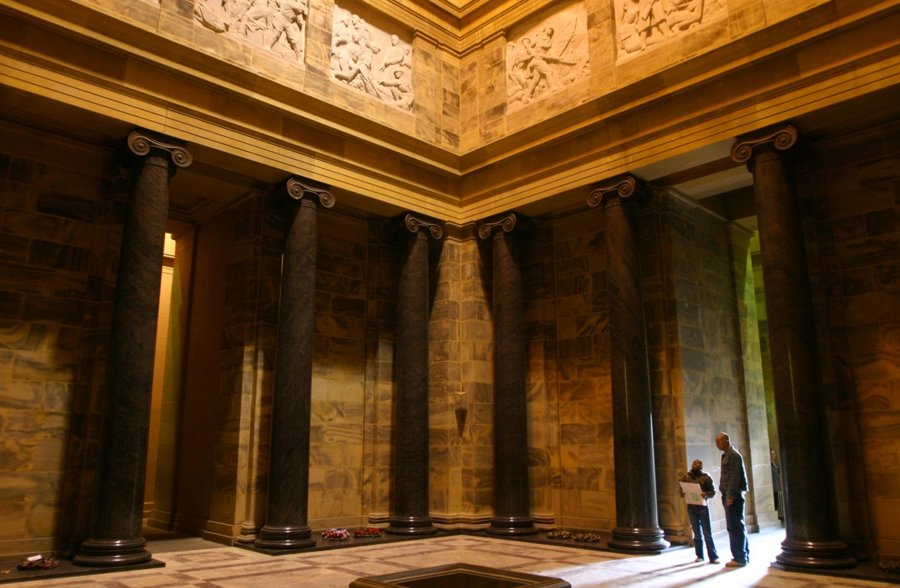
12-panel frieze
