= Henry Wildman =

Convict transported to Western Australia

Henry Wildman (born c. 1837; date of death unknown) was a convict transported to Western Australia, whose claims to have found gold in the Kimberley region prompted exploration of the area during 1864. However, Wildman declined to provide the exact location and no gold was found. Little is known of Wildman's origins, or his life after 1864.

== Biography ==
Convict records state that Wildman was literate, a Protestant, and a labourer prior to his conviction. He was said to have been 25 years old on 18 March 1862, when he was found guilty of burglary and sentenced to 18 years' penal servitude in Derby, England. (Some contemporary sources reported, incorrectly, that he had been sentenced to 15 years in 1861.)

Wildman arrived in Western Australia on Lord Dalhousie on 28 December 1863. Two days after his arrival, Perth daily newspaper The Inquirer quoted Wildman as claiming that, on an early visit to Western Australia, he had found gold in the Camden Harbour area. In 1856, according to Wildman, he had been first mate on a Dutch ship, Maria Augusta, sailing from Rotterdam to Java, when it was forced to stop in for rudder repairs. He had allegedly travelled up a river that drained into Camden Harbour, and found alluvial gold nuggets. After returning to England, according to Wildman, he had sold these nuggets in Liverpool for £416.

He offered to lead a party to the area, in return for a remission of his sentence. Some later sources, such as History of West Australia have suggested, without citing sources, that Wildman's claims were supported by a gold dealer in England. An exploring expedition to the area was launched, under the leadership of Police Inspector Frederick Panter and Dr James Martin. This expedition sailed from Fremantle on 2 March 1864. On arrival at Camden Harbour, Wildman became sullen and hostile, refusing to give any further information about the location of the gold. In his journal of the expedition, Panter mentions Wildman having an epileptic seizure, and reports having him put in irons for insolent conduct. Wildman later tried to escape, but was unsuccessful. No gold was found, but the expedition found good land that was later settled.

Following the failed expedition, Wildman is known to have completed his sentence. He is thought to have then left Western Australia, but neither the date nor his destination are known.

== General references ==
- Battye, James Sykes (March 2005) [1924]. Asscher, Sue (ed.). Western Australia: A History from its Discovery to the Inauguration of the Commonwealth. Project Gutenberg of Australia. Wikidata Q126159134.
- Forrest, Kay (1996). The Challenge and the Chance: The Colonisation and Settlement of North West Australia 1861–1914. Victoria Park, Western Australia: Hesperian Press. ISBN 0-85905-217-6.
- Kimberly, Warren Bert, ed. (1897). History of West Australia . Melbourne: F. W. Niven. p. 205 – via Wikisource.
- Erickson, Rica and Gillian O'Mara (1994). Convicts in Western Australia, 1850–1887. Nedlands, Western Australia: University of Western Australia Perth. ISBN 1-875560-44-0.
- Uren, Malcolm (1946). Research Note 39, State Library of Western Australia.
