= Frank Wittenoom =

Australian explorer (1855–1939)

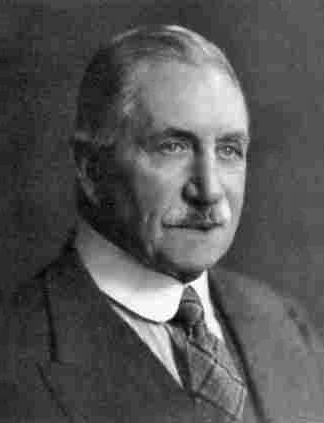
- Born: Frederick Francis Burdett Wittenoom; 17 December 1855; York, Western Australia
- Died: 11 September 1939 (aged 83); Perth, Western Australia, Australia
- Occupation: Pastoralist
- Relatives: John Burdett Wittenoom (grandfather); Edward Wittenoom (brother)

Frederick Francis Burdett Wittenoom (17 December 1855 – 11 September 1939) was an explorer and pastoralist in Western Australia.

== Biography ==
=== Early life ===
Frank Wittenoom was born in York, Western Australia in 1855. He was the grandson of John Burdett Wittenoom, one of the first chaplains in the Swan River Colony. His brother was Sir Edward Charles (Horne) Wittenoom, a member of the Western Australian Legislative Council for 34 years.

=== Career ===
He took up farming in Western Australia. Additionally, he was the first European to explore much of the Murchison, Gascoyne and Pilbara areas of the north-west of Western Australia.

He built a Queen Anne style house in Perth, called "The Terraces", in the late 1890s and extended it in 1900. In 1987, the house was classified by the National Trust of Australia and has been added to the State Register of Heritage Places.

=== Death and legacy ===
Wittenoom never married. He died in Perth, Western Australia, aged 83. The former town of Wittenoom, Western Australia, was named after him by Lang Hancock, with whom he shared a nearby pastoral lease.
