= John Burdett Wittenoom =

Settler of Western Australia

- Born: 24 October 1788; Newark-on-Trent, Nottinghamshire, England
- Died: 23 January 1855 (aged 66); Perth, Western Australia, Australia
- Resting place: East Perth Cemeteries
- Occupations: Clergyman; Teacher
- Known for: Colonial Chaplain 1829-1855
- Relatives: Edith Cowan (granddaughter); Frank Wittenoom (grandson); Edward Wittenoom (grandson)

John Burdett Wittenoom (24 October 1788 – 23 January 1855) was a colonial clergyman who was the second Anglican clergyman to perform religious services in the Swan River Colony, Australia, soon after its establishment in 1829.

== Biography ==
=== Early life ===
John Burdett Wittenoom was born in England at Newark-on-Trent, Nottinghamshire. He was educated at Winchester College and matriculated to Brasenose College, Oxford in 1807, graduating B.A. in 1810, M.A. in 1813. He was ordained deacon in the Church of England in 1811, priest in 1812.

=== Career ===
He took up teaching in England where he was appointed headmaster of Newark Grammar School. Shortly after his first wife's death, he decided to emigrate to Western Australia arriving on Wanstead in January 1830 with his mother, sister and four sons.

He singlehandedly conducted services alternately every Sunday at Perth, Guildford and Fremantle until 1836.

In later years, he ran a grammar school and pursued his interest in education. In 1847, he was appointed to the colony's first education committee and was the inaugural chairman for eight years after it became the Board of Education. After his death in 1855, his second wife and daughter took charge of the government girls' school.

=== Personal life ===
His first wife died when they were still living in England. Together, they had five sons, including John Burdett, Henry, Frederick Dirck, and Charles. In 1839, he remarried in Australia. His daughter Mary was the mother of Edith Cowan, while another daughter, Augusta, married Thomas Burges (a member of parliament). The progeny of Wittenoom's fifth son, Charles Wittenoom, became notable individuals in the history of Western Australia.

=== Death ===
He died on 23 January 1855. A tablet in his memory is in St George's Cathedral, Perth.
