= Lagrange Bay =

- Town
- Interactive map of Lagrange Bay
- Coordinates: 18.68442°S 121.77748°E
- Country: Australia
- State: Western Australia
- LGA: Shire of Broome
- Location: 190 km (120 mi) S of Broome, Western Australia

Government
  - State electorate: Kimberley
  - Federal division: Durack

Population
  - Total: 617 (2016 census)
- Postcode: 6725

Lagrange Bay is a coastal locality about 200 kilometres (120 mi) southwest of Broome, Western Australia in the Kimberley region. It is the site of the Catholic Pallottine La Grange Mission, and the Aboriginal community of Bidyadanga.

== History ==
Lagrange Bay was named in 1801 by the Baudin expedition to Australia after Italian-French mathematician Joseph-Louis Lagrange (1736–1813).

It was the location of the 1865 La Grange expedition, which found three men dead, having been speared and clubbed to death by Aboriginal people, and the subsequent massacre of Aboriginal people by the expedition party.
