= Colebatch ministry =

14th Ministry of the Government of Western Australia

The Colebatch Ministry was the 14th Ministry of the Government of Western Australia and was led by Nationalist Premier Hal Colebatch. It succeeded the Lefroy Ministry on 17 April 1919 after Sir Henry Lefroy's resignation as premier. Colebatch, a member of the Legislative Council and the first (and so far only) from that chamber to ever be asked to form a ministry, had the problem of finding a conveniently-located country seat which was not held by the Country Party. Before he could consolidate his leadership, his handling of the "Battle of the Barricades" on the waterfront severely damaged his standing and he stood aside. On 17 May 1919, the First Mitchell Ministry was formed by the Minister for Lands, James Mitchell.

The following ministers served for the duration of the Ministry:

Office	Minister
Premier; Colonial Treasurer; Minister for Education; Minister for Railways	Hal Colebatch, MLC
Minister for Lands	James Mitchell, MLA
Colonial Secretary	Charles Hudson, MLA
Minister for Works; Minister for Water Supply	William George, MLA
Attorney-General; Minister for Mines; Minister for Forests; Minister for Industries	Robert Robinson, MLA
Minister for Agriculture	Charles Baxter, MLC
Minister without portfolio	Francis Willmott, MLA

Legend:

Nationalist Party
Country Party
National Labor Party

Preceded by Lefroy Ministry	Colebatch Ministry; 1919	Succeeded by First Mitchell Ministry
