= James ministry =

The James Ministry was the sixth Ministry of the Government of Western Australia and was led by Premier Walter James. It succeeded the Second Leake Ministry on 1 July 1902 following the death of the previous Premier, George Leake, on 24 June 1902. The Ministry relied on Independent and Labour support, and the former Ministerial faction opposing them gradually dissolved with members either associating with the new Government or sitting as independents.

At the 1904 election, Labor obtained three seats short of a majority, and when Parliament met, James's government fell on a vote of no confidence when four independents decided to back Labor's Henry Daglish to form government. The Daglish Ministry was sworn in on 10 August 1904.

The members of the James Ministry were:

Office	Minister
Premier; Attorney-General	Walter James, MLA
Colonial Secretary	Walter Kingsmill, MLA
Minister for Mines	Henry Gregory, MLA
Minister for Lands	Adam Jameson, MLC (until 23 January 1903)
Minister for Lands	John Marquis Hopkins, MLA (from 17 February 1903)
Colonial Treasurer	James Gardiner, MLA (until 20 April 1904)
Commissioner of Railways; Minister for Works (until 28 April 1904); Colonial Treasurer (from 20 April 1904)	Hector Rason, MLA
Minister without portfolio	Matthew Moss, MLC (13 August 1902 – 10 March 1904)
Minister without portfolio (25 January 1904 – 28 April 1904); Minister for Works (from 28 April 1904)	John Nanson, MLA

Preceded by Second Leake Ministry	James Ministry; 1902–1904	Succeeded by Daglish Ministry
