= Forrest ministry =

The Forrest Ministry was the first government ministry in Western Australia, after the inauguration of responsible government. It was in government from 29 December 1890 to 14 February 1901, when it was succeeded by the Throssell Ministry following the 1901 elections.

The members of the Forrest Ministry were:

Office	Minister	Start of term	End of term
Premier^{[1]} Colonial Treasurer	Sir John Forrest	29 December 1890	14 February 1901
Colonial Secretary; Minister for Education^{[2]}	George Shenton	29 December 1890	11 October 1892
Colonial Secretary; Minister for Education^{[2]}	Stephen Henry Parker	11 October 1892	4 December 1894
Colonial Secretary; Minister for Education^{[2]}	Sir John Forrest	4 December 1894	28 April 1898
Colonial Secretary; Minister for Education^{[2]}	George Randell	28 April 1898	15 February 1901^{[3]}
Attorney-General	Septimus Burt	29 December 1890	27 October 1897
Attorney-General	Richard Pennefather	27 October 1897	15 February 1901
Commissioner of Crown Lands	William Marmion	29 December 1890	4 December 1894
Commissioner of Crown Lands	Alexander Richardson	4 December 1894	13 March 1897
Commissioner of Crown Lands	George Throssell	13 March 1897	15 February 1901
Commissioner of Railways; Minister for Works	Harry Venn	29 December 1890	10 March 1896
Commissioner of Railways; Minister for Works	Frederick Piesse	1 April 1896	23 August 1900
Commissioner of Railways; Minister for Works	Barrington Wood	10 September 1900	15 February 1901^{[3]}
Minister for Education^{[2]}	Edward Wittenoom	19 December 1894	12 May 1897
Minister for Education^{[2]}	Henry Lefroy	12 May 1897	28 April 1898
Minister for Mines	Edward Wittenoom	19 December 1894	28 April 1898
Minister for Mines	Henry Lefroy	28 April 1898	15 February 1901^{[3]}
Minister without portfolio	Septimus Burt	29 December 1898	15 February 1901

== Notes ==
^{1} According to Reid & Oliver (1982, p.1), the office of Premier was not provided for in the Constitution Act 1889, which only mention the "principal executive offices of the Government liable to be vacated on political grounds". However, the Governor of Western Australia, Sir William Robinson GCMG, used the courtesy title of Premier to refer to the leader of the Government in public statements, as did the media, and its use was in keeping with that prevalent in other British crown colonies.
^{2} The responsibility for Education lay with the Colonial Secretary in the Forrest Ministry except during the period 19 December 1894 – 28 April 1898. A separate Minister for Education was not re-installed until the Daglish Ministry took office in 1904.
^{3} Three of the ministers were subsequently sworn in for the same substantive role under the Throssell Ministry.

Preceded by N/A	Forrest Ministry; 1890–1901	Succeeded by Throssell Ministry
