= Members of the Western Australian Legislative Assembly, 1904–1905 =

This is a list of members of the Western Australian Legislative Assembly between the 1904 elections and the 1905 elections, together known as the Fifth Parliament.

Name	Party	District	Years in office
William Angwin	Labor	East Fremantle	1904–1905; 1906–1927
Thomas Bath^{[3]}	Labor	Brown Hill	1902–1914
Harry Bolton	Labor	North Fremantle	1904–1917
Harry Brown	Ministerial	Perth	1904–1911
R. G. Burges	Ministerial	York	1903–1905
William Butcher	Independent^{[5]}	Gascoyne	1901–1911; 1915–1917
Henry Carson	Ministerial	Geraldton	1904–1906; 1908–1911
Francis Connor	Independent	Kimberley	1893–1905
Frank Cowcher	Ministerial	Williams	1904–1911
Henry Daglish^{[1]}	Labor/Independent	Subiaco	1901–1911
Arthur Diamond	Ministerial	South Fremantle	1901–1906
Henry Augustus Ellis	Labor/Ind.Lab.	Coolgardie	1904–1905
John Foulkes	Ministerial	Claremont	1902–1911
Frederick Gill	Labor	Balcatta	1904–1905; 1908–1914
William Gordon	Ministerial	Canning	1901–1911
Henry Gregory^{[4]}	Ministerial	Menzies	1897–1911
John Hardwick^{[2]}	Ministerial	East Perth	1904–1911; 1914–1921
Charles Harper	Independent	Beverley	1890–1905
Robert Hastie^{[1]}	Labor	Kanowna	1901–1905
Thomas Hayward	Ministerial	Wellington	1901–1911
Edward Heitmann	Labor	Cue	1904–1913; 1914–1917
Ernest Henshaw	Labor	Collie	1904–1905
John Sydney Hicks^{[4]}	Ministerial	Roebourne	1901–1908
John Holman^{[1]}	Labor	Murchison	1901–1921; 1923–1925
John Marquis Hopkins	Ministerial	Boulder	1901–1905; 1908–1910
Austin Horan	Labor	Yilgarn	1904–1911
James Isdell	Independent^{[5]}	Pilbara	1903–1906
Mathieson Jacoby	Independent^{[5]}	Swan	1901–1905; 1908–1911
Walter James^{[2]}	Ministerial	East Perth	1894–1904
William Johnson^{[1]}	Labor	Kalgoorlie	1901–1905; 1906–1917; 1924–1948
Charles Keyser	Labor	Albany	1904–1905
Charles Layman	Independent^{[5]}	Nelson	1904–1914
Patrick Lynch^{[3]}	Labor	Mount Leonora	1904–1906
John McLarty	Ministerial	Murray	1904–1909
Newton Moore^{[4]}	Ministerial	Bunbury	1904–1911
Samuel Moore	Ministerial	Irwin	1904–1914
Charles Moran	Independent	West Perth	1894–1901; 1902–1905
John Nanson	Ministerial	Greenough	1901–1905; 1908–1914
Ted Needham	Labor	Fremantle	1904–1905; 1933–1953
Wallace Nelson	Labor	Hannans	1904–1905
Frederick Henry Piesse	Independent^{[5]}	Katanning	1890–1909
Timothy Quinlan	Ministerial	Toodyay	1890–1894; 1897–1911
Cornthwaite Rason^{[4]}	Ministerial	Guildford	1897–1906
John Scaddan	Labor	Ivanhoe	1904–1917; 1919–1924; 1930–1933
George Taylor^{[1]}	Labor	Mount Margaret	1901–1930
Albert Thomas	Independent	Dundas	1901–1905
Michael Troy	Labor	Mount Magnet	1904–1939
Alfred Watts	Labor	Northam	1904–1905
Albert Wilson	Labor	Forrest	1904–1908
Francis Wilson	Labor	North Perth	1904–1905
Frank Wilson^{[4]}	Independent^{[5]}	Sussex	1897–1901; 1904–1917

== Notes ==
^{1} Following the 1904 state election a new Ministry consisting of six members, including one Member of the Legislative Council, was appointed. These members were therefore required to resign and contest ministerial by-elections on 19 August 1904, at which all were returned unopposed.
^{2} Sir Walter James, the Ministerialist member for East Perth and former premier, resigned on 4 October 1904 to take up the position of Agent-General for Western Australia in London. At the resulting by-election on 20 October 1904, Ministerial candidate John Hardwick won the seat.
^{3} Following a cabinet reshuffle on 7 June 1905, the member for Brown Hill, Thomas Bath, was appointed minister for education and Lands, and the Member for Mount Leonora, Patrick Lynch, was appointed minister for works. Both were therefore required to resign and contest ministerial by-elections. Bath was returned unopposed on 22 June 1905. Lynch won the by-election in his seat against a second candidate on 30 June 1905.
^{4} Following the failure of the Daglish Ministry in a want of confidence motion on 25 August 1905, a new five-member Ministry comprising Ministerialist members led by Cornthwaite Rason was formed. These members were therefore required to resign and contest ministerial by-elections. John Sydney Hicks, the member for Roebourne, was returned unopposed, while the other four ministers, who were contested, won the by-elections on 14 September 1905. A new election, held on 27 October, was then called to secure parliamentary support for the Ministry.
^{5} Prior to the 1904 election, Labor had been a minor party and government had resided with the supporters of premiers and opposition leaders of various political dispositions, who usually held a formal minority of seats in the Legislative Assembly and relied on the support of Independents or the Labor Party. After Labor won minority government at the 1904 election, most of the other factions united into a single grouping, and several of the Independents elected in 1904 became associated with it, and ran as Ministerial candidates in the 1905 election.

== Sources ==
- Black, David; Prescott, Valerie (1997). Election statistics, Legislative Assembly of Western Australia, 1890-1996. Perth: Parliamentary History Project. ISBN 0-7309-8409-5.
- Hughes, Colin A.; Graham, B. D. (1976). Voting for the South Australian, Western Australian and Tasmanian Lower Houses, 1890-1964. Canberra: Australian National University. ISBN 0-7081-1334-6.
- Western Australian Government Gazettes for 1904 and 1905; Indexed under "Electoral".
