= Lefroy ministry =

The Lefroy Ministry was the 13th Ministry of the Government of Western Australia and was led by Nationalist Premier Sir Henry Lefroy. It succeeded the Second Wilson Ministry on 28 June 1917 due to most members of the former Liberal Party, of which the previous Premier, Frank Wilson, had been the leader, pledging allegiance to the new party. The Lefroy Ministry, which was the first Coalition ministry in Western Australia, was also the only Ministry of a non-Labor government to be chosen by caucus.

The ministry fell due to internal pressures within the party room, stemming in part from Hal Colebatch's handling as Acting Premier of quarantine regulations arising from the influenza epidemic, with Lefroy and two ministers at one point being stranded in Melbourne for several weeks. A party meeting on their return resulted in Lefroy resigning the leadership and Colebatch being elected leader. He formed the short-lived Colebatch Ministry on 17 April 1919.

The following ministers served for the duration of the Ministry:

Office	Minister
Premier; Minister for Lands; Minister for Agriculture; Colonial Treasurer (from 2 April 1919)	Sir Henry Lefroy, MLA
Colonial Treasurer	James Gardiner, MLA (until 2 April 1919)
Colonial Secretary; Minister for Education	Hal Colebatch, MLC
Minister for Works; Minister for Water Supply	William George, MLA
Attorney-General; Minister for Woods and Forests; Minister for Industries	Robert Robinson, MLA
Minister for Mines; Minister for Railways	John Scaddan, MLA (until 27 July 1917)^{[1]} Charles Hudson, MLA (from 27 July 1917)
Minister without portfolio	Francis Willmott, MLA
Minister without portfolio	Charles Baxter, MLC
Minister without portfolio	William Thomas, MLA (until 26 Sep 1917)^{[2]} Henry Underwood, MLA (23 Nov 1917 – 26 Mar 1919)

Legend:

Nationalist Party
Country Party
National Labor Party

^{1} When National Labor Party member John Scaddan was appointed a Minister, he was required to resign and contest his seat of Brownhill-Ivanhoe in a ministerial by-election. Scaddan lost the by-election held on 21 July 1917 to Labor candidate John Lutey. This was only the second occasion in Western Australia's parliamentary history—the first having been the defeat of half of the Morgans Ministry in December 1901—that a Minister had failed to retain his seat at a ministerial by-election resulting from his appointment. Fellow National Labor member Charles Hudson was appointed in his place.
^{2} William Thomas failed to win his seat at the 1917 state election and hence was removed from the ministry on 26 September 1917.

Preceded by Second Wilson Ministry	Lefroy Ministry; 1917–1919	Succeeded by Colebatch Ministry
