= Scaddan ministry =

The Scaddan Ministry was the 11th Ministry of the Government of Western Australia and was led by Labor Premier John Scaddan. It succeeded the First Wilson Ministry led by Ministerialist Frank Wilson on 7 October 1911 after the decisive result of the state election held four days earlier, which had produced the State's first majority Labor government.

The 1914 election produced a one-seat majority for the Labor government, but the disappearance of Joseph Gardiner and his replacement by a Liberal candidate in a by-election, as well as a Labor member becoming an Independent and refusing to support the Government, enabled Wilson to call for a vote of no confidence in the government. On 27 July 1916, the Scaddan Ministry resigned and the Second Wilson Ministry was sworn in.

== First Ministry ==
On 7 October 1911, the Governor, Rt Hon Baron Gerald Strickland, designated 6 principal executive offices of the Government under section 43(2) of the Constitution Acts Amendment Act 1899. The following ministers were then appointed to the positions, and served until the Ministry was reconstituted on 23 November 1914 following the 1914 election.

Office	Minister
Premier; Colonial Treasurer	John Scaddan, MLA
Minister for Railways; Minister for Mines	Philip Collier, MLA
Minister for Lands; Minister for Agriculture	Thomas Bath, MLA
Minister for Works	William Johnson, MLA
Attorney-General; Minister for Education	Thomas Walker, MLA
Colonial Secretary	John Drew, MLC
Minister without portfolio	Jabez Dodd, MLC; William Angwin, MLA

== Second Ministry ==
On 23 November 1914, the Governor, Major-General Sir Harry Barron, designated 6 principal executive offices of the Government under section 43(2) of the Constitution Acts Amendment Act 1899. The following ministers were then appointed to the positions, and served until the end of the Ministry on 27 July 1916.

Office	Minister
Premier; Colonial Treasurer; Minister for Railways	John Scaddan, MLA
Minister for Lands; Minister for Agriculture	William Johnson, MLA
Minister for Mines; Minister for Water Supply	Philip Collier, MLA
Minister for Works	William Angwin, MLA
Attorney-General; Minister for Education	Thomas Walker, MLA
Colonial Secretary	John Drew, MLC
Minister without portfolio	Jabez Dodd, MLC; Henry Underwood, MLA

Preceded by First Wilson Ministry	Scaddan Ministry; 1911–1916	Succeeded by Second Wilson Ministry
