= Results of the 1905 Western Australian state election =

This is a list of the results of the 1905 state election in Western Australia, listed by electoral district.

== Results by electoral district ==
=== Albany ===
1905 Western Australian state election: Albany
Party	Candidate	Votes	%	±%
Ministerialist	Edward Barnett	674	55.1	+55.1
Ministerialist	Charles Keyser	550	44.9	–6.5
Total formal votes		1,224	99.1	+2.2
Informal votes		11	0.9	–2.2
Turnout		1,241	45.8	+1.7
Ministerialist hold		Swing	N/A	

=== Balcatta ===
1905 Western Australian state election: Balcatta
Party	Candidate	Votes	%	±%
Ministerialist	John Veryard	768	55.4	+38.9
Labour	Frederick Gill	619	44.6	–11.9
Total formal votes		1,387	99.4	+0.9
Informal votes		8	0.6	–0.9
Turnout		1,395	57.7	+7.5
Ministerialist gain from Labour		Swing	+38.9	

=== Beverley ===
1905 Western Australian state election: Beverley
Party	Candidate	Votes	%	±%
Ministerialist	Edmund Smith	325	44.3	+44.3
Ministerialist	George Ricks	183	25.0	+25.0
Ministerialist	Francis McDonald	179	24.4	+24.4
Ministerialist	Hugh Edmiston	46	6.3	–40.3
Total formal votes		733	99.3	–0.1
Informal votes		5	0.7	+0.1
Turnout		738	51.5	+4.4
Ministerialist gain from Independent		Swing	N/A	

=== Boulder ===
1905 Western Australian state election: Boulder
Party	Candidate	Votes	%	±%
Labour	Philip Collier	872	46.8	+8.3
Ministerialist	John Hopkins	853	45.7	–15.8
Independent	William Rabbish	140	7.5	+7.5
Total formal votes		1,865	99.6	–0.1
Informal votes		8	0.4	+0.1
Turnout		1,880	69.1	+9.0
Labour gain from Ministerialist		Swing	+8.3	

=== Brown Hill ===
1905 Western Australian state election: Brown Hill
Party	Candidate	Votes	%	±%
Labour	Thomas Bath	1,093	69.3	–30.7
Independent	Richard White	484	30.7	+30.7
Total formal votes		1,577	99.6	n/a
Informal votes		7	0.4	n/a
Turnout		1,584	57.9	n/a
Labour hold		Swing	–30.7	

=== Bunbury ===
1905 Western Australian state election: Bunbury
Party	Candidate	Votes	%	±%
Ministerialist	Newton Moore	unopposed		
Ministerialist hold		Swing		

=== Canning ===
1905 Western Australian state election: Canning
Party	Candidate	Votes	%	±%
Ministerialist	William Gordon	643	50.6	+5.3
Independent	James Milligan	496	39.1	+14.5
Ministerialist	Joseph Charles	131	10.3	+10.3
Total formal votes		1,270	99.9	+1.0
Informal votes		1	0.1	–1.0
Turnout		1,271	45.0	–9.0
Ministerialist hold		Swing	N/A	

=== Claremont ===
1905 Western Australian state election: Claremont
Party	Candidate	Votes	%	±%
Ministerialist	John Foulkes	1,064	71.3	–11.1
Ministerialist	James Weir	428	28.7	+28.7
Total formal votes		1,492	99.3	+2.0
Informal votes		10	0.7	–2.0
Turnout		1,502	45.6	–13.9
Ministerialist hold		Swing	N/A	

=== Collie ===
1905 Western Australian state election: Collie
Party	Candidate	Votes	%	±%
Ministerialist	John Ewing	600	54.0	+13.5
Labour	Ernest Henshaw	511	46.0	–13.5
Total formal votes		1,111	99.9	+1.3
Informal votes		1	0.1	–1.3
Turnout		1,112	49.8	+0.8
Ministerialist gain from Labour		Swing	+13.5	

=== Coolgardie ===
1905 Western Australian state election: Coolgardie
Party	Candidate	Votes	%	±%
Ministerialist	William Eddy	544	36.0	–5.5
Labour	Charles McDowall	521	34.5	–24.0
Independent Labour	Henry Ellis	446	29.5	+29.5
Total formal votes		1,511	96.3	–2.9
Informal votes		58	0.8	+2.9
Turnout		1,569	56.3	–3.4
Ministerialist gain from Independent Labour		Swing	–5.5	

=== Cue ===
1905 Western Australian state election: Cue
Party	Candidate	Votes	%	±%
Labour	Edward Heitmann	624	51.4	–5.0
Ministerialist	James Chesson	590	48.6	+5.0
Total formal votes		1,214	98.9	–0.5
Informal votes		13	1.1	+0.5
Turnout		1,218	51.6	–6.9
Labour hold		Swing	–5.0	

=== Dundas ===
1905 Western Australian state election: Dundas
Party	Candidate	Votes	%	±%
Labour	Charles Hudson	382	38.3	–7.7
Independent	Albert Thomas	370	37.1	–16.9
Independent Labour	Robert Stewart	245	24.6	+24.6
Total formal votes		997	98.7	–0.5
Informal votes		13	1.3	+0.5
Turnout		1,010	61.5	–3.3
Labour gain from Independent		Swing	–5.5	

=== East Fremantle ===
1905 Western Australian state election: East Fremantle
Party	Candidate	Votes	%	±%
Ministerialist	Joseph Holmes	1,019	50.5	+3.5
Labour	William Angwin	999	49.5	–3.5
Total formal votes		2,018	99.7	+0.1
Informal votes		5	0.3	–0.1
Turnout		2,023	65.2	+9.5
Ministerialist gain from Labour		Swing	–3.5	

=== East Perth ===
1905 Western Australian state election: East Perth
Party	Candidate	Votes	%	±%
Ministerialist	John Hardwick	1,090	50.7	–4.6
Labour	Joseph Fabre	621	28.9	–15.8
Ministerialist	Frank Smalpage	437	20.3	+20.3
Total formal votes		2,148	99.0	±0.0
Informal votes		22	1.0	±0.0
Turnout		2,170	48.6	+15.8
Ministerialist hold		Swing	N/A	

=== Forrest ===
1905 Western Australian state election: Forrest
Party	Candidate	Votes	%	±%
Labour	Albert Wilson	unopposed		
Labour hold		Swing		

=== Fremantle ===
1905 Western Australian state election: Fremantle
Party	Candidate	Votes	%	±%
Ministerialist	James Price	744	52.5	+3.3
Labour	Ted Needham	674	47.5	–3.3
Total formal votes		1,418	98.1	–0.7
Informal votes		28	1.9	+0.7
Turnout		1,446	61.9	+28.7
Ministerialist gain from Labour		Swing	+3.3	

=== Gascoyne ===
1905 Western Australian state election: Gascoyne
Party	Candidate	Votes	%	±%
Ministerialist	William Butcher	unopposed		
Ministerialist hold		Swing		

=== Geraldton ===
1905 Western Australian state election: Geraldton
Party	Candidate	Votes	%	±%
Ministerialist	Henry Carson	577	51.2	+6.2
Labour	Thomas Brown	551	48.8	+5.8
Total formal votes		1,128	99.0	+0.3
Informal votes		11	1.0	–0.3
Turnout		1,139	71.8	+3.3
Ministerialist hold		Swing	N/A	

=== Greenough ===
1905 Western Australian state election: Greenough
Party	Candidate	Votes	%	±%
Ind. Ministerialist	Patrick Stone	314	45.0	+14.4
Ministerialist	Edward Harney	235	33.7	+33.7
Ministerialist	Henry Maley	149	21.4	+21.4
Total formal votes		698	98.6	+0.4
Informal votes		10	1.4	–0.4
Turnout		708	55.5	–6.7
Ind. Ministerialist gain from Ministerialist		Swing	+14.4	

=== Guildford ===
1905 Western Australian state election: Guildford
Party	Candidate	Votes	%	±%
Ministerialist	Hector Rason	unopposed		
Ministerialist hold		Swing		

=== Hannans ===
1905 Western Australian state election: Hannans
Party	Candidate	Votes	%	±%
Labour	Francis Ware	1,519	74.2	+8.8
Ministerialist	Robert Boylen	529	25.8	+25.8
Total formal votes		2,041	98.6	–1.2
Informal votes		29	1.4	+1.2
Turnout		2,070	55.5	+9.2
Labour hold		Swing	+8.8	

=== Irwin ===
1905 Western Australian state election: Irwin
Party	Candidate	Votes	%	±%
Ministerialist	Samuel Moore	unopposed		
Ministerialist hold		Swing		

=== Ivanhoe ===
1905 Western Australian state election: Ivanhoe
Party	Candidate	Votes	%	±%
Labour	John Scaddan	unopposed		
Labour hold		Swing		

=== Kalgoorlie ===
1905 Western Australian state election: Kalgoorlie
Party	Candidate	Votes	%	±%
Ind. Ministerialist	Norbert Keenan	1,629	60.9	+13.0
Labour	William Johnson	1,045	39.1	–13.0
Total formal votes		2,674	99.2	–0.4
Informal votes		21	0.8	+0.4
Turnout		2,695	72.9	+14.0
Ind. Ministerialist gain from Labour		Swing	+13.0	

=== Kanowna ===
1905 Western Australian state election: Kanowna
Party	Candidate	Votes	%	±%
Labour	Thomas Walker	965	68.9	–31.1
Ministerialist	Henry Field	435	31.1	+31.1
Total formal votes		1,400	99.1	n/a
Informal votes		13	0.9	n/a
Turnout		1,413	47.9	n/a
Labour hold		Swing	–31.1	

=== Katanning ===
1905 Western Australian state election: Katanning
Party	Candidate	Votes	%	±%
Ministerialist	Frederick Henry Piesse	unopposed		
Ministerialist hold		Swing	n/a	

=== Kimberley ===
1905 Western Australian state election: Kimberley
Party	Candidate	Votes	%	±%
Ministerialist	Arthur Male	263	55.5	+55.5
Independent	Francis Connor	211	44.5	–6.6
Total formal votes		474	99.2	–0.3
Informal votes		4	0.8	+0.3
Turnout		478	42.5	–6.9
Ministerialist gain from Independent		Swing	+55.5	

=== Menzies ===
1905 Western Australian state election: Menzies
Party	Candidate	Votes	%	±%
Ministerialist	Henry Gregory	874	52.5	–6.6
Labour	Richard Buzacott	790	47.5	+6.6
Total formal votes		1,664	99.3	n/a
Informal votes		11	0.7	n/a
Turnout		1,675	67.1	n/a
Ministerialist hold		Swing	–6.6	

=== Mount Leonora ===
1905 Western Australian state election: Mount Leonora
Party	Candidate	Votes	%	±%
Labour	Patrick Lynch	786	67.5	+0.9
Ministerialist	Joseph Semken	378	32.5	–0.9
Total formal votes		1,204	98.5	n/a
Informal votes		18	1.5	n/a
Turnout		1,222	67.1	n/a
Labour hold		Swing	+0.9	

=== Mount Magnet ===
1905 Western Australian state election: Mount Magnet
Party	Candidate	Votes	%	±%
Labour	Frank Troy	557	66.2	+4.9
Ministerialist	George Baxter	285	33.8	–4.9
Total formal votes		842	98.6	–2.8
Informal votes		12	1.4	+2.8
Turnout		854	45.4	–3.2
Labour hold		Swing	+4.9	

=== Mount Margaret ===
1905 Western Australian state election: Mount Margaret
Party	Candidate	Votes	%	±%
Labour	George Taylor	738	53.9	–46.1
Ministerialist	John Smith	323	23.6	+23.6
Labour	Thomas Campbell	309	22.5	+22.5
Total formal votes		1,370	99.0	n/a
Informal votes		14	1.0	n/a
Turnout		1,384	29.7	n/a
Labour hold		Swing	–46.1	

=== Murchison ===
1905 Western Australian state election: Murchison
Party	Candidate	Votes	%	±%
Labour	John Holman	unopposed		
Labour hold		Swing	N/A	

=== Murray ===
1905 Western Australian state election: Murray
Party	Candidate	Votes	%	±%
Ministerialist	John McLarty	452	72.8	+9.6
Ministerialist	George Wheatley	169	27.2	+27.2
Total formal votes		621	98.4	+0.1
Informal votes		10	1.6	–0.1
Turnout		628	44.1	–8.9
Ministerialist hold		Swing	N/A	

=== Nelson ===
1905 Western Australian state election: Nelson
Party	Candidate	Votes	%	±%
Ministerialist	Charles Layman	556	57.3	+10.7
Ministerialist	John Walter	414	42.7	+42.7
Total formal votes		970	99.5	+0.4
Informal votes		5	0.5	–0.4
Turnout		986	72.2	+6.7
Ministerialist hold		Swing	N/A	

=== Northam ===
1905 Western Australian state election: Northam
Party	Candidate	Votes	%	±%
Ministerialist	James Mitchell	984	55.2	+11.9
Labour	Alfred Watts	800	44.8	–11.9
Total formal votes		1,784	99.5	+0.4
Informal votes		8	0.5	–0.4
Turnout		1,790	53.1	+6.3
Ministerialist gain from Labour		Swing	+11.9	

=== North Fremantle ===
1905 Western Australian state election: North Fremantle
Party	Candidate	Votes	%	±%
Labour	Harry Bolton	894	62.5	+3.6
Ministerialist	Patrick Hevron	537	37.5	–3.6
Total formal votes		1,431	99.6	+0.4
Informal votes		6	0.4	–0.4
Turnout		1,437	66.7	+11.5
Labour hold		Swing	+3.6	

=== North Perth ===
1905 Western Australian state election: North Perth
Party	Candidate	Votes	%	±%
Ministerialist	James Brebber	1,478	61.9	+40.6
Labour	Francis Wilson	911	38.1	–8.1
Total formal votes		2,389	99.0	–0.2
Informal votes		25	1.0	+0.2
Turnout		2,416	48.2	+7.6
Ministerialist gain from Labour		Swing	+40.6	

=== Perth ===
1905 Western Australian state election: Perth
Party	Candidate	Votes	%	±%
Ministerialist	Harry Brown	567	53.0	–10.0
Independent	Charles Moran	336	31.4	+31.4
Ministerialist	Henry Braidwood	167	15.6	+15.6
Total formal votes		1,070	98.2	–0.9
Informal votes		20	1.8	+0.9
Turnout		1,090	62.4	+34.4
Ministerialist hold		Swing	N/A	

=== Pilbara ===
1905 Western Australian state election: Pilbara
Party	Candidate	Votes	%	±%
Ministerialist	James Isdell	unopposed		
Ministerialist hold		Swing		

=== Roebourne ===
1905 Western Australian state election: Roebourne
Party	Candidate	Votes	%	±%
Ministerialist	John Sydney Hicks	unopposed		
Ministerialist hold		Swing		

=== South Fremantle ===
1905 Western Australian state election: South Fremantle
Party	Candidate	Votes	%	±%
Ministerialist	Arthur Diamond	1,116	56.0	–2.5
Labour	Alick McCallum	878	44.0	+2.5
Total formal votes		1,994	98.8	–0.6
Informal votes		24	1.2	+0.6
Turnout		2,018	51.4	+12.2
Ministerialist hold		Swing	–2.5	

=== Subiaco ===
1905 Western Australian state election: Subiaco
Party	Candidate	Votes	%	±%
Independent Labour	Henry Daglish	1,086	51.9	–28.1
Ministerialist	Samuel Brown	1,006	48.1	+48.1
Total formal votes		2,092	99.2	–0.2
Informal votes		17	0.8	+0.2
Turnout		2,109	61.7	–10.2
Independent Labour hold		Swing	N/A	

=== Sussex ===
1905 Western Australian state election: Sussex
Party	Candidate	Votes	%	±%
Ministerialist	Frank Wilson	520	76.5	+8.3
Ministerialist	James Shekleton	160	23.5	+23.5
Total formal votes		680	97.0	n/a
Informal votes		21	3.0	n/a
Turnout		701	72.5	n/a
Ministerialist hold		Swing	N/A	

=== Swan ===
1905 Western Australian state election: Swan
Party	Candidate	Votes	%	±%
Ministerialist	Arthur Gull	469	51.9	+51.9
Ministerialist	Mathieson Jacoby	434	48.1	+48.1
Total formal votes		903	99.8	+0.8
Informal votes		2	0.2	–0.8
Turnout		906	34.4	–10.3
Ministerialist hold		Swing	N/A	

=== Toodyay ===
1905 Western Australian state election: Toodyay
Party	Candidate	Votes	%	±%
Ministerialist	Timothy Quinlan	unopposed		
Ministerialist hold		Swing		

=== Wellington ===
1905 Western Australian state election: Wellington
Party	Candidate	Votes	%	±%
Ministerialist	Thomas Hayward	458	77.2	+25.7
Labour	Thomas Adams	167	22.8	+1.4
Total formal votes		732	99.5	+0.6
Informal votes		4	0.5	–0.6
Turnout		736	42.6	–5.9
Ministerialist hold		Swing	+25.7	

=== West Perth ===
1905 Western Australian state election: West Perth
Party	Candidate	Votes	%	±%
Ministerialist	Frederick Illingworth	1,276	65.4	+65.4
Ministerialist	James Speed	655	33.6	+33.6
Labour	Robert Norman	21	1.1	–23.1
Total formal votes		1,952	98.4	±0
Informal votes		32	1.6	±0
Turnout		1,984	49.2	+9.7
Ministerialist hold		Swing	N/A	

=== Williams ===
1905 Western Australian state election: Williams
Party	Candidate	Votes	%	±%
Ministerialist	Frank Cowcher	703	81.2	+36.2
Labour	Peter Wedd	163	18.8	–5.4
Total formal votes		866	98.6	+0.1
Informal votes		12	1.4	–0.1
Turnout		878	42.6	–12.0
Ministerialist hold		Swing	+36.2	

=== Yilgarn ===
1905 Western Australian state election: Yilgarn
Party	Candidate	Votes	%	±%
Labour	Austin Horan	517	58.7	–2.9
Independent Labour	Fergie Reid	364	41.3	+41.3
Total formal votes		881	99.5	+0.6
Informal votes		13	0.5	–0.6
Turnout		894	43.4	+13.4
Labour hold		Swing	–2.9	

=== York ===
1905 Western Australian state election: York
Party	Candidate	Votes	%	±%
Ministerialist	Frederick Monger	315	57.4	–42.6
Ministerialist	Hugh Roche	234	42.6	+42.6
Total formal votes		549	99.6	n/a
Informal votes		2	0.4	n/a
Turnout		551	50.4	n/a
Ministerialist hold		Swing	N/A	

== See also ==
- Members of the Western Australian Legislative Assembly, 1904–1905
- Members of the Western Australian Legislative Assembly, 1905–1908
