= First Mitchell ministry =

The First Mitchell Ministry was the 15th Ministry of the Government of Western Australia and was led by Nationalist Premier James Mitchell. It succeeded the Colebatch Ministry on 17 May 1919 after the collapse of Hal Colebatch's brief service as Premier. It assumed a stability which had been absent from Western Australian politics since the 1914 election. The ministry was followed by the Collier Ministry on 15 April 1924 after the Nationalist coalition lost government at the state election held on 22 March.

== First Ministry ==
The following ministers served until the reconstitution of the Ministry on 12 April 1921, following the 1921 state election:

Office	Minister
Premier; Colonial Treasurer; Minister for Lands; Minister for Repatriation	Sir James Mitchell, MLA
Minister for Agriculture; Minister for Public Health; Minister for Education; Minister for the North-West	Hal Colebatch, MLC
Attorney-General	Thomas Draper, MLA
Minister for Works; Minister for Water Supply	William George, MLA
Colonial Secretary (until 25 June 1919); Minister for Railways (from 25 June 1919:) Minister for Mines Minister for Forests Minister for Police Minister for Industries	John Scaddan, MLA
Colonial Secretary (from 25 June 1919)	Frank Broun, MLA
Minister for Mines; Minister for Industries; Minister for Forests	Robert Robinson, MLA (until 21 June 1919)
Minister without portfolio	Francis Willmott, MLA
Minister without portfolio	Charles Baxter, MLC

Legend:

Nationalist Party
Country Party

== Second Ministry ==
The following ministers served from their appointment on 12 April 1921 until the end of the Ministry on 15 April 1924, following the 1924 state election:

Office	Minister
Premier; Colonial Treasurer; Minister for Lands; Minister for Repatriation	Sir James Mitchell, MLA
Minister for Education; Minister for the North-West; Minister for Justice	Hal Colebatch, MLC (until 17 June 1923)
Minister for Education; Minister for the North-West; Minister for Justice	John Ewing, MLC (from 18 June 1923)
Minister for Works; Minister for Water Supply	William George, MLA
Minister for Railways; Minister for Mines; Minister for Forests; Minister for Police; Minister for Industries	John Scaddan, MLA
Colonial Secretary; Minister for Public Health	Frank Broun, MLA (until 22 August 1922)
Colonial Secretary; Minister for Public Health	Richard Sampson, MLA (from 22 August 1922)
Minister for Agriculture	Henry Kennedy Maley, MLA

Preceded by Colebatch Ministry	First Mitchell Ministry; 1919–1924	Succeeded by First Collier Ministry
