= Throssell ministry =

The Throssell Ministry was the second Ministry of the Government of Western Australia. It succeeded the Forrest Ministry on 15 February 1901 after Sir John Forrest's move from state to federal politics, and was led by Forrest's choice of successor, George Throssell. However, no clear winner emerged from the April 1901 state election, and rather than test his support in the Assembly, Throssell and the Ministry he led resigned on 27 May 1901, allowing the Leake Ministry led by Opposition Leader George Leake to take office.

The members of the Throssell ministry were:

Office	Minister
Premier; Colonial Treasurer	George Throssell
Colonial Secretary; Minister for Education	George Randell^{[1]}
Attorney-General	Richard Pennefather (until 20 March 1901)^{[2]}
Attorney-General	William Sayer (from 25 March 1901)
Commissioner of Crown Lands	Charles Moran
Commissioner of Railways; Minister for Works	Barrington Wood^{[3]}
Minister for Mines	Henry Lefroy^{[1]}

== Notes ==
^{1} George Randell and Henry Lefroy had served in these portfolios since 28 April 1898 as part of the Forrest Ministry.
^{2} Richard Pennefather had served as Attorney-General since 27 October 1897 as part of the Forrest Ministry. He did not contest his seat of Greenough at the 1901 election.
^{3} Barrington Wood had served in these portfolios since 10 September 1900 as part of the Forrest Ministry.

Preceded by Forrest Ministry	Throssell Ministry; 1901	Succeeded by First Leake Ministry
