= Wilson ministry =

Wilson ministry may refer to:

- Frank Wilson's terms as Premier of Western Australia:
  - First Wilson ministry (Western Australia), the state government led by Frank Wilson from 1910 to 1911
  - Second Wilson ministry (Western Australia), the state government led by Frank Wilson from 1916 to 1917
- Harold Wilson's terms as Prime Minister of the United Kingdom:
  - First Wilson ministry, the British majority government led by Harold Wilson from 1964 to 1966
  - Second Wilson ministry, the British majority government led by Harold Wilson from 1966 to 1970
  - Third Wilson ministry, the British minority government led by Harold Wilson from March to October 1974
  - Fourth Wilson ministry, the British majority government led by Harold Wilson from October 1974 to 1976

== See also ==
- Premierships of Harold Wilson
- Shadow Cabinet of Harold Wilson (disambiguation)
