= Electoral results for the district of Kanowna =

Western Australian district election results

This is a list of electoral results for the Electoral district of Kanowna in Western Australian state elections.

== Members for Kanowna ==
Members	Party	Term
Robert Hastie	Labour	1901–1905
Thomas Walker	Labor	1905–1932
Emil Nulsen	Labor	1932–1950

== Election results ==
=== Elections in the 1940s ===
1947 Western Australian state election: Kanowna
Party	Candidate	Votes	%	±%
Labor	Emil Nulsen	unopposed		
Labor hold		Swing		

1943 Western Australian state election: Kanowna
Party	Candidate	Votes	%	±%
Labor	Emil Nulsen	unopposed		
Labor hold		Swing		

=== Elections in the 1930s ===
1939 Western Australian state election: Kanowna
Party	Candidate	Votes	%	±%
Labor	Emil Nulsen	unopposed		
Labor hold		Swing		

1936 Western Australian state election: Kanowna
Party	Candidate	Votes	%	±%
Labor	Emil Nulsen	unopposed		
Labor hold		Swing		

1933 Western Australian state election: Kanowna
Party	Candidate	Votes	%	±%
Labor	Emil Nulsen	unopposed		
Labor hold		Swing		

1932 Kanowna state by-election
Party	Candidate	Votes	%	±%
Labor	Emil Nulsen	823	62.6	−10.3
Nationalist	William Greenard	312	23.7	+23.7
Liberation League	Edward White	179	13.6	+13.6
Total formal votes		1,314	99.1	0.0
Informal votes		12	0.9	0.0
Turnout		1,326	71.6	+12.1
Labor hold		Swing	N/A	

- Preferences were not distributed.

1930 Western Australian state election: Kanowna
Party	Candidate	Votes	%	±%
Labor	Thomas Walker	782	72.9	
Country	Sydney Hayes	291	27.1	
Total formal votes		1,073	99.1	
Informal votes		10	0.9	
Turnout		1,083	59.5	
Labor hold		Swing		

=== Elections in the 1920s ===
1927 Western Australian state election: Kanowna
Party	Candidate	Votes	%	±%
Labor	Thomas Walker	unopposed		
Labor hold		Swing		

1924 Western Australian state election: Kanowna
Party	Candidate	Votes	%	±%
Labor	Thomas Walker	700	72.3	+9.0
Executive Country	Neville Heenan	174	18.0	+18.0
Nationalist	Charles Dempster	94	9.7	−27.0
Total formal votes		700	98.6	−1.1
Informal votes		14	1.4	+1.1
Turnout		982	69.3	+9.3
Labor hold		Swing	N/A	

1921 Western Australian state election: Kanowna
Party	Candidate	Votes	%	±%
Labor	Thomas Walker	470	63.3	+5.2
Nationalist	Frederick Campbell	273	36.7	+30.1
Total formal votes		743	99.7	+2.6
Informal votes		2	0.3	−2.6
Turnout		745	60.0	+6.6
Labor hold		Swing	N/A	

=== Elections in the 1910s ===
1917 Western Australian state election: Kanowna
Party	Candidate	Votes	%	±%
Labor	Thomas Walker	598	58.1	–41.9
National Labor	John Eastmon	363	35.3	+35.3
Nationalist	John Keegan	68	6.6	+6.6
Total formal votes		1,029	97.1	n/a
Informal votes		31	2.9	n/a
Turnout		1,060	53.4	n/a
Labor hold		Swing	–41.9	

1914 Western Australian state election: Kanowna
Party	Candidate	Votes	%	±%
Labor	Thomas Walker	unopposed		
Labor hold		Swing		

1911 Western Australian state election: Kanowna
Party	Candidate	Votes	%	±%
Labor	Thomas Walker	unopposed		
Labor hold		Swing		

=== Elections in the 1900s ===
1908 Western Australian state election: Kanowna
Party	Candidate	Votes	%	±%
Labour	Thomas Walker	945	82.8	+13.9
Ministerialist	Braidwood Evans	196	17.2	−13.9
Total formal votes		1,141	99.4	+0.3
Informal votes		7	0.6	−0.3
Turnout		1,148	56.0	+8.1
Labour hold		Swing	+13.9	

1905 Western Australian state election: Kanowna
Party	Candidate	Votes	%	±%
Labour	Thomas Walker	965	68.9	–31.1
Ministerialist	Henry Field	435	31.1	+31.1
Total formal votes		1,400	99.1	n/a
Informal votes		13	0.9	n/a
Turnout		1,413	47.9	n/a
Labour hold		Swing	–31.1	

1904 Western Australian state election: Kanowna
Party	Candidate	Votes	%	±%
Labour	Robert Hastie	unopposed		
Labour hold		Swing		

1901 Western Australian state election: Kanowna
Party	Candidate	Votes	%	±%
Labour	Robert Hastie	912	60.0	+60.0
Opposition	Charles Mann	155	10.2	+10.2
Opposition	John Auldjo	143	9.4	+9.4
Opposition	Alfred McKenzie	139	9.1	+9.1
Opposition	William McMeikan	118	7.8	+7.8
Opposition	Frederick Hancey	53	3.5	+3.5
Total formal votes		1,520	94.1	n/a
Informal votes		95	5.9	n/a
Turnout		1,615	27.8	n/a
Labour win		(new seat)		
