= Second Wilson ministry (Western Australia) =

The Second Wilson Ministry was the 12th Ministry of the Government of Western Australia and was led by Liberal Premier Frank Wilson. It succeeded the Scaddan Ministry on 27 July 1916 after a vote of no confidence passed in the Legislative Assembly, due mainly to the Labor Party losing its one-seat majority through a by-election and a member resigning from the party to become an independent. In early 1917, the Liberal Party was consumed by the Nationalist Party, to whom most of its members pledged their allegiance. Its leader, Sir Henry Lefroy, formed the Lefroy Ministry on 28 June 1917.

The following ministers served for the duration of the Ministry:

| Office | Minister |
|---|---|
| Premier; Colonial Treasurer | Frank Wilson, MLA |
| Minister for Lands; Minister for Agriculture | Sir Henry Lefroy, MLA |
| Minister for Railways; Minister for Water Supply | James Mitchell, MLA |
| Minister for Education; Colonial Secretary | Hal Colebatch, MLC |
| Minister for Works | William George, MLA |
| Attorney-General; Minister for Mines | Robert Robinson, MLA |
| Minister without portfolio | James Connolly, MLA; Athelstan Saw, MLC |

| Preceded by Scaddan Ministry | Second Wilson Ministry; 1916–1917 | Succeeded by Lefroy Ministry |
