= Rason ministry =

The Rason Ministry was the 8th Ministry of the Government of Western Australia and was led by Ministerialist Premier Hector Rason. It succeeded the Daglish Ministry on 25 August 1905 after the previous Labor minority administration fell on a vote of no confidence. On 7 May 1906, it was followed by the Moore Ministry led by Minister for Lands Newton Moore.

On 25 August 1905, the Governor, Admiral Sir Frederick Bedford, designated 6 principal executive offices of the Government under section 43(2) of the Constitution Acts Amendment Act 1899. The following ministers were then appointed to the positions, and served until the end of the Ministry.

Office	Minister
Premier; Colonial Treasurer; Minister for Justice	Hector Rason, MLA
Colonial Secretary; Minister for Education	Walter Kingsmill, MLC
Minister for Mines; Minister for Railways	Henry Gregory, MLA
Minister for Works	Frank Wilson, MLA
Minister for Lands	Newton Moore, MLA
Minister for Labour	John Sydney Hicks, MLA
Minister without portfolio	Matthew Moss, MLC

Preceded by Daglish Ministry	Rason Ministry; 1905–1906	Succeeded by Moore Ministry
