= Daglish ministry =

Western Australian ministry

The Daglish Ministry was the 7th Ministry of the Government of Western Australia and was led by Labor Premier Henry Daglish. It succeeded the James Ministry on 10 August 1904 after the 1904 election boosted Labor's seat count from 8 to 22 in the 50-seat Legislative Assembly. As such it was a minority government and relied on the support of four independents.

The resulting Ministry was interesting for various reasons. It was the first Labor Ministry in Western Australia and one of the first in Australia. Unlike all previous Ministries, it consisted almost entirely of men who had immigrated to Western Australia in the previous two decades. Some hurdles needed to be overcome. A constitutional requirement that the Ministry include at least one member of the Legislative Council was met when John Drew, an Independent member of that chamber, agreed to serve. Additionally, as Labor contained no lawyers within its ranks, the role of Attorney-General as chief law officer of the State lapsed, and Robert Hastie was named Minister for Justice instead.

Just over a year later, the Government lost support on the floor of the house and fell on a vote of no confidence. On 25 August 1905, it was followed by the Rason Ministry led by Hector Rason, a former Minister in the James Ministry.

== The Ministry ==
On 10 August 1904, the Governor, Admiral Sir Frederick Bedford, designated 6 principal executive offices of the Government under section 43(2) of the Constitution Acts Amendment Act 1899. The following ministers were then appointed to the positions, and served until the reconstitution of the Ministry on 7 June 1905.

| Office | Minister |
|---|---|
| Premier; Colonial Treasurer; Minister for Education | Henry Daglish, MLA |
| Minister for Lands | John Drew, MLC |
| Colonial Secretary | George Taylor, MLA |
| Minister for Justice; Minister for Mines | Robert Hastie, MLA |
| Minister for Labour; Minister for Railways | John Holman, MLA |
| Minister for Works | William Johnson, MLA |
| Minister without portfolio | William Angwin, MLA |

On 7 June 1905, a reshuffle took place with a new Ministry being sworn in. The following ministers served until the end of the Ministry on 25 August 1905.

| Office | Minister |
|---|---|
| Premier; Colonial Treasurer | Henry Daglish, MLA |
| Minister for Education; Minister for Lands | Thomas Bath, MLA |
| Colonial Secretary | John Drew, MLC |
| Minister for Justice; Minister for Labour | Robert Hastie, MLA |
| Minister for Mines; Minister for Railways | William Johnson, MLA |
| Minister for Works | Patrick Lynch, MLA (until 4 August 1905) |
| Minister without portfolio | William Angwin, MLA |

| Preceded by James Ministry | Daglish Ministry; 1904–1905 | Succeeded by Rason Ministry |
