= First Wilson ministry (Western Australia) =

The First Wilson Ministry was the 10th Ministry of the Government of Western Australia and was led by Ministerialist Premier Frank Wilson. It succeeded the Moore Ministry on 16 September 1910 after Sir Newton Moore resigned to accept an appointment as Agent-General for Western Australia in London. The ministry was followed by the Scaddan Ministry on 7 October 1911 after the Ministerialists lost government at the state election held four days earlier.

On 16 September 1910, the Governor, Rt Hon Baron Gerald Strickland, designated 6 principal executive offices of the Government under section 43(2) of the Constitution Acts Amendment Act 1899. The following ministers were then appointed to the positions, and served until the end of the Ministry on 7 October 1911.

Office	Minister
Premier; Colonial Treasurer	Frank Wilson, MLA
Minister for Mines; Minister for Railways	Henry Gregory, MLA
Minister for Lands; Minister for Agriculture; Minister for Industries	James Mitchell, MLA
Colonial Secretary	James Connolly, MLC
Attorney-General; Minister for Education	John Nanson, MLA
Minister for Works	Henry Daglish, MLA
Minister without portfolio	Arthur Male, MLA; Robert McKenzie, MLC

Preceded by Moore Ministry	First Wilson Ministry; 1910–1911	Succeeded by Scaddan Ministry
