= Moore ministry (Western Australia) =

The Moore Ministry was the 9th Ministry of the Government of Western Australia and was led by Ministerialist Premier Newton Moore. It succeeded the Rason Ministry on 7 May 1906 after Rason resigned to accept an appointment as Agent-General for Western Australia in London. It was succeeded by the First Wilson Ministry on 16 September 1910 after Moore resigned for exactly the same reason.

On 7 May 1906, the Governor, Admiral Sir Frederick Bedford, designated 6 principal executive offices of the Government under section 43(2) of the Constitution Acts Amendment Act 1899. The following ministers were then appointed to the positions, and served until the reconstitution of the Ministry on 30 June 1909.

Office	Minister
Premier; Minister for Lands; Minister for Justice (from 14 May 1909)	Newton Moore, MLA
Minister for Agriculture; Colonial Treasurer; Minister for Education	Frank Wilson, MLA
Attorney-General	Norbert Keenan, MLA (until 14 May 1909)
Minister for Works	James Price, MLA
Minister for Mines; Minister for Railways	Henry Gregory, MLA
Colonial Secretary; Minister for Commerce and Labour	James Connolly, MLC
Minister without portfolio	Charles Piesse, MLC (until 14 May 1909)
Minister without portfolio	John Nanson, MLA (from 14 May 1909)
Honorary Minister for Lands and Agriculture	James Mitchell, MLA

On 30 June 1909, the Ministry was reconstituted following the resignation of Norbert Keenan. The Ministers sworn in then served until the end of the Ministry on 16 September 1910.

Office	Minister
Premier; Colonial Treasurer	Newton Moore, MLA
Minister for Lands; Minister for Agriculture	James Mitchell, MLA
Attorney-General; Minister for Education	John Nanson, MLA
Minister for Works	Frank Wilson, MLA
Minister for Mines; Minister for Railways	Henry Gregory, MLA
Colonial Secretary; Minister for Commerce and Labour	James Connolly, MLC
Minister without portfolio	James Price, MLA (until 21 May 1910)

Preceded by Rason Ministry	Moore Ministry; 1906–1910	Succeeded by First Wilson Ministry
