= Moore Ministry =

Moore Ministry may refer to:

- Moore Ministry (Queensland) 1929-1932
- Moore Ministry (Western Australia) 1906-1910
