= List of Western Australian ministries =

The ministries of Western Australia (also known as Cabinets) are the centre of executive power in the Government of Western Australia. They are composed of Ministers who are responsible for one or more portfolios, answer questions on those portfolios in Parliament, and control the operation and administration of departments, authorities, statutes and votes within those portfolios. In a formal constitutional sense, they possess executive power through being appointed to the Executive Council, which contains all members of the Ministry plus a Clerk (who is a staff member and not a member of Parliament), and is headed by the Governor of Western Australia who represents the Crown.

The members of the Ministry are selected by the Premier of Western Australia and then appointed by the Governor from members of the Western Australian Legislative Assembly and Western Australian Legislative Council associated with the governing party or coalition. However, in Labor ministries generally, and the Nationalist Lefroy Ministry (1917–1919), Cabinet's composition is chosen by caucus (a meeting of all Parliamentary members of the party) rather than by the Premier. The Ministry must command the support of the Legislative Assembly—if it either loses a vote of no confidence on the floor of the Assembly, or loses a general election and hence a majority in the Assembly, it is expected to resign and the Opposition Leader, as prospective Premier, is then expected to form a Ministry.

The Constitution of Western Australia does not require Ministers to be members of Parliament, but provides that non-members can only be Ministers for a maximum of three months. This means that when a Government loses an election, the Ministry remains in office (in "caretaker mode") until a new Ministry is presented to the Governor for appointment. For example, when the state election on 6 September 2008 produced a defeat for the Labor government, the Labor ministers remained in office until 23 September 2008, when Premier Colin Barnett appointed a new Ministry.

Until 1948, it was necessary for Ministers, when appointed, to resign their seat in Parliament and re-contest it at a ministerial by-election. Ministers lost these by-elections on two occasions: in 1901, when half the Morgans Ministry were defeated; and in 1917, when John Scaddan was defeated upon his appointment to the Lefroy Ministry.

== List of Western Australian ministries ==
Name	Premier	Party	Date appointed	Date replaced	Reason for replacement
Forrest ministry	Sir John Forrest	Ministerial	29 December 1890	14 February 1901	Premier entered federal politics
Throssell ministry	George Throssell	Ministerial	15 February 1901	27 May 1901	Lacked support in Assembly
Leake ministry (1st)	George Leake	Opposition	27 May 1901	21 November 1901	Lost confidence motion in Assembly
Morgans ministry	Alf Morgans	Ministerial	21 November 1901	23 December 1901	Lost confidence motion in Assembly
Leake ministry (2nd)	George Leake	Opposition	23 December 1901	1 July 1902	Premier died in office
James ministry	Walter James	Opposition	1 July 1902	10 August 1904	Lost election
Daglish ministry	Henry Daglish	Labor	10 August 1904	25 August 1905	Lost confidence motion in Assembly
Rason ministry	Cornthwaite Rason	Ministerial	25 August 1905	7 May 1906	Premier resigned
Moore ministry	Sir Newton Moore	Ministerial	7 May 1906	16 September 1910	Premier resigned
Wilson ministry (1st)	Frank Wilson	Ministerial	16 September 1910	7 October 1911	Lost election
Scaddan ministry	John Scaddan	Labor	7 October 1911	27 July 1916	Lost confidence motion in Assembly
Wilson ministry (2nd)	Frank Wilson	WA Liberal	27 July 1916	28 June 1917	Ministry collapsed
Lefroy ministry	Sir Henry Lefroy	Nationalist	28 June 1917	17 April 1919	Premier resigned
Colebatch ministry	Hal Colebatch	Nationalist	17 April 1919	17 May 1919	Ministry collapsed
Mitchell ministry (1st)	Sir James Mitchell	Nationalist	17 May 1919	15 April 1924	Lost election
Collier ministry (1st)	Philip Collier	Labor	16 April 1924	23 April 1930	Lost election
Mitchell ministry (2nd)	James Mitchell	Nationalist	24 April 1930	24 April 1933	Lost election
Collier ministry (2nd)	Philip Collier	Labor	24 April 1933	19 August 1936	Premier retired
Willcock ministry	John Willcock	Labor	20 August 1936	31 July 1945	Premier retired
Wise ministry	Frank Wise	Labor	31 July 1945	1 April 1947	Lost election
McLarty–Watts ministry	Ross McLarty	Liberal-Country	1 April 1947	23 February 1953	Lost election
Hawke ministry	Bert Hawke	Labor	23 February 1953	2 April 1959	Lost election
Brand–Watts ministry	Sir David Brand	Liberal-Country	2 April 1959	11 April 1962	Deputy Premier retired
Brand–Nalder ministry	Sir David Brand	Liberal-Country	12 April 1962	3 March 1971	Lost election
Tonkin ministry	John Tonkin	Labor	3 March 1971	8 April 1974	Lost election
Court–McPharlin ministry	Sir Charles Court	Liberal-Country	8 April 1974	5 June 1975	Deputy Premier resigned
Court ministry	Sir Charles Court	Liberal-National Country	5 June 1975	25 January 1982	Premier resigned
O'Connor ministry	Ray O'Connor	Liberal-National Country	25 January 1982	25 February 1983	Lost election
Burke ministry	Brian Burke	Labor	25 February 1983	25 February 1988	Premier resigned
Dowding ministry	Peter Dowding	Labor	25 February 1988	18 February 1990	Premier deposed by caucus
Lawrence ministry	Carmen Lawrence	Labor	19 February 1990	16 February 1993	Lost election
Court–Cowan ministry	Richard Court	Liberal-National	16 February 1993	16 February 2001	Lost election
Gallop ministry	Geoff Gallop	Labor	16 February 2001	3 February 2006	Premier resigned
Carpenter ministry	Alan Carpenter	Labor	3 February 2006	23 September 2008	Lost election
Barnett ministry	Colin Barnett	Liberal	23 September 2008	17 March 2017	Lost election
First McGowan ministry	Mark McGowan	Labor	17 March 2017	19 March 2021	
Second McGowan ministry	Mark McGowan	Labor	19 March 2021	8 June 2023	Premier resigned
First Cook ministry	Roger Cook	Labor	8 June 2023	8 March 2025	
Second Cook ministry	Roger Cook	Labor	9 March 2025		

== See also ==
- Members of the Western Australian Legislative Assembly
- Members of the Western Australian Legislative Council
