= Department of the Premier and Cabinet (Western Australia) =

Western Australian government department

Department overview
- Formed: 2001
- Jurisdiction: Government of Western Australia
- Headquarters: Dumas House, 2 Havelock Street, West Perth
- Department executive: Emily Roper, Director General
- Website: www.wa.gov.au/organisation/department-of-the-premier-and-cabinet

The Department of the Premier and Cabinet is a department of the Government of Western Australia. The department was formed in 2001 under the Public Sector Management Act 1994.

The department was one of the few that remained mostly unaffected by the 2017 restructuring of the Western Australian government departments, which resulted in the number of departments being reduced from 41 to 25.

The department is responsible for providing policy and administrative advice and support to the Premier of Western Australia and Cabinet Ministers.

In May 2021, the department was one of eight Western Australian Government departments to receive a new Director General with Emily Roper being appointed to the role effective from 31 May 2021.
