= Ted Needham =

Australian politician (1874–1956)

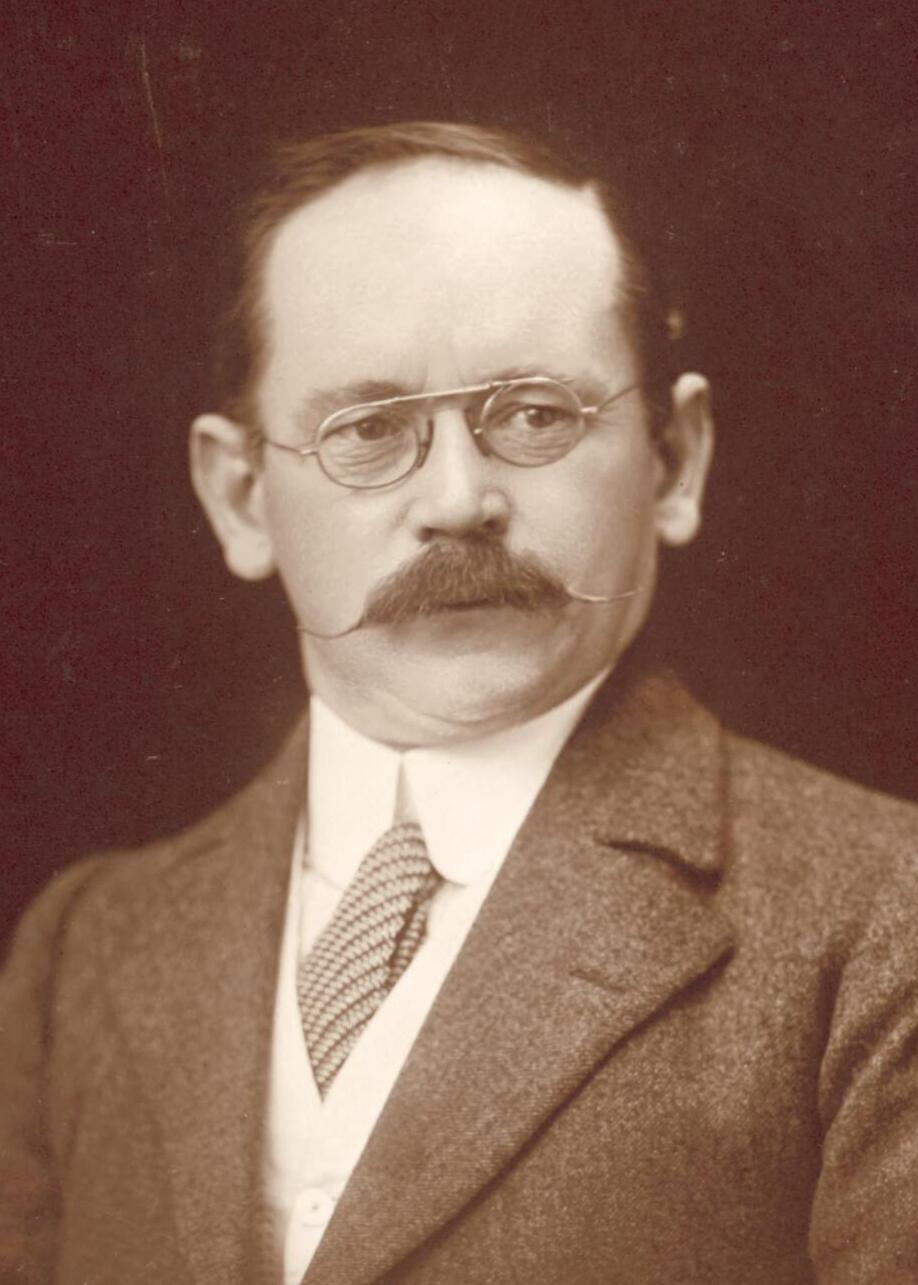

Leader of the Opposition in the Senate
- In office 9 July 1926 – 25 June 1929
- Preceded by: Albert Gardiner
- Succeeded by: John Daly

Senator for Western Australia
- In office 1 July 1923 – 30 June 1929
- In office 1 July 1907 – 30 June 1920

Member of the Western Australian Legislative Assembly
- In office 25 March 1950 – 14 February 1953
- Preceded by: Arthur Abbott
- Succeeded by: Stan Lapham
- Constituency: North Perth
- In office 8 April 1933 – 25 March 1950
- Preceded by: Harry Mann
- Succeeded by: Abolished
- Constituency: Perth
- In office 28 June 1904 – 27 October 1905
- Preceded by: John Higham
- Succeeded by: James Price
- Constituency: Fremantle

Personal details
- Born: 30 September 1874 Ormskirk, Lancashire, England
- Died: 26 October 1956 (aged 82) Subiaco, Western Australia, Australia
- Party: Labor
- Spouse: Lillian Gosden (m. 1908)
- Occupation: Labourer

Edward Needham (30 September 1874 – 26 October 1956) was an Australian politician. He was a long-serving member of the parliament for the Australian Labor Party (ALP) in both state and federal politics. He served as a Senator for Western Australia from 1907 to 1920 and 1923 to 1929, including as Leader of the Opposition in the Senate from 1926 to 1929. He was also a member of the Western Australian Legislative Assembly from 1904 to 1905 and from 1933 to 1953. He worked various jobs as a manual labourer prior to entering politics and was active in the labour movement.

== Early life ==
Needham was likely born on 30 September 1874 in Ormskirk, Lancashire, England, although 16 October 1870 has also been given as a possible birth date. He was the son of Margaret (née Fahy) and Patrick Needham; his parents were Irish Catholics and his father was working as a labourer at the time of his birth.

Needham was educated at St Mary's Catholic School in Sunderland and at Seaham College in Seaham. He left school in 1886 at the age of twelve and began working as a trapper boy at a coal mine in Seaham. In 1888, he and his family moved to Scotland where he worked at a power loom weaving factory in Paisley and at various shipyards on Clydeside. He was active in the labour movement from a young age and in 1890, aged 16, was elected president of the Renfrew branch of the Amalgamated Society of Shipyard Helpers. He was also active in friendly societies.

== First years in Australia ==
Needham immigrated to Australia in 1901 and settled in Fremantle, Western Australia, reportedly "entirely without friends or relatives anywhere on the Australian continent". His first job was at the Rocky Bay quarry in North Fremantle. In 1902 he joined Western Australian Government Railways as a boilermaker's assistant at the Fremantle Railway Workshops. He remained active in the labour movement and in the same year was elected as a vice-president of the Fremantle branch of the Amalgamated Society of Railway Employees.

In 1903, Needham was involved in establishing the Fremantle division of the Australian Labor Party (ALP) and elected as treasurer on the division's provisional committee. He was elected to the Western Australian Legislative Assembly at the 1904 state election, winning the seat of Fremantle for the ALP for the first time.

Needham supported the short-lived government of Henry Daglish, Western Australia's first ALP premier, which collapsed on a confidence motion after a year. He lost his seat to James Price at the resulting 1905 state election and made an unsuccessful attempt to reclaim the seat at a ministerial by-election in 1906. He was unemployed for a period after his defeat and subsequently sold life insurance for the National Mutual Life Assurance Society.

== Federal politics ==
=== Senator, 1907–1920 ===
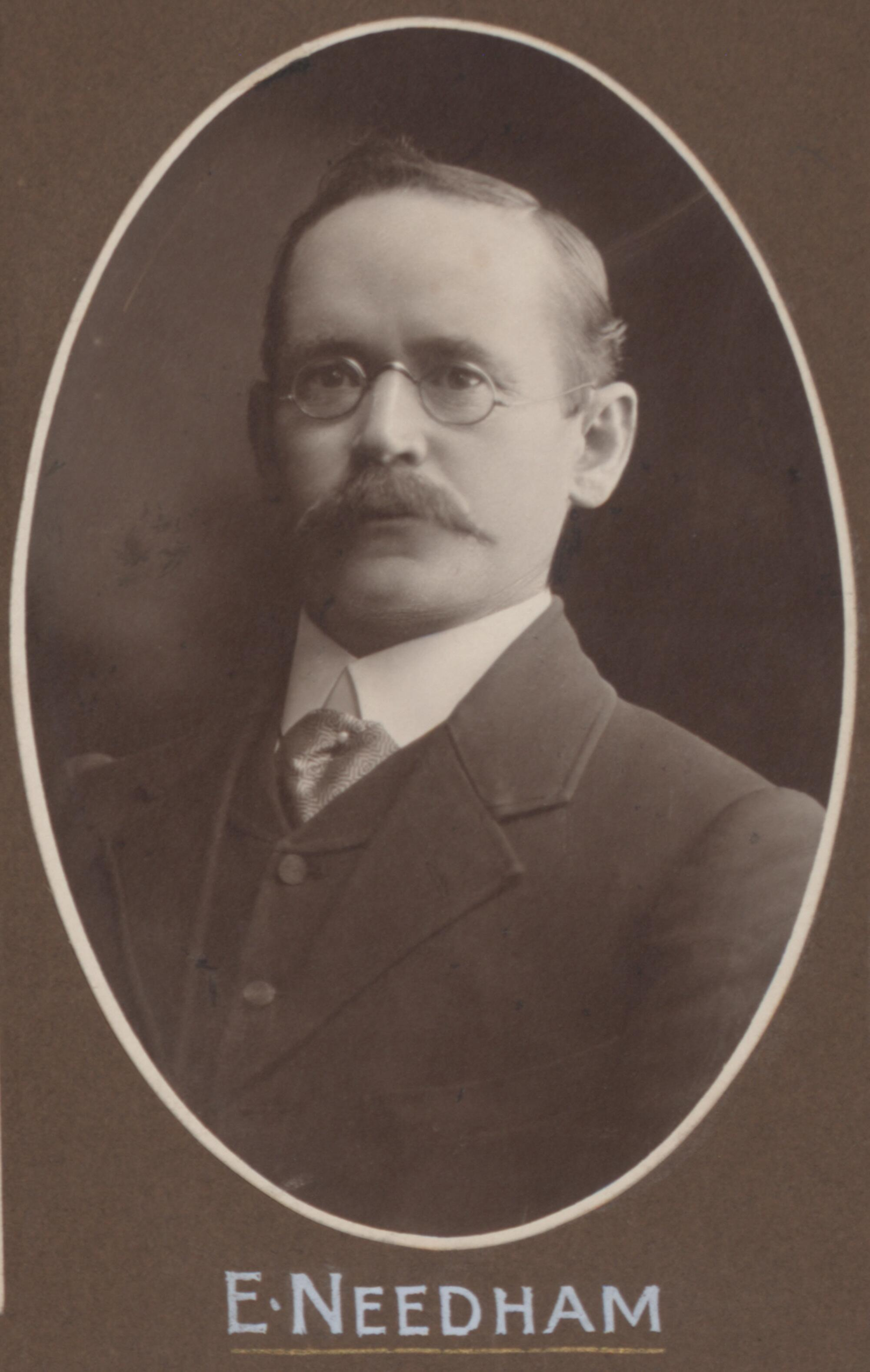
Needham in 1908

At the 1906 federal election, Needham was elected as one of three ALP senators for Western Australia, winning a six-year term beginning on 1 July 1907. He was re-elected to a second term at the 1913 election, which was cut short by a double dissolution, and then to a further term at the 1914 election.

In his first years in parliament, Needham was a strong advocate for an independent Australian navy and the discontinuance of Australia's annual "naval subsidy" to the Royal Navy. In 1908 he introduced the private senator's bill that became the Commonwealth Conciliation and Arbitration Act 1909, the first such bill to become law. His bill allowed the Commonwealth Court of Conciliation and Arbitration to implement "penalties against employers dismissing employees because of union activity, and against employees refusing to work for employers because of activity in employers' associations".

During the ALP split over conscription in 1916, Needham sided with anti-conscription elements in the ALP and was the only Labor senator in Western Australia not to defect to the National Labor Party. He was subsequently elected to the ALP's parliamentary executive and also served as the party's Senate whip from 1917 to 1920. Needham was a strong advocate for the "No" vote during the 1917 conscription referendum. However, he was not anti-war and served on the parliamentary recruiting committee from 1917 to 1918. He was defeated for re-election at the 1919 election, likely due to Western Australia's pro-conscription stance.

=== Senator, 1923–1929 ===
Following his defeat, Needham unsuccessfully sought to return to the Western Australian Legislative Assembly at the 1921 state election, running unsuccessfully in the seat of North Perth. He was acting state secretary of the ALP in 1922.

Needham was re-elected to the Senate at the 1922 federal election, winning a six-year term beginning on 1 July 1923. He served on the Joint Committee on Public Accounts from 1923 to 1926, where he opposed the committee's majority report recommending the sale of the Commonwealth Line. He was elected as his party's deputy Senate leader in 1925 and in 1926 succeeded Albert Gardiner as Leader of the Opposition in the Senate; by this point he was one of only seven ALP senators.

Needham was defeated for re-election at the 1928 federal election, with his term concluding on 30 June 1929. He unsuccessfully stood for federal parliament on two further occasions, contesting the House of Representatives seat of Perth at the 1929 election and recontesting the Senate at the 1931 election.

== Return to state politics ==
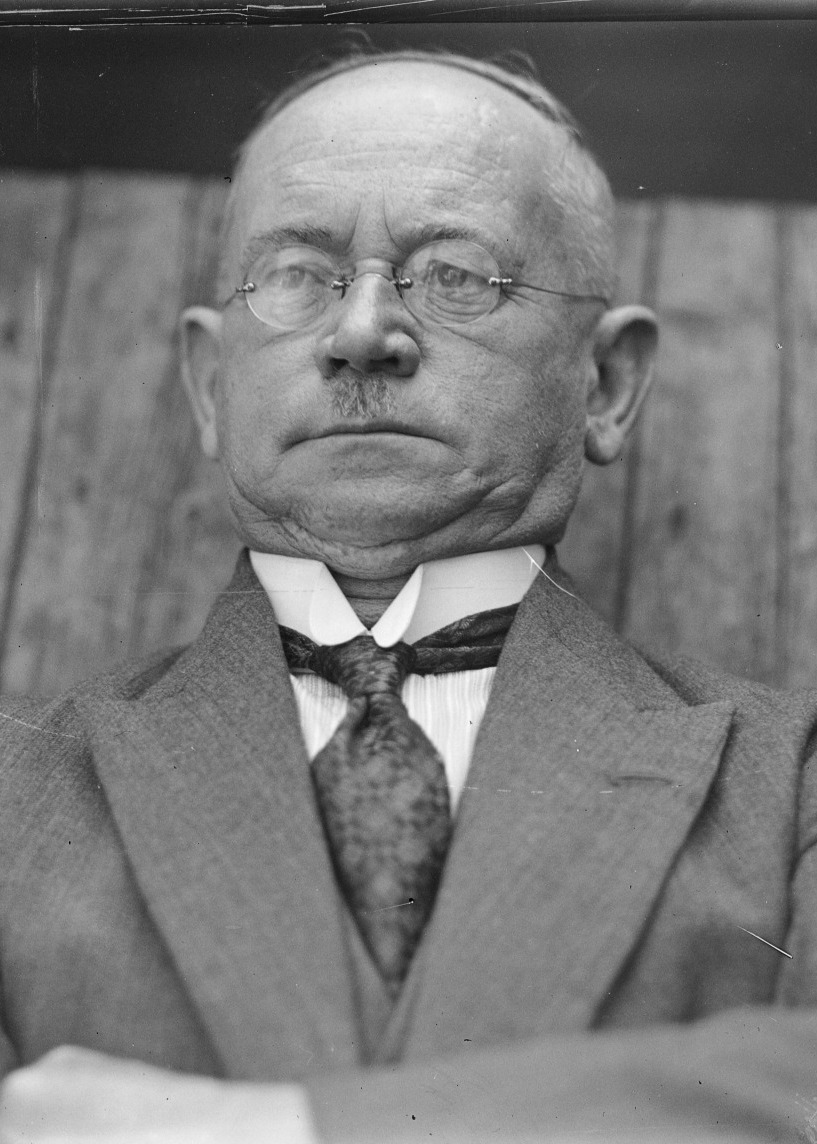
Needham in 1930

At the 1933 state election, Needham won the Legislative Assembly seat of Perth on his second attempt, following an unsuccessful candidacy in 1930. He transferred to the seat of North Perth at the 1950 state election and retired at the 1953 election. He never held ministerial office, but during his final term was given a seat on the opposition frontbench as a mark of respect. On the announcement of his retirement, he was described in The West Australian as "a battler for the underdog, easily available to his electors, and never dodging anyone, not even cranks obsessed with hopeless propositions".

== Personal life ==
In 1908, Needham married Lilian Gosden, with whom he had two sons. Outside of politics he was active in various community organisations, including as a councillor of the Western Australian Industrial School for the Blind, president of the Civilian Maimed and Limbless Association of Western Australia, as a board member of Perth Hospital, and as vice-president of the Australian Advisory Council for the Physically Handicapped.

Needham died on 26 October 1956 at St John of God Hospital Subiaco, aged 82.

Party political offices
Preceded by George Pearce	Leader of the Australian Labor Party in the Senate; 1926–1929	Succeeded by John Daly
Honorary titles
Preceded by George Pearce	Earliest serving living Senator; 1952 – 1956	Succeeded by Rudolph Ready
