= James Price (Australian politician) =

Australian politician

The Honourable James Price

Member of the Legislative Assembly of Western Australia
- In office 27 October 1905 – 21 May 1910
- Preceded by: Ted Needham
- Succeeded by: William Murphy
- Constituency: Fremantle

Personal details
- Born: 6 August 1864 Wimbledon, Surrey, England
- Died: 21 May 1910 (aged 45) Cape Town, South Africa

James Price (6 August 1864 – 21 May 1910) was an Australian politician who was a member of the Legislative Assembly of Western Australia from 1905 until his death, representing the seat of Fremantle. He served as a minister in the government of Newton Moore.

Price was born in Wimbledon, Surrey, England. He worked at the London Coal Exchange before migrating to South Australia in 1891, where he took up farming at Renmark. Price moved to Western Australia in 1897, establishing a steam laundry in Fremantle. He was elected to the North Fremantle Municipal Council in 1901. At the 1905 state election, he stood for parliament as a Ministerialist (a supporter of the government of Hector Rason), and defeated the sitting Labor candidate, Ted Needham.

In May 1906, following Rason's resignation, Price was named Minister for Works in the new ministry formed by Newton Moore, although he had been in parliament for less than a year. He resigned in June 1909 on medical grounds, but was retained in the ministry as an honorary minister. In early 1910, Price left Australia for what was described as a "health trip" to England. He was taken ill on the voyage, and was taken to hospital once his ship had reached Cape Town, South Africa, where he lingered for two months before dying. James Price Point, a geographical feature in the Kimberley, was named in his honour, as was Price Street in South Fremantle.

Parliament of Western Australia
Preceded by Ted Needham	Member for Fremantle; 1905–1910	Succeeded by William Murphy
Political offices
Preceded by Frank Wilson	Minister for Works; 1906–1909	Succeeded by Frank Wilson
