= Municipality of North Fremantle =

Former local government area in Western Australia

Coordinates: 32°02′02″S 115°45′22″E

- Local government area
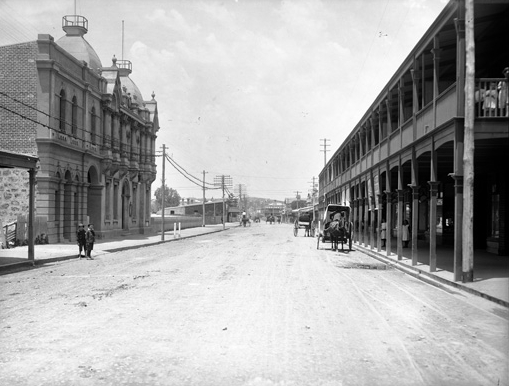
- Victoria Avenue, North Fremantle, later renamed Queen Victoria Street. North Fremantle Town Hall on the left.
- Country: Australia
- State: Western Australia
- Region: Perth metropolitan region
- Established: 1871
- Council seat: North Fremantle

Area
  - Total: 3 km^{2} (1.2 sq mi)

Population
  - Total: 2,363 (1961 census)
  - Density: 790/km^{2} (2,000/sq mi)

The Municipality of North Fremantle was a local government area in metropolitan Perth across the Swan River from Fremantle.

== History ==
On 13 September 1895, the Municipality of North Fremantle was declared. On 1 July 1961, it became a Town following enactment of the Local Government Act 1960. It amalgamated into the City of Fremantle on 1 November 1961.

== Notable councillors ==
- Alf Morgans
- James Price

== Suburbs ==
The suburb of North Fremantle was the only suburb within this local government area.

== Populations ==
Year	Population
1911	3,331
1921	3,545
1933	3,108
1947	5,442
1954	2,890
1961	2,363
