= Robert Hastie =

Australian politician

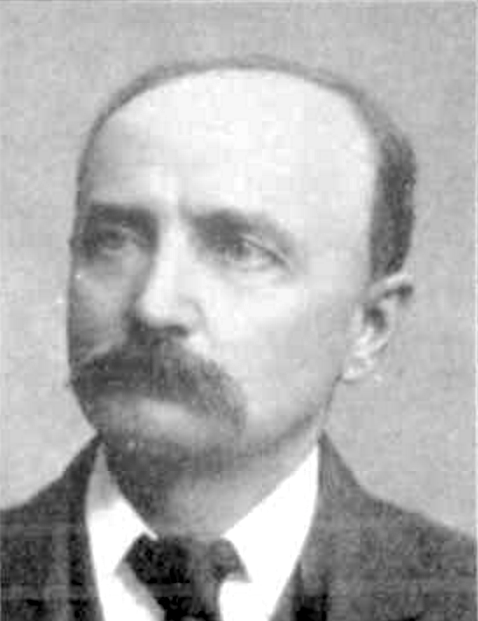

Leader of the Labour Party (Note: The party has spelled its name without a "u" (i.e., as "Labor") since 1912.) in Western Australia
- In office 10 May 1901 – 8 July 1904
- Preceded by: None (new position)
- Succeeded by: Henry Daglish

Member of the Legislative Assembly of Western Australia
- In office 24 April 1901 – 27 October 1905
- Preceded by: None (new seat)
- Succeeded by: Thomas Walker
- Constituency: Kanowna

Personal details
- Born: 27 July 1861 Glasgow, Scotland
- Died: 9 April 1914 (aged 52) Hawthorn, Victoria, Australia
- Party: Labour (to 1905); Commonwealth Liberal (1910)

Robert Hastie (27 July 1861 – 9 April 1914) was an Australian politician who was the first parliamentary leader of the Labour Party in Western Australia. He was a member of the state's Legislative Assembly from 1901 to 1905.

Hastie was born in Glasgow, Scotland, and spent time in New Zealand and Victoria before arriving in Western Australia in 1895 during the gold rush. Prominent in the labour movement on the Eastern Goldfields, he entered parliament at the 1901 state election, and was elected party leader shortly after. Hastie was replaced as leader by Henry Daglish in July 1904, who became premier the following month. He served as a minister in Daglish's government, but was defeated for preselection at the early 1905 election. Hastie eventually left the Labour Party, and unsuccessfully stood for the Commonwealth Liberal Party at the 1910 federal election.

== Early life ==
Hastie was born in Glasgow, Scotland, to Christina (née Stewart) and William Hastie, his father being a British Army soldier. He studied at the Andersonian Institute in Glasgow, and then as a young man emigrated to New Zealand. (Note: The year that Hastie left for New Zealand has been given in various sources as 1877, 1880, 1885, and 1889.) He spent five years in the North Island, including a period prospecting in Thames (the site of an earlier gold rush). In 1890, Hastie moved to Victoria, where he spent another five years before coming to Western Australia. Settling in the Eastern Goldfields, he spent a short time prospecting in the Coolgardie area, and then moved to Boulder, where he spent a few years before moving on to Kanowna. On the goldfields, Hastie became involved with the union movement, and eventually became president of the local branch of the Amalgamated Workers' Association (AWA), an early general union. He was a frequent letter-writer to local newspapers, sometimes under a pseudonym, and was the organiser a weekly lecture series in Kanowna. A 1901 article in the Westralian Worker noted that Hastie had been "an active and leading member" in both the movement for federation and the Goldfields secession movement.

== Parliamentary career ==
At the 1901 state election, Hastie stood for the seat of Kanowna, which was one of a number of new seats created in the Eastern Goldfields. He faced five other candidates, all running for the Opposition faction (which opposed the government of George Throssell), but polled exactly 60 percent of the vote to record a large victory. Of the six successful Labour candidates, only Fergie Reid (69.0%) and John Reside (68.3%) polled higher percentages. At the first meeting of the Labour caucus after the election, on 10 May, Hastie was elected to the party's leadership. His leadership was renewed twice, in July 1902 and July 1903. Because the Labour Party did not form the official opposition (instead sitting on the crossbench), Hastie never became Leader of the Opposition. On at least one occasion, in August 1903, approaches were made to other non-government members about the Labour Party forming an official opposition, but they were rebuffed.

At the 1904 state election, held on 28 June, the Labour Party won 22 seats and became the largest party in parliament, four seats short of forming a majority government. Hastie was re-elected to his own seat unopposed. At the first post-election meeting of the Labour caucus, on 8 July, he announced that he did not wish to be remain leader of the party, and was replaced by Henry Daglish, who was elected almost unanimously (George Taylor being the only other candidate). On 10 August, Daglish became premier at the head of a Labor minority government. Hastie therefore narrowly missed becoming the first Labor Premier of Western Australia. Hastie was appointed Minister for Justice and Minister for Mines in the new ministry. As Minister for Justice, he was the state's top legal officer, and was responsible for the administration of the Crown Law Department. In all previous ministries, the top legal officer had held the title of the Attorney-General, but Hastie had no formal legal training and that title was felt to be inappropriate. William Sayer, the Crown Solicitor (equivalent to solicitor-general), was appointed acting attorney-general to fulfil certain constitutional requirements, but was not a formal member of the ministry.

In a ministerial reshuffle in June 1905, Hastie replaced John Holman as Minister for Labour, but lost the mines portfolio to William Johnson. He remained in the ministry only until August 1905, when the Daglish government was defeated on a confidence motion. The new premier, Hector Rason, called an early election for November 1905. Hastie stood for Labour preselection in Kanowna for a third time, but was defeated by Thomas Walker (who went on to hold the seat until his death in 1932). He placed only third out of five candidates, with 19.1 percent of the vote.

== Later life ==
After leaving parliament, Hastie went into business in Perth as a mining and commercial agent. He remained involved in public life, giving several lectures on political topics at the Perth Trades Hall. In May 1906, Hastie sued the Kalgoorlie Sun for libel, claiming £1,000 in damages for an article in January 1906 that he believed portrayed him as corrupt. The jury found against him, and awarded costs to the defendants. Later in 1906, he testified before a royal commission into gold stealing, which eventually resulted in the creation of the Gold Stealing Detection Unit of the Western Australia Police. In August 1908, Hastie announced himself as a candidate for the seat of Perth at the 1908 state election. However, he withdrew before the close of nominations in order to support another candidate.

In January 1910, Hastie announced his intention to contest the Division of Coolgardie at the 1910 federal election, standing for the Commonwealth Liberal Party against the sitting Labour member, Hugh Mahon. A Kalgoorlie newspaper speculated that "ingratitude for services rendered" was the cause of his defection, while The Sunday Times of Perth reported Hastie as saying "I haven't left the Labor Party, the Labor Party has left me". In a speech at Kookynie during his campaign, Hastie stated that his political positions were unchanged, but that he was no longer willing to bind himself to any political party. Hastie lost the election to Mahon by a large margin, polling 23.8 percent of the vote. However, the swing to the Labour Party was just 2.3 points, compared to the nationwide swing of 13.3 points. In late 1910, Hastie joined in the rush to Bullfinch (near Southern Cross), representing the interests of a Perth gold-mining syndicate.

In August 1913, Hastie was hospitalised in Perth after being struck with aphasia (an inability to speak or write). As he was "absolutely without means", an appeal was made for funds to support him, which raised over £110. On the advice of doctors, Hastie travelled to Melbourne later in the year, with the hope that the long sea journey would aid his recovery. He was hospitalised again in December, and died in Melbourne in April 1914, aged 53. He was unmarried.

== Notes ==
Parliament of Western Australia
New seat	Member for Kanowna; 1901–1905	Succeeded by Thomas Walker
Political offices
Preceded by Walter James	Minister for Justice; 1904–1905	Succeeded by Hector Rason
Preceded by Henry Gregory	Minister for Mines; 1904–1905	Succeeded by William Johnson
Preceded by John Holman	Minister for Labour; 1905	Succeeded by John Sydney Hicks
