= Shadow Cabinet of Harold Wilson =

Harold Wilson formed a total of two non-consecutive Shadow Cabinets:

- First Shadow Cabinet of Harold Wilson, 1963–1964
- Second Shadow Cabinet of Harold Wilson, 1970–1974
