= Premier of Western Australia =

Head of government of Western Australia

- Western Australian coat of arms

- Flag of Western Australia

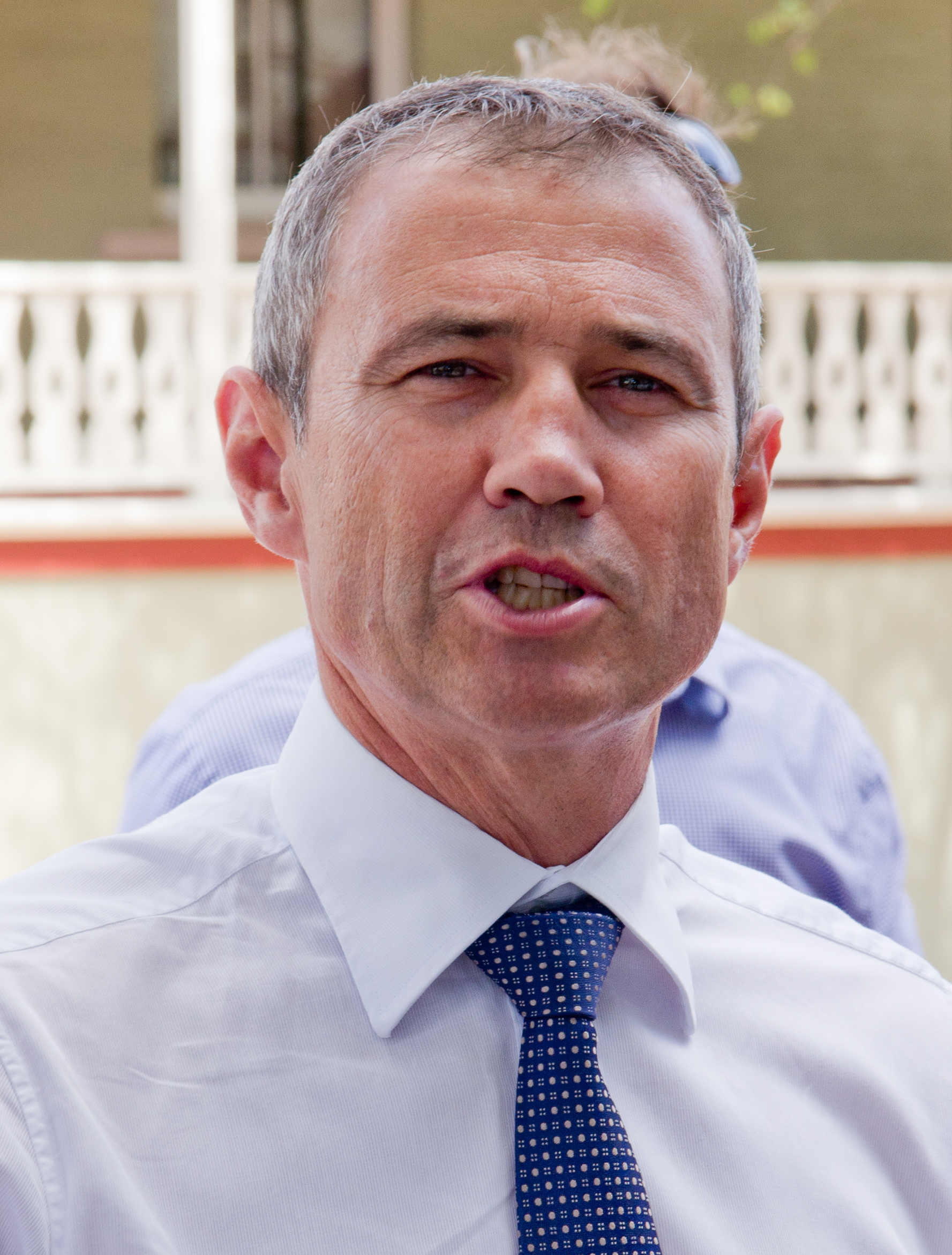
- Incumbent; Roger Cook since 8 June 2023
- Department of the Premier and Cabinet
- Style: The Honourable (formal); Premier (informal)
- Status: Head of government
- Member of: Parliament; National Cabinet; Cabinet; Executive Council
- Reports to: Parliament
- Seat: Dumas House, Perth
- Appointer: Governor of Western Australia; by convention, based on appointee's ability to command confidence in the Legislative Assembly
- Term length: At the governor's pleasure; contingent on the premier's ability to command confidence in the lower house of Parliament
- Constituting instrument: None (constitutional convention)
- Formation: 29 December 1890
- First holder: John Forrest
- Deputy: Deputy Premier of Western Australia
- Salary: A$355,681
- Website: www.premier.wa.gov.au

The premier of Western Australia is the head of government of the state of Western Australia. The role of premier at a state level is similar to the role of the prime minister of Australia at a federal level. The premier leads the executive branch of the Government of Western Australia and is accountable to the Parliament of Western Australia. The premier is appointed by the governor of Western Australia. By convention, the governor appoints as premier whoever has the support of the majority of the Western Australian Legislative Assembly, the lower house of the Parliament of Western Australia. In practice, this means that the premier is the leader of the political party or group of parties with a majority of seats in the Legislative Assembly. Since Western Australia achieved self-governance in 1890, there have been 31 premiers. Roger Cook is the current premier, having been appointed to the position on 8 June 2023.

== History ==
The position of premier is not mentioned in the constitution of Western Australia. From 1890 to 1917, the premier was not an official position, rather, it was the title unofficially given, but widely used to refer, to the head of the government. When Western Australia became a self-governing colony in 1890, Governor William Robinson initially indicated he would use the title prime minister to refer to the head of the government. However, after he appointed John Forrest, the title premier was used for consistency with the other Australian colonies. The position was first officially mentioned when the governor appointed Henry Lefroy as premier on 28 June 1917. However, when the governor designated and declared the six executive offices of the government on 2 July 1917, the position of premier was not listed, creating an ambiguity. It was not until 3 April 1947 that the premier became one of the executive offices of the government.

The most common cause for a change of premier is an election. Since the 1990s, elections have occurred roughly every four years. Before then, elections were at most three years apart, except for during World War II. A less common cause for a change of premier is the ruling party changing its leader. This can occur as a result of a resignation, death or leadership spill. In this case, the new premier is whoever the party elects as its new leader. Another cause for a change of premier is a loss of majority support in the Legislative Assembly. This commonly occurred in the first three decades of self-governance, but has not occurred since 1916. If this occurs, the premier must either resign or be dismissed by the governor.

== Powers and function ==
The powers of the premier are set out by convention and by legislation. By convention, the premier advises the Monarch of Australia as to who to appoint as governor. The premier advises the governor as to who to appoint to cabinet and which portfolios should be given to each cabinet minister. The premier sets out the responsibilities of ministers and the acts that they would administer. The premier leads the cabinet and chairs cabinet meetings. They communicate with the governor, the cabinet, the state government, other state and territory governments, the federal government, and overseas governments. The premier advises the governor on when state elections should be held. They oversee the Department of the Premier and Cabinet. While premier, they stay as a member of parliament and they retain their responsibility for representing their electoral district.

== Characteristics ==
As of 2023, there have been 31 premiers of Western Australia. Carmen Lawrence, who was appointed on 12 February 1990, is the first and only woman to be premier of Western Australia. She is also the first woman to be premier of an Australian state. By convention, the premier is a member of the Legislative Assembly. However, the premier can be a member of either house of parliament. Hal Colebatch is the only premier to be a member of the Legislative Council (upper house). He served for 30 days in 1919, making him the shortest serving premier of Western Australia. David Brand is the longest serving premier, serving for 11 years and 335 days between 1959 and 1971. The youngest premier is John Scaddan, who was 35 years, 2 months and 3 days old when he was sworn in in 1911. The oldest premier is John Tonkin, who was 69 years, 1 month and 1 day old when he was sworn in in 1971. Newton Moore became premier after two years in parliament, the least time aside from Forrest. Tonkin became premier after almost 38 years in parliament, the most time in parliament before becoming premier. The only father and son pair to have both been premier is Charles Court and his son Richard Court. George Leake, who died of pneumonia on 24 June 1902, is the only premier to have died in office. Moore, Philip Collier, John Willcock and Geoff Gallop are the only premiers to have resigned due to ill health.

Forrest, Colebatch and Lawrence are the only premiers to have served in the Parliament of Australia as well. Forrest and Lawrence are the only premiers to have been ministers in the Government of Australia as well. Moore is the only premier to have served in the House of Commons of the United Kingdom. The only premier to subsequently serve as governor is James Mitchell. George Leake, Frank Wilson, Phillip Collier and Mitchell are the only people to have been premier more than once. There are currently eight living former premiers. The most recent premier to die is Ray O'Connor, who was premier from 1982 to 1983 and died in 2013.

Two former premiers have been sentenced to jail. In 1994, Brian Burke was sentenced to two years in jail for defrauding the state by $17,000 by making false claims on the parliamentary imprest account. He was released on parole after serving seven months. In 1995, O'Connor served six months in jail for stealing a $25,000 cheque from the Bond Corporation during his time as premier. In 1997, Burke was sentenced to three years jail for stealing $122,585 in Labor Party campaign donations. He served six months before this conviction was quashed upon appeal.

== List of premiers of Western Australia ==
No.	Portrait	Name (Birth–death) Constituency	Election	Term of office			Political party	Ministry	Monarch	Governor	Ref.
No.	Portrait	Name (Birth–death) Constituency	Election	Took office	Left office	Time in office	Political party	Ministry	Monarch	Governor	Ref.
1		Sir John Forrest (1847–1918) MLA for Bunbury 1890–1901	1890; 1894; 1897	29 December 1890	14 February 1901	10 years, 48 days	None	Forrest ministry	Victoria	Frederick Broome	
1		Sir John Forrest (1847–1918) MLA for Bunbury 1890–1901	1890; 1894; 1897	29 December 1890	14 February 1901	10 years, 48 days	None	Forrest ministry	Victoria	William Robinson	
1		Sir John Forrest (1847–1918) MLA for Bunbury 1890–1901	1890; 1894; 1897	29 December 1890	14 February 1901	10 years, 48 days	None	Forrest ministry	Victoria	Gerard Smith	
1		Sir John Forrest (1847–1918) MLA for Bunbury 1890–1901	1890; 1894; 1897	29 December 1890	14 February 1901	10 years, 48 days	None	Forrest ministry	Edward VII	Gerard Smith	
2		George Throssell (1840–1910) MLA for Northam 1890–1904 MLC for East Province 1907–1910	1901	14 February 1901	27 May 1901	101 days	None	Throssell ministry	Edward VII	Gerard Smith	
2		George Throssell (1840–1910) MLA for Northam 1890–1904 MLC for East Province 1907–1910	1901	14 February 1901	27 May 1901	101 days	None	Throssell ministry	Edward VII	Arthur Lawley	
3		George Leake (1856–1902) MLA for Roebourne 1890 MLA for Albany 1894–1900 MLA for West Perth 1901–1902	—	27 May 1901	21 November 1901	178 days	None	First Leake ministry	Edward VII	Arthur Lawley	
4		Alf Morgans (1850–1933) MLA for Coolgardie 1897–1904	—	21 November 1901	23 December 1901	32 days	None	Morgans ministry	Edward VII	Arthur Lawley	
(3)		George Leake (1856–1902) MLA for Roebourne 1890 MLA for Albany 1894–1900 MLA for West Perth 1901–1902	—	23 December 1901	24 June 1902	190 days	None	Second Leake ministry	Edward VII	Arthur Lawley	
5		Sir Walter James (1863–1943) MLA for East Perth 1894–1904	—	1 July 1902	10 August 1904	2 years, 40 days	None	James ministry	Edward VII	Arthur Lawley	
5		Sir Walter James (1863–1943) MLA for East Perth 1894–1904	—	1 July 1902	10 August 1904	2 years, 40 days	None	James ministry	Edward VII	Frederick Bedford	
6		Henry Daglish (1866–1920) MLA for Subiaco 1901–1911	1904	10 August 1904	25 August 1905	1 year, 15 days	Labor	Daglish ministry	Edward VII	Frederick Bedford	
7		Sir Hector Rason (1858–1927) MLC for Swan 1889–1890 MLA for South Murchison 1897–1901 MLA for Guildford 1901–1906	1905	25 August 1905	7 May 1906	255 days	None	Rason ministry	Edward VII	Frederick Bedford	
8		Sir Newton Moore (1870–1936) MLA for Bunbury 1904–1911	1908	7 May 1906	16 September 1910	4 years, 132 days	None	Moore ministry	Edward VII	Frederick Bedford	
8		Sir Newton Moore (1870–1936) MLA for Bunbury 1904–1911	1908	7 May 1906	16 September 1910	4 years, 132 days	None	Moore ministry	Edward VII	Gerald Strickland	
8		Sir Newton Moore (1870–1936) MLA for Bunbury 1904–1911	1908	7 May 1906	16 September 1910	4 years, 132 days	None	Moore ministry	George V	Gerald Strickland	
9		Frank Wilson (1859–1918) MLA for Canning 1897–1901 MLA for Perth 1901 MLA for Sussex 1904–1917	—	16 September 1910	7 October 1911	1 year, 21 days	None	First Wilson ministry	George V	Gerald Strickland	
10		John Scaddan (1876–1934) MLA for Ivanhoe 1904–1911 MLA for Brown Hill-Ivanhoe 1911–1916 1916–1917 MLA for Albany 1919–1924 MLA for Maylands 1930–1933	1911; 1914	7 October 1911	27 July 1916	4 years, 294 days	Labor	Scaddan ministry	George V	Gerald Strickland	
10		John Scaddan (1876–1934) MLA for Ivanhoe 1904–1911 MLA for Brown Hill-Ivanhoe 1911–1916 1916–1917 MLA for Albany 1919–1924 MLA for Maylands 1930–1933	1911; 1914	7 October 1911	27 July 1916	4 years, 294 days	Labor	Scaddan ministry	George V	Harry Barron	
(9)		Frank Wilson (1859–1918) MLA for Canning 1897–1901 MLA for Perth 1901 MLA for Sussex 1904–1917	—	27 July 1916	28 June 1917	336 days	Liberal	Second Wilson ministry	George V	Harry Barron	
(9)		Frank Wilson (1859–1918) MLA for Canning 1897–1901 MLA for Perth 1901 MLA for Sussex 1904–1917	—	27 July 1916	28 June 1917	336 days	Liberal	Second Wilson ministry	George V	William Ellison-Macartney	
11		Sir Henry Lefroy (1854–1930) MLA for Moore 1892–1901 1911–1921	1917	28 June 1917	17 April 1919	1 year, 293 days	Nationalist	Lefroy ministry	George V	William Ellison-Macartney	
12		Sir Hal Colebatch (1872–1953) MLC for East Province 1912–1923 MLC for Metropolitan Province (1940–1948)	—	17 April 1919	17 May 1919	30 days	Nationalist	Colebatch ministry	George V	William Ellison-Macartney	
13		Sir James Mitchell (1866–1951) MLA for Northam 1905–1933	1921	17 May 1919	17 April 1924	4 years, 335 days	Nationalist	First Mitchell ministry	George V	William Ellison-Macartney	
13		Sir James Mitchell (1866–1951) MLA for Northam 1905–1933	1921	17 May 1919	17 April 1924	4 years, 335 days	Nationalist	First Mitchell ministry	George V	Francis Newdegate	
14		Philip Collier (1873–1948) MLA for Boulder 1905–1948	1924; 1927	17 April 1924	24 April 1930	6 years, 8 days	Labor	First Collier ministry	George V	Francis Newdegate	
14		Philip Collier (1873–1948) MLA for Boulder 1905–1948	1924; 1927	17 April 1924	24 April 1930	6 years, 8 days	Labor	First Collier ministry	George V	William Campion	
(13)		Sir James Mitchell (1866–1951) MLA for Northam 1905–1933	1930	24 April 1930	26 April 1933	3 years	Nationalist	Second Mitchell ministry	George V	William Campion	
(13)		Sir James Mitchell (1866–1951) MLA for Northam 1905–1933	1930	24 April 1930	26 April 1933	3 years	Nationalist	Second Mitchell ministry	George V	None	
(14)		Philip Collier (1873–1948) MLA for Boulder 1905–1948	1933; 1936	26 April 1933	19 August 1936	3 years, 118 days	Labor	Second Collier ministry	George V	None	
(14)		Philip Collier (1873–1948) MLA for Boulder 1905–1948	1933; 1936	26 April 1933	19 August 1936	3 years, 118 days	Labor	Second Collier ministry	Edward VIII	None	
15		John Willcock (1879–1947) MLA for Geraldton 1917–1947	1939; 1943	19 August 1936	31 July 1945	8 years, 345 days	Labor	Willcock ministry	Edward VIII	None	
15		John Willcock (1879–1947) MLA for Geraldton 1917–1947	1939; 1943	19 August 1936	31 July 1945	8 years, 345 days	Labor	Willcock ministry	George VI	None	
16		Frank Wise (1897–1986) MLA for Gascoyne 1933–1951	—	31 July 1945	1 April 1947	1 year, 244 days	Labor	Wise ministry	George VI	None	
17		Sir Ross McLarty (1891–1962) MLA for Murray-Wellington 1930–1962	1947; 1950	1 April 1947	23 February 1953	5 years, 328 days	Liberal	McLarty–Watts ministry	George VI	None	
17		Sir Ross McLarty (1891–1962) MLA for Murray-Wellington 1930–1962	1947; 1950	1 April 1947	23 February 1953	5 years, 328 days	Liberal	McLarty–Watts ministry	George VI	James Mitchell	
17		Sir Ross McLarty (1891–1962) MLA for Murray-Wellington 1930–1962	1947; 1950	1 April 1947	23 February 1953	5 years, 328 days	Liberal	McLarty–Watts ministry	George VI	Charles Gairdner	
17		Sir Ross McLarty (1891–1962) MLA for Murray-Wellington 1930–1962	1947; 1950	1 April 1947	23 February 1953	5 years, 328 days	Liberal	McLarty–Watts ministry	Elizabeth II	Charles Gairdner	
18		Bert Hawke (1900–1986) MLA for Northam 1933–1968	1953; 1956	23 February 1953	2 April 1959	6 years, 37 days	Labor	Hawke ministry	Elizabeth II	Charles Gairdner	
19		Sir David Brand (1912–1979) MLA for Greenough 1945–1975	1959; 1962; 1965; 1968	2 April 1959	3 March 1971	11 years, 335 days	Liberal	Brand–Watts ministry	Elizabeth II	Charles Gairdner	
19		Sir David Brand (1912–1979) MLA for Greenough 1945–1975	1959; 1962; 1965; 1968	2 April 1959	3 March 1971	11 years, 335 days	Liberal	Brand–Nalder ministry	Elizabeth II	Charles Gairdner	
19		Sir David Brand (1912–1979) MLA for Greenough 1945–1975	1959; 1962; 1965; 1968	2 April 1959	3 March 1971	11 years, 335 days	Liberal	Brand–Nalder ministry	Elizabeth II	Douglas Kendrew	
20		John Tonkin (1902–1995) MLA for North-East Fremantle 1933–1950 MLA for Melville 1950–1977	1971	3 March 1971	8 April 1974	3 years, 66 days	Labor	Tonkin ministry	Elizabeth II	Douglas Kendrew	
20		John Tonkin (1902–1995) MLA for North-East Fremantle 1933–1950 MLA for Melville 1950–1977	1971	3 March 1971	8 April 1974	3 years, 66 days	Labor	Tonkin ministry	Elizabeth II	Hughie Edwards	
21		Sir Charles Court (1911–2007) MLA for Nedlands 1953–1982	1974; 1977; 1980	8 April 1974	25 January 1982	7 years, 292 days	Liberal	Court–McPharlin ministry	Elizabeth II	Hughie Edwards	
21		Sir Charles Court (1911–2007) MLA for Nedlands 1953–1982	1974; 1977; 1980	8 April 1974	25 January 1982	7 years, 292 days	Liberal	Court ministry	Elizabeth II	Hughie Edwards	
21		Sir Charles Court (1911–2007) MLA for Nedlands 1953–1982	1974; 1977; 1980	8 April 1974	25 January 1982	7 years, 292 days	Liberal	Court ministry	Elizabeth II	Wallace Kyle	
21		Sir Charles Court (1911–2007) MLA for Nedlands 1953–1982	1974; 1977; 1980	8 April 1974	25 January 1982	7 years, 292 days	Liberal	Court ministry	Elizabeth II	Richard Trowbridge	
22		Ray O'Connor (1926–2013) MLA for North Perth 1959–1962 MLA for Mount Lawley 1962–1984	—	25 January 1982	25 February 1983	1 year, 31 days	Liberal	O'Connor ministry	Elizabeth II	Richard Trowbridge	
23		Brian Burke (born 1947) MLA for Balcatta 1973–1974 1977–1983 MLA for Balga 1974–1977 1983–1988	1983; 1986	25 February 1983	25 February 1988	5 years	Labor	Burke ministry	Elizabeth II	Richard Trowbridge	
23		Brian Burke (born 1947) MLA for Balcatta 1973–1974 1977–1983 MLA for Balga 1974–1977 1983–1988	1983; 1986	25 February 1983	25 February 1988	5 years	Labor	Burke ministry	Elizabeth II	Gordon Reid	
24		Peter Dowding (born 1943) MLC for North Province 1979–1986 MLA for Maylands 1986–1990	1989	25 February 1988	12 February 1990	1 year, 352 days	Labor	Dowding ministry	Elizabeth II	Gordon Reid	
24		Peter Dowding (born 1943) MLC for North Province 1979–1986 MLA for Maylands 1986–1990	1989	25 February 1988	12 February 1990	1 year, 352 days	Labor	Dowding ministry	Elizabeth II	None	
25		Carmen Lawrence (born 1948) MLA for Subiaco 1986–1989 MLA for Glendalough 1989–1994	—	12 February 1990	16 February 1993	3 years, 4 days	Labor	Lawrence ministry	Elizabeth II	None	
25		Carmen Lawrence (born 1948) MLA for Subiaco 1986–1989 MLA for Glendalough 1989–1994	—	12 February 1990	16 February 1993	3 years, 4 days	Labor	Lawrence ministry	Elizabeth II	Francis Burt	
26		Richard Court (born 1947) MLA for Nedlands 1982–2001	1993; 1996	16 February 1993	16 February 2001	7 years, 360 days	Liberal	Court–Cowan ministry	Elizabeth II	Francis Burt	
26		Richard Court (born 1947) MLA for Nedlands 1982–2001	1993; 1996	16 February 1993	16 February 2001	7 years, 360 days	Liberal	Court–Cowan ministry	Elizabeth II	Michael Jeffery	
26		Richard Court (born 1947) MLA for Nedlands 1982–2001	1993; 1996	16 February 1993	16 February 2001	7 years, 360 days	Liberal	Court–Cowan ministry	Elizabeth II	John Sanderson	
27		Geoff Gallop (born 1951) MLA for Victoria Park 1986–2006	2001; 2005	16 February 2001	25 January 2006	4 years, 343 days	Labor	Gallop ministry	Elizabeth II	John Sanderson	
27		Geoff Gallop (born 1951) MLA for Victoria Park 1986–2006	2001; 2005	16 February 2001	25 January 2006	4 years, 343 days	Labor	Gallop ministry	Elizabeth II	Ken Michael	
28		Alan Carpenter (born 1951) MLA for Willagee 1996–2009	—	25 January 2006	23 September 2008	2 years, 242 days	Labor	Carpenter ministry	Elizabeth II	Ken Michael	
29		Colin Barnett (born 1950) MLA for Cottesloe 1990 – 2018	2008; 2013	23 September 2008	17 March 2017	8 years, 175 days	Liberal	Barnett ministry	Elizabeth II	Ken Michael	
29		Colin Barnett (born 1950) MLA for Cottesloe 1990 – 2018	2008; 2013	23 September 2008	17 March 2017	8 years, 175 days	Liberal	Barnett ministry	Elizabeth II	Malcolm McCusker	
29		Colin Barnett (born 1950) MLA for Cottesloe 1990 – 2018	2008; 2013	23 September 2008	17 March 2017	8 years, 175 days	Liberal	Barnett ministry	Elizabeth II	Kerry Sanderson	
30		Mark McGowan (born 1967) MLA for Rockingham 1996–2023	2017; 2021	17 March 2017	8 June 2023	6 years, 83 days	Labor	First McGowan ministry	Elizabeth II	Kerry Sanderson	
30		Mark McGowan (born 1967) MLA for Rockingham 1996–2023	2017; 2021	17 March 2017	8 June 2023	6 years, 83 days	Labor	First McGowan ministry	Elizabeth II	Kim Beazley	
30		Mark McGowan (born 1967) MLA for Rockingham 1996–2023	2017; 2021	17 March 2017	8 June 2023	6 years, 83 days	Labor	Second McGowan ministry	Elizabeth II	Kim Beazley	
30		Mark McGowan (born 1967) MLA for Rockingham 1996–2023	2017; 2021	17 March 2017	8 June 2023	6 years, 83 days	Labor	Second McGowan ministry	Elizabeth II	Chris Dawson	
30		Mark McGowan (born 1967) MLA for Rockingham 1996–2023	2017; 2021	17 March 2017	8 June 2023	6 years, 83 days	Labor	Second McGowan ministry	Charles III	Chris Dawson	
31		Roger Cook (born 1965) MLA for Kwinana 2008–present	2025	8 June 2023	incumbent	3 years, 94 days	Labor	Cook ministry	Charles III	Chris Dawson	

== Bibliography ==
- Black, David (2021). The Western Australian Parliamentary Handbook (PDF) (25th ed.). Parliament of Western Australia. ISBN 978-1-925580-43-3. Archived (PDF) from the original on 13 March 2023.
- Reid, G.S.; Oliver, M.R. (1982). The premiers of Western Australia, 1890-1982. University of Western Australia Press. ISBN 978-0-85564-214-3.
