= Dumas House =

Government office building in Perth, Western Australia

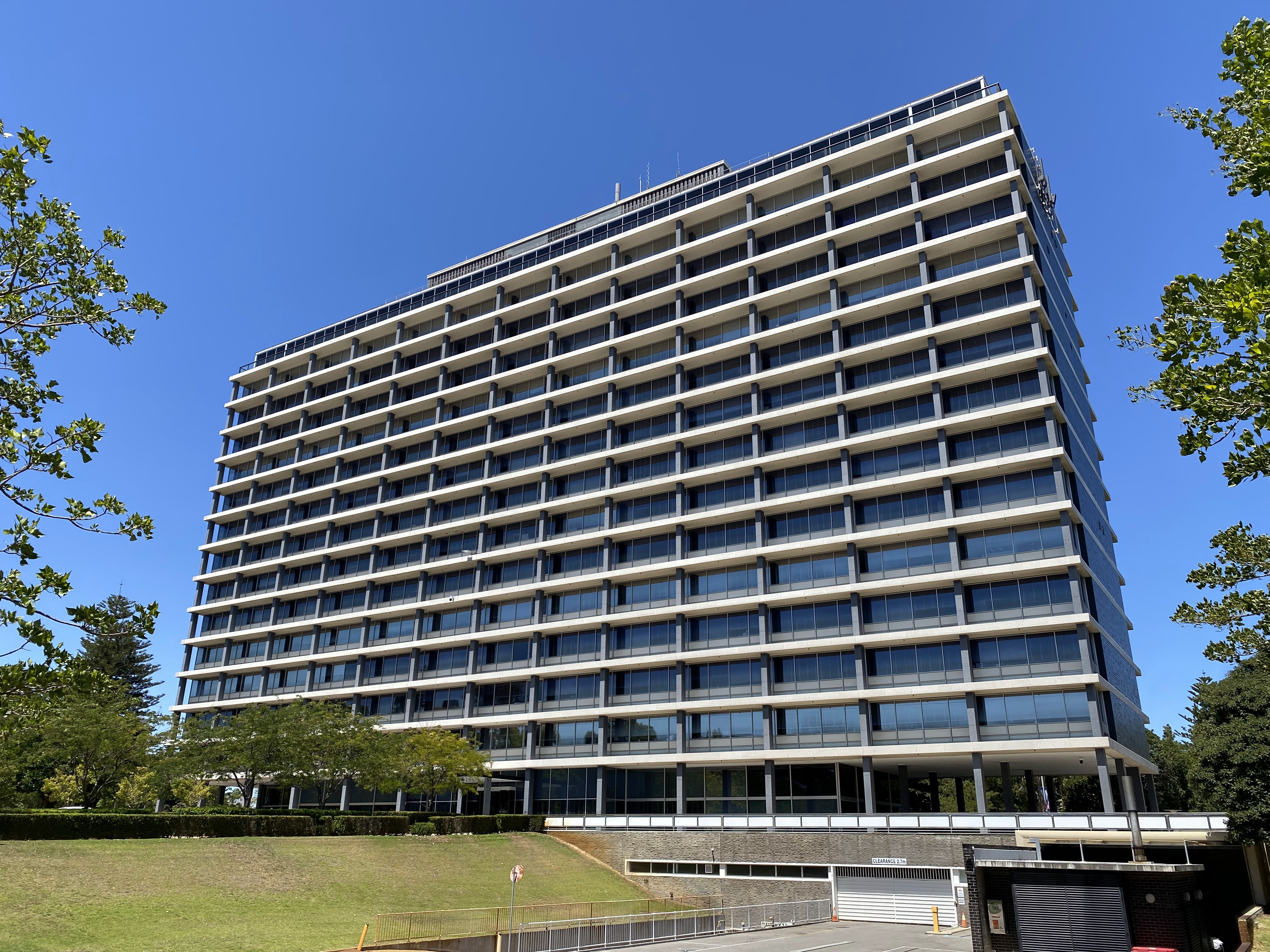
- Dumas House
- Interactive map of the Dumas House area

General information
- Type: Government office
- Location: Perth, Western Australia
- Coordinates: 31°57′11″S 115°50′37″E

Western Australia Heritage Register
- Type: State Registered Place
- Designated: 8 August 2000
- Reference no.: 3849

Dumas House is a fourteen-storey office building constructed in Perth, Western Australia, during the 1960s. The building is located close to St Georges Terrace, Kings Park, and Parliament House.

== Background ==
Dumas House was part of the 1955 plan to centralise all Western Australian Government departments near the Parliament House, based on the Stephenson-Hepburn Report. Several such plans had been proposed since the late 1920s, but post-World War II state finances and resources were unable to support the proposals. Public Works Department architects G. Finn, E. Van Mens and P. Maidment won a national competition to design the five office buildings that would house the departments. Dumas House was completed in 1965, and was the only building constructed on the site out of the five planned.

Originally called Government Building, Dumas House was opened by Premier David Brand on 4 March 1966. Brand's speech at the opening focused on the building's importance to the state:

It is a big building, and I think a handsome one. But this is not the important point at today's ceremony. As I see it, this building is important not only because it provides essential office accommodation of a good standard essential for workers but because it is a symbol of a great era of progress for Western Australia. It is one of the signs of the beginning of a new age of development - aided by science, aided by an unprecedented inflow of capital funds, aided by great enthusiasm for the harnessing of our enormous resources and spurred on by the enterprise of thousands of people, partnerships, groups and companies from one end of the State to the other. I believe history will look back on the 'sixties as one of the landmarks in the story of our state.

In 1968, the state government scrapped its plans for five office buildings on the site for two reasons: increased traffic caused by the first building was such that the traffic for five buildings would have been unbearable, and politicians believed that five buildings on such a prominent site would give the appearance of "dominance by the bureaucracy - a 'big brother' complex".

The building was named Dumas House in February 1978 in honour of Russell Dumas, who was the Director of Works and Buildings for the Public Works Department between 1941 and 1953.

Dumas House is an example of the post-war International Style of architecture, with a modular grid building plan, glazed panelling and an open piazza. The International style was adapted for Australian conditions by adding horizontal slabs that project from the sides of the building and provide shade. The building's construction, including fittings, cost A$4.9 million, equivalent to A$72.3 million in 2022.

The building is owned by the Department of Housing and Works of the Government of Western Australia.

In 1985, consideration was given to the presence of asbestos in the construction of the building. Extensive refurbishment of the building's interior was undertaken in 2012, and façade restoration works in 2015–2018.

The Perth weather radar was once housed on its roof.

== Appraisal ==
British businessman and property developer Alistair McAlpine (1942–2014), active in Perth in the 1960s, recalled in his memoir:

Parliament intended to sit with the bureaucracy in new office towers at its back. Happily, only one of five hard-faced, multi-storeyed office blocks to house civil servants was ever built. On seeing thes first of their monoliths, some intelligent politician must have realised that civil servants, a prolific but generally unpopular species in Australia, would not enhance the popularity of politicians with so dominant a presence.
