= 1904 Western Australian state election =

- 28 June 1904

All 50 seats in the Western Australian Legislative Assembly
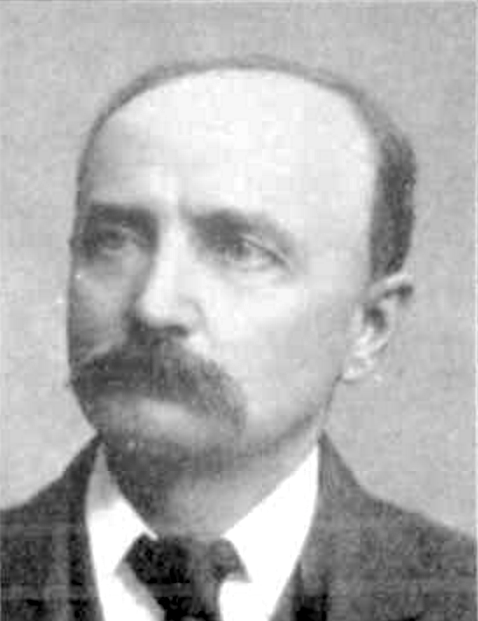

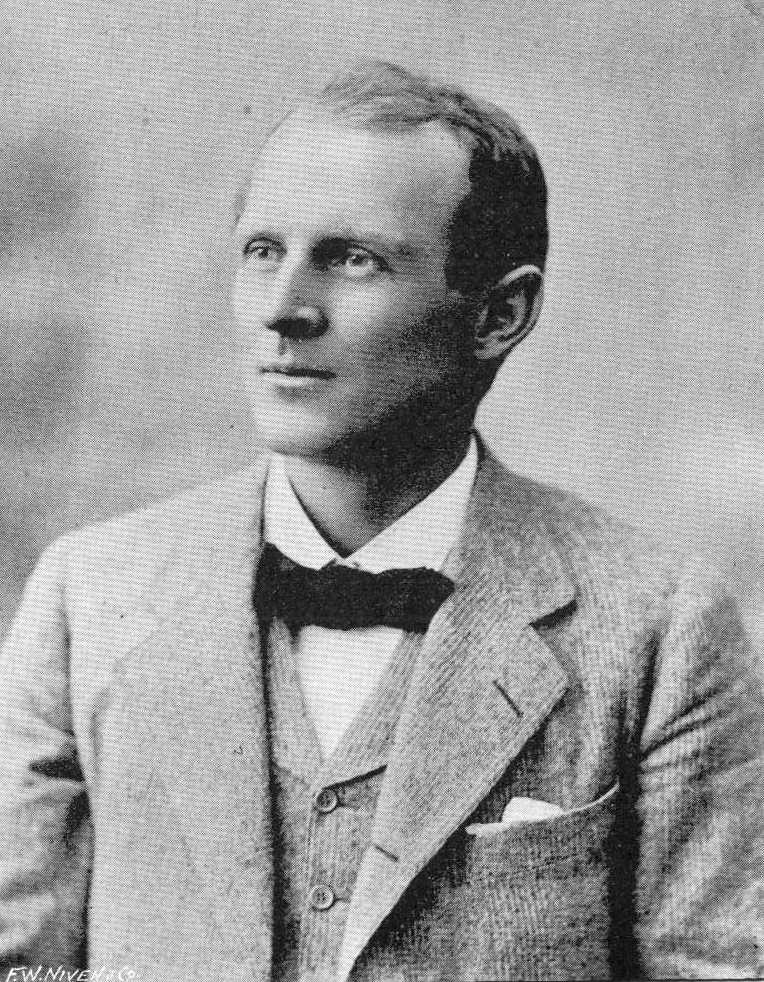
	First party	Second party
Leader	Robert Hastie	Walter James
Party	Labor	Ministerialist
Leader since	10 May 1901	1 July 1902
Leader's seat	Kanowna	East Perth
Last election	6 seats	19 seats
Seats won	22 seats	18 seats
Seat change	▲16	▼1
Percentage	42.57%	36.69%
Swing	▲16.70	▲16.46
Premier before election
Walter James
Ministerialist
Elected Premier
Walter James
Ministerialist

Elections were held in the Australian state of Western Australia on 28 June 1904 to elect 50 members to the state's Legislative Assembly.

The election resulted in a hung parliament. The Labour Party, led by Robert Hastie, won 22 seats, while the governing Ministerialists won 18 seats, and independents won 10 seats. Walter James, who had been premier since July 1902, initially continued on in the role after the election. The Labour Party elected a new leader, Henry Daglish, on 8 July. Daglish successfully moved a motion of no confidence on 9 August, and after James's resignation became premier on 10 August. He was Western Australia's first premier from the Labour Party.

== Results ==
Western Australian state election, 1904 Legislative Assembly
Enrolled voters	163,826^{[1]}				
Votes cast	66,054		Turnout	48.28%	
Informal votes	731		Informal	1.09%	
Summary of votes by party
Party	Primary votes	%	Swing	Seats	Change
Labour	28,122	42.57%	+16.70	22	+16
Ministerialist	24,234	36.69%	+16.46	18	–1
Independent	12,810	19.39%	+5.99	10	+5
Independent Labour	888	1.34%	+1.34	0	±0
Total	66,054			50	

== See also ==
- Members of the Western Australian Legislative Assembly, 1901–1904
- Members of the Western Australian Legislative Assembly, 1904–1905

== Notes ==
^{1} The total number of enrolled voters was 163,826, of whom 25,511 were registered in ten uncontested seats. Five of the uncontested seats were won by Labour, three by Ministerialists, and two by independents.
