= Minister for Water (Western Australia) =

Position within the Western Australian government

Minister for Water is a position in the government of Western Australia, currently held by Simone McGurk of the Labor Party. The position was first created in 1913, for the government of John Scaddan, and has existed in almost every government since then. The minister is responsible for the state government's Department of Water, which manage water resources in Western Australia. Until the 1930s, the responsibilities now held by the Minister for Water were often shared by two ministers, each with a different title.

== Titles ==
- 16 January 1913 – 27 July 1916 (two ministers): Minister for Water Supply and Minister for Sewerage and Drainage
- 27 July 1916 – 28 June 1917: Minister for Water Supply
- 28 June 1917 – 15 April 1924 (two ministers): Minister for Water Supply and Minister for Sewerage and Drainage
- 15 April 1924 – 15 December 1927: Minister for Water Supply
- 15 December 1927 – 23 April 1930 (two ministers): Minister for Metropolitan Water Supply and Minister for Goldfields and Agricultural Water Supplies
- 24 April 1930 – 24 April 1933 (two ministers): Minister for Metropolitan Water Supply and Minister for Country Water Supplies
- 24 April 1933 – 1 April 1947: Minister for Water Supplies
- 1 April 1947 – 23 February 1953: Minister for Water Supply
- 23 February 1953 – 5 March 1980: Minister for Water Supplies
- 5 March 1980 – 23 September 2008: Minister for Water Resources
- 23 September 2008 – present: Minister for Water

== List of ministers ==
Term start	Term end	Minister(s)	Party
16 January 1913	23 November 1914	William Johnson	Labor
23 November 1914	27 July 1916	Philip Collier	Labor
27 July 1916	28 June 1917	James Mitchell	Liberal
28 June 1917	15 April 1924	William George	Nationalist
15 April 1924	15 December 1927	Alick McCallum	Labor
15 December 1927	23 April 1930	Alick McCallum (Metropolitan)	Labor
15 December 1927	23 April 1930	James Cunningham (Agricultural and Goldfields)	Labor
24 April 1930	24 April 1933	John Lindsay (Metropolitan)	Country
24 April 1930	24 April 1933	Charles Baxter (Country)	Country
24 April 1933	16 March 1935	Alick McCallum (again)	Labor
26 March 1935	9 December 1943	Harold Millington	Labor
9 December 1943	1 April 1947	Albert Hawke	Labor
1 April 1947	6 April 1950	Victor Doney	Country
6 April 1950	23 February 1953	David Brand	Liberal
23 February 1953	2 April 1959	John Tonkin	Labor
2 April 1959	16 March 1965	Gerald Wild	Liberal
16 March 1965	3 March 1971	Ross Hutchinson	Liberal
3 March 1971	8 April 1974	Colin Jamieson	Labor
8 April 1974	10 March 1977	Des O'Neil	Liberal
10 March 1977	25 August 1978	Ray O'Connor	Liberal
25 August 1978	5 March 1980	Graham MacKinnon	Liberal
5 March 1980	25 February 1983	Andrew Mensaros	Liberal
25 February 1983	12 May 1986	Arthur Tonkin	Labor
12 May 1986	25 July 1986	Des Dans	Labor
25 July 1986	16 February 1993	Ernie Bridge	Labor
16 February 1993	10 February 1995	Paul Omodei	Liberal
10 February 1995	21 December 1995	Peter Foss	Liberal
21 December 1995	9 January 1997	Roger Nicholls	Liberal
9 January 1997	16 February 2001	Kim Hames	Liberal
16 February 2001	1 July 2001	Judy Edwards	Labor
2001–2005: no minister – responsibilities held by the Minister for the Environment
10 March 2005	25 January 2006	Geoff Gallop	Labor
25 January 2006	3 February 2006	Alan Carpenter	Labor
3 February 2006	23 September 2008	John Kobelke	Labor
23 September 2008	14 December 2010	Graham Jacobs	Liberal
14 December 2010	21 March 2013	Bill Marmion	Liberal
21 March 2013	11 December 2013	Terry Redman	National
11 December 2013	17 March 2017	Mia Davies	National
17 March 2017	14 December 2022	Dave Kelly	Labor
14 December 2022	incumbent	Simone McGurk	Labor

== See also ==
- Minister for the Environment and Water (Australia)
  - Minister for Water (Victoria)
  - Minister for Water (New South Wales)
- Minister for the Environment (Western Australia)
- Minister for Fisheries (Western Australia)
- Minister for Lands (Western Australia)
