= 1905 Western Australian state election =

State election in Western Australia in 1905

- 27 October – 13 November 1905

All 50 seats in the Western Australian Legislative Assembly
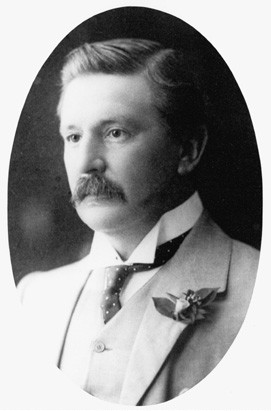

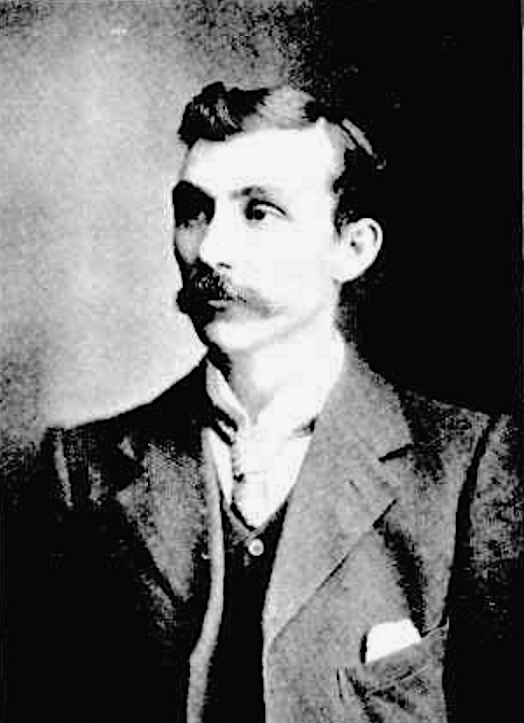
	First party	Second party
Leader	Hector Rason	William Johnson
Party	Ministerialist	Labor
Leader since	28 September 1904	4 October 1905
Leader's seat	Guildford	Kalgoorlie (lost seat)
Last election	18 seats	22 seats
Seats won	33 seats	14 seats
Seat change	▲15	▼8
Percentage	53.84	35.07%
Swing	▲17.15	▼7.50
Premier before election
Hector Rason
Ministerialist
Elected Premier
Hector Rason
Ministerialist

Elections were held in the Australian state of Western Australia in late 1905 to elect 50 members to the state's Legislative Assembly. The main polling day was 27 October, although four remote electorates (Dundas, Gascoyne, Kimberley, and Pilbara) went to the polls on 13 November.

Hector Rason, the sitting premier and a member of the Ministerialist faction, had taken office on 25 August 1905 at the head of a minority government, following the fall of the previous minority government led by Henry Daglish of the Labour Party. Daglish resigned as party leader on 27 September, and was replaced by William Johnson on 4 October. At the election, Rason and the Ministerialists recorded a landslide victory, with their gain of 15 seats allowing them to form a comfortable majority government. Eight Labour members lost their seats, including their leader Johnson, who was defeated in Kalgoorlie by Norbert Keenan.

== Results ==
Western Australian state election, 1905 Legislative Assembly
Enrolled voters	121,722^{[1]}				
Votes cast	52,896		Turnout	51.86%	
Informal votes	535		Informal	1.01%	
Summary of votes by party
Party	Primary votes	%	Swing	Seats	Change
Ministerialist	28,189	53.84%	+17.15	33	+15
Labour	18,364	35.07%	–7.50	14	–8
Independent Labour	2,161	4.13%	+2.78	1	+1
Ind. Ministerialist	1,943	3.71%	+3.71	2	+2
Independent	1,704	3.25%	–16.14	0	–10
Total	52,361			50	

== See also ==
- Members of the Western Australian Legislative Assembly, 1904–1905
- Members of the Western Australian Legislative Assembly, 1905–1908

== Notes ==
^{1} The total number of enrolled voters was 121,722, of whom 19,720 were registered in 11 uncontested seats. Eight of the uncontested seats were won by Ministerialists and three by Labour.
