= Treasurer of Western Australia =

Title held by a Cabinet Minister

- Western Australian coat of arms

- Flag of Western Australia
- Incumbent; Rita Saffioti since 8 June 2023
- Department of Treasury
- Style: The Honourable
- Member of: Parliament; Cabinet; Executive Council
- Reports to: Premier of Western Australia
- Seat: Dumas House, Perth
- Nominator: Premier of Western Australia
- Appointer: Governor of Western Australia on the advice of the premier
- Term length: At the governor's pleasure
- Formation: 29 January 1890
- First holder: Sir John Forrest

Treasurer of Western Australia is the title held by the Cabinet minister who is responsible for the management of Western Australia's public sector finances, and for preparing and delivering the annual state budget. With only rare exceptions, until 2001, the position of treasurer was usually held by the premier of Western Australia.

Up until the government of Philip Collier in 1924, the position was called Colonial Treasurer.

== List of treasurers of Western Australia ==
Treasurer	Party	Assumed office	Left office	Term
William Henry Drake	(none)	1838	1848	10 years
Anthony O'Grady Lefroy	none	1856	December 1890	34 years, 181 days
Sir John Forrest	(pro-Forrest)^{1}	29 December 1890	15 February 1901	10 years, 48 days
George Throssell	(pro-Forrest)^{1}	15 February 1901	27 May 1901	101 days
Frederick Illingworth	Opposition^{1}	27 May 1901	21 November 1901	178 days
Alf Morgans	Ministerialist^{1}	21 November 1901	23 December 1901	32 days
Frederick Illingworth	Opposition^{1}	23 December 1901	1 July 1902	190 days
James Gardiner	Opposition^{1}	1 July 1902	20 April 1904	1 year, 294 days
Cornthwaite Rason	Opposition^{1}	20 April 1904	10 August 1904	112 days
Henry Daglish	Labor	10 August 1904	25 August 1905	1 year, 15 days
Hector Rason	Ministerialist	25 August 1905	7 May 1906	255 days
Frank Wilson	Ministerialist	7 May 1906	30 June 1909	3 years, 54 days
Sir Newton Moore	Ministerialist	30 June 1909	16 September 1910	1 year, 78 days
Frank Wilson	Ministerialist	16 September 1910	7 October 1911	1 year, 21 days
John Scaddan	Labor	7 October 1911	27 July 1916	4 years, 294 days
Frank Wilson	Liberal (WA)	27 July 1916	28 June 1917	336 days
James Gardiner	Country	28 June 1917	2 April 1919	1 year, 278 days
Sir Henry Lefroy	Nationalist	2 April 1919	17 April 1919	15 days
Sir Hal Colebatch	Nationalist	17 April 1919	17 May 1919	30 days
Sir James Mitchell	Nationalist	17 May 1919	16 April 1924	4 years, 335 days
Philip Collier	Labor	16 April 1924	24 April 1930	6 years, 8 days
Sir James Mitchell	Nationalist	24 April 1930	24 April 1933	3 years, 0 days
Philip Collier	Labor	24 April 1933	20 August 1936	3 years, 118 days
John Willcock	Labor	20 August 1936	31 July 1945	8 years, 345 days
Frank Wise	Labor	31 July 1945	1 April 1947	1 year, 244 days
Sir Ross McLarty	Liberal	1 April 1947	23 February 1953	5 years, 328 days
Albert Hawke	Labor	23 February 1953	2 April 1959	6 years, 38 days
Sir David Brand	Liberal	2 April 1959	3 March 1971	11 years, 335 days
Tom Evans	Labor	3 March 1971	12 October 1971	223 days
John Tonkin	Labor	12 October 1971	8 April 1974	2 years, 178 days
Sir Charles Court	Liberal	8 April 1974	25 January 1982	7 years, 292 days
Ray O'Connor	Liberal	25 January 1982	19 February 1983	1 year, 25 days
Brian Burke	Labor	19 February 1983	25 February 1988	5 years, 6 days
Peter Dowding	Labor	25 February 1988	12 February 1990	1 year, 352 days
Carmen Lawrence	Labor	12 February 1990	16 February 1993	3 years, 4 days
Richard Court	Liberal	16 February 1993	10 February 2001	7 years, 360 days
Eric Ripper	Labor	16 February 2001	23 September 2008	7 years, 220 days
Troy Buswell	Liberal	23 September 2008	27 April 2010	1 year, 216 days
Colin Barnett	Liberal	27 April 2010	14 December 2010	231 days
Christian Porter	Liberal	14 December 2010	12 June 2012	1 year, 181 days
Colin Barnett	Liberal	12 June 2012	7 July 2012	25 days
Troy Buswell	Liberal	7 July 2012	10 March 2014	1 year, 246 days
Colin Barnett	Liberal	10 March 2014	17 March 2014	7 days
Mike Nahan	Liberal	17 March 2014	17 March 2017	3 years, 0 days
Ben Wyatt	Labor	17 March 2017	18 March 2021	4 years, 1 day
Mark McGowan	Labor	18 March 2021	8 June 2023	2 years, 82 days
Rita Saffioti	Labor	8 June 2023	present	3 years, 92 days
