= Minister for Commerce (Western Australia) =

Minister for Commerce and Industrial Relations is a position in the government of Western Australia, currently held by Sue Ellery of the Labor Party. The position was first created after the 1993 state election, for the government of Richard Court. The minister is responsible for the state government's Department of Commerce.

The current Minister for Commerce and Industrial Relations holds responsibilities that were previously given to several separate ministers – the Minister for Works (abolished 2001), Minister for Labour (abolished 2001), and Minister for Consumer Affairs (abolished 2008).

== List of commerce ministers ==
Titles

- 16 February 1993 – 16 February 2001: Minister for Commerce and Trade
- 23 September 2008 – 17 March 2017: Minister for Commerce
- 17 March 2017 – unknown: Minister for Commerce and Industrial Relations
- Unknown – present: Minister for Commerce

Term start	Term end	Minister(s)	Party
16 February 1993	16 February 2001	Hendy Cowan	National
2001–2008: no separate minister – responsibilities held by other ministers
23 September 2008	28 April 2010	Troy Buswell	Liberal
28 April 2010	14 December 2010	Bill Marmion	Liberal
14 December 2010	21 March 2013	Simon O'Brien	Liberal
21 March 2013	17 March 2017	Michael Mischin	Liberal
17 March 2017	18 December 2018	Bill Johnston	Labor
18 December 2018	18 March 2021	John Quigley	Labor
18 March 2021	17 December 2021	Amber-Jade Sanderson	Labor
21 December 2021	14 December 2022	Roger Cook	Labor
14 December 2022		Sue Ellery	Labor

== List of works ministers ==
Titles

- 29 December 1890 – 27 May 1901: Director of Public Works
- 27 May 1901 – 16 April 1924: Minister for Works
- 16 April 1924 – 20 August 1936: Minister for Public Works
- 20 August 1936 – 25 February 1986: Minister for Works
- 25 February 1986 – 5 February 1991: Minister for Works and Services
- 5 February 1991 – 16 February 1993: Minister for Construction
- 16 February 1993 – 1 July 2001: Minister for Works

Term start	Term end	Minister(s)	Party
29 December 1890	10 March 1896	Harry Venn	Ministerial
1 April 1896	23 August 1900	Frederick Piesse	Ministerial
10 September 1900	27 May 1901	Barrington Wood	Ministerial
27 May 1901	21 November 1901	Walter Kingsmill	Ministerial
21 November 1901	23 December 1901	Timothy Quinlan	Ministerial
23 December 1901	28 April 1904	Hector Rason	Ministerial
28 April 1904	10 August 1904	John Nanson	Ministerial
10 August 1904	7 June 1905	William Johnson	Labor
7 June 1905	25 August 1905	Patrick Lynch	Labor
25 August 1905	7 May 1906	Frank Wilson	Ministerial
7 May 1906	30 June 1909	James Price	Ministerial
30 June 1909	16 September 1910	Frank Wilson (again)	Ministerial
16 September 1910	3 October 1911	Henry Daglish	Ministerial
17 October 1911	23 November 1914	William Johnson (again)	Labor
23 November 1914	27 July 1916	William Angwin	Labor
27 July 1916	15 April 1924	William George	Liberal / Nationalist
16 April 1924	23 April 1930	Alick McCallum	Labor
24 April 1930	24 April 1933	John Lindsay	Country
24 April 1933	16 March 1935	Alick McCallum (again)	Labor
16 March 1935	13 May 1936	James Kenneally	Labor
15 July 1936	9 December 1943	Harold Millington	Labor
9 December 1943	1 April 1947	Albert Hawke	Labor
1 April 1947	6 April 1950	Victor Doney	Country
6 April 1950	23 February 1953	David Brand	Liberal
23 February 1953	2 April 1959	John Tonkin	Labor
2 April 1959	16 March 1965	Gerald Wild	Liberal
16 March 1965	3 March 1971	Ross Hutchinson	Liberal
3 March 1971	8 April 1974	Colin Jamieson	Labor
8 April 1974	10 March 1977	Des O'Neil	Liberal
10 March 1977	25 August 1978	Ray O'Connor	Liberal
25 August 1978	5 March 1980	Graham MacKinnon	Liberal
5 March 1980	25 February 1983	Andrew Mensaros	Liberal
25 February 1983	25 February 1986	Ken McIver	Labor
25 February 1986	16 March 1987	Des Dans	Labor
16 March 1987	25 February 1988	Peter Dowding	Labor
25 February 1988	28 February 1989	Gavan Troy	Labor
28 February 1989	19 February 1990	Yvonne Henderson	Labor
19 February 1990	5 February 1991	Pam Buchanan	Labor
5 February 1991	16 February 1993	Pam Buchanan	Labor
16 February 1993	10 February 1995	Graham Kierath	Liberal
10 February 1995	9 January 1997	Kevin Minson	Liberal
9 January 1997	22 December 1999	Mike Board	Liberal
22 December 1999	16 February 2001	Rob Johnson	Liberal
16 February 2001	1 July 2001	Tom Stephens	Labor

== List of labour ministers ==
Titles

- 10 August 1904 – 25 August 1905: Minister for Labour
- 25 August 1905 – 16 September 1910: Minister for Commerce and Labour
- 16 April 1924 – 8 April 1974: Minister for Labour
- 8 April 1974 – 25 February 1983: Minister for Labour and Industry
- 25 February 1983 – 16 March 1987: Minister for Industrial Relations
- 16 March 1987 – 19 February 1990: Minister for Labour
- 19 February 1990 – 16 February 1993: Minister for Productivity and Labour Relations
- 16 February 1993 – 1 July 2001: Minister for Labour Relations

Term start	Term end	Minister(s)	Party
10 August 1904	7 June 1905	John Holman	Labor
7 June 1905	25 August 1905	Robert Hastie	Labor
25 August 1905	7 May 1906	John Hicks	Ministerial
7 May 1906	16 September 1910	James Connolly	Ministerial
1910–1924: no separate minister – responsibilities held by other ministers
16 April 1924	23 April 1930	Alick McCallum	Labor
24 April 1930	24 April 1933	John Lindsay	Country
24 April 1933	16 March 1935	Alick McCallum (again)	Labor
16 March 1935	13 May 1936	James Kenneally	Labor
15 July 1936	9 December 1943	Albert Hawke	Labor
1943–1945: no separate minister – responsibilities held by other ministers
3 August 1945	1 April 1947	Alexander Panton	Labor
1 April 1947	23 February 1953	Lindsay Thorn	Country
23 February 1953	2 April 1959	Bill Hegney	Labor
2 April 1959	7 November 1961	Charles Perkins	Country
16 November 1961	11 April 1962	Stewart Bovell	Liberal
12 April 1962	16 March 1965	Gerald Wild	Liberal
16 March 1965	3 March 1971	Des O'Neil	Liberal
3 March 1971	30 May 1973	Don Taylor	Labor
30 May 1973	8 April 1974	John Harman	Labor
8 April 1974	21 July 1978	Bill Grayden	Liberal
7 August 1978	25 January 1982	Ray O'Connor	Liberal
25 January 1982	25 February 1983	Gordon Masters	Liberal
25 February 1983	20 December 1984	Des Dans	Labor
20 December 1984	25 February 1988	Peter Dowding	Labor
25 February 1988	5 February 1991	Gavan Troy	Labor
5 February 1991	16 February 1993	Yvonne Henderson	Labor
16 February 1993	28 July 1998	Graham Kierath	Liberal
28 July 1998	16 February 2001	Cheryl Edwardes	Liberal
16 February 2001	1 July 2001	John Kobelke	Labor

== List of consumer affairs ministers ==
Titles

- 7 October 1949 – 13 May 1954: Minister for Prices
- 3 March 1971 – 8 April 1974: Minister for Prices Control and Minister for Consumer Protection (two titles)
- 8 April 1974 – 3 November 1993: Minister for Consumer Affairs
- 3 November 1993 – 16 February 2001: Minister for Fair Trading
- 16 February 2001 – 1 July 2001: Minister for Consumer Affairs
- 1 July 2001 – 3 February 2006: Minister for Consumer and Employment Protection
- 3 February 2006 – 23 September 2008: Minister for Consumer Protection

Term start	Term end	Minister(s)	Party
7 October 1949	6 April 1950	Arthur Abbott	Liberal
1950–1953: no separate minister – responsibilities held by other ministers
23 February 1953	13 May 1954	Bill Hegney	Labor
1954–1971: no separate minister – responsibilities held by other ministers
3 March 1971	12 October 1971	Ron Davies	Labor
12 October 1971	30 May 1973	Don Taylor	Labor
30 May 1973	8 April 1974	John Harman	Labor
8 April 1974	21 July 1978	Bill Grayden	Liberal
7 August 1978	25 January 1982	Ray O'Connor	Liberal
25 August 1978	5 March 1980	Graham MacKinnon	Liberal
25 January 1982	14 May 1982	Ray Young	Liberal
14 May 1982	25 February 1983	Richard Shalders	Liberal
25 February 1983	23 December 1983	Arthur Tonkin	Labor
23 December 1983	25 February 1986	Peter Dowding	Labor
25 February 1986	16 March 1987	Keith Wilson	Labor
16 March 1987	25 February 1988	Ian Taylor	Labor
25 February 1988	28 February 1989	Graham Edwards	Labor
28 February 1989	16 February 1993	Yvonne Henderson	Labor
16 February 1993	21 December 1995	Peter Foss	Liberal
21 December 1995	9 January 1997	Cheryl Edwardes	Liberal
9 January 1997	16 February 2001	Doug Shave	Liberal
16 February 2001	3 February 2006	John Kobelke	Labor
3 February 2006	13 December 2006	Michelle Roberts	Labor
13 December 2006	23 September 2008	Sheila McHale	Labor

== See also ==
- Treasurer of Western Australia
- Minister for Finance (Western Australia)
- Minister for Housing (Western Australia)
- Minister for Small Business (Western Australia)
- Minister for State Development (Western Australia)
