= Ministry (collective executive) =

Collective body of government ministers

In constitutional usage in Commonwealth realms, a ministry (usually preceded by the definite article, i.e., the ministry) is a collective body of government ministers led by a head of government, such as a prime minister. Although the term "cabinet" can in some circumstances be a synonym, a ministry can be a broader concept which might include office-holders who do not participate in cabinet meetings. Other titles can include "administration" (in the United States) or "government" (in common usage among most parliamentary systems) to describe similar collectives.

The term is primarily used to describe the successive governments of the United Kingdom, India, Canada, Australia and New Zealand, which share a common political heritage. In Australia, a new ministry begins after each election, regardless of whether the prime minister is re-elected, and whether there may have been a minor rearrangement of the ministry. In the United Kingdom, Canada and New Zealand, a new ministry is formed only when there is a change of prime minister.

== See also ==
- List of Australian ministries
- List of British governments
- List of Canadian ministries
- List of Indian union ministries
- List of New Zealand governments
- List of Scottish governments
- List of Northern Ireland Executives
- List of Welsh Governments
