= Electoral results for the district of Perth =

Western Australian district election results

This is a list of results for the electoral district of Perth in Western Australian state elections from the district's creation in 1890 until the present.

== Members for Perth ==
Perth (1890–1950)
Member	Party	Term
Edward Scott	Non-aligned	1890–1892
Thomas Molloy	Non-aligned	1892–1894
George Randell	Oppositionist	1894–1897
Lyall Hall	Ministerialist	1897–1901
Frank Wilson	Ministerialist	1901
William Purkiss	Oppositionist	1901–1904
Harry Brown	Ministerialist	1904–1911
Sir Walter Dwyer	Labor	1911–1914
Sir James Connolly	Liberal	1914–1917
Robert Pilkington	Nationalist	1917–1921
Harry Mann	Nationalist	1921–1933
Ted Needham	Labor	1933–1950
Perth (1961–present)
Member	Party	Term
Stanley Heal	Labor	1962–1965
Peter Durack	Liberal	1965–1968
Terry Burke	Labor	1968–1987
Dr Ian Alexander	Labor	1987–1991
Dr Ian Alexander	Independent	1991–1993
Diana Warnock	Labor	1993–2001
John Hyde	Labor	2001–2013
Eleni Evangel	Liberal	2013–2017
John Carey	Labor	2017–present

== Election results ==
=== Elections in the 2020s ===
2025 Western Australian state election: Perth
Party	Candidate	Votes	%	±%
Labor	John Carey	12,592	48.9	−14.5
Liberal	Sean Butler	6,520	25.3	+7.4
Greens	Simone Springer	5,710	22.2	+6.2
Animal Justice	Grant Stewart	925	3.6	+3.6
Total formal votes		25,747	97.1	+0.3
Informal votes		774	2.9	−0.3
Turnout		26,521	83.1	+1.9
Two-party-preferred result
Labor	John Carey	18,267	71.0	−8.3
Liberal	Sean Butler	7,477	29.0	+8.3
Labor hold		Swing	−8.3	

2021 Western Australian state election: Perth
Party	Candidate	Votes	%	±%
Labor	John Carey	16,594	63.5	+16.3
Liberal	Kylee Veskovich	4,666	17.9	−15.2
Greens	Francesca Pandolfino	4,177	16.0	+1.5
No Mandatory Vaccination	Scott Beard	476	1.8	+1.8
WAxit	Angelo Minniti	225	0.9	0.0
Total formal votes		26,138	96.8	+0.5
Informal votes		858	3.2	−0.5
Turnout		26,996	84.1	+2.7
Two-party-preferred result
Labor	John Carey	20,719	79.3	+16.6
Liberal	Kylee Veskovich	5,418	20.7	−16.6
Labor hold		Swing	+16.6	

=== Elections in the 2010s ===
2017 Western Australian state election: Perth
Party	Candidate	Votes	%	±%
Labor	John Carey	11,137	46.5	+10.5
Liberal	Eleni Evangel	8,100	33.8	−15.1
Greens	Hannah Milligan	3,449	14.4	+1.6
Christians	Ken Lim	341	1.4	−0.0
Animal Justice	Matt Hanson	325	1.4	+1.4
Flux the System!	Ben Ballingall	266	1.1	+1.1
Micro Business	Archie Hyde	205	0.9	+0.9
Matheson for WA	Ian Molyneux	148	0.6	+0.6
Total formal votes		23,971	96.4	+2.1
Informal votes		907	3.6	−2.1
Turnout		24,878	83.4	+1.1
Two-party-preferred result
Labor	John Carey	14,815	61.8	+14.6
Liberal	Eleni Evangel	9,148	38.2	−14.6
Labor gain from Liberal		Swing	+14.6	

2013 Western Australian state election: Perth
Party	Candidate	Votes	%	±%
Liberal	Eleni Evangel	10,318	48.6	+12.0
Labor	John Hyde	7,666	36.1	−4.8
Greens	Jonathan Hallett	2,706	12.8	−6.6
Christians	Kevin Host	324	1.5	−1.5
Independent	Farida Iqbal	198	0.9	+0.9
Total formal votes		21,212	94.2	
Informal votes		1,300	5.8	
Turnout		22,512	86.4	
Two-party-preferred result
Liberal	Eleni Evangel	11,165	52.6	+10.4
Labor	John Hyde	10,045	47.4	−10.4
Liberal gain from Labor		Swing	+10.4	

=== Elections in the 2000s ===
2008 Western Australian state election: Perth
Party	Candidate	Votes	%	±%
Labor	John Hyde	7,724	41.00	–7.01
Liberal	Chris Edwards	6,907	36.67	+2.82
Greens	Jonathan Hallett	3,631	19.28	+6.47
Christian Democrats	Guennadi Moukine	576	3.06	+0.49
Total formal votes		18,837	94.90	+0.01
Informal votes		1,013	5.10	–0.01
Turnout		19,850	81.42	–6.36
Two-party-preferred result
Labor	John Hyde	10,899	57.84	–2.96
Liberal	Chris Edwards	7,937	42.16	+2.96
Labor hold		Swing	–2.96	

2005 Western Australian state election: Perth
Party	Candidate	Votes	%	±%
Labor	John Hyde	11,303	49.07	+3.44
Liberal	David Lagan	7,596	32.97	+0.91
Greens	Damian Douglas-Meyer	2,982	12.94	+1.94
Christian Democrats	Gus Loh	594	2.58	+2.58
Independent	Don Hyland	375	1.63	+1.63
One Nation	Marie Edmonds	186	0.81	−3.34
Total formal votes		23,036	94.89	+0.82
Informal votes		1,240	5.11	−0.82
Turnout		24,276	87.78	+0.53
Two-party-preferred result
Labor	John Hyde	14,287	62.04	+0.78
Liberal	David Lagan	8,741	37.96	−0.78
Labor hold		Swing	0.78	

2001 Western Australian state election: Perth
Party	Candidate	Votes	%	±%
Labor	John Hyde	8,423	45.63	−1.33
Liberal	Peter Boyle	5,918	32.06	−5.01
Greens	Su Hsien-Lee	2,031	11.00	−0.53
Democrats	Paul Hubbard	819	4.44	+4.44
One Nation	John Hakesley	766	4.15	+4.15
Independent	Dave Chambers	303	1.64	+1.64
	Julius Re	103	0.56	+0.56
	Roberto Jorquera	99	0.53	+0.53
Total formal votes		18,461	94.07	−0.65
Informal votes		1,163	5.93	+0.65
Turnout		19,624	87.25	+0.94
Two-party-preferred result
Labor	John Hyde	11,263	61.26	+3.33
Liberal	Peter Boyle	7,123	38.74	−3.33
Labor hold		Swing	3.33	

=== Elections in the 1990s ===
1996 Western Australian state election: Perth
Party	Candidate	Votes	%	±%
Labor	Diana Warnock	8,501	46.96	+2.60
Liberal	Janet Davidson	6,710	37.07	−1.62
Greens	Elena Jeffreys	2,087	11.53	+5.19
Independent	Raymond Conder	803	4.44	
Other				−10.61
Total formal votes		18,101	94.72	+1.83
Informal votes		1,008	5.28	−1.83
Turnout		19,109	86.31	−4.86
Two-party-preferred result
Labor	Diana Warnock	10,461	57.93	+3.53
Liberal	Janet Davidson	7,597	42.07	−3.53
Labor hold		Swing	3.53	

1993 Western Australian state election: Perth
Party	Candidate	Votes	%	±%
Liberal	Hal Colebatch	7,741	42.4	−0.7
Labor	Diana Warnock	7,167	39.3	−6.6
Independent	Kathleen Mallott	1,351	7.4	+7.4
Greens	Penelope Robinson	1,319	7.2	+7.2
Democratic Socialist	Michelle Hovane	276	1.5	+1.5
Independent	Christopher Bignell	145	0.8	+0.8
Independent	Life Addvalue	137	0.8	+0.8
	Alexander Manfrin	122	0.7	+0.7
Total formal votes		18,258	7.1	+1.3
Informal votes		1,398	7.1	−1.3
Turnout		19,656	91.2	+2.7
Two-party-preferred result
Labor	Diana Warnock	9,182	50.3	−0.9
Liberal	Hal Colebatch	9,076	49.7	+0.9
Labor hold		Swing	−0.9	

=== Elections in the 1980s ===
1989 Western Australian state election: Perth
Party	Candidate	Votes	%	±%
Labor	Ian Alexander	8,305	45.9	+12.8
Liberal	Kim Hames	7,806	43.1	+3.9
Democrats	Frederick Long	1,023	5.7	+5.7
Grey Power	Gerrard Taylor	974	5.4	+5.4
Total formal votes		18,108	91.6	
Informal votes		1,654	8.4	
Turnout		19,762	88.5	
Two-party-preferred result
Labor	Ian Alexander	9,263	51.2	−8.5
Liberal	Kim Hames	8,845	48.8	+8.5
Labor hold		Swing	−8.5	

1987 Perth state by-election
Party	Candidate	Votes	%	±%
Labor	Ian Alexander	6,805	56.2	−7.1
Liberal	Michael Lekias	4,707	38.8	+5.4
Educationalist	Charles Hall	607	5.0	+5.0
Total formal votes		12,119	94.2	−1.1
Informal votes		748	5.8	+1.1
Turnout		12,867	74.2	−13.4
Labor hold		Swing	N/A	

- Preferences were not distributed.

1986 Western Australian state election: Perth
Party	Candidate	Votes	%	±%
Labor	Terry Burke	9,644	63.3	−4.5
Liberal	Peter Evans	5,090	33.4	+1.2
Independent	Michael Crossing	510	3.3	+3.3
Total formal votes		15,244	95.3	−0.2
Informal votes		746	4.7	+0.2
Turnout		15,990	87.6	+6.9
Two-party-preferred result
Labor	Terry Burke	9,893	64.9	−2.9
Liberal	Peter Evans	5,351	35.1	+2.9
Labor hold		Swing	−2.9	

1983 Western Australian state election: Perth
Party	Candidate	Votes	%	±%
Labor	Terry Burke	9,023	67.8	
Liberal	Peter Bogue	4,289	32.2	
Total formal votes		13,312	95.5	
Informal votes		630	4.5	
Turnout		13,942	80.7	
Labor hold		Swing		

1980 Western Australian state election: Perth
Party	Candidate	Votes	%	±%
Labor	Terry Burke	6,638	61.8	+2.1
Liberal	Bernard Smith	3,515	32.7	−7.6
Independent	James Connolly	597	5.5	+5.5
Total formal votes		10,750	94.3	−1.9
Informal votes		650	5.7	+1.9
Turnout		11,400	80.2	−5.0
Two-party-preferred result
Labor	Terry Burke	7,116	66.2	+6.5
Liberal	Bernard Smith	3,634	33.8	−6.5
Labor hold		Swing	+6.5	

=== Elections in the 1970s ===
1977 Western Australian state election: Perth
Party	Candidate	Votes	%	±%
Labor	Terry Burke	7,525	59.7	
Liberal	Hal Colebatch	5,083	40.3	
Total formal votes		12,608	96.2	
Informal votes		504	3.8	
Turnout		13,112	85.2	
Labor hold		Swing		

1974 Western Australian state election: Perth
Party	Candidate	Votes	%	±%
Labor	Terry Burke	6,997	59.6	
Liberal	Julius Re	3,769	32.1	
National Alliance	Robert Burns	518	4.4	
Australia	William Barrett	456	3.9	
Total formal votes		11,740	92.6	
Informal votes		933	7.4	
Turnout		12,673	84.1	
Two-party-preferred result
Labor	Terry Burke	7,303	62.2	
Liberal	Julius Re	4,437	37.8	
Labor hold		Swing		

1971 Western Australian state election: Perth
Party	Candidate	Votes	%	±%
Labor	Terry Burke	5,002	56.0	+6.1
Liberal	Bob Pike	2,851	31.9	−3.4
Democratic Labor	John Martyr	545	6.1	+2.3
Independent	Francesco Nesci	387	4.3	+4.3
Independent	John Dawson	91	1.0	+1.0
Independent	Thomas Cain	60	0.7	+0.7
Total formal votes		8,936	91.0	−4.7
Informal votes		888	9.0	+4.7
Turnout		9,824	84.9	−1.3
Two-party-preferred result
Labor	Terry Burke	5,352	59.9	+3.7
Liberal	Bob Pike	3,584	40.1	−3.7
Labor hold		Swing	+3.7	

=== Elections in the 1960s ===
1968 Western Australian state election: Perth
Party	Candidate	Votes	%	±%
Labor	Terry Burke	5,141	49.89	+2.49
Liberal	Peter Durack	3,643	35.35	−12.05
Independent	Paul Ritter	1,128	10.95	+10.95
Democratic Labor	William Spence	393	3.81	−1.44
Total formal votes		10,308	95.74	−0.23
Informal votes		458	4.26	+0.23
Turnout		10,763	86.19	−1.33
Labor gain from Liberal		Swing	+3.86	

1965 Western Australian state election: Perth
Party	Candidate	Votes	%	±%
Liberal	Peter Durack	4,428	47.40	+7.02
Labor	Stanley Heal	4,422	47.33	−6.03
Democratic Labor	Terence Merchant	491	5.25	−0.99
Total formal votes		9,341	95.97	−1.56
Informal votes		391	4.03	+1.56
Turnout		9,733	87.52	−2.45
Liberal gain from Labor		Swing	+6.32	

1962 Western Australian state election: Perth
Party	Candidate	Votes	%	±%
Labor	Stanley Heal	5,485	53.36	
Liberal	Raymond Waller Newland	4,151	40.38	
Democratic Labor	Terence Merchant	642	6.24	
Total formal votes		10,278	97.53	
Informal votes		260	2.47	
Turnout		10,538	89.97	
Labor hold		Swing	N/A	

=== Elections in the 1940s ===
1947 Western Australian state election: Perth
Party	Candidate	Votes	%	±%
Labor	Ted Needham	3,418	52.7	−6.7
Liberal	Stanley Perry	2,507	38.7	+17.1
Independent	Carlyle Ferguson	556	8.6	+8.6
Total formal votes		6,481	96.8	+0.4
Informal votes		214	3.2	−0.4
Turnout		6,695	86.1	−0.6
Labor hold		Swing	N/A	

- Preferences were not distributed.

1943 Western Australian state election: Perth
Party	Candidate	Votes	%	±%
Labor	Ted Needham	4,066	59.4	+10.2
Nationalist	William Murray	1,477	21.6	−8.4
Ind. Nationalist	Walter Maddeford	1,304	19.0	+19.0
Total formal votes		6,847	96.4	−1.8
Informal votes		258	3.6	+1.8
Turnout		7,105	86.7	+3.0
Labor hold		Swing	N/A	

- Preferences were not distributed.

=== Elections in the 1930s ===
1939 Western Australian state election: Perth
Party	Candidate	Votes	%	±%
Labor	Ted Needham	3,402	49.2	−4.7
Nationalist	Donald Cleland	2,078	30.0	+30.0
Nationalist	Harry Mann	1,435	20.7	−9.1
Total formal votes		6,915	98.2	+0.1
Informal votes		127	1.8	−0.1
Turnout		7,042	83.7	+15.4
Two-party-preferred result
Labor	Ted Needham	3,654	52.8	
Nationalist	Donald Cleland	3,261	47.2	
Labor hold		Swing	N/A	

1936 Western Australian state election: Perth
Party	Candidate	Votes	%	±%
Labor	Ted Needham	2,806	53.9	−4.5
Nationalist	Harry Mann	1,554	29.8	−11.8
Nationalist	William Murray	847	16.3	+16.3
Total formal votes		5,207	98.1	+0.4
Informal votes		100	1.9	−0.4
Turnout		5,307	68.3	−20.3
Labor hold		Swing	N/A	

- Preferences were not distributed.

1933 Western Australian state election: Perth
Party	Candidate	Votes	%	±%
Labor	Ted Needham	3,734	58.4	+12.3
Nationalist	Harry Mann	2,661	41.6	−11.5
Total formal votes		6,395	97.7	−0.8
Informal votes		149	2.3	+0.8
Turnout		6,544	89.1	+16.6
Labor gain from Nationalist		Swing	N/A	

1930 Western Australian state election: Perth
Party	Candidate	Votes	%	±%
Nationalist	Harry Mann	2,991	53.1	
Labor	Ted Needham	2,591	46.1	
Independent	John McCoo	45	0.8	
Total formal votes		5,627	98.5	
Informal votes		86	1.5	
Turnout		5,713	72.5	
Nationalist hold		Swing		

=== Elections in the 1920s ===
1927 Western Australian state election: Perth
Party	Candidate	Votes	%	±%
Nationalist	Harry Mann	1,656	50.0	−2.0
Labor	Cyril Longmore	1,368	41.3	−6.7
Nationalist	William Murray	285	8.6	+8.6
Total formal votes		3,309	96.6	−2.4
Informal votes		115	3.4	+2.4
Turnout		3,424	71.9	+23.7
Nationalist hold		Swing	N/A	

- Preferences were not distributed.

1924 Western Australian state election: Perth
Party	Candidate	Votes	%	±%
Nationalist	Harry Mann	1,395	52.0	+2.3
Labor	Richard Lane	1,288	48.0	+18.5
Total formal votes		2,683	99.0	+1.9
Informal votes		26	1.0	−1.9
Turnout		2,709	48.2	−14.7
Nationalist hold		Swing	N/A	

1921 Western Australian state election: Perth
Party	Candidate	Votes	%	±%
Nationalist	Harry Mann	1,356	49.7	−6.9
Labor	Herbert Swan	805	29.5	−3.6
Independent	Percy Brunton	293	10.7	+10.7
Independent	Thomas Molloy	273	10.0	+10.0
Total formal votes		2,727	97.1	+0.5
Informal votes		82	2.9	−0.5
Turnout		2,809	62.9	+8.5
After distribution of preferences
Nationalist	Harry Mann	1,504	55.1	
Labor	Herbert Swan	872	32.0	
Independent	Percy Brunton	351	12.9	
Nationalist hold		Swing	N/A	

=== Elections in the 1910s ===
1917 Western Australian state election: Perth
Party	Candidate	Votes	%	±%
Nationalist	Robert Pilkington	1,589	56.57	
Labor	Edmund Dunn	929	33.07	
Nationalist	Henry Mills	291	10.36	
Total formal votes		2,809	96.60	
Informal votes		99	3.40	
Turnout		2,908		

1917 by-election: Perth (21 July 1917)
Party	Candidate	Votes	%	±%
Nationalist	Robert Pilkington	1,029	47.77	
Nationalist	Thomas Molloy	713	33.10	
Nationalist	Francis Rea	412	19.13	
Total formal votes		2,154	97.47	
Informal votes		56	2.53	
Turnout		2,210		

1914 Western Australian state election: Perth
Party	Candidate	Votes	%	±%
Labor	Walter Dwyer	1,507	42.96	
Liberal	Sir James Connolly	1,340	38.20	
Liberal	Arthur Berryman	661	18.84	
Total formal votes		3,508	97.88	
Informal votes		76	2.12	
Turnout		3,584		
Two-party-preferred result
Liberal	Sir James Connolly	1,941	55.33	+8.64
Labor	Walter Dwyer	1,567	44.67	–8.64
Liberal gain from Labor		Swing	+8.64	

1911 Western Australian state election: Perth
Party	Candidate	Votes	%	±%
Labor	Walter Dwyer	1,932	53.31	
Ministerialist	Harry Brown	1,692	46.69	
Total formal votes		3,624	98.72	
Informal votes		47	1.28	
Turnout		3,671		

=== Elections in the 1900s ===
1908 Western Australian state election: Perth
Party	Candidate	Votes	%	±%
Ministerialist	Harry Brown	1,037	71.91	
Ministerialist	Arthur O'Connor	405	28.09	
Total formal votes		1,442	98.70	
Informal votes		19	1.30	
Turnout		1,461		

1905 Western Australian state election: Perth
Party	Candidate	Votes	%	±%
Ministerialist	Harry Brown	567	52.99	
Independent	Charles Moran	336	31.40	
Ministerialist	Henry Braidwood	167	15.61	
Total formal votes		1,070	98.17	
Informal votes		20	1.83	
Turnout		1,090		

1904 Western Australian state election: Perth
Party	Candidate	Votes	%	±%
Ministerialist	Harry Brown	990	62.98	
Labor	Frederick Gates	582	37.02	
Total formal votes		1,572	99.12	
Informal votes		14	0.88	
Turnout		1,586		

1901 ministerial by-election: Perth (6 December 1901)
Party	Candidate	Votes	%	±%
	William Purkiss	772	54.37	
	Frank Wilson	648	45.63	
Total formal votes		1,420	99.37	
Informal votes		9	0.63	
Turnout		1,429		

1901 Western Australian state election: Perth
Party	Candidate	Votes	%	±%
Opposition	Frank Wilson	691	65.37	
Ministerial (Throssell)	Thomas Molloy	366	34.63	
Total formal votes		1,057	99.16	
Informal votes		9	0.84	
Turnout		1,066		

=== Elections in the 1890s ===
1897 Western Australian colonial election: Perth
Party	Candidate	Votes	%	±%
Ministerial (Forrest)	Lyall Hall	268	50.47	
Opposition (Leake)	Stephen Henry Parker	263	49.53	
Total formal votes		531	98.33	
Informal votes		9	1.67	
Turnout		540		

1894 Western Australian colonial election: Perth
Party	Candidate	Votes	%	±%
	George Randell	378	61.26	
	Thomas Molloy	239	38.74	
Total formal votes		617	98.56	
Informal votes		9	1.44	
Turnout		626	66.10	

1892 by-election: Perth (12 January 1892)
Party	Candidate	Votes	%	±%
	Thomas Molloy	187	53.74	
	Edward Vivien Harvey Keane	161	46.36	
Total formal votes		348	95.60	
Informal votes		16	4.39	
Turnout		364	77.78	

1890 Western Australian colonial election: Perth
Party	Candidate	Votes	%	±%
	Edward Scott	234	61.58	
	Edward Kay Courthope	146	38.42	
Total formal votes		380		
Turnout		380	83.52	
