= Electoral district of Perth =

State electoral district of Western Australia

Perth Western Australia—Legislative Assembly
- Interactive map of electoral district boundaries from the 2025 state election
- State: Western Australia
- Dates current: 1890–1950, 1962–present
- MP: John Carey
- Party: Labor
- Namesake: Perth
- Electors: 31,903 (2025)
- Area: 20 km^{2} (7.7 sq mi)
- Demographic: Metropolitan
- Coordinates: 31.95°S 115.84°E
Electorates around Perth:
Churchlands	Balcatta	Mount Lawley
Nedlands	Perth	Victoria Park
Nedlands	South Perth	Victoria Park

The electoral district of Perth is a Legislative Assembly electorate in the state of Western Australia. Perth is named for the capital city of Western Australia whose central business district falls within its borders. It is one of the oldest electorates in Western Australia, with its first member having been elected in the inaugural 1890 elections of the Legislative Assembly.

Perth has traditionally been a safe Labor seat, but was briefly held by Liberal Eleni Evangel between 2013 and 2017. Perth is currently held by Labor MLA John Carey.

== Geography ==
Boundaries of Perth, 1962–2005.

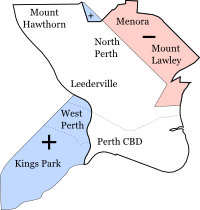
Map showing 2005 boundaries and changes at the 2007 redistribution.

Perth is bounded by the Swan River to the south and southeast, Mitchell Freeway and Thomas Street to the west, Green Street to the north, and Walcott Street to the northeast. Its boundaries include the suburbs of East Perth, Highgate, Leederville, Mount Hawthorn, Northbridge, North Perth, Perth and West Perth along with part of Mount Lawley southwest of Walcott Street. Major features inside the electorate include Perth's central business district, Kings Park, the East Perth redevelopment precinct and Hyde Park.

Historically, the boundaries included a much smaller area. In 1911, it only covered the central business district and Northbridge, and in 1929, a section between Newcastle and Bulwer Streets was added. When it was recreated from parts of the abolished West Perth and East Perth districts at the 1961 redistribution, the Perth electorate included all of West Perth and part of Kings Park, but its northern boundary only extended to Vincent Street, Hyde Park and the East Perth railway station. The 1972 redistribution added part of West Leederville east of Kimberley Street, and extended the northern boundary to include southern Leederville and parts of North Perth and Mount Lawley. By 1982, it extended to Walcott Street, and the 1994 redistribution saw it extend well into the former seat of Mount Lawley.

The 2007 redistribution, which came into effect at the 2008 election, removed Menora and parts of Mount Lawley northeast of Walcott Street, while including all of West Perth as well as Kings Park, which had previously been part of Nedlands.

== Demographics ==
As redistributions alter an electorate's area and demographic profile, the 2006 Census conducted by the Australian Bureau of Statistics on the boundaries prior to the redistribution is the main source of information on the electorate's current profile. At the 2006 census, the median age of the electorate's residents was 35 years, compared to 36 across metropolitan Perth—only 12.1% of the electorate's population (compared with 19.5%) were below 15, but the 25–54 age group was significantly greater. Only 53.7% of its residents were born in Australia, compared to 61.5% in Perth, and much less of the remainder were from northwestern Europe (10.78% as against 13.93%). At home, significantly more electorate residents spoke Italian, Cantonese, Mandarin and Greek at home, and whilst the top three religions (Catholicism, no religion and Anglicanism) differed little from other parts of Perth, Buddhism and Eastern Orthodox adherents outnumbered those of the Uniting Church. Only 36% were married compared to 49% across Perth, whilst only 47.7% of homes (compared to 67.2%) were fully owned or being purchased. The median income in the electorate was $606 compared with $513, and 49.5% of the electorate's workers were professionals or managers compared with 31.8%.

In the 2007 redistribution, Menora, with a median income of $397 and a median age of 48, with 42.5% being 55 years or over, was removed, whilst West Perth, with a slightly larger population and a median income of $698 and a median age of 34, and a higher percentage of professionals and managers than the electorate's average, was added.

The Australian Bureau of Statistics do not collect data on sexuality, but the electorate is home to a significant portion of Perth's gay community. Perth's main gay venues, Connections Nightclub and the Court Hotel, as well as events such as the Pride Parade and Fairday, are located in the electorate.

== History ==
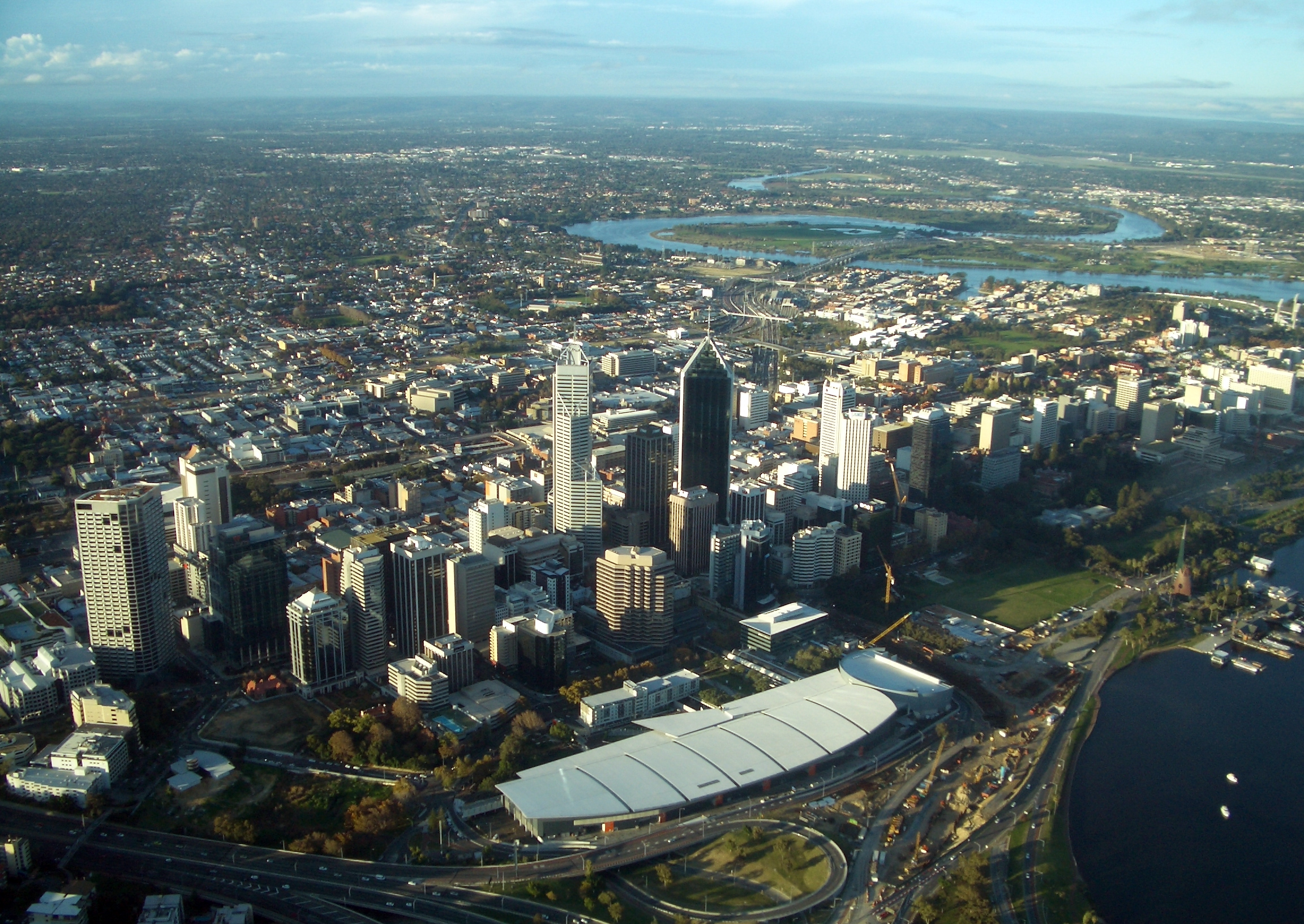
The southern and eastern parts of the electorate, as seen from the air.

The electoral district of Perth was created as one of the initial 30 single-member districts, and one of only six in the Perth–Fremantle area.Its first member, who was elected on 10 December 1890, was Dr Edward Scott, a doctor by training who had been elected as Mayor of Perth the previous year. He resigned in December 1891, and was replaced at the resulting by-election on 12 January 1892 by Thomas Molloy. Molloy became embroiled in a controversy regarding provision of state aid to private schools, which he and fellow Catholic MLAs Timothy Quinlan and Alfred Canning supported. The Catholic Vicar General, Father Anselm Bourke, established the Education Defence League with their assistance. However, the issue became a major one in the 1894 election amongst the voting public, and all three MLAs lost their seats, Molloy losing to George Randell, a prominent Congregationalist who had led the cause against state aid. Randell became the Opposition Leader to Premier John Forrest, but stepped down from that role a year later in July 1895, and did not contest the 1897 election, which was won by a supporter of Forrest.

In the 1901 election, after which the Oppositionists under George Leake were able to form a minority government, Frank Wilson, formerly the member for Canning, won the seat. After five months, the Leake government failed, and the governor eventually invited Alf Morgans of the Ministerial Party to form a government and appoint a six-member Ministry. Morgans appointed Wilson minister of mines and commissioner of railways on 21 November 1901. Until 1947, members of parliament who were appointed as ministers were required to resign their seat and recontest it at a ministerial by-election, which was normally a fairly non-eventful matter. However, Leake and his allies contested the six by-elections with such organised campaigning that three of the six ministers, including Wilson, were defeated.

In 1911, the seat was won for the first time for the Labor Party by Walter Dwyer, a lawyer who helped to draft the Industrial Arbitration Act 1912 during the first Scaddan administration; however, he was defeated by James Connolly of the new Liberal Party in 1914. Connolly became a minister without portfolio in the new Wilson government in 1916, but resigned in June 1917 when appointed to the role of Agent General for Western Australia. Robert Pilkington of the Nationalist Party won the subsequent by-election on 21 July 1917 and election two months later, before leaving for England in 1921. Harry Mann, a former detective who, amongst other things, oversaw gaming and racing, was elected in his place.

A controversy erupted in 1933 upon the establishment of a Lotteries Commission, to which Mann, along with John Scaddan and Legislative Council member Alec Clydesdale, were appointed. Several profitable newspaper competitions, including that of The Sunday Times, were prohibited due to being thinly disguised forms of gambling. In response, a Citizens' Reform League was formed to defend the crosswords, and at the elections later that year, both Mann and Scaddan lost their seats—with Perth being won by former Labor Senator Ted Needham, who was to hold the seat until its abolition at the 1950 election, and North Perth for the following three years until his retirement. One sideline to Needham's campaigns was watchmaker and jeweller William Murray, who had placed a public notice in The West Australian on 28 October 1930 stating that Parliament "has become an out-of-date instrument for achieving the will of Anglo-Saxon peoples" and seeking names and addresses of anyone wishing to work towards overthrowing it—and then ran for election as a Nationalist in 1936 and 1943.

The seat was re-established at the 1962 election with different boundaries—the neighbouring seats of West Perth, East Perth and North Perth having all been abolished in the 1961 redistribution—and was won by Labor's Stanley Heal, the previous member for West Perth. He was defeated at the 1965 election by Peter Durack of the Liberal Country League, who was in turn defeated by Terry Burke in 1968. Burke, the brother of Brian Burke who went on to serve as Premier from 1983 until 1988, went on to hold the seat for 19 years until 1987. He faced some high-profile Liberal opponents, including future Legislative Councillor Bob Pike in 1971, historian and author Hal G.P. Colebatch in 1977 and Olympic swimmer Peter Evans in 1986.

Burke resigned in 1987, and Labor's Dr Ian Alexander, a City of Perth councillor and town planner from the party's left faction, won the subsequent by-election on 9 May 1987. He spent much of his parliamentary time on Aboriginal issues, sustainability and the environment and the Northern Suburbs Transit System project. On 4 March 1991, Ian Alexander resigned from the Labor party citing "frequent breaches of the party's basic principles and platforms", and sat as an independent until the 1993 election. Dr Alexander did not stand for election in 1993, and Labor's Diana Warnock, a former radio talk-show host, won the seat with 50.29% of the two-party-preferred vote against the Liberals' Hal G.P. Colebatch.

On 21 October 1999, Warnock announced her departure at the next election for personal reasons, and threw her support behind former Town of Vincent mayor John Hyde, a member of the Centre faction of the Labor Party who had the support of the Left faction and some Centre members of Parliament. However, the key Centre unions had backed former ministerial adviser Adele Farina for the post, and Labor's affirmative action policy for candidates in winnable seats meant that failing to pick a female candidate would risk sitting male MPs. A week later, the Centre faction openly split, with a breakaway group endorsing Hyde. On 5 November, Farina withdrew from the contest, leaving Hyde to be preselected unopposed ahead of the 2001 election. He maintained the seat for Labor at the election, becoming the first openly gay man to sit in the Western Australian parliament.

On 9 March 2013, Liberal candidate and City of Perth councillor Eleni Evangel defeated Hyde and Labor in an upset victory with a significant swing amid the Liberals' decisive victory that year, becoming the first Liberal member for Perth since the 1960s. However, Evangel was herself swept out four years later by Labor's John Carey, the mayor of the City of Vincent, amid the Liberals' collapse in the metropolitan area.

== Members for Perth ==
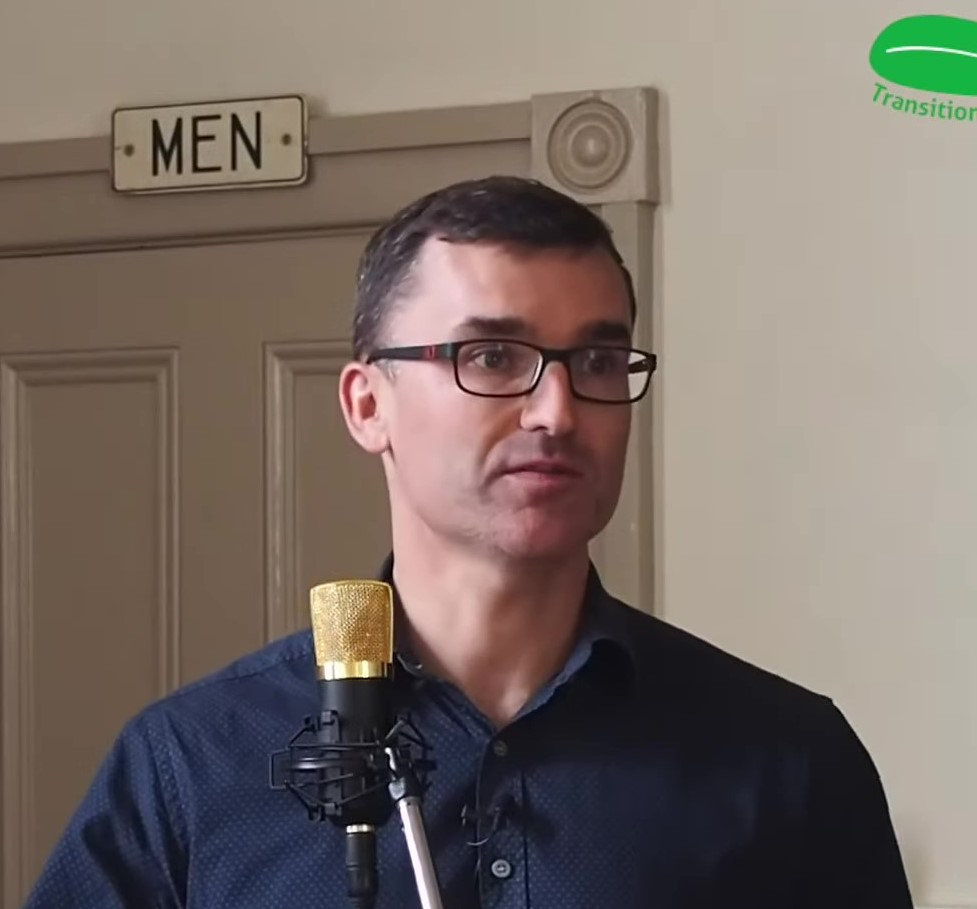
John Carey, the current member for Perth

Perth (1890–1950)
Member	Party	Term
Edward Scott	Non-aligned	1890–1892
Thomas Molloy	Non-aligned	1892–1894
George Randell	Oppositionist	1894–1897
Lyall Hall	Ministerialist	1897–1901
Frank Wilson	Ministerialist	1901
William Purkiss	Oppositionist	1901–1904
Harry Brown	Ministerialist	1904–1911
Sir Walter Dwyer	Labor	1911–1914
Sir James Connolly	Liberal	1914–1917
Robert Pilkington	Nationalist	1917–1921
Harry Mann	Nationalist	1921–1933
Ted Needham	Labor	1933–1950
Perth (1961–present)
Member	Party	Term
Stanley Heal	Labor	1962–1965
Peter Durack	LCL	1965–1968
Terry Burke	Labor	1968–1987
Dr Ian Alexander	Labor	1987–1991
Dr Ian Alexander	Independent	1991–1993
Diana Warnock	Labor	1993–2001
John Hyde	Labor	2001–2013
Eleni Evangel	Liberal	2013–2017
John Carey	Labor	2017–present

== Election results ==
2025 Western Australian state election: Perth
Party	Candidate	Votes	%	±%
Labor	John Carey	12,592	48.9	−14.5
Liberal	Sean Butler	6,520	25.3	+7.4
Greens	Simone Springer	5,710	22.2	+6.2
Animal Justice	Grant Stewart	925	3.6	+3.6
Total formal votes		25,747	97.1	+0.3
Informal votes		774	2.9	−0.3
Turnout		26,521	83.1	+1.9
Two-party-preferred result
Labor	John Carey	18,267	71.0	−8.3
Liberal	Sean Butler	7,477	29.0	+8.3
Labor hold		Swing	−8.3	
