= Ernest Randell =

Australian cricketer (1873–1938)

Personal information
- Full name: Ernest Arthur Randell
- Born: 25 January 1873; Perth, Western Australia
- Died: 12 May 1938 (aged 65); Perth, Western Australia
- Batting: Left-handed
- Bowling: Slow left-arm orthodox

Domestic team information
- Years: Team
- 1892/93–1898/99: Western Australia

Career statistics
Competition	First-class
Matches	3
Runs scored	60
Batting average	10.00
100s/50s	0/0
Top score	36
Balls bowled	324
Wickets	4
Bowling average	28.50
5 wickets in innings	0
10 wickets in match	0
Best bowling	2/31
Catches/stumpings	1/–
- Source: CricketArchive, 2 December 2012

Ernest Arthur Randell (25 January 1873 – 12 May 1938) was an Australian cricketer who played three first-class matches for Western Australia in the 1890s. He was an all-rounder who batted left-handed and bowled left-arm orthodox spin.

== Early life ==
Randell was born in Perth to Mary Louise (née Smith) and George Randell, his father being a prominent businessman and member of parliament. After his mother's death in August 1874, his father remarried to Lucy James Francisco, who had been widowed the previous year. Randell thus became the step-brother of Walter James (ten years his elder), who would later become Premier of Western Australia.

== Cricket career ==
Randell played for the Perth Cricket Club in WACA grade cricket, and led the competition's batting aggregates during the 1890–91 season. He was selected to tour the eastern colonies with a state team in early 1893, and played in both first-class matches on tour, against South Australia and Victoria. He opened the batting with William Back in the second match. Randell's only further first-class appearance came when South Australia toured Western Australia at the end of the 1898–99 season. Batting at number ten in both innings, he scored 36 runs in the second, his highest first-class score. Randell continued to play at a high level for several more years.

== Later life ==
Randell worked for periods in Western Australia's Education and Treasury Departments, and later in the private sector. He was a resident of Gunyidi, a small town in the Mid West, for a period of time. Following his father into the Congregationalist movement, Randell was heavily involved with the Trinity Congregational Church in Perth, serving as a church officer as well as superintendent of the church's Sunday school. He died at the Mount Hospital in Perth in May 1938, and was buried in the Congregational section of Karrakatta Cemetery.
