= John Hyde (footballer) =

Australian rules footballer (1930–2020)

Personal information
- Full name: John Charles Arthur Hyde
- Born: 11 April 1930
- Died: 26 March 2020 (aged 89)
- Original team: Portarlington
- Height: 184 cm (6 ft 0 in)
- Weight: 86 kg (190 lb)

Playing career^{1}
Years	Club	Games (Goals)
1948–1954	Geelong	108 (12)
1955–1956	Claremont	37 (?)
- ^{1} Playing statistics correct to the end of 1956.

Career highlights
- Geelong Best & Fairest 1950; Geelong Premiership 1951, 1952; Claremont Best & Fairest 1955

John Charles Arthur Hyde (11 April 1930 – 26 March 2020) was an Australian rules footballer in the Victorian Football League (VFL) for the Geelong Football Club.

Originally from Portarlington, Victoria, Hyde won Geelong's best and fairest award in 1950 before playing in their back-to-back premierships in 1951 and 1952. Hyde left Victoria after the 1954 VFL season to join Claremont in the West Australian National Football League (WANFL) as captain-coach.

Hyde died of cancer on 26 March 2020.

His son, John Norman Hyde, was a member of the Western Australian Legislative Assembly from 2001 to 2013.
