= Lyall Hall =

Australian politician

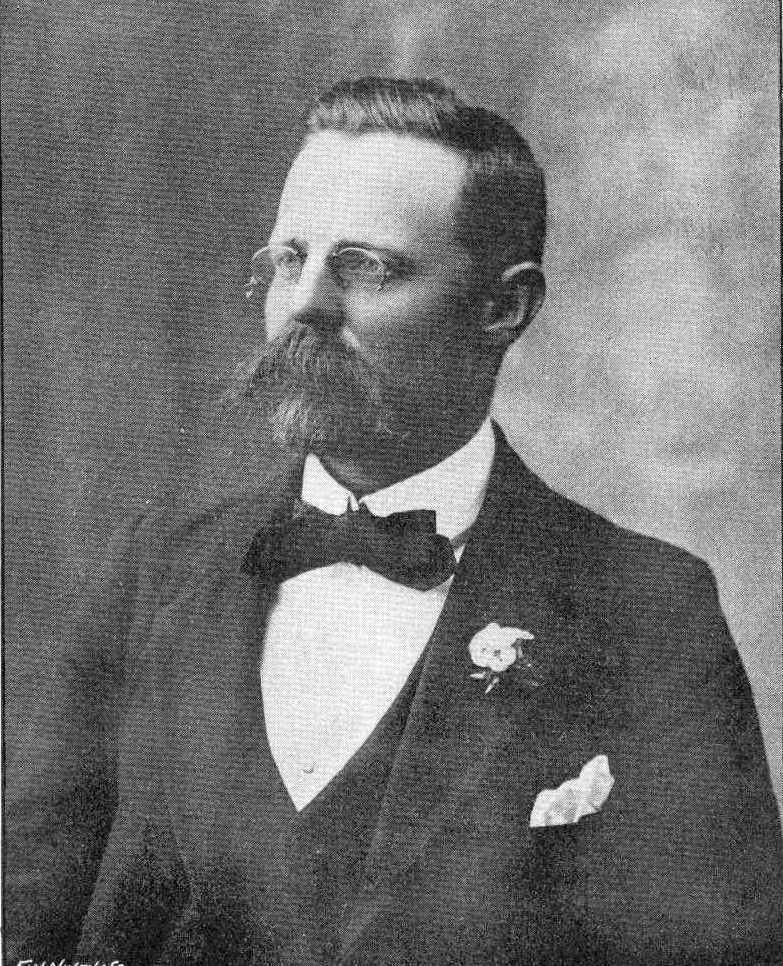

Member of the Legislative Assembly of Western Australia
- Preceded by: George Randell
- Succeeded by: Frank Wilson
- Constituency: Perth

Personal details
- Born: 22 July 1861 Avoca, Victoria
- Died: 23 May 1935 (aged 73) Subiaco, Western Australia
- Spouse: Mary Page
- Profession: Commission agent

Henry Lyall Hall (22 July 1861 – 23 May 1935) was an Australian politician, serving as the member for Perth in the Legislative Assembly from 1897 until 1901.

== Parliamentary Service ==
House	MLA
Party	Forrest Party
Date Elected	5 May 1897
Electorate	Perth
Service	Electorates

== Biography ==
Hall was born at Homebush near Avoca, Victoria, Australia, to Henry Hall, a miner and newspaper editor, and Elizabeth Bethell. He became a public servant in Victoria and was a telegraph clerk at Emerald Hill in 1884. On 11 December 1884 in Ballarat, he married Mary Page, with whom he had one son and four daughters. They moved to Western Australia in 1894, where he worked as an auctioneer and general land agent. In 1896 he was elected to the North Ward of Perth City Council for a two-year term, and after joining the governing Forrest party, he won the seat of Perth in the Legislative Assembly at the 1897 elections against Stephen Henry Parker. During this time, he was also active in advocating for the establishment of Hyde Park, then known as Third Swamp and used as a camping ground for travellers, to be converted into public gardens to allow citizens to better enjoy Perth's prosperity. The reserve was declared on 30 September 1897 and, after design work by Hall and Thomas Mews, development work proceeded through 1898 and 1899.

He did not contest the 1901 election. After 1907, he became an investor and speculator in real estate and was a member of the Wembley Park progress association. He died on 23 October 1935 at St John of God Hospital in Subiaco, and was buried in the Anglican section of Karrakatta Cemetery.

Parliament of Western Australia
Preceded by George Randell	Member for Perth; 1897–1901	Succeeded by Frank Wilson
