= 1892 Perth colonial by-election =

By-election in Western Australia

The 1892 Perth colonial by-election was a by-election held on 12 January 1892 for the Western Australian Legislative Assembly seat of Perth, which covered the city of Perth and its immediate environs.

The by-election was triggered by the resignation of the sitting member, Dr Edward Scott. Scott had been elected at the inaugural elections of the Assembly on 10 December 1890, and served both as the member and the Mayor of Perth. He travelled to England following the completion of his mayoral term, and by mid-November 1891, it had become clear he intended to resign his parliamentary seat, and he sent a telegram to the Speaker and a letter to his lawyer, Mr E. Sholl. However, under the Constitution Act 1889, his seat could not be declared vacant as the Act stipulated he had to resign "under his own hand" to the Speaker. This arrived by mail from England on 18 December 1891, and on 22 December, the seat was declared vacant and writs issued for a by-election to elect a new member.

== Timeline ==
Date	Event
18 November 1891	Edward Scott made known his intention to resign.
18 December 1891	The Speaker received his resignation by mail from England.
22 December 1891	Writs were issued by the Speaker of the Legislative Assembly to proceed with a by-election. The Town Hall was appointed as the place for nomination and voting.
5 January 1892	Close of nominations, at which stage two candidates had nominated.
12 January 1892	Polling day, between the hours of 8am and 6pm.
13 January 1892	The writ was returned and the results formally declared.

== Candidates ==
The by-election attracted two candidates.

Edward Vivien Harvey Keane, the mayor of Perth, had recently resigned his seat at Geraldton due to business interests, and was a contractor for the Midland Railway. He was supported by some Ministerial members of Parliament and by Timothy Quinlan, the member for West Perth who had recently joined the Opposition grouping.

Thomas Molloy, the senior councillor of the Perth City Council, also nominated. Molloy was supported by the Trades and Labor Council, as well as several Opposition members of Parliament including Alfred Canning and William Loton.

== Results ==
Within 50 minutes of the close of voting, it was clear that Molloy had won. 16 informal ballots were recorded, of which 7 were proxy votes which did not contain a date, whilst 9 had incorrectly voted at the booth. Molloy later addressed a large gathering in front of the People newspaper office in Murray Street, and the following evening, took up his seat in the Legislative Assembly next to Lancel de Hamel, the unofficial Opposition leader.

1892 by-election: Perth (12 January 1892)
Party	Candidate	Votes	%	±%
Opposition	Thomas Molloy	187	53.74	
Ministerialist	Edward Vivien Harvey Keane	161	46.36	
Total formal votes		348	95.60	
Informal votes		16	4.39	
Turnout		364	77.78	
