= Harry Mann =

Australian politician (1873–1952)

Member of the Legislative Assembly of Western Australia
- In office 12 March 1921 – 8 April 1933
- Preceded by: Robert Pilkington
- Succeeded by: Ted Needham
- Constituency: Perth

Personal details
- Born: 18 July 1873 Talbot, Victoria, Australia
- Died: 4 October 1952 (aged 79) Perth, Western Australia
- Party: Nationalist

Henry Willoughby Mann (18 July 1873 – 4 October 1952) was an Australian police officer and politician who was a Nationalist Party member of the Legislative Assembly of Western Australia from 1921 to 1933, representing the seat of Perth.

Mann was born in Talbot, Victoria, to Mary Jane (née Willoughby) and Henry Boar Mann. He came to Western Australia in 1895, and in 1897 joined the Western Australia Police. By his retirement in 1920, Mann had reached the rank of detective inspector and served as the chief of the Criminal Investigations Branch (CIB). He was very active in the Perth community, serving at various points as governor of the Perth Children's Hospital, president of the East Perth Football Club, president of the Ugly Men's Association (a charity group), and chairman of a school for returned soldiers.

At the 1921 state election, Mann won the seat of Perth as a Nationalist candidate, replacing the retiring Robert Pilkington. He was re-elected on another three occasions, but was defeated by the Labor Party's Ted Needham at the 1933 election. Mann re-contested Perth at the 1936 and 1939 elections, but was defeated by Needham on both occasions. In 1940, he stood for the Legislative Council as an independent, but was defeated by Hubert Parker in Metropolitan-Suburban Province. Mann died at Royal Perth Hospital in December 1952, aged 81. He had been hit by a trolleybus earlier in the year, but an inquest found that this had not been the ultimate cause of his death.

Parliament of Western Australia
Preceded by Robert Pilkington	Member for Perth; 1921–1933	Succeeded by Ted Needham
