= Harry Brown (Australian politician) =

Australian politician

Mayor of Perth
- In office 1 December 1902 – 15 November 1905
- Preceded by: William Loton
- Succeeded by: Sydney Stubbs

Member of the Legislative Assembly of Western Australia
- In office 28 June 1904 – 3 October 1911
- Preceded by: William Purkiss
- Succeeded by: Walter Dwyer
- Constituency: Perth

Personal details
- Born: 6 May 1863 Leighton Buzzard, Bedfordshire, England
- Died: 19 January 1925 (aged 61) West Perth, Western Australia, Australia

Harry Brown (6 May 1863 – 19 January 1925) was an Australian politician who was Mayor of Perth from 1903 to 1905. He also served as a member of the Legislative Assembly of Western Australia from 1904 to 1911, representing the seat of Perth.

Brown was born in Leighton Buzzard, Bedfordshire, England, to Ellen (née O'Donell) and Thomas Brown. From 1883 to 1887, he lived in Cape Colony, where he was a captain in the Cape Mounted Riflemen. After arriving in Western Australia, Brown initially worked as a law clerk for the firm of Septimus Burt and Edward Albert Stone. He then worked as a secretary for the Perth Building Society, which he eventually came to manage. Brown was elected to the Perth City Council in 1898, and elected mayor in 1902, replacing William Loton. He left office in November 1905 after just under three years, having chosen not to recontest the position, and it was reported by The Daily News that "his popularity [had] not waned, but [had] rather increased as the result of his years of office".

At the 1904 state election, while still serving as mayor, Brown won the Legislative Assembly seat of Perth. He was re-elected at the 1905 and 1908 elections, but was defeated by the Labor Party's Walter Dwyer at the 1911 election, who became the first member of his party to win the seat. Throughout his time in parliament, Brown belonged to the Ministerialist faction, supporting the governments of Hector Rason, Newton Moore, and Frank Wilson. He died in Perth in January 1925, aged 61. He had married Myra Minnie Pether in 1890, with whom he had two children.

Parliament of Western Australia
Preceded by William Purkiss	Member for Perth; 1904–1911	Succeeded by Walter Dwyer
