= Thomas Molloy =

Australian politician

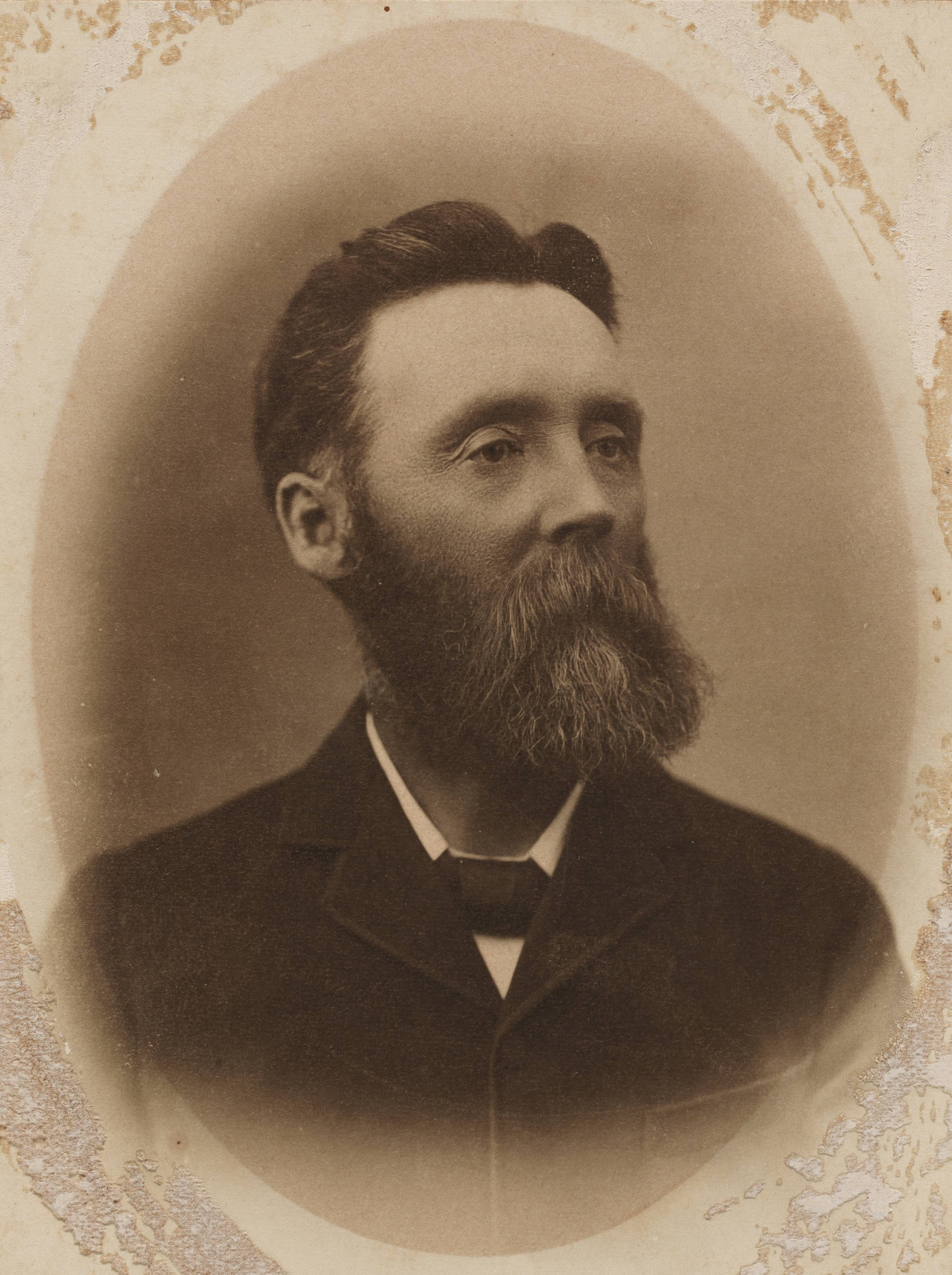
- Molloy c. 1890

Member of the Western Australian Legislative Assembly
- In office 13 January 1892 – 15 June 1894
- Preceded by: Edward Scott
- Succeeded by: George Randell
- Constituency: Perth

Personal details
- Born: 4 October 1852 Toronto, Canada West
- Died: 16 February 1938 (aged 85) Subiaco, Western Australia
- Spouses: Amelia Littlejohn (1873–1888); Mary Reaney McHale (1889–1925)
- Profession: Printer, store manager, real estate speculator

Thomas George Anstruther Molloy (4 October 1852 – 16 February 1938) was an Australian politician. He was a member of the Western Australian Legislative Assembly (MLA) for the electorate of Perth from 1892 until 1894, and thereafter became a perennial candidate, unsuccessfully standing for parliament 14 times. He also served two terms as the Mayor of Perth, from 1908 to 1909 and from 1911 to 1912. Molloy made a significant contribution to the cultural life of Perth, building numerous hotels and the first two theatres in the city, most notably His Majesty's Theatre, which is still open today.

== Biography ==
Molloy was born in Toronto, Canada West, to John Molloy, a soldier who served with the Royal Welch Fusiliers in the Crimean War and the Indian Mutiny of 1857, and Jane née Curtis. In 1862, they migrated to colonial Western Australia, where John Molloy served as a Pensioner Guard supervising convicts who had been transported from the United Kingdom. Thomas Molloy, meanwhile, attended Christian Brothers College, Perth, and left school at the age of 13 to work at a printing office. He then worked in the cooperative movement with J. T. Reilly, and became manager of the city cooperative store at the corner of Barrack and Murray streets. By 1870, his successes enabled him to buy the entire block between Murray and Wellington streets for £900, equivalent to A$141,500 in 2022.

On 18 February 1873, he married Amelia Littlejohn, with whom he had two daughters and one son. They moved to South Australia, where he worked as a merchant, but returned to Perth in 1875 where he became a successful baker, not only owning his Goderich Street shop but also 10 two-roomed cottages for his workers. Returning to printing, he worked on the Daily News from 1881, and then from 1884 became commercial manager for The West Australian. He became involved in buying and selling real estate in the central and western parts of the city, and by the 1890s with the onset of the gold rush and the resulting flow of capital into Western Australia, this had proved profitable enough an enterprise that he was of independent means and had become one of the largest landowners in Perth. His wife died on 21 April 1888, and he subsequently married Mary Reaney McHale on 23 January 1889, with whom he had two daughters.

=== Political life ===
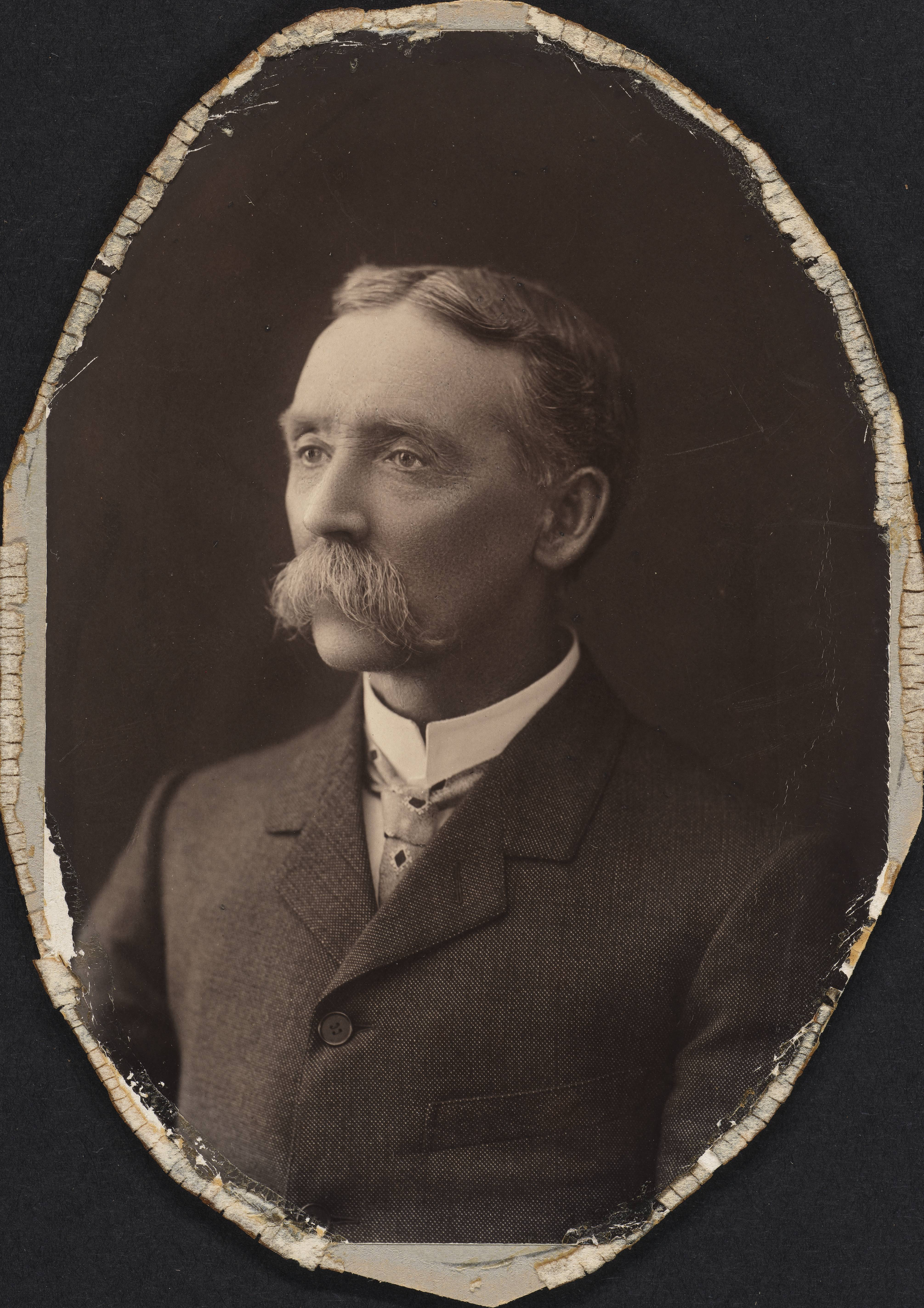
Molloy c. 1906

In 1884, Molloy was elected to the Perth City Council, where he represented the Central and West wards until 1906. In December 1891, Edward Scott resigned from the Western Australian Legislative Assembly seat of Perth, and Molloy nominated for the resulting by-election which he won against mayor Edward Keane, and was duly appointed to the vacancy on 13 January 1892. In this, he had been supported by the infant Trades and Labor Council, who were advocating electoral reform, payment of Members of Parliament, prohibition of Asian immigration and introduction of an arbitration court. Being Roman Catholic and not part of the landed classes which dominated the Parliament of that time, he proved to be somewhat populist in character, advocating universal suffrage and public ownership of power and utilities. However, he became embroiled in a controversy regarding education which split the labour movement along sectarian lines. In 1892, the Forrest government had overseen the creation of a Department of Education under ministerial control, while maintaining state aid to private schools. A National Education League led by prominent Congregationalist George Randell, led the cause against this, arguing that it was an obstacle to the creation of an efficient education system. In response, the Catholic Vicar General, Father Anselm Bourke, established the Education Defence League with the assistance of Molloy and fellow Catholic MLAs Timothy Quinlan and Alfred Canning. The issue became a major one in the 1894 election amongst the voting public, with all three MLAs losing their seats – Molloy being defeated by Randell himself.

After this loss, Molloy unsuccessfully contested the Metropolitan Province seat in the Western Australian Legislative Council in 1894, when the body became fully elective. He then attempted to re-enter Parliament on a further twelve occasions under a variety of party labels or as an independent, and then as a Nationalist Party candidate from 1917 onwards. His last effort was at a by-election for the Metropolitan Province in 1932.

He continued through this period as a Perth City councillor, serving as mayor of Perth in 1908–09 and 1911–12. He was known as something of a radical, espousing similar causes to those he had supported previously, with a notable achievement during his time as mayor being the ending of Perth Gas Company's monopoly on power and lighting in 1912. He also advocated public ownership of Perth's tramways, but was outnumbered by other councillors – transport remained in private ownership until the advent of the Metropolitan Transport Trust in 1958. He also opposed admission charges to enter public space and sporting events on the Esplanade, and supported the construction of free public baths. After 1912, he tried repeatedly to become mayor again with poor results, being labelled "too stubborn and disputatious to work with".

=== Civic and cultural life ===
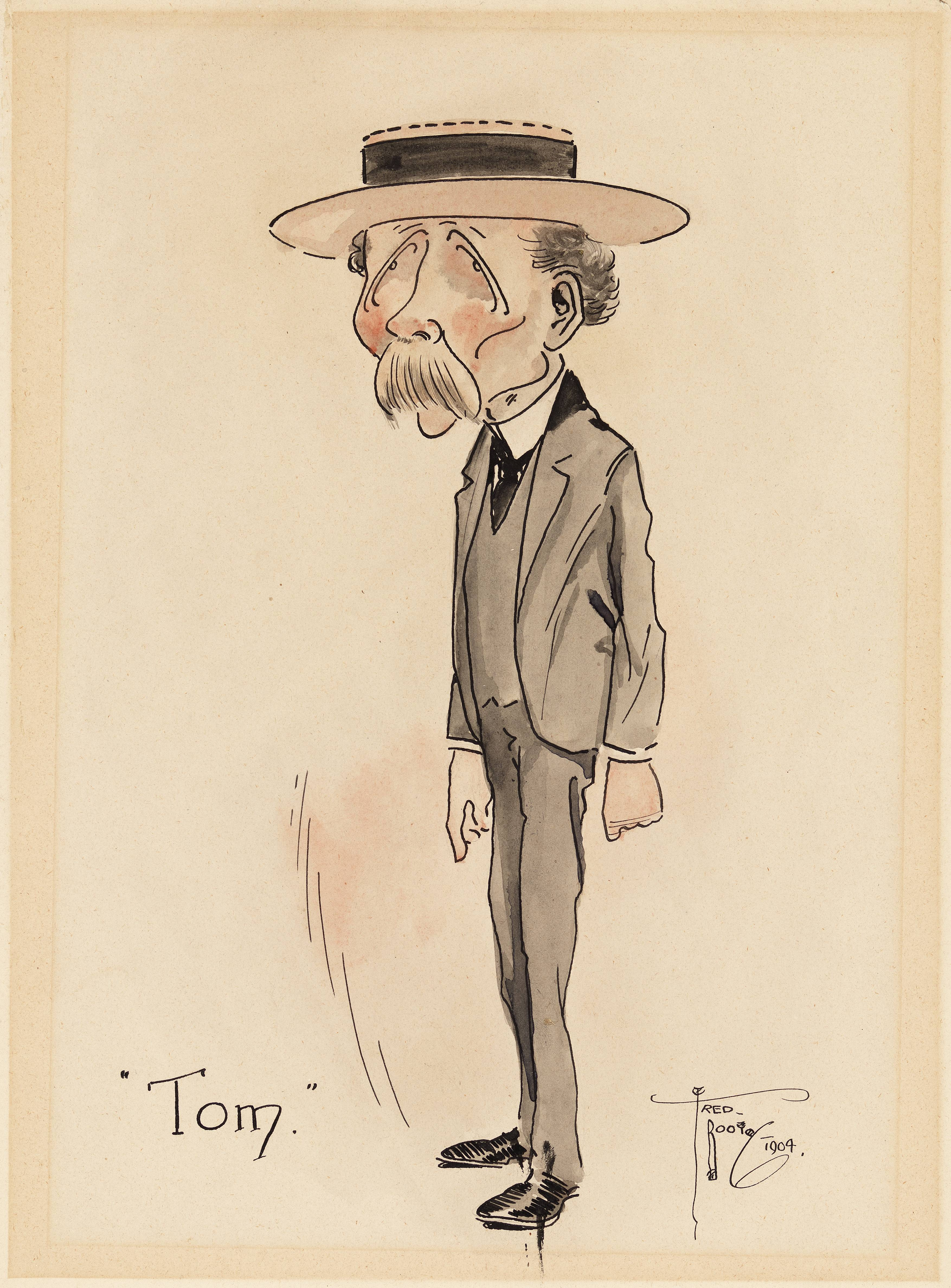
Caricature of Molloy by Frederick Francis Booty

Molloy was made a Justice of the Peace in 1895, and was appointed in 1897 to the board of trustees for the Karrakatta Cemetery. He became chairman of the board in 1924 and served in that role until 26 October 1937.

He was also instrumental in attracting finance and commissioning some of Perth's early cultural buildings. Up until the 1890s, Perth had no theatres, and actors performed in either the Perth Town Hall or in St George's Hall, described by The West Australian in 1891 as a place "where there is much that is unsuitable" and "the most significant proof of the old-time backwardness and poverty of Western Australia". At the time Western Australia had 53,177 people – a figure that was to double within the next five years. On 20 September 1893, Molloy purchased Perth Lot F3 on the south side of what is now Hay Street Mall with the assistance of Alexander Forrest, the then Mayor of Perth, and obtained a publican's licence a week later. In 1894, the Hotel Metropole was constructed on the site, and in February 1895, he announced plans for a 1,000-seat theatre to be built on land adjoining the hotel. The foundation stone was laid by Mrs A. Forrest on 8 May 1895, and the Theatre Royal opened on 19 April 1897. While its initial success was mixed, due mainly to the changing economic and demographic characteristics of Perth, by the 1930s it had become the most popular picture theatre in Perth. It eventually closed in 1977.

By 1901, Perth had become a place of optimism and confidence fuelled by the gold rush. In 1902, after the ascension of King Edward VII to the English throne, Molloy announced plans for a new theatre at Hay and King Streets, to be known as His Majesty's Theatre. It was completed at a cost of £A 63,000 (equivalent to A$11.1 million in 2022) by architect William Wolf and builder Friederich Liebe, although Liebe had to pursue Molloy (reputed to be one of the most litigious businessmen in Perth) through the courts at exorbitant costs all the way to the High Court and Privy Council for the final payment of £A 17,000 (equivalent to A$3 million in 2022). The theatre boasted the largest stage in Australia for many years, and the Heritage Council of Western Australia, which listed the building in 1999, described it as having "the most lavish and well-executed ornamentation of any Federation Free Classical theatre building in Australia".

Molloy went on to build other hotels, such as the Australia Hotel in Perth, the North Beach Hotel, the Brighton Hotel in Scarborough and the Oceanic (later Mosman Park) Hotel.

=== Later life ===
His second wife Mary died on 7 February 1925. He was created a papal knight commander of the Order of St. Gregory the Great in 1931 – given his anxiousness to become a knight, he went by the title of Sir from this point.

He died at St John of God Hospital, Subiaco, on 16 February 1938 and, after a requiem mass at St Mary's Cathedral, was buried in the Roman Catholic section of Karrakatta Cemetery. He was survived by one daughter from his second marriage.

Preceded by Sydney Stubbs	Mayor of Perth; 1908–1909	Succeeded by Richard Paul Vincent
Preceded by Richard Paul Vincent	Mayor of Perth; 1911–1912	Succeeded by John Prowse
Parliament of Western Australia
Preceded by Edward Scott	Member for Perth; 1892–1894	Succeeded by George Randell
