= Walter Dwyer =

Australian politician (1875–1950)

Sir Walter Dwyer
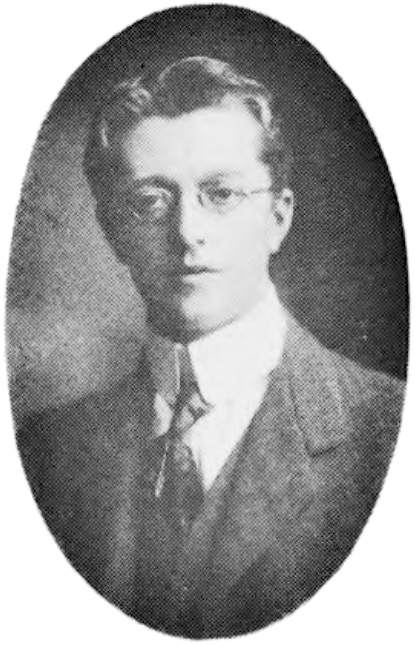

Member of the Legislative Assembly of Western Australia
- In office 3 October 1911 – 21 October 1914
- Preceded by: Harry Brown
- Succeeded by: James Connolly
- Constituency: Perth

Personal details
- Born: 27 August 1875 Carrick-on-Suir, County Tipperary, Ireland
- Died: 22 March 1950 (aged 74) Subiaco, Western Australia, Australia
- Party: Labor
- Education: University of London

Sir Walter Dwyer (27 August 1875 – 22 March 1950) was an Australian lawyer, politician, and judge. He was a member of the Legislative Assembly of Western Australia from 1911 to 1914, and later serving as the presiding judge on the State Court of Arbitration from 1926 to 1945.

== Early life ==
Dwyer was born in Carrick-on-Suir, County Tipperary, Ireland. He emigrated to Australia in 1891, and initially lived in Melbourne, where he taught at Christian Brothers College, East Melbourne. In 1895, Dwyer moved to Western Australia, where he worked as a clerk in the Education Department. He also studied law part-time, serving his articles of clerkship in Kalgoorlie, and in 1906 completed a law degree (LL.B.) with the University of London through external study. Dwyer practised law in Kalgoorlie from 1907 to 1909, and then moved to Perth. He was called to the bar in 1907. In 1915 he co-founded the firm of Dwyer Durack with J. P. Durack, father of Peter Durack.

== Politics ==
At the 1911 state election, Dwyer stood as the Labor Party candidate for the seat of Perth, having joined the party only the previous year. He defeated the sitting Liberal member, Harry Brown, becoming the first member of the Labor Party to hold the seat. While in parliament, Dwyer helped to draft legislation for the new Labor government of John Scaddan, including an industrial arbitration act, an act to protect borrowers of money, and an act to protect renters. However, he was defeated by James Connolly at the 1914 election, and subsequently returned to his legal practice. He later came to regard the loss of his seat after just a single term as a "blessing in disguise".

== Judiciary and later life ==
After leaving parliament, Dwyer developed a reputation as one of Perth's best labour lawyers. As a barrister, he appeared before the Supreme Court of Western Australia and the High Court of Australia in numerous cases. In 1916, he defended six members of the Industrial Workers of the World who had been charged with sedition. He was also a prominent Irish nationalist, and in 1919 was arrested and fined for leading a prohibited Saint Patrick's Day march. In 1926, the Labor government of Philip Collier appointed Dwyer as the new presiding judge of the State Court of Arbitration, a position which had previously only been held by justices of the supreme court. He served in the position until 1945, and developed a reputation for fairness and impartiality, with a later source describing Western Australia's lack of industrial conflict as "largely due to the confidence in the court that he had created".

Dwyer was created a Knight Bachelor in the 1949 New Year Honours. Outside of his professional career, he was a trustee of the State Library of Western Australia, the Western Australian Museum, and the Art Gallery of Western Australia. Dwyer died in Perth in March 1950, aged 74. He had married Maude Mary Smith in 1912, with whom he had two daughters.

Parliament of Western Australia
Preceded by Harry Brown	Member for Perth; 1911–1914	Succeeded by James Connolly
