= George Randell =

Australian politician (1830–1915)

The Honourable George Randell
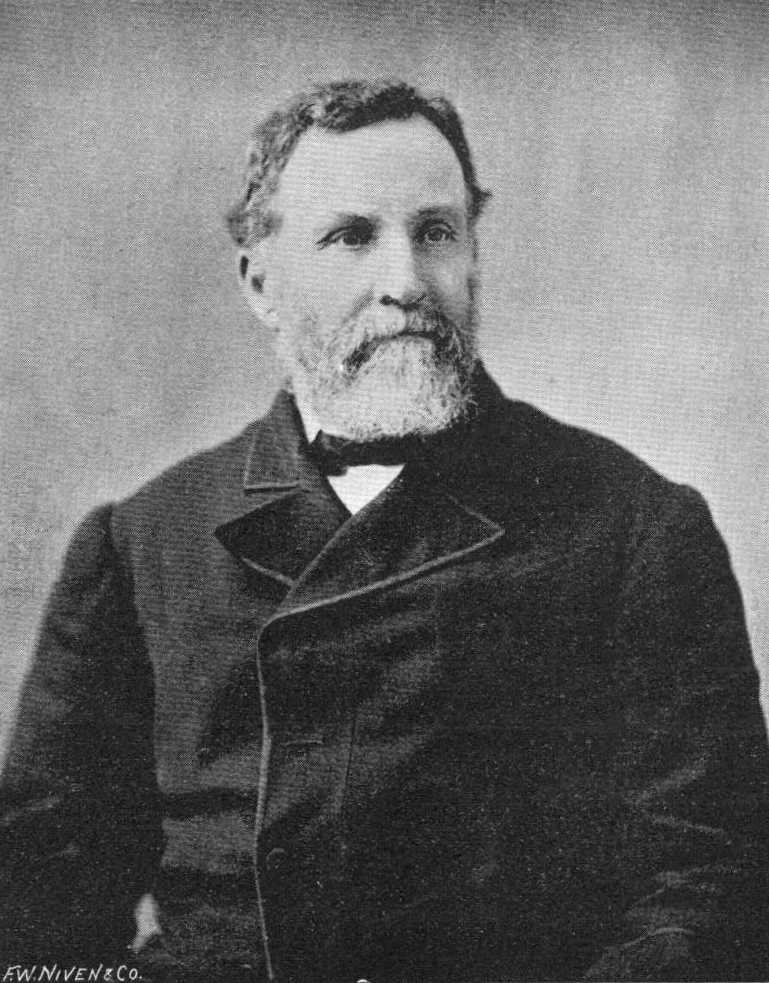

Member of the Legislative Council of Western Australia
- In office 25 January 1875 – 1 May 1878
- Preceded by: Edmund Birch
- Succeeded by: Stephen Henry Parker
- Constituency: Perth
- In office 5 July 1880 – 21 October 1890
- Preceded by: Richard Hardey
- Succeeded by: None (council reconstituted)
- Constituency: None (nominated by governor)
- In office 17 July 1893 – 16 July 1894
- Preceded by: Robert Bush
- Succeeded by: None (council reconstituted)
- Constituency: None (nominated by governor)
- In office 28 May 1897 – 21 May 1910
- Preceded by: Stephen Henry Parker
- Succeeded by: Walter Kingsmill
- Constituency: Metropolitan Province

Member of the Legislative Assembly of Western Australia
- In office 29 November 1890 – 4 July 1892
- Preceded by: None (new seat)
- Succeeded by: Henry Lefroy
- Constituency: Moore
- In office 15 June 1894 – 5 May 1897
- Preceded by: Thomas Molloy
- Succeeded by: Lyall Hall
- Constituency: Perth

Personal details
- Born: 5 October 1830 New Milton, Hampshire, England
- Died: 2 June 1915 (aged 84) West Perth, Western Australia

George Randell (5 October 1830 – 2 June 1915) was an Australian businessman and politician. He served intermittently in the Parliament of Western Australia between 1875 and 1910, including as a minister in the government of Sir John Forrest.

Born in England, Randell arrived in Western Australia in 1850, and subsequently gained prominence in Perth as a businessman. He was elected to the Perth City Council in 1870, and then to the colony's Legislative Council in 1875, where he served until 1878. He returned to the Legislative Council in 1880, as an appointee of the governor. In 1890, Randell won election to the seat of Moore in the newly created Legislative Assembly. He resigned in 1892 and was re-appointed to the Legislative Council the following year, but re-entered the Legislative Assembly at the 1894 election, winning the seat of Perth. For a time, Randell led the opposition against the Forrest government, although he eventually joined Forrest's ministry, serving as Colonial Secretary and Minister for Education from 1898 to 1901. He had left the Legislative Assembly again in 1897 to return to the Legislative Council, where he remained until his retirement in 1910.

== Biography ==
Randell was born in Milton (now New Milton), Hampshire, England, to James Randell, a cordwainer and trader, and Jane Randell. He was educated in Milton, learning blacksmithing and engineering, and by 1850 was a blacksmith in the village. He married Jane Hyde on 8 April 1850, and 19 days later, they sailed to Western Australia aboard the Sophia, arriving on 27 July 1850. Initially working as a carpenter, engineer and produce merchant, Randell founded the Perth to Fremantle paddle steamer service in 1860. From his arrival in Western Australia, he also became a mainstay of the Congregational church in Western Australia, holding every lay office over his more than sixty years of involvement. On 17 March 1868, his wife Jane, with whom he had fathered six sons (one of whom had died in infancy in 1861), died of concussion. He married Mary Louise Smith at Trinity Church, Perth, on 14 October 1869. They had two daughters and a son, Ernest Randell (who later became a noted cricketer), before Mary died on 24 August 1874. On 26 January 1881, Randell married Lucy James (née Francisco), the widow of Edward James who had died the previous year—Randell thus became the stepfather to Walter James, a future premier under responsible government in 1902–1904. In 1887, he resumed his old steamer business, but sold it in 1894 to the Swan River Shipping Company.

=== Entry into politics ===
Randell became a significant political figure in Western Australia, serving in various capacities for almost 40 years. During this time he earned a reputation as a supporter of economic liberalism, separation of church and state and secular education, among other causes. He was known for his attention to detail and his cautious and conciliatory nature, and served on many select committees and Royal Commissions.

His first involvement with politics was the Perth Municipal Council, where he became a councillor in 1870 and chairman for a term in 1874–75. He subsequently won a by-election for the Legislative Council's seat of Perth on 25 January 1875. In 1876, he campaigned successfully for the establishment of a state high school in Perth, but failed to prevent the construction of the Perth-Fremantle railway which created competition for his paddle steamer service. He sold the service, resigned his seat on the Legislative Council on 1 May 1878, and returned to England.

He returned to Perth two years later, and on 5 July 1880 was appointed to a nominative seat on the Legislative Council by the Governor, and also became a member of the Central Board of Education. Despite leading the opposition to the introduction of responsible government in 1887, Randell resigned his seat on 21 October 1890 to contest the seat of Moore in the new Legislative Assembly, which he won unopposed. He served as Chairman of Committees in the Legislative Assembly from 20 January 1891 until 4 July 1892, when he resigned his seat. During this time, he also unsuccessfully contested the mayoralty in Perth. On 17 July 1893, he was once again appointed to a nominative Legislative Council seat, which he held until nominative seats were abolished ahead of the 1894 elections.

=== The state aid issue and Opposition leadership ===
With the economy benefiting from the gold rush in the Coolgardie-Goldfields region, public attention turned to education. In 1892, the John Forrest government had overseen the creation of a Department of Education under ministerial control, while maintaining state aid to private schools—a concession to the Catholic Church, who had set up schools to provide education to their own generally working-class children. Randell was not happy with the compromise, and set up a National Education League to oppose state aid, arguing that supporting both systems with government funds was an obstacle to the creation of an efficient education system in Western Australia. In this he was supported by other abolitionists such as his stepson Walter James, by now a prominent lawyer, and former Fremantle mayor Barrington Wood, and opposed by Catholic MLAs Thomas Molloy, Timothy Quinlan and Alfred Canning. However, Randell and his supporters won at the June 1894 elections against all three, and the previously disorganised opposition to Premier Forrest rallied around him. He became Leader of the Opposition at the first parliamentary sitting on 31 July 1894.

The choice of Randell as opposition leader reflected the opposition's priorities as much as it did his own qualities—he was a conservative businessman thoroughly identified with the existing social and economic order, and welcomed by Forrest himself who believed Randell would "deal with all matters in a moderate way". In September, however, the Forrest government attempted to raise the grant to private schools. This failed when the Chairman of Committees, William Traylen, used his casting vote to break the tie and the status quo was maintained, but the secularists then moved their own motion in October calling for an end to the grant. Randell himself described state aid in the debate as "an indignity cast upon religion, and upon those who believe in religion, to have to come as paupers to this House for a grand of money for the upkeep of that with which the State has nothing whatever to do." The motion was carried, but nothing further was done until the following year.

At this time, considerable changes were going on within the opposition group. Members such as George Leake and Frederick Illingworth had moved away from Henry Lefroy's view that the opposition should not "thwart the Government, but rather unitedly assist" towards one of ultimately overthrowing the Forrest government. At the start of the next session in July 1895, Leake moved a motion of no confidence in the government's education policy. Randell believed the Government had taken the hint and would gradually move in the right direction. Forrest and his attorney-general, Septimus Burt, gave an undertaking in the debate that state aid would be terminated, and Leake dropped the motion. However, Randell was unhappy with the tactics used, and resigned the leadership to Leake, and ultimately joined the Forrest party along with other erstwhile opponents.

=== Later political life ===
Randell did not contest Perth at the 1897 elections, but on 28 May 1897 he won a Metropolitan Province seat in the Legislative Council at a by-election, which he was to hold for 13 years. From 28 April 1898 until 27 May 1901, he served as Colonial Secretary and Minister for Education in the Forrest government. During this time he initiated the Claremont Teachers College, the first in Western Australia, which opened in 1902 with Oxford graduate Cecil Andrews as principal. In 1901, the opposition to the Forrest government won office in the Legislative Assembly, and Randell's ministerial role ceased—however, he was appointed as chairman of the Perth Hospital Board, and later became a trustee under the 1904 Act which ultimately established the University of Western Australia in 1911. During this time, he also served as the Western Australian chairman of the Australian Mutual Provident Society, director of the Western Australian Bank and president of the Perth Working Men's Association.

On 27 May 1910, aged nearly 80 and thrice widowed after the death of his wife Lucy in 1897, he retired from public life, but continued his involvement with the Congregational church. He died in Havelock Street, West Perth, on 2 June 1915, and was buried in the Congregational section of Karrakatta Cemetery.

| Preceded by George Shenton | Mayor of Perth; 1884 | Succeeded by George Shenton |
Parliament of Western Australia
| Preceded by Lancel de Hamel | Leader of the Opposition; 1894–1895 | Succeeded by George Leake |
| Preceded by None | Member for Moore; 1890–1892 | Succeeded by Henry Lefroy |
| Preceded by Thomas Molloy | Member for Perth; 1894–1897 | Succeeded by Lyall Hall |
