= Ian Alexander (politician) =

Australian politician

Dr Ian Alexander

Member of the Legislative Assembly of Western Australia
- In office 9 May 1987 – 6 February 1993
- Preceded by: Terry Burke
- Succeeded by: Diana Warnock
- Constituency: Perth

Councillor, City of Perth
- In office 1982–1985

Personal details
- Born: 14 April 1947 (age 79) Leeds, Yorkshire, England
- Party: Labor (1972–1991); Greens (from 1995)
- Other political affiliations: Independent (1991–1995)
- Education: University of Western Australia (B.A., M.A.); University of London (M.Phil.); Australian National University (Ph.D.)

Ian Christopher Alexander (born 14 April 1947) is a former Australian politician who was a member of the Legislative Assembly of Western Australia from 1987 to 1993, representing the seat of Perth. He was elected as a representative of the Labor Party, but in 1991 left the party to sit as an independent.

== Early life ==
Alexander was born in Leeds, England, to Elsie Louise (née Chatterley) and Solomon Schechter Alexander. His father was a grandson of Solomon Schechter, a Romanian Jew who later became a Jewish community leader in the United States. Alexander and his family arrived in Western Australia in April 1951, where he attended Guildford Grammar School. He went on to the University of Western Australia, graduating with a Bachelor of Arts in geography in 1968 and a Master of Arts in 1970. Alexander subsequently completed a Master of Philosophy in town planning in 1972, at the University of London, and then a doctorate in urban research in 1981, at the Australian National University. Prior to entering politics, he worked as a lecturer at the Western Australian Institute of Technology (WAIT).

== Politics ==
Alexander served on the Perth City Council from 1982 to 1985. He had joined the Labor Party in 1972, and was elected to state parliament at the 1987 Perth by-election, caused by the resignation of Terry Burke. Alexander retained his seat at the 1989 state election, albeit with a significantly reduced margin. However, in March 1991 he resigned from the Labor Party to sit as an independent, citing "frequent breaches of the party's basic principles and platforms". Alexander did not contest his seat at the 1993 election, and after leaving parliament returned to work as a university lecturer at the University of Western Australia. He joined the Greens Western Australia in 1995, and at the 2001 state election unsuccessfully stood as the Greens candidate for the seat of Fremantle.

== See also ==
- Independent politicians in Australia

Parliament of Western Australia
Preceded by Terry Burke	Member for Perth; 1987–1993	Succeeded by Diana Warnock
