= Diana Warnock =

Australian politician

Diana Warnock OAM

Member of the Western Australian Legislative Assembly for Perth
- In office 6 February 1993 – 10 February 2001
- Preceded by: Ian Alexander
- Succeeded by: John Hyde

Personal details
- Born: Diana Muriel Robinson; 3 October 1940 (age 86) Perth, Western Australia
- Party: Labor Party
- Spouse: Bill Warnock
- Occupation: Radio broadcaster

Diana Muriel Warnock OAM (née Robinson; born 3 October 1940 in Western Australia) is a former Western Australian radio broadcaster, women's rights activist and state politician. She grew up in Perth, attending St Hilda's Anglican School for Girls.

Warnock worked as a journalist with the Perth Daily News, and as a radio broadcaster with 720 ABC Perth, 6PR and 6NR.

She was elected to the State Parliament as the Member for Perth in 1993, succeeding Dr Ian Alexander who had retired. She was re-elected in 1996 but did not contest the February 2001 election. Her political career was entirely from the opposition bench, during the premiership of Richard Court. Warnock served as Opposition whip, spokesperson for Multicultural and Ethnic Affairs and the Arts and spokesperson for Women's Interests and Racing & Gaming. She also served as President of the State Parliamentary Labor Party.

In 1996, Warnock and upper house MP Cheryl Davenport steered a controversial pro-choice bill through the parliament—the "Acts Amendment (Abortion) Bill", which effectively decriminalised abortion and enabled women to access abortions of pregnancies up to 20 weeks on the basis of informed consent.

In 1999 she was named the Australian Humanist of the Year by the Council of Australian Humanist Societies. As of 2013, she is the current patron of the Friends of Perth International Arts Festival.

Warnock was married to local novelist, playwright and arts patron Bill Warnock, who died in 2001.

Western Australian Legislative Assembly
Preceded by Ian Alexander	Member for Perth; 1993–2001	Succeeded by John Hyde
