= Edward Scott (Australian politician) =

British medical practitioner

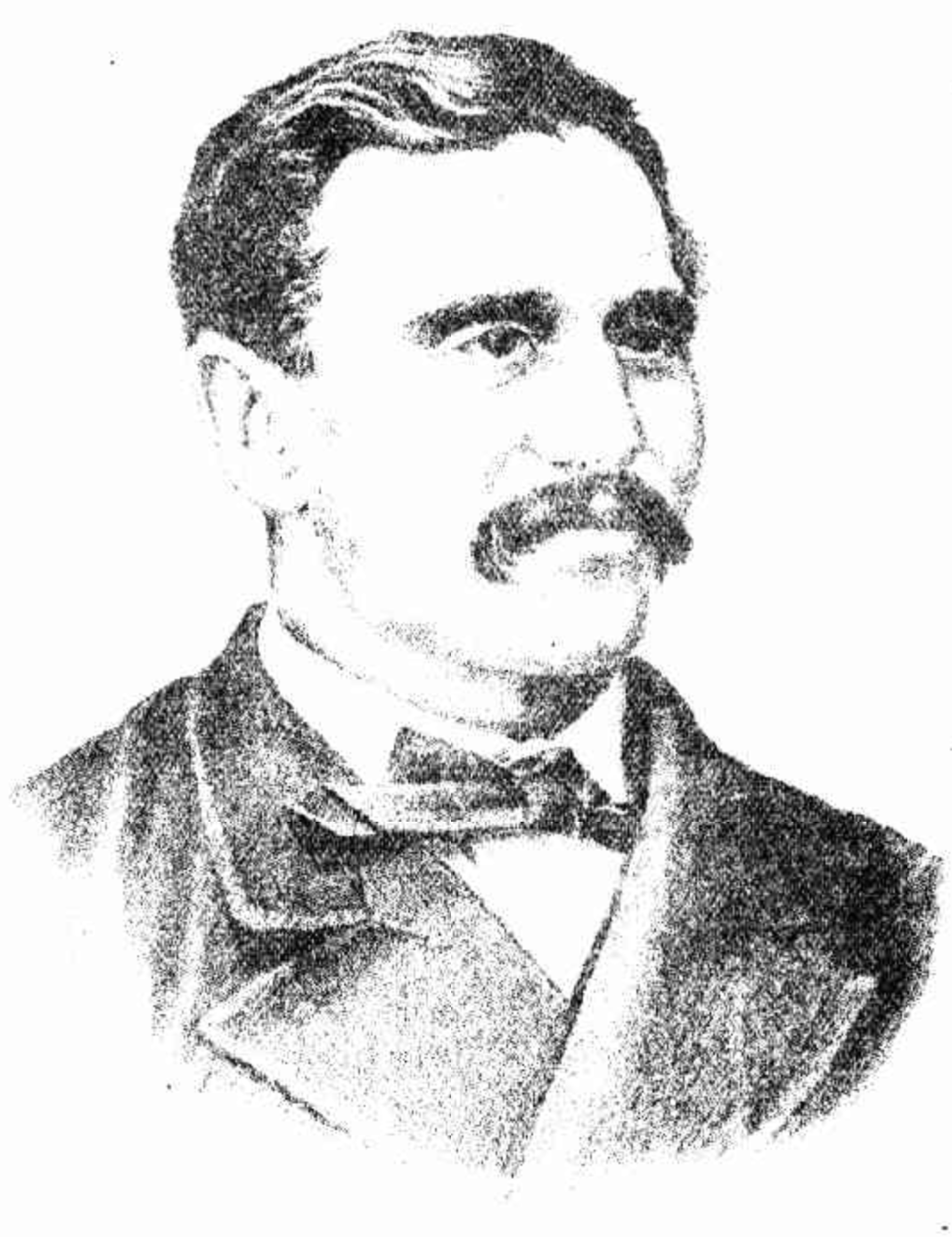
- Scott in 1888
- Succeeded by: Thomas Molloy
- Constituency: Perth

Personal details
- Born: 5 November 1852 Axmouth, Devon, England
- Died: 24 May 1920 (aged 67) Stoke Bishop, Bristol, England
- Spouse: Penelope Sholl
- Profession: Physician

Edward Scott (5 November 1852 – 24 May 1920) was an English-born politician in Western Australia. He became a member of the Legislative Council in 1886, and when representative self-government was achieved in 1890, he won the seat of Perth in the new Legislative Assembly. He was also Mayor of Perth from 1889 until 1891. A doctor by profession, he lived in Western Australia from 1875 until 1899, marrying into one of the colony's leading families and becoming involved with the socially prestigious Western Australian Turf Club.

== Biography ==
Scott was born in Axmouth, Devon, England, to John Scott, a gentleman farmer, and Anna Christiana Scott. He was educated at the nearby village of Chardstock, and then at St Thomas' Hospital in Lambeth, London, becoming a physician in 1873. He migrated to Western Australia on 27 March 1875 aboard Eulie and practised medicine at Greenough, Guildford and Perth, becoming a member of the Royal College of Surgeons in 1879. Scott was also a noted athlete, boxer, and swimmer. He also became a member of the Western Australian Turf Club, serving as a steward and then as chairman by 1890.

On 25 February 1879, he married Anne Ellen Gull née Dempster (1842–1880), the widow of Legislative Councillor Thomas Gull, at Guildford; however, she died 18 months later. On 26 April 1882, he married Penelope Fanny Sholl (1856–1929) – the daughter of Robert John Sholl (1819–86) and sister of Robert Frederick Sholl (1848–1909) – at St George's Cathedral in Perth. They had two sons and two daughters.

In February 1880 and October 1884, Scott unsuccessfully contested the Legislative Council's seat of Perth. In 1886, Scott was appointed a Justice of the Peace, and on 15 June 1886, he won Perth in a by-election, serving in that capacity until 21 October 1890. He also became the Mayor of Perth in 1889. On 10 December 1890, he became the first member of the Legislative Assembly seat of Perth. In December 1891, he completed his term as mayor and resigned his parliamentary seat, which Thomas Molloy won in a by-election on 12 January 1892. He then served as a member of the Aborigines Protection Board from 1891 until 1897.

In 1899, he returned to England and practiced medicine at Clifton, Bristol, for several years. He died at nearby Stoke Bishop on 24 May 1920.

One of his sons, Frank Sholl Scott, practised medicine in Cornwall and represented England at rugby union in 1907. Frank Sholl Scott's third son, Edward Scott, also practised medicine at St Mary's Hospital and Oxford University and represented England in rugby, for whom he gained five caps, two as captain.

Parliament of Western Australia
Preceded by None	Member for Perth; 1890–1891	Succeeded by Thomas Molloy
Preceded by George Shenton	Mayor of Perth; 1889–1891	Succeeded by Edward Keane
