= James Connolly (Australian politician) =

Australian politician (1869–1962)

The Honourable Sir James Connolly
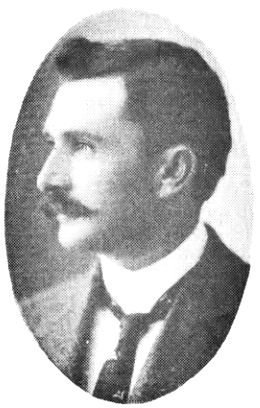

Member of the Legislative Council of Western Australia
- In office 12 June 1901 – 21 February 1914
- Preceded by: Alexander Matheson
- Succeeded by: Harry Millington
- Constituency: North-East Province

Member of the Legislative Assembly of Western Australia
- In office 21 October 1914 – June 1917
- Preceded by: Walter Dwyer
- Succeeded by: Robert Pilkington
- Constituency: Perth

Personal details
- Born: 20 December 1869 Allora, Queensland, Australia
- Died: 12 February 1962 (aged 92) London, England
- Party: Liberal

Sir James Daniel Connolly (2 December 1869 – 12 February 1962) was an Australian politician who served in both houses of the Parliament of Western Australia. He was a member of the Legislative Council from 1901 to 1914 and a member of the Legislative Assembly from 1914 to 1917, and served as a minister in the governments of Newton Moore and Frank Wilson. Connolly spent much of his later life in the United Kingdom, where he served as agent-general for Western Australia (1917 to 1923) and Malta (1929 to 1932).

== Early life ==
Connolly was born in Allora, Queensland, to Irish Catholic parents. He was initially schooled at Warwick, but later attended St Joseph's College, Brisbane, before training as a quantity surveyor. Connolly went to the Western Australian Goldfields in 1893, working as a building contractor, and in 1899 was elected to the Kalgoorlie Town Council.

== Politics ==
In 1901, Connolly stood in a by-election for the Legislative Council, and was elected to replace Alexander Matheson in North-East Province. He was appointed to the ministry in 1906, when Newton Moore replaced Hector Rason as premier, becoming Colonial Secretary and Minister for Commerce and Labour. He continued as Colonial Secretary when Frank Wilson became premier in September 1910, serving until the Wilson government lost power at the 1911 state election.

In early 1914, Connolly resigned from the Legislative Council in order to contest the Legislative Assembly at the 1914 election. He defeated the sitting Labor member, Walter Dwyer, in the seat of Perth, running for the new Liberal Party. In July 1916, Frank Wilson became premier for a second time, and Connolly was appointed an honorary minister in the new ministry.

== Later life ==
Connolly resigned from parliament in June 1917 to accept the position of Agent-General for Western Australia, representing the state government in London. Knighted in 1920 for his services, he continued as agent-general until 1923, and during his period in office assisted in the creation of the Group Settlement Scheme. Connolly was Agent-General for Malta from 1929 to 1932, and during that time helped promoted Maltese immigration to Australia. He remained in London until his death in February 1962 (aged 92), serving as a director of various companies and banks. He had married Catherine Charlotte Edwards in 1898, with whom he had five daughters.

Parliament of Western Australia
Preceded by Walter Dwyer	Member for Perth; 1914–1917	Succeeded by Robert Pilkington
Political offices
Preceded by Walter Kingsmill	Colonial Secretary; 1906–1911	Succeeded by John Drew
