= Eleni Evangel =

Australian politician

Member of the Western Australian Legislative Assembly for Perth
- In office 9 March 2013 – 11 March 2017
- Preceded by: John Hyde
- Succeeded by: John Carey

City of Perth Councillor
- In office 2005–2013

Personal details
- Born: 17 December 1965 (age 60) Perth, Western Australia, Australia
- Party: Liberal Party
- Spouse: Bill Evangel
- Children: 3 (Andria, Christos, Juliet)

Eleni Evangel is a former Australian politician who was the member for the Western Australian Legislative Assembly seat of Perth from 2013 to 2017. She was a City of Perth councillor between 2005 and 2013.

Evangel, who is of Greek descent, was born in Perth and has a teaching and television presenting background. She is the daughter of Anastasios Parissis, once a prominent nightclub and restaurant owner in Northbridge.

She was elected to the Legislative Assembly seat of Perth at the general election of 9 March 2013. She attained 48.6% of the primary vote and won on preferences. She ran again in 2017 and lost.

Western Australian Legislative Assembly
Preceded by John Hyde	Member for Perth; 2013–2017	Succeeded by John Carey
