= John Hyde (Australian state politician) =

Australian politician (born 1957)

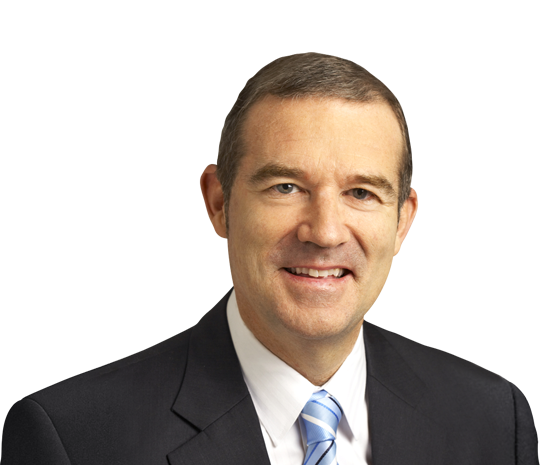

Member of the Western Australian Parliament for Perth
- In office 10 February 2001 – 9 March 2013
- Preceded by: Diana Warnock
- Succeeded by: Eleni Evangel

Mayor of the Town of Vincent
- In office 1999–2001

Personal details
- Born: John Norman Hyde; 13 October 1957 (age 68) Hamilton, Victoria
- Citizenship: Australian
- Party: Labor Party
- Relations: John Hyde (father)
- Education: Deakin University; Murdoch University
- Profession: Teacher

John Norman Hyde (born 13 October 1957 in Hamilton, Victoria) is a former politician who was a member of the Western Australian Legislative Assembly for the electoral district of Perth.

His father was Geelong and Claremont football player John Hyde.

== Political career ==
Hyde was elected to the seat in 2001 after the retirement of Diana Warnock. He was shadow minister for Local Government, Culture and the Arts, Heritage, and Citizenship and Multicultural Interests. He lost his seat in the March 2013 election.

Hyde was the first openly gay man to be elected to the Western Australian parliament. He had previously been mayor of the Town of Vincent.

Western Australian Legislative Assembly
Preceded by Diana Warnock	Member for Perth; 2001–2013	Succeeded by Eleni Evangel
