= Hyde Park, Perth =

Park in Perth, Western Australia

Hyde Park
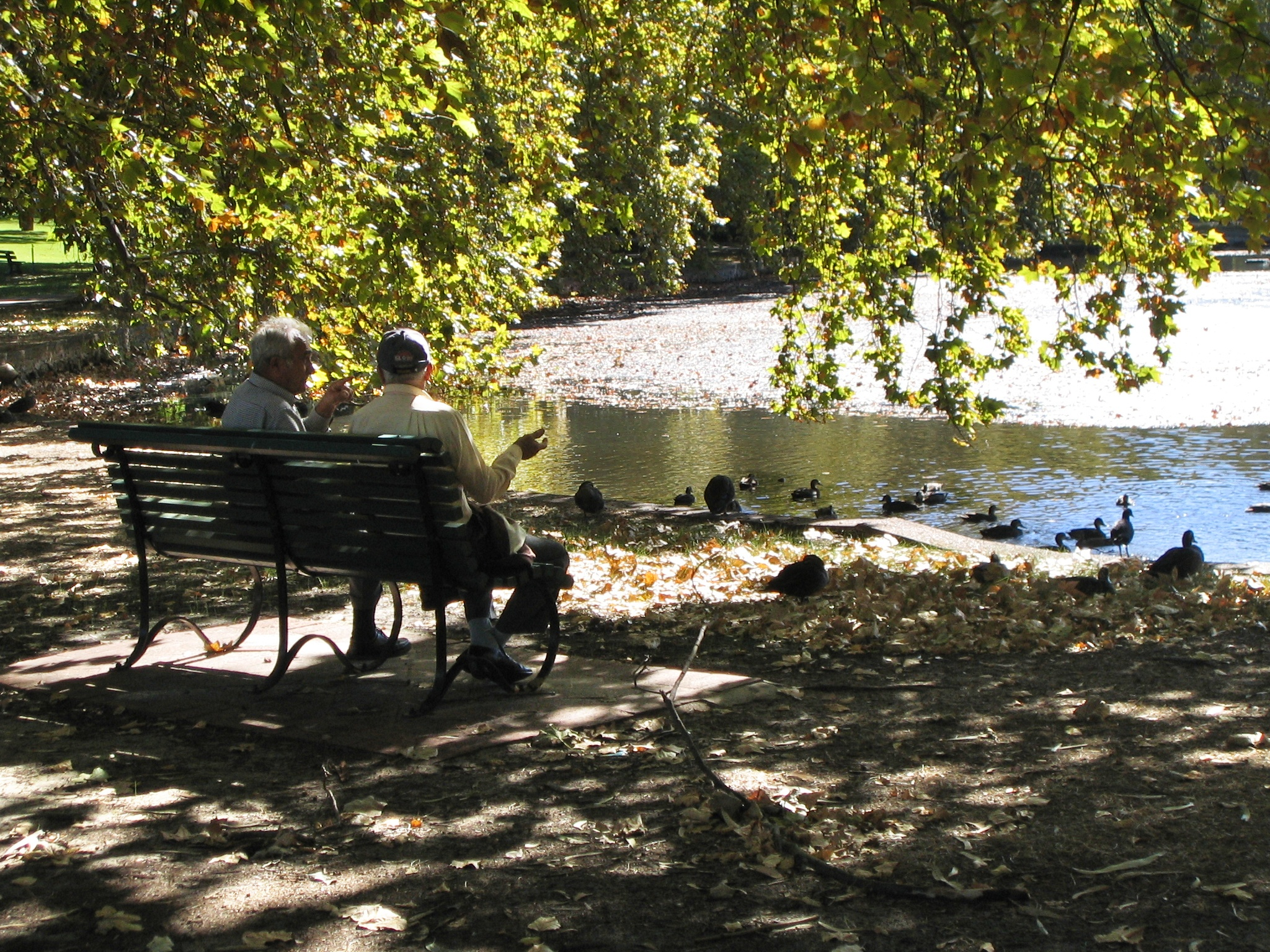
- Hyde Park is a popular meeting spot for local residents.
- Interactive map of Hyde Park
- Location: Perth, Western Australia
- Coordinates: 31°56′16″S 115°51′46″E

Western Australia Heritage Register
- Type: State Registered Place
- Designated: 30 October 1998
- Reference no.: 4634

Hyde Park (formerly Third Swamp Reserve) is an inner-city park in Perth, the state capital of Western Australia. It is located 2 kilometres (1.2 mi) north of the Perth central business district, in the northeast corner of the suburb of Perth but within the City of Vincent, bounded by Vincent, William, Glendower and Throssell streets. (Note: Strictly speaking, Perth (the suburb) lies between West Perth, North Perth and Highgate, with Vincent Street (on the north side of the park) as boundary between Perth, and North Perth and Mount Lawley.)

== Locality ==
Hyde Park has a lake feature in the middle that is separated into two basins. The park is popular with people walking, weddings, picnics and barbeques. The park has 17 zones that are available to hire for events.

== Hyde Park Fair ==
The Hyde Park Fair is held annually in the park, and is one of Perth's longest running free community events. The event was originally known as the Hyde Park Festival, and was first held in 1968. The Festival ended in 1985, but was resurrected in 1988 as the Hyde Park Fair, run by the Rotary Club of North Perth.

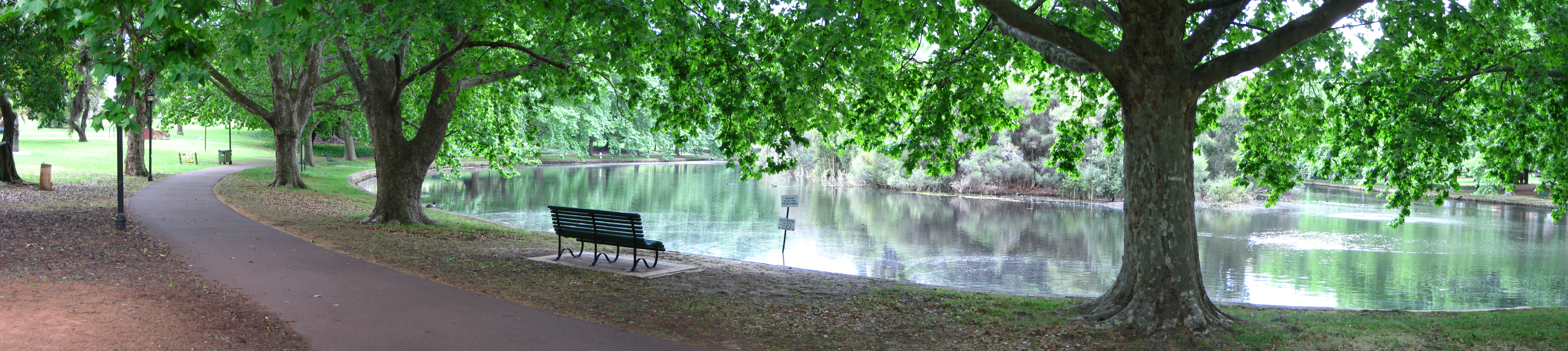
Hyde Park in 2008

== History ==
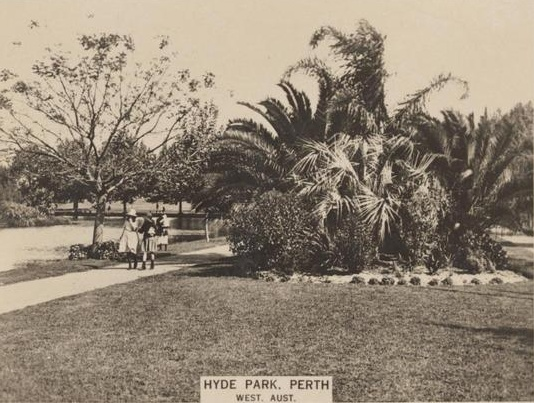
Hyde Park, 1925

Prior to European settlement, the area was known to the local Noongar people as Boodjamooling. Originally the area was approximately midway along a series of wetlands that stretched from Claisebrook Cove through to Galup and Herdsman Lake. The lakes and the area in which they resided were collectively known as the Great Lakes District. Today, only a small proportion of those wetlands remain.

After the establishment of the Swan River Colony in 1829, the European settlers gave it the name Third Swamp. In 1897, 15.5 hectares (38 acres) of Third Swamp was gazetted as a public park by Lyall Hall and two years later renamed Hyde Park.

== Hyde Park Lakes Restoration Project ==
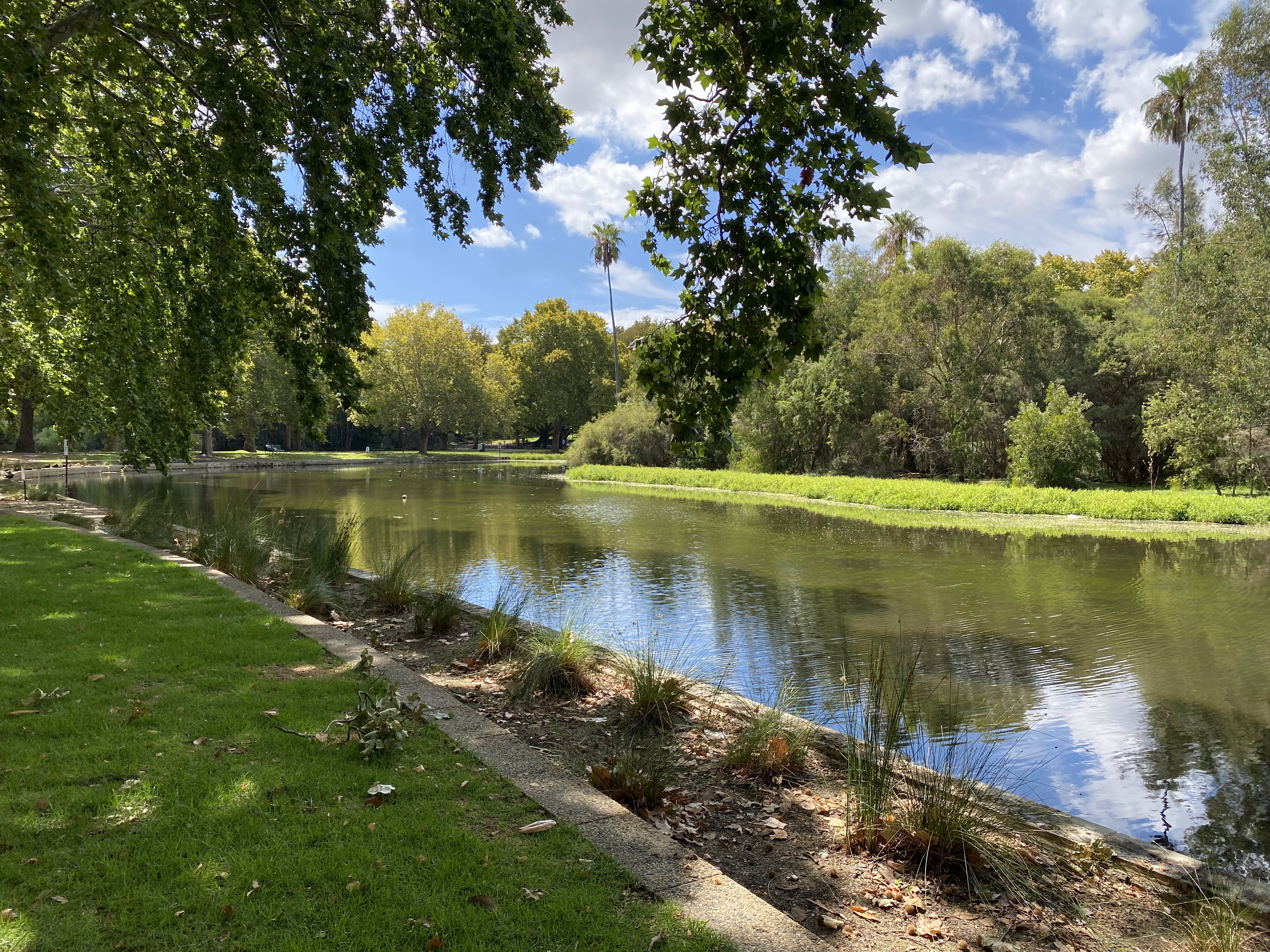
The lake in 2023

During the late 1980s, a significant level of public concern began to develop on various fronts relating mainly to the environmental health of the lakes, along with the reduction in aesthetics and negative effects to the local flora and fauna. The lakes act as a stormwater compensation basin and have been naturally recharged via groundwater seepage and stormwater run-off. The lakes were adversely affected by a changing weather pattern, hotter summers and low rainfall turning them into a sludgy swamp during the summer. This in conjunction with the pressure on scarce and finite water resources meant that a long-term viable engineered solution was required to maintain a water body year round.

After thorough investigation, a master plan was developed and the Hyde Park Lakes Restoration Project was completed in June 2012. The works help ensure the lakes provide a pristine environment year round with the addition of endemic plant species thereby providing a better habitat for the wildlife.

The existing lake wall was repaired and retained and a new lower lake wall was constructed to reduce the lakes' overall surface area by approximately 15%, designed to reduce recharge volumes and allow for better management. Vegetated beach areas were constructed (one at the causeway corner of each lake) and planted with native vegetation to assist in removing nutrients from the lake water and to address the once stagnant areas of the lakes where rubbish accumulated.

== Polyphagous shot-hole borer infestation ==
In 2025, Hyde Park was significantly impacted by an infestation of the polyphagous shot-hole borer, an invasive beetle first detected in Western Australia in 2021. On 19 May 2025, the City of Vincent launched a six-week program to remove approximately 300 heavily infested trees and shrubs from the park's two lake islands and surrounding areas, in an effort to prevent the spread of the beetle to other parts of the park, including historic Moreton Bay fig and London plane trees. Immediately following the removals, a four-year rehabilitation program for the islands began, which aims to replant over 4,000 native and borer-resilient trees and shrubs in its first year.

== Flora and fauna ==
Sloping grass areas run down to two central groundwater lakes. Shade is provided by mature introduced trees:

- Plane trees – around the lakes
- Moreton Bay figs – lawn area
- Port Jackson fig – lawn area
- Pines – around the boundary
- Jacarandas – south-east corner
- Unusual tree species: swamp cypress, red cedar, bunya pine
- Remnant indigenous tree species: Eucalyptus and Melaleuca

There are about 300 southwestern snake-necked turtles living in the park.

Several iconic plantings have occurred in Hyde Park over the years, including the avenue of London plane trees surrounding the lakes that were planted between 1897 and 1899, and the grove of jacarandas in the south east corner of the park in 1921. More recent times have seen the establishment of two native garden beds on the northern side of the park around a stand of original jarrah trees.

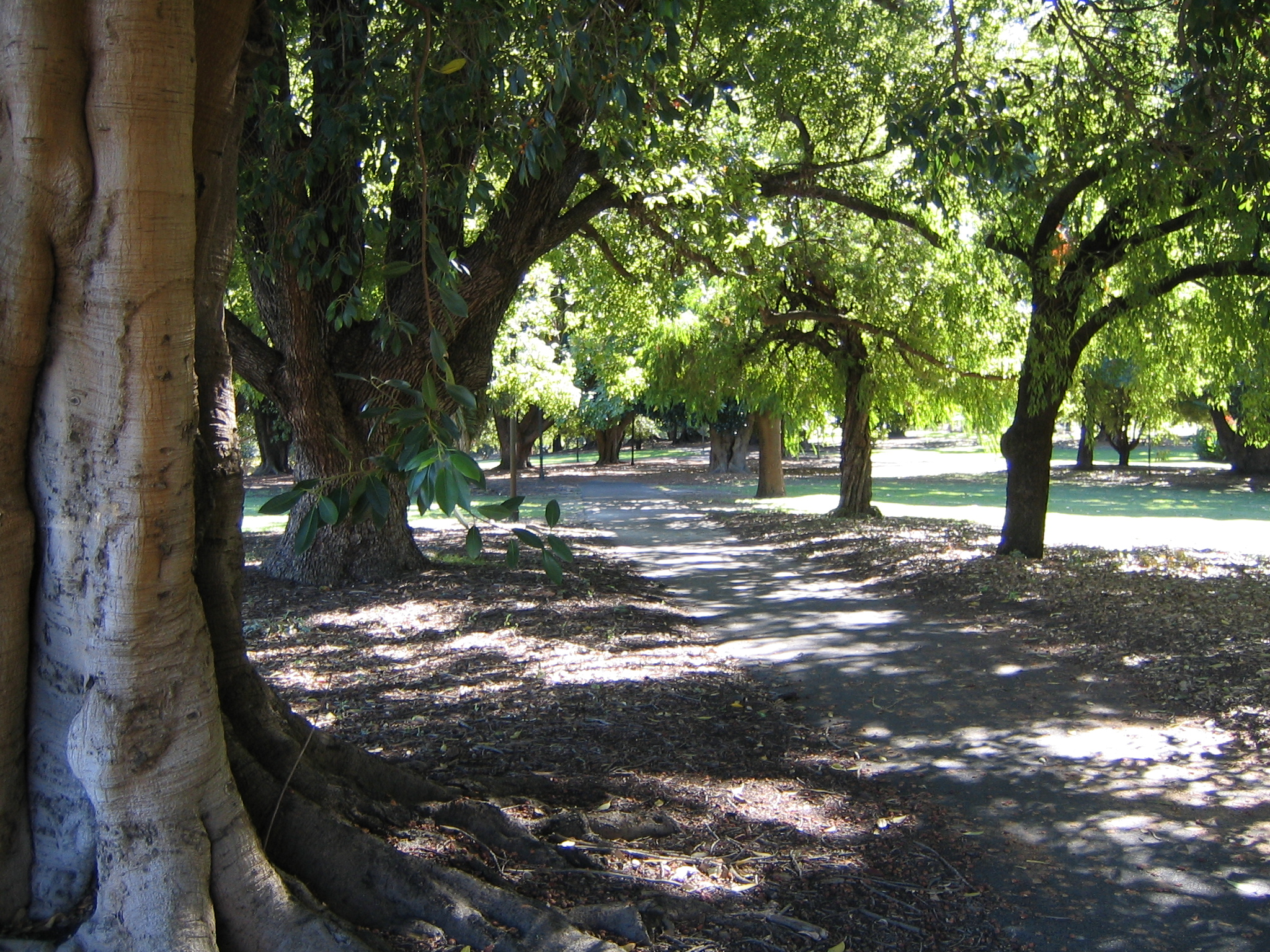
Moreton Bay figs

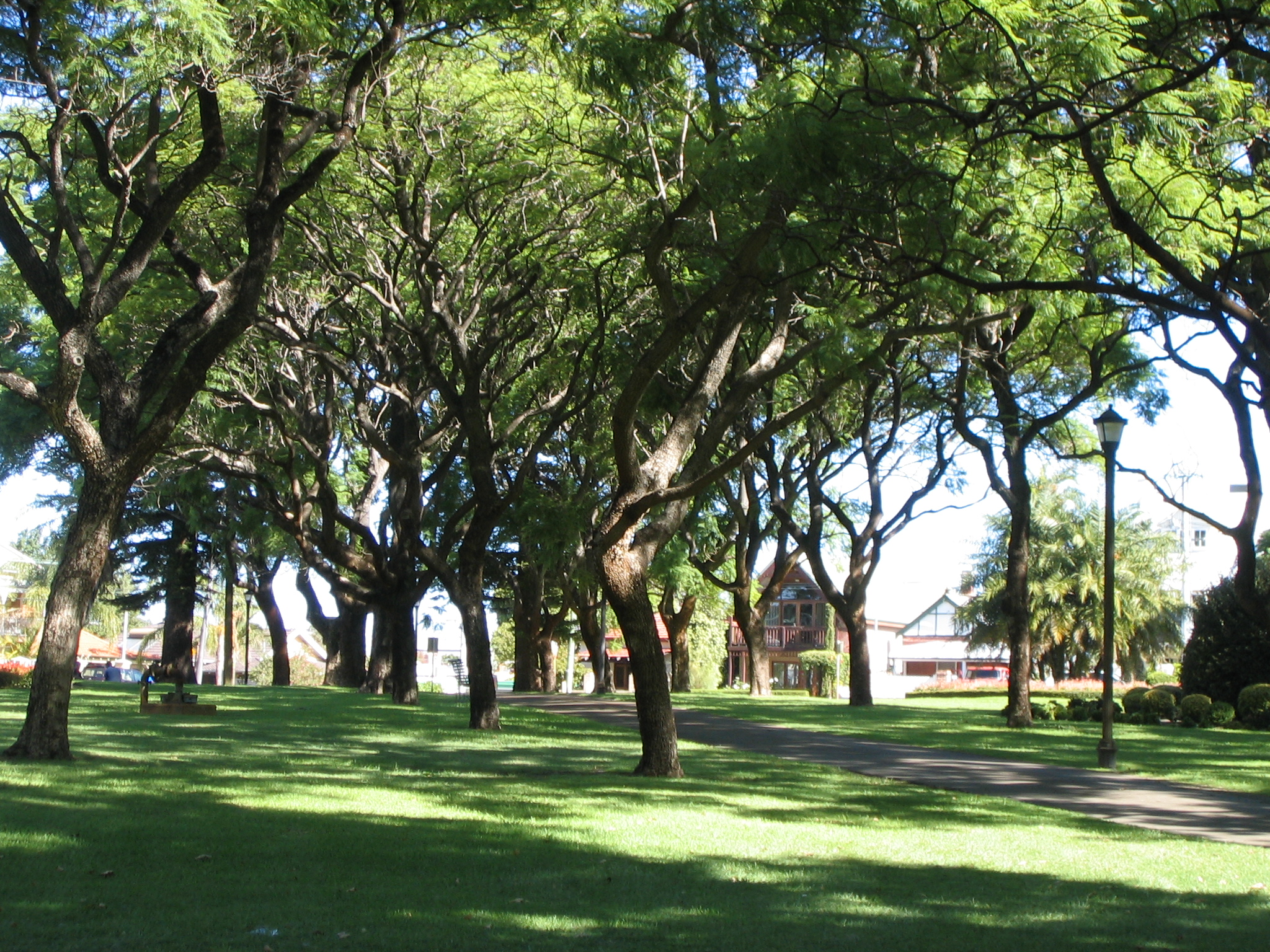
Jacarandas

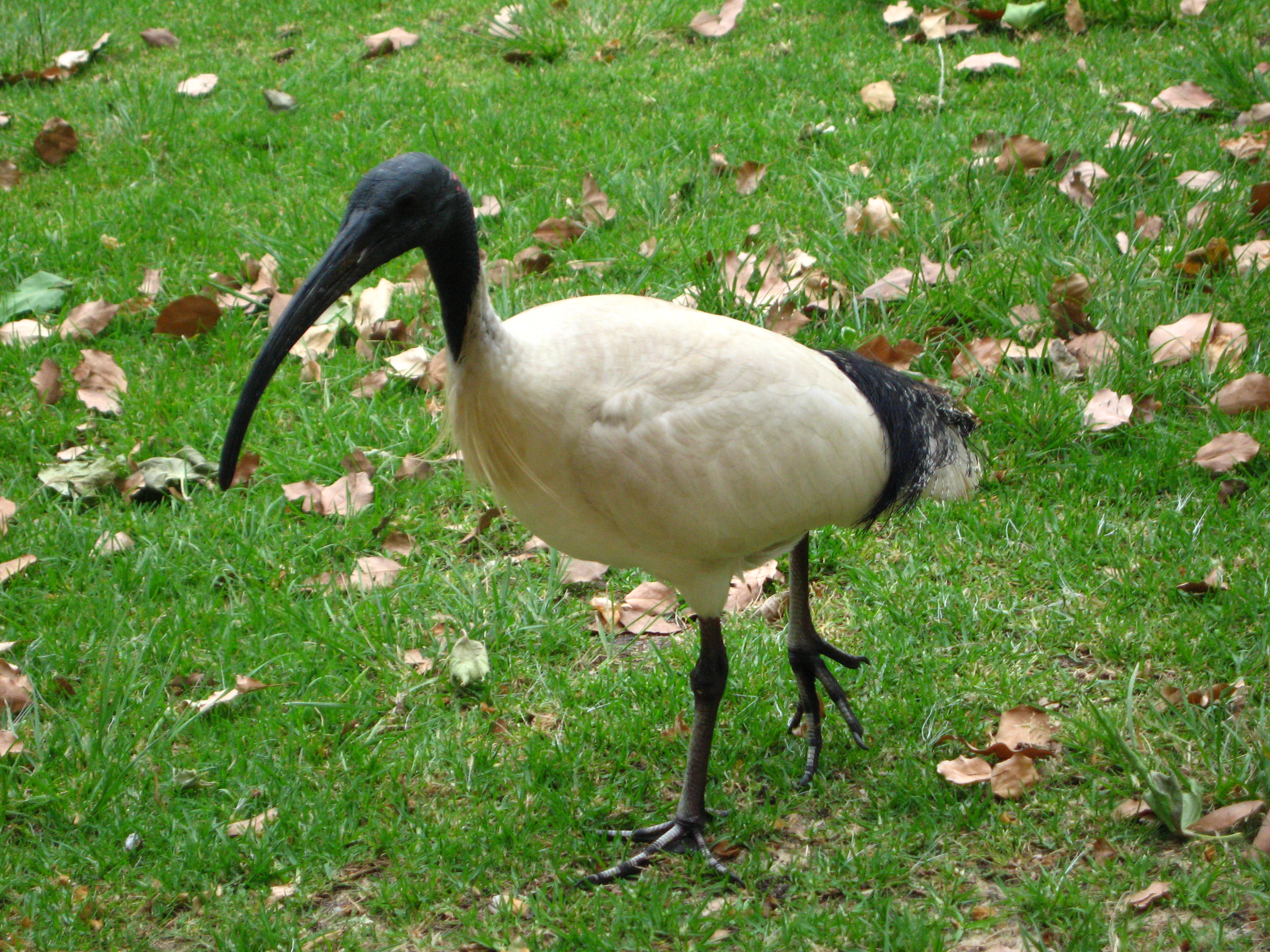
Australian white ibis

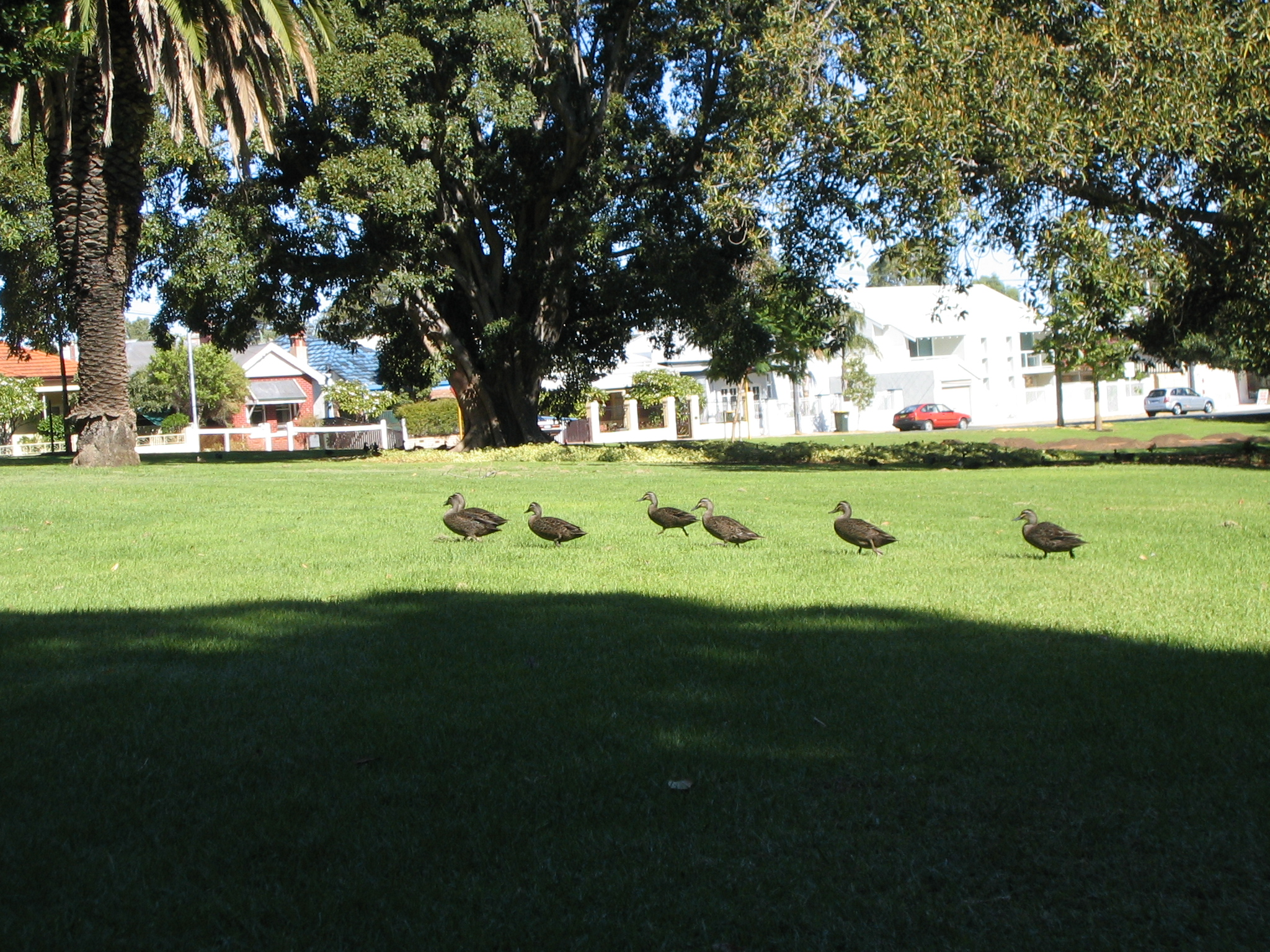
Ducks on the lawn area

== Facilities ==
Facilities in Hyde Park include public toilets, playground equipment, barbecues, drinking fountains, pavilion, stage area, fitness equipment and a sealed walking path about 800 metres (2,600 ft) long encircling the lake. Electricity is available, which is used for example to power temporary fairground rides.
