= Robert Pilkington (politician, born 1870) =

Australian politician

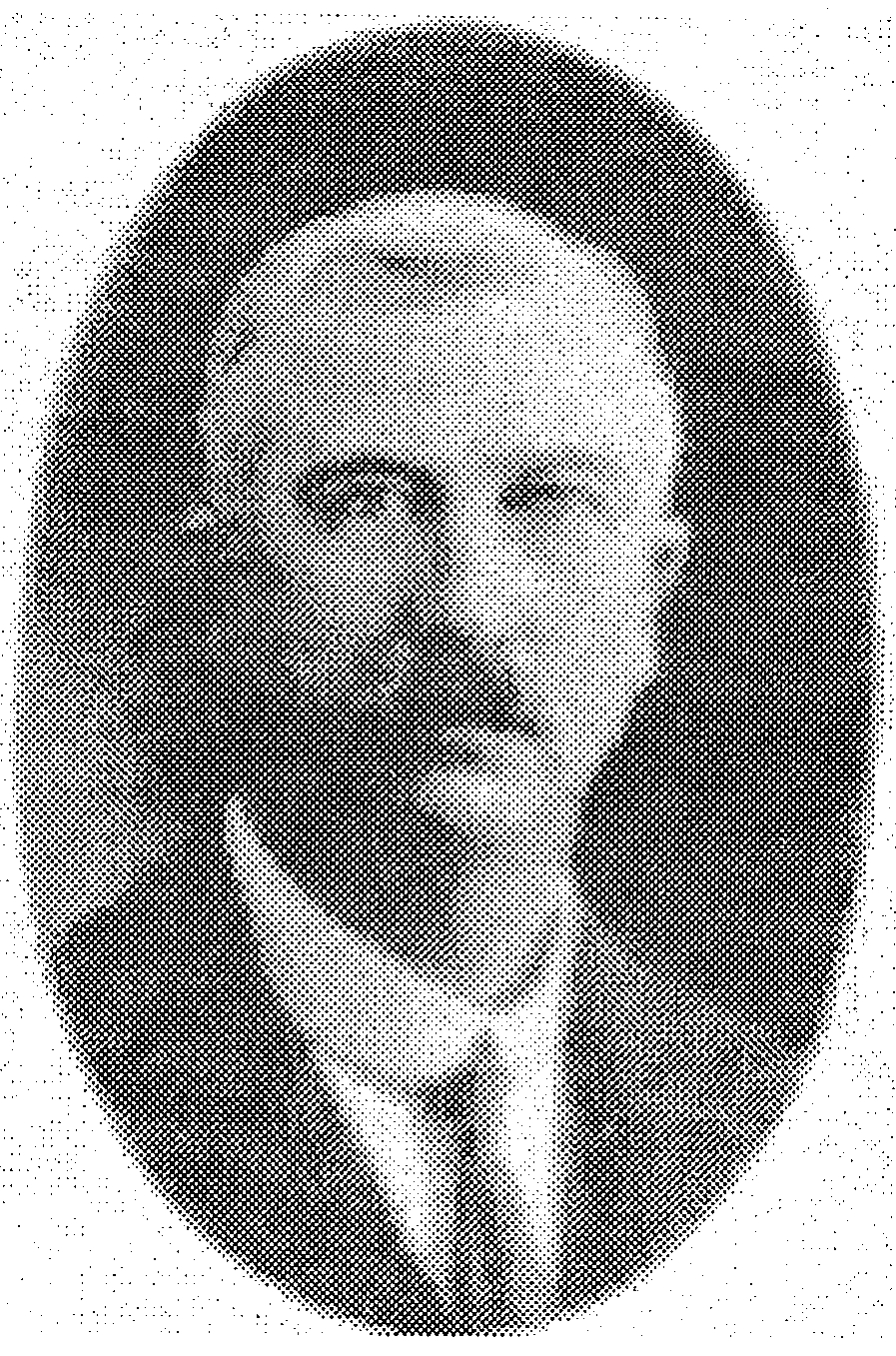
Robert Pilkington

Robert Rivington Pilkington (8 February 1870 – 30 June 1942) was an Irish politician who sat in the Western Australian Legislative Assembly and the British House of Commons.

Robert Pilkington was born in Dublin, Ireland in 1870. He was educated at Uppingham and Pembroke College, Cambridge, attaining a Bachelor of Arts before being called to the bar at Lincoln's Inn in 1893.

In 1894, Pilkington emigrated to Western Australia. He practiced law initially at York in 1895, and then at Perth. He returned to Ireland in 1899, marrying Ethel Longworth-Dames there on 13 December; they had one daughter before her death in 1920. After returning to Perth, Pilkington was made a King's Counsel in 1906, and practiced in partnership with Walter James from 1907.

On 22 July 1917, Pilkington was elected to the Legislative Assembly seat of Perth in a by-election occasioned by the resignation of James Connolly, who had been appointed Agent-General for Western Australia in London. He held the seat until the election of 12 March 1921, when he did not contest the seat. Victor Courtney somewhat uncharitably described him as "a tall, austere, aloof English lawyer... quite out of touch with public opinion... He was a dyed-in-the-wool conservative and did not care who knew. I name him as the giver of the most tactless answer to a questioner I have ever heard".

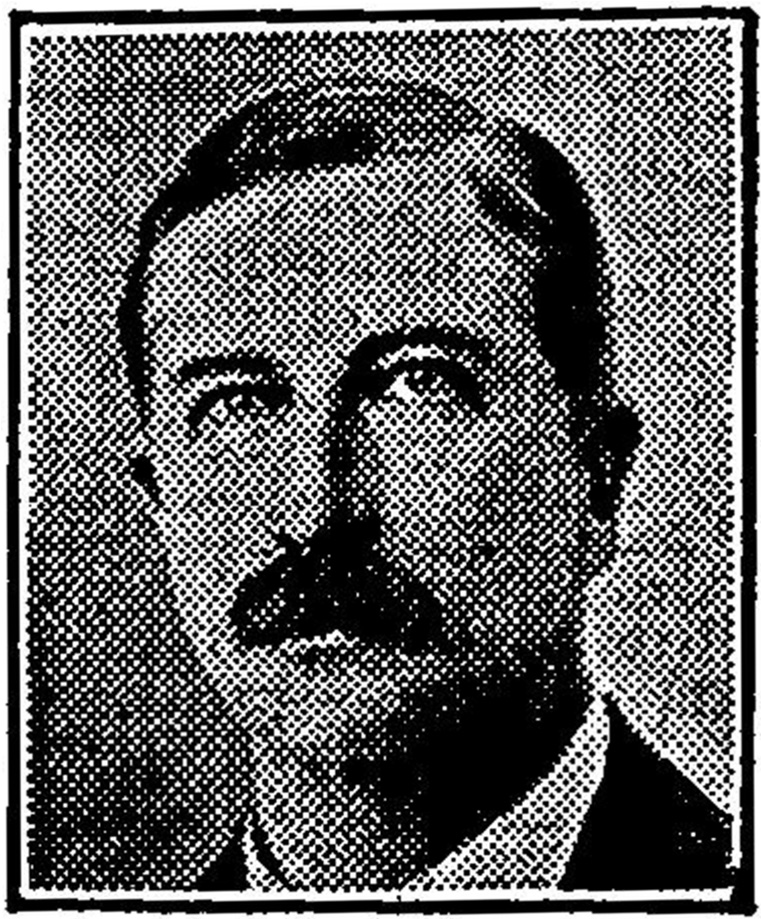
Robert Pilkington

Pilkington returned to England later in 1921, and at the 1922 general election he stood unsuccessfully as a Liberal Party candidate for the two-member House of Commons constituency of Dundee. Pilkington was nominated to oppose Winston Churchill by a rebel group of Liberals including Garnet Wilson. At the 1923 general election he won the seat of Keighley in West Yorkshire, but did not stand again at the 1924 general election.

He died at Wimbledon, England, on 30 June 1942, and was cremated at Putney Vale Cemetery.

Parliament of the United Kingdom
Preceded by Hastings Lees-Smith	Member of Parliament for Keighley; 1923–1924	Succeeded by Hastings Lees-Smith
