= Anselm Bourke =

Mgr Anselm Bourke, born Nicholas Bourke, (Dublin, 10 September 1835 – West Perth, 2 June 1924) was a Roman Catholic priest of Irish origins. He was prominent in Catholic education for several decades, and also founded the West Perth (now Northbridge) parish of the Church in 1901. He made his profession as a Benedictine monk in 1858, but got dispensation from his monastic vows from the Vatican in 1871; therefore, he cannot be called a Benedictine.

He was still studying to become a priest of the Benedictine order when he arrived in Western Australia on 24 May 1855 aboard the Lady Amhurst with the Spanish Benedictine Father José María Benito Serra OSB -also known as Joseph Serra in Western Australia-, and several other clergymen, mostly Spaniards, but also Irish and French. He made his religious profession on 26 July 1858, and completed his education and was ordained in 1859.

In 1860, Bourke was appointed to teach at the Roman Catholic boys' schools at Fremantle and Perth, where he became known as an able scholar and teacher. In 1864, he was appointed the first parish priest of York—prior to this, the parish had been administered by priests from Toodyay and New Norcia. He lived in simple quarters at the rear of the church and conducted Mass every Sunday. During his time in York, he employed ten ticket of leave men, including three as teachers.

Returning to Perth in 1870, he became the chaplain of Fremantle Prison, and taught at various schools. He got dispensation from his monastic vows on 30 April 4, 1871, but his name would still be the one he used in his profession, for which he was known in the Colony, not his birth one.

The troublesome years of Bourke, his erratic behaviour and apparent mental problems, his difficult disengagement from the Benedictines and from New Norcia, as well as his temporary exile from Western Australia, ignored by most scholars until now, are mentioned by Dr. Teresa De Castro.

In 1885, he became the first resident priest of the Vasse region at Busselton. In 1889, on returning to Perth, he became Vicar General for Western Australia serving under Bishop Matthew Gibney, and served voluntarily as New Norcia's agent in Perth, and canvassed the Government for a Roman Catholic representative on the Education Board.

He also became active in the debate over state aid to private schools, which had existed since 1871 and had become central to the public debate leading to the June 1894 elections in Western Australia. With the help of three Catholic members of the Legislative Assembly, he founded the Education Defence League to lobby for the continuation of state aid. The normally mild-mannered priest caused some sensation at a public meeting prior to the election by suggesting violence would result if state aid were lifted. The battle was ultimately lost—the MPs who had supported him lost their seats at the election, and in late 1895 the Government passed a bill bringing the funding arrangement to an end.

In August 1894, he resigned as Vicar General, desiring to retire to New Norcia, but changed his mind thereafter, deciding that the number of Catholics arriving in Western Australia due to the gold rush and the cause of maintaining the private schools justified his continued presence. He became Chairman of the Education Board, a position which he held for a number of years. He was also a patron and benefactor of the Sisters of Mercy and financed St Mary's in Leederville and St Brigid's in West Perth, apparently from his own funds. He became a Monsignor in 1898 and the inaugural parish priest for West Perth in 1901, residing in the Presbytery of St Brigid's in Fitzgerald Street for the rest of his life. He also became involved with the foundation of the University of Western Australia.

He died in West Perth in 1924.

The Archives of New Norcia keeps an important group of letters addressed from Bourke to the superiors of the monastery, especially to Bishop Rosendo Salvado OSB. Those offer a real portray of Bourke's personality, personal troubles, opinions and interests on relevant matters for his time. This information is completed by the many references to Bourke found in other letters kept in New Norcia Archives, especially in the correspondence between Bishop Martin Griver and Bishop Rosendo Salvado.
