= William Purkiss =

Australian politician

- Constituency: Perth

Personal details
- Born: 1844 Hobart, Tasmania
- Died: 8 August 1906 (aged 61–62) Perth, Western Australia
- Spouse: Julia Hawkins
- Profession: Solicitor

William Morton Purkiss (1844–8 August 1906) was a Member of the Western Australian Legislative Assembly from 1901 to 1904.

Born in Hobart, Tasmania in 1844, Purkiss was the son of draper William Morton Purkiss and Ann Jean née Walker. He was educated at Horton College in the town of Ross, then emigrated to New Zealand in 1867. On 1 January 1873 he married Julia Emma Hawkins at Hokitika, New Zealand; they had three sons and a daughter. After qualifying as a solicitor, Purkiss became Crown Prosecutor and later Crown Solicitor of Westland Province. He also contested the seat of Westland in a New Zealand election, but was unsuccessful.

In 1894, Purkiss emigrated to Perth, Western Australia, where he worked as a solicitor. He was admitted to the bar in 1895, then went into partnership with Richard Haynes. On 6 December 1901 he was elected to the Legislative Assembly seat of Perth, defeating Frank Wilson in a ministerial by-election. He held the seat until the election of 28 June 1904, which he did not contest.

Purkiss retired from practice in 1905, and the following January was appointed Judicial Commissioner for the North West. He died in Perth Hospital on 8 August 1906, and was buried in Karrakatta Cemetery.
