= Electoral results for the district of Swan =

Western Australian district election results

This is a list of electoral results for the Electoral district of Swan in Western Australian state elections.

== Members for Swan ==
Swan (1890–1950)
Member	Party	Term
William Loton	None	1890–1897
Norman Ewing	Independent	1897–1901
Mathieson Jacoby	Independent	1901–1905
Arthur Gull	Ministerial	1905–1908
Mathieson Jacoby	Ministerial	1908–1911
Philip Turvey	Labor	1911–1914
William Ralph Nairn	Liberal	1914–1917
William Ralph Nairn	Nationalist	1917–1921
Richard Sampson	Country	1921–1923
Richard Sampson	Country (MCP)	1923–1924
Richard Sampson	Nationalist	1924–1931
Richard Sampson	Country	1931–1944
Ray Owen	Independent Country	1944–1947
Gerald Wild	Liberal	1947–1949
Gerald Wild	Liberal Country League	1949–1950
Swan (1962–1983)
Member	Party	Term
John Brady	Labor	1962–1974
John Skidmore	Labor	1974–1982
Gordon Hill	Labor	1982–1983

== Election results ==
=== Elections in the 1980s ===
1982 Swan state by-election
Party	Candidate	Votes	%	±%
Labor	Gordon Hill	7,491	59.9	+1.9
Liberal	Richard Reynolds	3,962	31.7	−4.1
Democrats	Ramsay Bogunovich	1,055	8.4	+8.4
Total formal votes		12,508	97.5	+1.7
Informal votes		319	2.5	−1.7
Turnout		12,827	75.5	−13.5
Labor hold		Swing	N/A	

- Preferences were not distributed.

1980 Western Australian state election: Swan
Party	Candidate	Votes	%	±%
Labor	Jack Skidmore	8,737	58.0	+2.0
Liberal	John George	5,387	35.8	−8.2
National Country	Howard Wilcockson	737	4.9	+4.9
Independent	Howard Bowra	195	1.3	+1.3
Total formal votes		15,056	95.8	−0.1
Informal votes		663	4.2	+0.1
Turnout		15,719	89.0	−1.6
Two-party-preferred result
Labor	Jack Skidmore	8,967	59.6	+3.6
Liberal	John George	6,089	40.4	−3.6
Labor hold		Swing	+3.6	

=== Elections in the 1970s ===
1977 Western Australian state election: Swan
Party	Candidate	Votes	%	±%
Labor	Jack Skidmore	7,831	56.0	
Liberal	Peter Unger	6,143	44.0	
Total formal votes		13,974	95.9	
Informal votes		604	4.1	
Turnout		14,578	90.6	
Labor hold		Swing	−6.4	

1974 Western Australian state election: Swan
Party	Candidate	Votes	%	±%
Labor	Jack Skidmore	9,021	63.0	
Liberal	Douglas Ismail	4,244	29.6	
National Alliance	Pietro Bendotti	1,052	7.4	
Total formal votes		14,317	93.9	
Informal votes		926	6.1	
Turnout		15,243	89.6	
Two-party-preferred result
Labor	Jack Skidmore	9,179	64.1	
Liberal	Douglas Ismail	5,138	35.9	
Labor hold		Swing		

1971 Western Australian state election: Swan
Party	Candidate	Votes	%	±%
Labor	John Brady	9,923	75.5	+4.5
Democratic Labor	Paul McLaughlin	3,214	24.5	+24.5
Total formal votes		13,137	94.5	−3.3
Informal votes		761	5.5	+3.3
Turnout		13,898	91.4	−0.9
Labor hold		Swing	N/A	

=== Elections in the 1960s ===
1968 Western Australian state election: Swan
Party	Candidate	Votes	%	±%
Labor	John Brady	7,852	71.0	
Liberal and Country	John Pitsikas	3,201	29.0	
Total formal votes		11,053	97.8	
Informal votes		250	2.2	
Turnout		11,303	92.3	
Labor hold		Swing		

1965 Western Australian state election: Swan
Party	Candidate	Votes	%	±%
Labor	John Brady	6,863	66.3	−25.5
Liberal and Country	Lindsay Ellis	3,208	31.0	+31.0
Communist	Gordon Murray	284	2.7	−5.5
Total formal votes		10,355	95.6	+3.5
Informal votes		474	4.4	−3.5
Turnout		10,829	92.6	−1.5
Two-party-preferred result
Labor	John Brady	7,119	68.7	−23.1
Liberal and Country	Lindsay Ellis	3,236	36.3	+36.3
Labor hold		Swing	N/A	

1962 Western Australian state election: Swan
Party	Candidate	Votes	%	±%
Labor	John Brady	8,962	91.8	
Communist	Gordon Murray	805	8.2	
Total formal votes		9,767	92.5	
Informal votes		795	7.5	
Turnout		10,562	94.1	
Labor hold		Swing		

=== Elections in the 1940s ===
1947 Western Australian state election: Swan
Party	Candidate	Votes	%	±%
Liberal	Gerald Wild	2,765	44.8	+44.8
Independent	Ray Owen	2,653	43.0	+43.0
Country	Edward Parker	751	12.2	−50.5
Total formal votes		6,169	97.0	+0.6
Informal votes		193	3.0	−0.6
Turnout		6,362	85.4	−7.6
Two-candidate-preferred result
Liberal	Gerald Wild	3,135	50.8	+50.8
Independent	Ray Owen	3,034	49.2	+49.2
Liberal gain from Country		Swing	N/A	

- Swan was won in a by-election by Independent candidate Ray Owen upon the death of sitting Country member Richard Sampson.

1944 Swan state by-election
Party	Candidate	Votes	%	±%
Labor	Owen Hanlon	1,488	28.8	–8.5
Independent Country	Ray Owen	1,377	26.6	+26.6
Independent Country	Howard Sampson	988	19.1	+19.1
Country	Hurtle Prater	563	10.9	–51.8
Independent	John Thomas	465	9.0	+9.0
Nationalist	Herbert Yelland	288	5.6	+5.6
Total formal votes		5,169	96.9	+0.5
Informal votes		165	3.1	–0.5
Turnout		5,334	80.4	–12.6
Two-candidate-preferred result
Independent Country	Ray Owen	3,099	60.0	+60.0
Independent Country	Howard Sampson	2,070	40.0	+40.0
Independent Country gain from Country		Swing	n/a	

1943 Western Australian state election: Swan
Party	Candidate	Votes	%	±%
Country	Richard Sampson	3,583	62.7	+16.8
Labor	Owen Hanlon	2,128	37.3	+5.8
Total formal votes		5,711	96.4	−1.5
Informal votes		215	3.6	+1.5
Turnout		5,926	93.0	+3.4
Country hold		Swing	+0.7	

=== Elections in the 1930s ===
1939 Western Australian state election: Swan
Party	Candidate	Votes	%	±%
Country	Richard Sampson	2,447	45.9	−54.1
Labor	Harold Larwood	1,676	31.5	+31.5
Ind. Nationalist	George North	1,206	22.6	+22.6
Total formal votes		5,329	97.9	
Informal votes		115	2.1	
Turnout		5,444	89.6	
Two-party-preferred result
Country	Richard Sampson	3,306	62.0	−38.0
Labor	Harold Larwood	2,023	38.0	+38.0
Country hold		Swing	N/A	

1936 Western Australian state election: Swan
Party	Candidate	Votes	%	±%
Country	Richard Sampson	unopposed		
Country hold		Swing		

1933 Western Australian state election: Swan
Party	Candidate	Votes	%	±%
Country	Richard Sampson	2,731	65.8	−34.2
Nationalist	William Orr	1,421	34.2	+34.2
Total formal votes		4,051	97.6	
Informal votes		101	2.4	
Turnout		4,253	89.3	
Country gain from Nationalist		Swing	N/A	

- Richard Sampson was the sitting member for Swan that changed from the Nationalist to the Country party for this election.

1930 Western Australian state election: Swan
Party	Candidate	Votes	%	±%
Nationalist	Richard Sampson	unopposed		
Nationalist hold		Swing		

=== Elections in the 1920s ===
1927 Western Australian state election: Swan
Party	Candidate	Votes	%	±%
Nationalist	Richard Sampson	2,395	61.6	+3.7
Labor	Charles Huntley	1,495	38.4	−3.7
Total formal votes		3,890	99.1	−0.1
Informal votes		35	0.9	+0.1
Turnout		3,925	71.7	+2.2
Nationalist hold		Swing	+3.7	

1924 Western Australian state election: Swan
Party	Candidate	Votes	%	±%
Country	Richard Sampson	1,875	57.9	+27.6
Labor	William Logie	1,362	42.1	+12.1
Total formal votes		3,237	99.2	+1.5
Informal votes		25	0.8	−1.5
Turnout		3,262	69.5	+1.8
Country hold		Swing	−1.0	

1921 Western Australian state election: Swan
Party	Candidate	Votes	%	±%
Country	Richard Sampson	725	30.3	+30.3
Labor	John Holman	719	30.0	+30.0
Nationalist	Caryl Molyneux	301	12.6	−34.0
Country	George Wilson	268	11.2	+11.2
Independent	Neil Dungey	327	3.7	+3.7
Nationalist	Fred Serisier	53	2.2	+2.2
Total formal votes		2,393	97.7	−1.8
Informal votes		56	2.3	+1.8
Turnout		2,449	67.7	+9.7
Two-party-preferred result
Country	Richard Sampson	1,409	58.9	+58.9
Labor	John Holman	984	41.1	+41.1
Country gain from Nationalist		Swing	N/A	

=== Elections in the 1910s ===
1917 Western Australian state election: Swan
Party	Candidate	Votes	%	±%
National Liberal	William Nairn	1,004	53.4	+12.3
Nationalist	Thomas Ilbery	876	46.6	+32.0
Total formal votes		1,880	99.5	+1.1
Informal votes		10	0.5	–1.1
Turnout		1,890	58.0	–9.5
National Liberal hold		Swing	–0.1	

- Nairn's designation at the 1914 election was simply "Liberal", rather than "National Liberal".

1914 Western Australian state election: Swan
Party	Candidate	Votes	%	±%
Labor	Philip Turvey	1,186	44.3	−6.9
Liberal	William Nairn	1,100	41.1	−7.7
Independent	Thomas Ilbery	392	14.6	+14.6
Total formal votes		2,678	98.4	−1.2
Informal votes		44	1.6	+1.2
Turnout		2,722	67.5	−10.3
Two-party-preferred result
Liberal	William Nairn	1,433	53.5	+4.7
Labor	Philip Turvey	1,245	46.5	−4.7
Liberal gain from Labor		Swing	+4.7	

1911 Western Australian state election: Swan
Party	Candidate	Votes	%	±%
Labor	Philip Turvey	1,012	51.2	
Ministerialist	Mathieson Jacoby	963	48.8	
Total formal votes		1,975	99.6	
Informal votes		7	0.4	
Turnout		1,982	77.8	
Labor gain from Ministerialist		Swing		

=== Elections in the 1900s ===
1908 Western Australian state election: Swan
Party	Candidate	Votes	%	±%
Ministerialist	Mathieson Jacoby	677	40.0	−8.1
Ministerialist	Arthur Gull	391	23.1	−28.8
Ministerialist	Archibald Sanderson	328	19.4	+19.4
Labour	Hugh Linnanne	297	17.5	+17.5
Total formal votes		1,693	99.0	−0.8
Informal votes		17	1.0	+0.8
Turnout		1,710	53.2	+18.8
Two-candidate-preferred result
Ministerialist	Mathieson Jacoby	892	58.7	+10.6
Ministerialist	Arthur Gull	627	41.2	−10.6
Ministerialist hold		Swing	+10.6	

1905 Western Australian state election: Swan
Party	Candidate	Votes	%	±%
Ministerialist	Arthur Gull	469	51.9	+51.9
Ministerialist	Mathieson Jacoby	434	48.1	+48.1
Total formal votes		903	99.8	+0.8
Informal votes		2	0.2	–0.8
Turnout		906	34.4	–10.3
Ministerialist hold		Swing	N/A	

1904 Western Australian state election: Swan
Party	Candidate	Votes	%	±%
Independent	Mathieson Jacoby	712	58.6	+13.9
Independent	William Leslie	503	41.4	+41.4
Total formal votes		1,215	99.0	+1.6
Informal votes		12	1.0	–1.6
Turnout		1,227	44.7	–0.3
Independent hold		Swing	+13.9	

1901 Western Australian state election: Swan
Party	Candidate	Votes	%	±%
Opposition	Mathieson Jacoby	249	44.7	+44.7
Ministerialist	Robert Wolfe	128	23.0	+23.0
Labour	George Hogarth	115	20.6	+20.6
Independent	William Thomas	44	7.9	+7.9
Ministerialist	Hugh McKernan	21	3.8	+3.8
Total formal votes		557	97.4	±0.0
Informal votes		15	2.6	±0.0
Turnout		572	45.0	–6.5
Opposition gain from Independent		Swing	+44.7	

=== Elections in the 1890s ===
1897 Western Australian colonial election: Swan
Party	Candidate	Votes	%	±%
Independent	Norman Ewing	116	38.4	
Ministerialist	William Johnson	91	30.1	
Ministerialist	James Morrison	82	27.2	
Ministerialist	James Huelin	13	4.3	
Total formal votes		302	97.4	
Informal votes		8	2.6	
Turnout		310	51.5	
Independent hold		Swing		

1894 Western Australian colonial election: Swan
Party	Candidate	Votes	%	±%
None	William Loton	unopposed		

1890 Western Australian colonial election: Swan
Party	Candidate	Votes	%	±%
None	William Loton	83	55.3	n/a
None	Samuel Hamersley	67	44.7	n/a
