= Results of the 1904 Western Australian state election =

This is a list of the results of the 1904 state election in Western Australia, listed by electoral district.

== Results by electoral district ==
=== Albany ===
1904 Western Australian state election: Albany
Party	Candidate	Votes	%	±%
Labour	Charles Keyser	852	51.4	+51.4
Ministerialist	Albert Hassell	806	48.6	+48.6
Total formal votes		1,658	96.9	–2.4
Informal votes		53	3.1	+2.4
Turnout		1,711	43.1	–8.4
Labour gain from Opposition		Swing	+51.4	

=== Balcatta ===
1904 Western Australian state election: Balcatta
Party	Candidate	Votes	%	±%
Labour	Frederick Gill	938	56.5	+56.5
Independent	Thomas Molloy	448	27.0	+27.0
Ministerialist	Richard Taylor	273	16.5	+16.5
Total formal votes		1,659	98.5	n/a
Informal votes		25	1.5	n/a
Turnout		1,684	50.2	n/a
Labour win		(new seat)		

=== Beverley ===
1904 Western Australian state election: Beverley
Party	Candidate	Votes	%	±%
Independent	Charles Harper	376	53.4	+0.4
Ministerialist	Hugh Edmiston	328	46.6	–0.4
Total formal votes		704	99.4	+1.5
Informal votes		4	0.6	–1.5
Turnout		708	47.1	–10.5
Independent hold		Swing	–0.4	

=== Boulder ===
1904 Western Australian state election: Boulder
Party	Candidate	Votes	%	±%
Ministerialist	John Hopkins	1,327	61.5	+5.3
Labour	Michael McCarthy	830	38.5	+1.5
Total formal votes		2,157	99.7	+0.7
Informal votes		6	0.3	–0.7
Turnout		2,157	60.1	+4.2
Ministerialist hold		Swing	+5.3	

=== Brown Hill ===
1904 Western Australian state election: Brown Hill
Party	Candidate	Votes	%	±%
Labour	Thomas Bath	unopposed		
Labour win		(new seat)		

=== Bunbury ===
1904 Western Australian state election: Bunbury
Party	Candidate	Votes	%	±%
Ministerialist	Newton Moore	1,088	65.4	+20.1
Labour	Thomas Griffiths	576	34.6	+34.6
Total formal votes		1,664	99.3	+0.8
Informal votes		11	0.7	–0.8
Turnout		1,675	60.8	–2.7
Ministerialist hold		Swing	N/A	

=== Canning ===
1904 Western Australian state election: Canning
Party	Candidate	Votes	%	±%
Ministerialist	William Gordon	723	45.3	+45.3
Independent	James Milligan	392	24.6	+24.6
Independent	Norman Ewing	349	21.9	+21.9
Labour	James Healey	131	8.2	+8.2
Total formal votes		1,595	98.9	n/a
Informal votes		17	1.1	n/a
Turnout		1,612	54.0	n/a
Ministerialist win		(new seat)		

=== Claremont ===
1904 Western Australian state election: Claremont
Party	Candidate	Votes	%	±%
Ministerialist	John Foulkes	1,553	82.4	+41.0
Labour	Walter Abbott	331	17.6	+17.6
Total formal votes		1,884	97.3	–1.4
Informal votes		53	2.7	+1.4
Turnout		1,937	59.5	+8.7
Ministerialist hold		Swing	N/A	

=== Collie ===
1904 Western Australian state election: Collie
Party	Candidate	Votes	%	±%
Labour	Ernest Henshaw	859	59.5	+59.5
Ministerialist	John Ewing	584	40.5	+40.5
Total formal votes		1,443	98.6	n/a
Informal votes		21	1.4	n/a
Turnout		1,464	49.0	n/a
Labour win		(new seat)		

=== Coolgardie ===
1904 Western Australian state election: Coolgardie
Party	Candidate	Votes	%	±%
Labour	Henry Ellis	1,159	58.5	+58.5
Ministerialist	William Eddy	821	41.5	+41.5
Total formal votes		1,980	99.2	–0.7
Informal votes		15	0.8	+0.7
Turnout		1,995	59.7	+19.6
Labour gain from Ministerialist		Swing	+58.5	

=== Cue ===
1904 Western Australian state election: Cue
Party	Candidate	Votes	%	±%
Labour	Edward Heitmann	854	56.4	+56.4
Ministerialist	Frederick Illingworth	661	43.6	–12.7
Total formal votes		1,515	99.4	+0.2
Informal votes		9	0.6	–0.2
Turnout		1,524	58.5	+15.1
Labour gain from Ministerialist		Swing	+56.4	

=== Dundas ===
1904 Western Australian state election: Dundas
Party	Candidate	Votes	%	±%
Independent	Albert Thomas	695	54.0	+11.7
Labour	Robert Stewart	592	46.0	+20.6
Total formal votes		1,287	99.2	+3.4
Informal votes		10	0.8	–3.4
Turnout		1,297	64.8	+9.9
Independent hold		Swing	+11.7	

=== East Fremantle ===
1904 Western Australian state election: East Fremantle
Party	Candidate	Votes	%	±%
Labour	William Angwin	1,245	53.0	+26.0
Ministerialist	Joseph Holmes	1,104	47.0	–26.0
Total formal votes		2,349	99.6	+0.6
Informal votes		10	0.4	–0.6
Turnout		2,359	55.7	+7.4
Labour gain from Ministerialist		Swing	+26.0	

=== East Perth ===
1904 Western Australian state election: East Perth
Party	Candidate	Votes	%	±%
Ministerialist	Walter James	1,396	52.7	–10.0
Labour	Edward Casson	1,253	47.3	+47.3
Total formal votes		2,649	98.4	–0.7
Informal votes		42	1.6	+0.7
Turnout		2,695	38.7	–0.9
Ministerialist hold		Swing	–10.0	

=== Forrest ===
1904 Western Australian state election: Forrest
Party	Candidate	Votes	%	±%
Labour	Albert Wilson	751	77.5	+77.5
Independent	George Baxter	218	22.5	+22.5
Total formal votes		969	99.8	n/a
Informal votes		2	0.2	n/a
Turnout		971	40.0	n/a
Labour win		(new seat)		

=== Fremantle ===
1904 Western Australian state election: Fremantle
Party	Candidate	Votes	%	±%
Labour	Ted Needham	875	50.8	+50.8
Ministerialist	Frank Cadd	847	49.2	+49.2
Total formal votes		1,722	98.8	+0.5
Informal votes		21	1.2	–0.5
Turnout		1,743	33.2	+10.6
Labour gain from Ministerialist		Swing	+50.8	

=== Gascoyne ===
1904 Western Australian state election: Gascoyne
Party	Candidate	Votes	%	±%
Independent	William Butcher	unopposed		
Independent hold		Swing		

=== Geraldton ===
1904 Western Australian state election: Geraldton
Party	Candidate	Votes	%	±%
Ministerialist	Henry Carson	482	45.0	+45.0
Labour	Thomas Brown	461	43.0	+43.0
Ministerialist	Henry Spalding	129	12.0	+12.0
Total formal votes		1,072	98.7	n/a
Informal votes		14	1.3	n/a
Turnout		1,086	68.5	n/a
Ministerialist gain from Opposition		Swing	+45.0	

=== Greenough ===
1904 Western Australian state election: Greenough
Party	Candidate	Votes	%	±%
Ministerialist	John Nanson	289	35.0	+35.0
Independent	Patrick Stone	211	25.6	–9.9
Independent	Samuel Mitchell	181	21.9	+21.9
Independent	Richard Pennefather	144	17.5	+17.5
Total formal votes		825	98.2	+0.1
Informal votes		15	1.8	–0.1
Turnout		839	62.2	–5.0
Ministerialist hold		Swing	N/A	

=== Guildford ===
1904 Western Australian state election: Guildford
Party	Candidate	Votes	%	±%
Ministerialist	Hector Rason	1,343	69.0	+2.9
Labour	Samuel Jackson	604	31.0	+31.0
Total formal votes		1,947	99.2	+0.8
Informal votes		15	0.8	–0.8
Turnout		1,962	48.5	n/a
Ministerialist hold		Swing	+2.9	

=== Hannans ===
1904 Western Australian state election: Hannans
Party	Candidate	Votes	%	±%
Labour	Wallace Nelson	1,292	63.4	–36.6
Independent	John Marshall	746	36.6	+36.6
Total formal votes		2,038	99.8	n/a
Informal votes		5	0.2	n/a
Turnout		2,043	46.3	n/a
Labour hold		Swing	–36.6	

=== Irwin ===
1904 Western Australian state election: Irwin
Party	Candidate	Votes	%	±%
Ministerialist	Samuel Moore	454	65.0	+65.0
Independent	William Philbey	134	19.2	+19.2
Ministerialist	Charles Cheeseborough	110	15.8	+15.8
Total formal votes		698	98.9	n/a
Informal votes		8	1.1	n/a
Turnout		706	46.7	n/a
Ministerialist hold		Swing	N/A	

=== Ivanhoe ===
1904 Western Australian state election: Ivanhoe
Party	Candidate	Votes	%	±%
Labour	John Scaddan	1,335	60.0	+60.0
Independent Labour	James Cummins	888	40.0	+40.0
Total formal votes		2,223	99.7	n/a
Informal votes		7	0.3	n/a
Turnout		2,230	58.2	n/a
Labour win		(new seat)		

=== Kalgoorlie ===
1904 Western Australian state election: Kalgoorlie
Party	Candidate	Votes	%	±%
Labour	William Johnson	1,556	52.1	+14.4
Independent	Norbert Keenan	1,431	47.9	+47.9
Total formal votes		2,987	99.6	+7.1
Informal votes		12	0.4	–7.1
Turnout		3,004	58.9	+8.8
Labour hold		Swing	N/A	

=== Kanowna ===
1904 Western Australian state election: Kanowna
Party	Candidate	Votes	%	±%
Labour	Robert Hastie	unopposed		
Labour hold		Swing		

=== Katanning ===
1904 Western Australian state election: Katanning
Party	Candidate	Votes	%	±%
Independent	Frederick Henry Piesse	unopposed		
Independent win		(new seat)		

=== Kimberley ===
1904 Western Australian state election: Kimberley
Party	Candidate	Votes	%	±%
Independent	Francis Connor	288	51.1	+51.1
Independent	Sydney Pigott	276	48.9	+48.9
Total formal votes		564	99.5	n/a
Informal votes		3	0.5	n/a
Turnout		567	49.4	n/a
Independent win		(new seat)		

=== Menzies ===
1904 Western Australian state election: Menzies
Party	Candidate	Votes	%	±%
Ministerialist	Henry Gregory	1,087	53.0	–47.0
Labour	Richard Buzacott	966	47.0	+47.0
Total formal votes		2,053	99.5	n/a
Informal votes		10	0.5	n/a
Turnout		2,063	55.3	n/a
Ministerialist hold		Swing	–47.0	

=== Mount Leonora ===
1904 Western Australian state election: Mount Leonora
Party	Candidate	Votes	%	±%
Labour	Patrick Lynch	unopposed		
Labour win		(new seat)		

=== Mount Magnet ===
1904 Western Australian state election: Mount Magnet
Party	Candidate	Votes	%	±%
Labour	Frank Troy	721	61.3	+28.5
Ministerialist	Joseph Bryant	456	38.7	+38.7
Total formal votes		1,177	95.8	–3.9
Informal votes		52	4.2	+3.9
Turnout		1,227	48.6	+0.4
Labour gain from Opposition		Swing	+28.5	

=== Mount Margaret ===
1904 Western Australian state election: Mount Margaret
Party	Candidate	Votes	%	±%
Labour	George Taylor	unopposed		
Labour hold		Swing		

=== Murchison ===
1904 Western Australian state election: Murchison
Party	Candidate	Votes	%	±%
Labour	John Holman	unopposed		
Labour gain from Ministerialist		Swing	N/A	

=== Murray ===
1904 Western Australian state election: Murray
Party	Candidate	Votes	%	±%
Ministerialist	John McLarty	437	63.2	+63.2
Independent	William Atkins	254	36.8	–3.5
Total formal votes		691	98.3	–1.0
Informal votes		12	1.7	+1.0
Turnout		715	53.0	n/a
Ministerialist gain from Independent		Swing	+63.2	

=== Nelson ===
1904 Western Australian state election: Nelson
Party	Candidate	Votes	%	±%
Independent	Charles Layman	558	46.6	+46.6
Labour	Joseph Barraclough	320	26.7	+26.7
Ministerialist	John Clarke	320	26.7	+26.7
Total formal votes		1,198	99.1	n/a
Informal votes		11	0.9	n/a
Turnout		1,209	65.5	n/a
Independent gain from Ministerialist		Swing	+46.6	

=== Northam ===
1904 Western Australian state election: Northam
Party	Candidate	Votes	%	±%
Labour	Alfred Watts	1,033	56.7	+56.7
Ministerialist	Charles Knight	788	43.3	+43.3
Total formal votes		1,821	99.1	n/a
Informal votes		17	0.9	n/a
Turnout		1,847	46.8	n/a
Labour gain from Ministerialist		Swing	+56.7	

=== North Fremantle ===
1904 Western Australian state election: North Fremantle
Party	Candidate	Votes	%	±%
Labour	Harry Bolton	1,055	58.9	+18.1
Ministerialist	John Ferguson	735	41.0	–0.4
Total formal votes		1,790	99.2	+0.8
Informal votes		15	0.8	–0.8
Turnout		1,805	55.2	+1.6
Labour gain from Ministerialist		Swing	+18.1	

=== North Perth ===
1904 Western Australian state election: North Perth
Party	Candidate	Votes	%	±%
Labour	Francis Wilson	1,178	30.0	+15.8
Independent	Harry Stinton	932	23.7	+23.7
Ministerialist	James Brebber	838	21.3	+21.3
Independent	Richard Haynes	686	17.5	+17.5
Independent	Edward Edgcombe	296	7.5	+7.5
Total formal votes		3,930	99.2	n/a
Informal votes		31	0.8	n/a
Turnout		3,961	40.6	n/a
Labour gain from Opposition		Swing	+15.8	

=== Perth ===
1904 Western Australian state election: Perth
Party	Candidate	Votes	%	±%
Ministerialist	Harry Brown	990	63.0	+63.0
Labour	Frederick Gates	582	37.0	+37.0
Total formal votes		1,572	99.1	–0.3
Informal votes		14	0.9	+0.3
Turnout		1,586	28.0	–33.0
Ministerialist hold		Swing	N/A	

=== Pilbara ===
1904 Western Australian state election: Pilbara
Party	Candidate	Votes	%	±%
Ministerialist	James Isdell	428	64.7	+11.0
Labour	John Carey	234	35.3	+35.3
Total formal votes		662	99.7	+0.4
Informal votes		12	0.3	–0.4
Turnout		664	53.2	+12.9
Ministerialist hold		Swing	N/A	

=== Roebourne ===
1904 Western Australian state election: Roebourne
Party	Candidate	Votes	%	±%
Ministerialist	John Sydney Hicks	unopposed		
Ministerialist hold		Swing		

=== South Fremantle ===
1904 Western Australian state election: South Fremantle
Party	Candidate	Votes	%	±%
Ministerialist	Arthur Diamond	1,357	58.5	+21.6
Labour	Edward Gilleland	964	41.5	+11.8
Total formal votes		2,321	99.4	+0.7
Informal votes		15	0.6	–0.7
Turnout		2,336	39.2	–1.7
Ministerialist hold		Swing	+21.6	

=== Subiaco ===
1904 Western Australian state election: Subiaco
Party	Candidate	Votes	%	±%
Labour	Henry Daglish	1,890	80.0	+30.4
Independent	William Thomas	473	20.0	+20.0
Total formal votes		2,363	99.4	+2.0
Informal votes		14	0.6	–2.0
Turnout		2,377	71.9	+15.4
Labour hold		Swing	+30.4	

=== Sussex ===
1904 Western Australian state election: Sussex
Party	Candidate	Votes	%	±%
Independent	Frank Wilson	473	51.9	+51.9
Ministerialist	Ernest Locke	438	48.1	+13.1
Total formal votes		911	98.4	–1.1
Informal votes		15	1.6	+1.1
Turnout		926	83.7	+20.4
Independent gain from Ministerialist		Swing	+51.9	

=== Swan ===
1904 Western Australian state election: Swan
Party	Candidate	Votes	%	±%
Independent	Mathieson Jacoby	712	58.6	+13.9
Independent	William Leslie	503	41.4	+41.4
Total formal votes		1,215	99.0	+1.6
Informal votes		12	1.0	–1.6
Turnout		1,227	44.7	–0.3
Independent hold		Swing	+13.9	

=== Toodyay ===
1904 Western Australian state election: Toodyay
Party	Candidate	Votes	%	±%
Ministerialist	Timothy Quinlan	unopposed		
Ministerialist hold		Swing		

=== Wellington ===
1904 Western Australian state election: Wellington
Party	Candidate	Votes	%	±%
Ministerialist	Thomas Hayward	458	51.5	+51.5
Independent	Harry Venn	241	27.1	+27.1
Labour	Hugh McNeil	190	21.4	–2.8
Total formal votes		889	98.9	+1.6
Informal votes		10	1.1	–1.6
Turnout		899	48.5	–9.1
Ministerialist gain from Independent		Swing	+51.5	

=== West Perth ===
1904 Western Australian state election: West Perth
Party	Candidate	Votes	%	±%
Independent	Charles Moran	1,064	38.2	+6.4
Labour	Robert Norman	1,049	37.6	+11.7
Ministerialist	Walter Simpson	676	24.2	+24.2
Total formal votes		2,789	98.4	+1.5
Informal votes		44	1.6	–1.5
Turnout		2,833	39.5	n/a
Independent hold		Swing	+6.4	

=== Williams ===
1904 Western Australian state election: Williams
Party	Candidate	Votes	%	±%
Independent	Frank Cowcher	531	45.0	+45.0
Labour	Peter Wedd	274	23.2	+23.2
Independent	Richard Gell	198	16.8	+16.8
Ministerialist	Julius Nenke	176	14.9	+14.9
Total formal votes		1,179	98.5	n/a
Informal votes		18	1.5	n/a
Turnout		1,197	54.6	n/a
Independent gain from Ministerialist		Swing	+45.0	

=== Yilgarn ===
1904 Western Australian state election: Yilgarn
Party	Candidate	Votes	%	±%
Labour	Austin Horan	1,172	61.6	+30.2
Ministerialist	William Hedges	732	38.4	+38.4
Total formal votes		1,904	98.9	–0.5
Informal votes		21	1.1	+0.5
Turnout		1,925	30.0	–17.6
Labour gain from Opposition		Swing	+30.2	

=== York ===
1904 Western Australian state election: York
Party	Candidate	Votes	%	±%
Ministerialist	Richard Burges	unopposed		
Ministerialist hold		Swing		

== See also ==
- Members of the Western Australian Legislative Assembly, 1901–1904
- Members of the Western Australian Legislative Assembly, 1904–1905
