= Electoral results for the district of North Perth =

Results for North Perth, Western Australia

This is a list of electoral results for the Electoral district of North Perth in Western Australian state elections.

== Members for North Perth ==
Member	Party	Term
Charles Oldham	PLP (Labour)	1897–1900
Richard Speight	Independent	1901
George McWilliams	Oppositionist	1901–1904
Francis Ford Wilson	Labour	1904–1905
James Brebber	Ministerialist	1905–1908
Herbert Swan	Labour	1908–1914
James MacCallum Smith	Liberal	1914–1917
James MacCallum Smith	Nationalist	1917–1939
Arthur Abbott	Nationalist	1939–1945
Arthur Abbott	Liberal	1945–1949
Arthur Abbott	LCL	1949–1950
Ted Needham	Labor	1950–1953
Stan Lapham	Labor	1953–1959
Ray O'Connor	LCL	1959–1962

== Election results ==
=== Elections in the 1950s ===
1959 Western Australian state election: North Perth
Party	Candidate	Votes	%	±%
Liberal and Country	Ray O'Connor	3,490	46.3	+0.6
Labor	Stan Lapham	3,321	44.1	−10.2
Democratic Labor	William Sawyer	725	9.6	+9.6
Total formal votes		7,536	97.6	+0.2
Informal votes		188	2.4	−0.2
Turnout		7,724	91.9	−0.2
Two-party-preferred result
Liberal and Country	Ray O'Connor	4,060	53.9	+8.2
Labor	Stan Lapham	3,476	46.1	−8.2
Liberal and Country gain from Labor		Swing	+8.2	

1956 Western Australian state election: North Perth
Party	Candidate	Votes	%	±%
Labor	Stan Lapham	4,424	54.3	
Liberal and Country	Leslie Fawcett	3,720	45.7	
Total formal votes		8,144	97.4	
Informal votes		220	2.6	
Turnout		8,364	92.1	
Labor hold		Swing		

1953 Western Australian state election: North Perth
Party	Candidate	Votes	%	±%
Labor	Stan Lapham	3,825	55.5	−2.0
Liberal and Country	Florence Hummerston	3,069	44.5	+2.0
Total formal votes		6,894	98.2	+0.2
Informal votes		129	1.8	−0.2
Turnout		7,023	93.2	+2.8
Labor hold		Swing	−2.0	

1950 Western Australian state election: North Perth
Party	Candidate	Votes	%	±%
Labor	Ted Needham	4,486	57.5	
Liberal and Country	Alfred Spencer	3,321	42.5	
Total formal votes		7,807	97.9	
Informal votes		165	2.1	
Turnout		7,972	90.4	
Labor gain from Liberal and Country		Swing		

=== Elections in the 1940s ===
1947 Western Australian state election: North Perth
Party	Candidate	Votes	%	±%
Liberal	Arthur Abbott	3,308	60.0	+19.6
Labor	William Deal	2,203	40.0	−2.5
Total formal votes		5,511	97.7	+0.8
Informal votes		127	2.3	−0.8
Turnout		5,638	87.3	−7.9
Liberal hold		Swing	+6.1	

1943 Western Australian state election: North Perth
Party	Candidate	Votes	%	±%
Labor	Gavan McMullan	2,500	42.5	+9.8
Nationalist	Arthur Abbott	2,376	40.4	−3.0
Ind. Nationalist	Agnes Robertson	1,003	17.1	+17.1
Total formal votes		5,879	96.9	−1.7
Informal votes		187	3.1	+1.7
Turnout		6,066	95.2	+4.1
Two-party-preferred result
Nationalist	Arthur Abbott	3,171	53.9	−8.7
Labor	Gavan McMullan	2,708	46.1	+8.7
Nationalist hold		Swing	−8.7	

=== Elections in the 1930s ===
1939 Western Australian state election: North Perth
Party	Candidate	Votes	%	±%
Ind. Nationalist	Arthur Abbott	2,493	43.4	+43.4
Labor	Edward Holman	1,879	32.7	+2.0
Nationalist	James MacCallum Smith	1,368	23.8	−8.9
Total formal votes		5,740	98.6	−0.4
Informal votes		79	1.4	+0.4
Turnout		5,819	91.1	+15.3
Two-candidate-preferred result
Ind. Nationalist	Arthur Abbott	3,593	62.6	+62.6
Labor	Edward Holman	2,147	37.4	−4.2
Ind. Nationalist gain from Nationalist		Swing	N/A	

1936 Western Australian state election: North Perth
Party	Candidate	Votes	%	±%
Nationalist	James MacCallum Smith	1,559	32.7	−29.6
Labor	Edward Holman	1,462	30.7	+30.7
Nationalist	Reginald Miller	1,010	21.2	+21.2
Nationalist	Karl Drake-Brockman	730	15.3	+15.3
Total formal votes		4,761	99.0	+1.2
Informal votes		49	1.0	−1.2
Turnout		4,810	75.8	−16.4
Two-party-preferred result
Nationalist	James MacCallum Smith	2,779	58.4	−3.9
Labor	Edward Holman	1,982	41.6	+3.9
Nationalist hold		Swing	−3.9	

1933 Western Australian state election: North Perth
Party	Candidate	Votes	%	±%
Nationalist	James Smith	3,324	62.3	−0.7
Single Tax League	Edward White	2,007	37.7	+37.7
Total formal votes		5,331	97.8	−1.0
Informal votes		119	2.2	+1.0
Turnout		5,450	92.2	+23.8
Nationalist hold		Swing	N/A	

1930 Western Australian state election: North Perth
Party	Candidate	Votes	%	±%
Nationalist	James Smith	2,594	63.0	
Nationalist	Thomas Langley	1,521	37.0	
Total formal votes		4,115	98.8	
Informal votes		49	1.2	
Turnout		4,164	68.4	
Nationalist hold		Swing		

=== Elections in the 1920s ===
1927 Western Australian state election: North Perth
Party	Candidate	Votes	%	±%
Nationalist	James Smith	3,321	52.7	+5.7
Labor	Frank Darcey	2,985	47.3	+6.9
Total formal votes		6,306	98.9	+0.1
Informal votes		69	1.1	−0.1
Turnout		6,375	76.9	+20.4
Nationalist hold		Swing	−0.9	

1924 Western Australian state election: North Perth
Party	Candidate	Votes	%	±%
Nationalist	James Smith	1,986	47.0	−10.5
Labor	Frank Darcey	1,707	40.4	−2.1
Independent	Richard White	535	12.6	+12.6
Total formal votes		4,228	98.8	+0.2
Informal votes		53	1.2	−0.2
Turnout		4,281	56.5	−7.5
Two-party-preferred result
Nationalist	James Smith	2,265	53.6	−3.9
Labor	Frank Darcey	1,963	46.4	+3.9
Nationalist hold		Swing	−3.9	

1921 Western Australian state election: North Perth
Party	Candidate	Votes	%	±%
Nationalist	James Smith	2,349	57.5	−3.7
Labor	Ted Needham	1,734	42.5	+42.5
Total formal votes		4,083	98.6	+0.7
Informal votes		56	1.4	−0.7
Turnout		4,139	64.0	+15.5
Nationalist hold		Swing	N/A	

=== Elections in the 1910s ===
1917 Western Australian state election: North Perth
Party	Candidate	Votes	%	±%
National Liberal	James MacCallum Smith	1,690	61.3	+22.3
Independent	Richard White	1,069	38.7	+38.7
Total formal votes		2,759	97.9	+2.0
Informal votes		58	2.1	–2.0
Turnout		2,817	48.5	–8.6
National Liberal hold		Swing	N/A	

- Smith's designation at the 1914 election was simply "Liberal", rather than "National Liberal".

1914 Western Australian state election: North Perth
Party	Candidate	Votes	%	±%
Liberal	James Smith	1,835	38.9	+12.9
Labor	Herbert Swan	993	21.1	−35.3
Labor	Sidney Gibson	643	13.7	+13.7
Liberal	James George	456	9.7	+9.7
Labor	Peter Wedd	366	7.8	+7.8
Liberal	Arthur Wasley	242	5.1	+5.1
Liberal	Charles Galwey	176	3.7	+3.7
Total formal votes		4,711	95.9	−3.0
Informal votes		203	4.1	+3.0
Turnout		4,914	57.1	−26.3
After distribution of preferences
Liberal	James Smith	2,595	55.1	
Labor	Herbert Swan	1,202	25.5	
Labor	Sidney Gibson	914	19.4	
Liberal gain from Labor		Swing	N/A	

- Preferences were not distributed to completion.

1911 Western Australian state election: North Perth
Party	Candidate	Votes	%	±%
Labor	Herbert Swan	2,435	56.4	
Ministerialist	Walter Nairn	1,125	26.0	
Ministerialist	James Franklin	758	17.6	
Total formal votes		4,318	98.9	
Informal votes		49	1.1	
Turnout		4,367	83.4	
Labor hold		Swing		

- Preferences were not distributed.

=== Elections in the 1900s ===
1908 Western Australian state election: North Perth
Party	Candidate	Votes	%	±%
Labour	Herbert Swan	1,534	30.6	−7.5
Ministerialist	James Brebber	1,079	21.5	−40.4
Ministerialist	James Franklin	1,004	20.0	+20.0
Ministerialist	Edward Brady	586	11.7	+11.7
Independent Labour	Cecil Le Mesurier	435	8.7	+8.7
Ministerialist	Edward Hart	373	7.4	+7.4
Total formal votes		5,011	98.6	−0.4
Informal votes		73	1.4	+0.4
Turnout		5,084	65.8	+17.6
Two-party-preferred result
Labour	Herbert Swan	2,094	51.8	+13.7
Ministerialist	James Brebber	1,952	48.2	−13.7
Labour gain from Ministerialist		Swing	+13.7	

1905 Western Australian state election: North Perth
Party	Candidate	Votes	%	±%
Ministerialist	James Brebber	1,478	61.9	+40.6
Labour	Francis Wilson	911	38.1	–8.1
Total formal votes		2,389	99.0	–0.2
Informal votes		25	1.0	+0.2
Turnout		2,416	48.2	+7.6
Ministerialist gain from Labour		Swing	+40.6	

1904 Western Australian state election: North Perth
Party	Candidate	Votes	%	±%
Labour	Francis Wilson	1,178	30.0	+15.8
Independent	Harry Stinton	932	23.7	+23.7
Ministerialist	James Brebber	838	21.3	+21.3
Independent	Richard Haynes	686	17.5	+17.5
Independent	Edward Edgcombe	296	7.5	+7.5
Total formal votes		3,930	99.2	n/a
Informal votes		31	0.8	n/a
Turnout		3,961	40.6	n/a
Labour gain from Opposition		Swing	+15.8	

1901 North Perth state by-election
Party	Candidate	Votes	%	±%
Opposition	George McWilliams	882	48.9	+48.9
Opposition	Edgar Zollner	663	36.8	+16.7
Labour	John Jones	257	14.3	−2.7
Total formal votes		1,802	100	+0.6
Informal votes		0	0	−0.6
Turnout		1,802	N/A	N/A
Opposition gain from Independent		Swing	N/A	

1901 Western Australian state election: North Perth
Party	Candidate	Votes	%	±%
Independent	Richard Speight	1,125	62.9	+62.9
Opposition	Edgar Zollner	360	20.1	+20.1
Labour	Joseph Diver	303	16.9	+16.9
Total formal votes		1,788	99.4	+6.7
Informal votes		11	0.6	–6.7
Turnout		1,799	37.4	+24.6
Independent gain from Opposition		Swing	+62.9	

=== Elections in the 1890s ===
1897 Western Australian colonial election: North Perth
Party	Candidate	Votes	%	±%
Labour	Charles Oldham	73	30.2	
Ministerialist	James Bennett	69	28.5	
Ministerialist	Horace Stirling	47	19.4	
Independent	Michael Cavanagh	34	14.1	
Independent	John Phair	19	7.9	
Total formal votes		242	92.7	
Informal votes		19	7.3	
Turnout		261	62.0	
Labour gain from Ministerialist		Swing		
