= Electoral results for the district of Guildford =

Western Australian district election results

This is a list of electoral results for the Electoral district of Guildford in Western Australian state elections.

== Members for Guildford ==
Guildford (1901–1930)
Member	Party	Term
Hector Rason	Opposition	1901–1904
Hector Rason	Ministerial	1904–1906
William Johnson	Labor	1906–1917
Joseph Davies	National Labor	1917–1924
William Johnson	Labor	1924–1930
Guildford-Midland (1930–1962)
William Johnson	Labor	1930–1948
John Brady	Labor	1948–1962

== Election results ==
=== Elections in the 1950s ===
1959 Western Australian state election: Guildford-Midland
Party	Candidate	Votes	%	±%
Labor	John Brady	7,689	94.0	0.0
Communist	John Gandini	493	6.0	0.0
Total formal votes		8,182	90.8	−4.5
Informal votes		824	9.2	+4.5
Turnout		9,006	92.6	+0.5
Labor hold		Swing	0.0	

1956 Western Australian state election: Guildford-Midland
Party	Candidate	Votes	%	±%
Labor	John Brady	8,108	94.0	
Communist	Albert Marks	516	6.0	
Total formal votes		8,624	95.3	
Informal votes		429	4.7	
Turnout		9,053	92.1	
Labor hold		Swing		

1953 Western Australian state election: Guildford-Midland
Party	Candidate	Votes	%	±%
Labor	John Brady	7,910	92.8	+34.3
Communist	Albert Marks	614	7.2	−0.3
Total formal votes		8,524	93.8	−4.4
Informal votes		562	6.2	+4.4
Turnout		9,086	94.0	−1.1
Labor hold		Swing	N/A	

1950 Western Australian state election: Guildford-Midland
Party	Candidate	Votes	%	±%
Labor	John Brady	4,931	58.5	
Liberal and Country	Irene Seaton	2,869	34.0	
Communist	Alexander Jolly	633	7.5	
Total formal votes		8,433	98.2	
Informal votes		152	1.8	
Turnout		8,585	92.9	
Two-party-preferred result
Labor	John Brady		65.2	
Liberal and Country	Irene Seaton		34.8	
Labor hold		Swing		

- Two party preferred vote was estimated.

=== Elections in the 1940s ===
1948 Guildford-Midland state by-election
Party	Candidate	Votes	%	±%
Labor	John Brady	2,465	37.6	–9.8
Liberal	David Grayden	2,189	33.4	–1.2
Communist	Alexander Jolly	1,264	19.3	+0.4
Independent Liberal	Charles Plunkett	269	4.1	+4.1
Country	Walter Chamberlain	243	3.7	+3.7
Independent	Joseph Davies	60	0.9	+0.9
Independent Liberal	James Collins	60	0.9	+0.9
Total formal votes		6,550	96.5	–1.3
Informal votes		269	3.5	+1.3
Turnout		6,787	90.0	+3.2
Two-candidate-preferred result
Labor	John Brady	3,515	53.7	–4.5
Liberal	David Grayden	3,035	46.3	+4.5
Labor hold		Swing	–4.5	

- Collins and Davies recorded the same number of first-preference votes, but Collins' preferences were distributed first.

1947 Western Australian state election: Guildford-Midland
Party	Candidate	Votes	%	±%
Labor	William Johnson	3,058	46.5	−7.1
Liberal	Arthur Thompson	2,272	34.6	+34.6
Communist	Alexander Jolly	1,243	18.9	+18.9
Total formal votes		6,573	97.8	+0.1
Informal votes		150	2.2	−0.1
Turnout		6,723	86.8	−3.4
Two-party-preferred result
Labor	William Johnson	3,826	58.2	
Liberal	Arthur Thompson	2,747	41.8	
Labor hold		Swing	N/A	

1943 Western Australian state election: Guildford-Midland
Party	Candidate	Votes	%	±%
Labor	William Johnson	3,218	53.6	−11.3
Independent Labor	Francis Tuohy	1,834	30.5	+30.5
Ind. Nationalist	Leonard Seaton	955	13.9	+13.9
Total formal votes		6,007	97.7	−0.5
Informal votes		140	2.3	+0.5
Turnout		6,147	90.2	−3.3
Labor hold		Swing	N/A	

- Preferences were not distributed.

=== Elections in the 1930s ===
1939 Western Australian state election: Guildford-Midland
Party	Candidate	Votes	%	±%
Labor	William Johnson	3,797	64.9	−35.1
Independent	Joseph Batkin	2,054	35.1	+35.1
Total formal votes		5,851	98.2	
Informal votes		109	1.8	
Turnout		5,960	93.5	
Labor hold		Swing	N/A	

1936 Western Australian state election: Guildford-Midland
Party	Candidate	Votes	%	±%
Labor	William Johnson	unopposed		
Labor hold		Swing		

1933 Western Australian state election: Guildford-Midland
Party	Candidate	Votes	%	±%
Labor	William Johnson	3,930	70.8	−29.2
Nationalist	Robert Crowther	1,624	29.2	+29.2
Total formal votes		5,554	98.2	
Informal votes		100	1.8	
Turnout		5,654	93.1	
Labor hold		Swing	N/A	

1930 Western Australian state election: Guildford-Midland
Party	Candidate	Votes	%	±%
Labor	William Johnson	unopposed		
Labor hold		Swing		

=== Elections in the 1920s ===
1927 Western Australian state election: Guildford
Party	Candidate	Votes	%	±%
Labor	William Johnson	4,951	64.1	+8.3
Nationalist	Hubert Parker	2,768	35.9	−8.3
Total formal votes		7,719	99.3	−0.2
Informal votes		55	0.7	+0.2
Turnout		7,774	71.9	+0.7
Labor hold		Swing	+8.3	

1924 Western Australian state election: Guildford
Party	Candidate	Votes	%	±%
Labor	William Johnson	3,552	55.8	+9.8
National Labor	Joseph Davies	2,814	44.2	−5.0
Total formal votes		6,366	99.5	+1.3
Informal votes		32	0.5	−1.3
Turnout		6,398	71.2	+1.3
Labor gain from National Labor		Swing	+8.7	

1921 Western Australian state election: Guildford
Party	Candidate	Votes	%	±%
National Labor	Joseph Davies	2,621	49.2	+17.3
Labor	William Johnson	2,454	46.0	+2.9
National Labor	Henry Berry	256	4.8	+4.8
Total formal votes		5,331	98.2	+0.3
Informal votes		98	1.8	−0.3
Turnout		5,429	69.9	+4.1
Two-candidate-preferred result
National Labor	Joseph Davies	2,819	52.9	−2.5
Labor	William Johnson	2,512	47.1	+2.5
National Labor hold		Swing	−2.5	

=== Elections in the 1910s ===
1917 Western Australian state election: Guildford
Party	Candidate	Votes	%	±%
Labor	William Johnson	2,055	43.1	–26.4
National Labor	Joseph Davies	1,522	32.0	+32.0
Nationalist	George Hiscox	539	11.3	+11.3
Nationalist	William Crosbie	397	8.3	+8.3
Nationalist	Ernest Kerruish	251	5.3	+5.3
Total formal votes		4,764	97.9	–1.1
Informal votes		104	2.1	+1.1
Turnout		4,868	65.8	+11.0
Two-party-preferred result
National Labor	Joseph Davies	2,639	55.4	+55.4
Labor	William Johnson	2,125	44.6	–24.9
National Labor gain from Labor		Swing	+55.4	

1914 Western Australian state election: Guildford
Party	Candidate	Votes	%	±%
Labor	William Johnson	3,119	69.5	+2.8
Liberal	Harold Tuckfield	1,372	30.5	+13.8
Total formal votes		4,491	99.0	+0.3
Informal votes		46	1.0	−0.3
Turnout		4,537	54.8	−27.8
Labor hold		Swing	N/A	

1911 Western Australian state election: Guildford
Party	Candidate	Votes	%	±%
Labor	William Johnson	2,682	66.7	
Ministerialist	Frederick Percy	672	16.7	
Ministerialist	Percival Robinson	554	13.8	
Ministerialist	Peter Gugeri	114	2.8	
Total formal votes		4,022	98.7	
Informal votes		51	1.3	
Turnout		4,073	82.6	
Labor hold		Swing		

- Preferences were not distributed.

=== Elections in the 1900s ===
1908 Western Australian state election: Guildford
Party	Candidate	Votes	%	±%
Labour	William Johnson	1,980	69.6	+69.6
Ministerialist	Hubert Gull	534	18.8	−81.2
Ministerialist	George Lefroy	306	10.7	+10.7
Ministerialist	Edward Stevens	26	0.9	+0.9
Total formal votes		2,846	98.3	
Informal votes		49	1.7	
Turnout		2,895	79.7	
Labour gain from Ministerialist		Swing		

1906 Guildford state by-election
Party	Candidate	Votes	%	±%
Labor	William Johnson	1,747	68.3	+68.3
Ministerialist	Ferdinand Farrall	811	31.7	N/A
Total formal votes		2,558	99.6	
Informal votes		10	0.4	
Turnout		2,568	47.5	
Labor gain from Ministerialist		Swing	N/A	

1905 Western Australian state election: Guildford
Party	Candidate	Votes	%	±%
Ministerialist	Hector Rason	unopposed		
Ministerialist hold		Swing		

1904 Western Australian state election: Guildford
Party	Candidate	Votes	%	±%
Ministerialist	Hector Rason	1,343	69.0	+2.9
Labour	Samuel Jackson	604	31.0	+31.0
Total formal votes		1,947	99.2	+0.8
Informal votes		15	0.8	–0.8
Turnout		1,962	48.5	n/a
Ministerialist hold		Swing	+2.9	

1901 Western Australian state election: Guildford
Party	Candidate	Votes	%	±%
Ministerialist	Hector Rason	241	29.9	+29.9
Independent	Arthur Gull	339	28.4	+28.4
Opposition	Henry Downing	180	22.3	+22.3
Ministerialist	Alexander Watt	157	19.4	+19.4
Total formal votes		807	99.1	n/a
Informal votes		7	0.9	n/a
Turnout		814	57.6	n/a
Ministerialist win		(new seat)		
