= 1948 Guildford-Midland state by-election =

A by-election for the seat of Guildford-Midland in the Legislative Assembly of Western Australia was held on 13 March 1948. It was triggered by the death of the sitting member, William Johnson of the Labor Party, on 26 January 1948. The Labor Party retained the seat, with John Brady recording 53.7 percent of the two-party-preferred vote. The election was notable for the performance of the Communist Party candidate, Alexander Jolly, who polled 19.3 percent on first preferences (one of the party's highest totals in Western Australia).

== Background ==
William Johnson had held Guildford-Midland for the Labor Party since its creation at the 1930 state election. He had first been elected to parliament at the 1901 state election and served both as a government minister and Speaker of the Legislative Assembly at various points. Johnson died at St John of God Subiaco Hospital on 26 January 1948. After his death, the writ for the by-election was issued on 3 February, with the close of nominations on 17 February. Polling day was on 13 March, with the writ returned on 22 March.

== Results ==
Guildford-Midland state by-election, 1948
| Party | Candidate | Votes | % | ±% |
|---|---|---|---|---|
| Labor | John Brady | 2,465 | 37.6 | –9.8 |
| Liberal | David Grayden | 2,189 | 33.4 | –1.2 |
| Communist | Alexander Jolly | 1,264 | 19.3 | +0.4 |
| Independent Liberal | Charles Plunkett | 269 | 4.1 | +4.1 |
| Country | Walter Chamberlain | 243 | 3.7 | +3.7 |
| Independent | Joseph Davies | 60 | 0.9 | +0.9 |
| Independent Liberal | James Collins | 60 | 0.9 | +0.9 |
| Total formal votes | | 6,550 | 96.5 | –1.3 |
| Informal votes | | 269 | 3.5 | +1.3 |
| Turnout | | 6,787 | 90.0 | +3.2 |
Two-candidate-preferred result
| Labor | John Brady | 3,515 | 53.7 | –4.5 |
| Liberal | David Grayden | 3,035 | 46.3 | +4.5 |
| Labor hold | | Swing | –4.5 | |

- Collins and Davies recorded the same number of first-preference votes, but Collins' preferences were distributed first.

== Aftermath ==
Brady held Guildford-Midland until its abolition at the 1962 state election, and remained in parliament as the member for Swan until his retirement at the 1974 state election. He was a minister in the government of Albert Hawke between 1956 and 1959. Brady's chief opponent at the by-election, 23-year-old Liberal candidate David Grayden, was elected to parliament himself at the 1950 state election, but served only a single term before being defeated.

== See also ==
- List of Western Australian state by-elections
