= Electoral results for the district of South Murchison =

Western Australian district election results

This is a list of electoral results for the Electoral district of South Murchison in Western Australian state elections.

== Members for South Murchison ==
Member	Party	Term
Cornthwaite Rason	Ministerial	1897–1901

== Election results ==
=== Elections in the 1890s ===
1897 Western Australian colonial election: South Murchison
Party	Candidate	Votes	%	±%
Ministerialist	Cornthwaite Rason	87	40.8	
Ministerialist	Frederick Trude	80	37.6	
Independent	Malcolm Reid	39	18.3	
Opposition	John Perryman	7	3.3	
Total formal votes		213	98.6	
Informal votes		3	1.4	
Turnout		216	54.1	
Ministerialist hold		Swing		
