= 1944 Swan state by-election =

A by-election for the seat of Swan in the Legislative Assembly of Western Australia was held on 29 April 1944. It was triggered by the death of the sitting member, Richard Sampson of the Country Party, on 16 February 1944. The election was won by Ray Owen, who finished with 60.0 of the two-candidate-preferred vote standing as an "Independent Country" candidate. The runner-up was Howard Sampson, a brother of the deceased member.

== Background ==
A member of the Country Party, Richard Sampson had held Swan since the 1921 state election, and briefly served as a minister under James Mitchell. He died in office on 16 February 1944, aged 66. After his death, the writ for the by-election was issued on 21 March, with the close of nominations on 3 April. Polling day was on 29 April, with the writ returned on 18 May.

== Results ==
Swan state by-election, 1944
Party	Candidate	Votes	%	±%
Labor	Owen Hanlon	1,488	28.8	–8.5
Independent Country	Ray Owen	1,377	26.6	+26.6
Independent Country	Howard Sampson	988	19.1	+19.1
Country	Hurtle Prater	563	10.9	–51.8
Independent	John Thomas	465	9.0	+9.0
Nationalist	Herbert Yelland	288	5.6	+5.6
Total formal votes		5,169	96.9	+0.5
Informal votes		165	3.1	–0.5
Turnout		5,334	80.4	–12.6
Two-candidate-preferred result
Independent Country	Ray Owen	3,099	60.0	+60.0
Independent Country	Howard Sampson	2,070	40.0	+40.0
Independent Country gain from Country		Swing	n/a	

== Aftermath ==
Owen joined three other independents in parliament (Horace Berry, Lionel Kelly, and Harry Shearn), although Labor's comfortable majority meant they had little influence. At the 1947 state election, Owen was narrowly defeated by Gerald Wild of the Liberal Party. He joined the Country Party in 1949, and at the 1950 state election won the seat of Darling Range, which he would hold until 1962.

== See also ==
- List of Western Australian state by-elections
