= Richard Sampson (politician) =

Australian politician

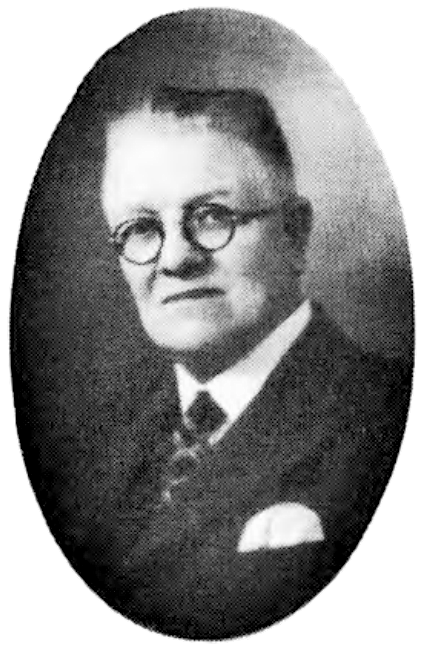

Member of the Legislative Assembly of Western Australia
- In office 12 March 1921 – 16 February 1944
- Preceded by: William Nairn
- Succeeded by: Ray Owen
- Constituency: Swan

Personal details
- Born: 16 November 1877 Hurtle Vale, South Australia, Australia
- Died: 16 February 1944 (aged 66) Perth, Western Australia, Australia
- Party: Country (to 1924); Nationalist (1924–1932); Country (after 1932)

Richard Stanley Sampson (16 November 1877 – 16 February 1944) was an Australian politician who was a member of the Legislative Assembly of Western Australia from 1921 until his death, representing the seat of Swan. He was a minister in the first government of Sir James Mitchell.

== Early life ==
Sampson was born in Hurtle Vale, South Australia, to Mary Ann (née Trengove) and Richard Sampson. Having been apprenticed to a printer in South Australia, he moved to Perth, Western Australia, in 1894, where he initially worked on The Inquirer & Commercial News. In 1896, Sampson founded his own printing company, which printed newspapers, magazines, and books (some of which Sampson wrote). He later also became the managing director of United Press Ltd (later Country Newspapers Pty Ltd), which owned various country newspapers. A prominent member of the community, Sampson served for periods on the Leederville and North Perth Municipal Councils, and was later elected to the Darling Range Road Board, serving as chairman from 1909 to 1928.

== Politics ==
At the 1921 state election, Sampson won election to the seat of Swan as the Country Party candidate, replacing William Nairn. In August 1922, he was elevated to the ministry in place of Frank Broun, becoming Colonial Secretary and Minister for Public Health. Sampson's promotion to the ministry caused the resignation of the Country Party leader, Tom Harrison, who believed he had not been duly consulted and that a more senior member of the party should have received the position.

The Country Party split into two rival factions in 1923, with Sampson joining the Ministerial (or Government) faction, which comprised supporters of the coalition with the Nationalist Party. After the 1924 election, which saw the defeat of the Mitchell government, he and several other Country MPs joined the Nationalist Party. He was re-elected as a Nationalist at the 1927 and 1930 elections, but rejoined the Country Party in August 1932, citing the interests of his constituents. Sampson remained in parliament until his death in Perth in February 1944. He had married Ethel Esther Woodcock in 1900, but they had no children.

== See also ==
- First Mitchell Ministry
- 1944 Swan state by-election

Parliament of Western Australia
| Preceded by William Nairn | Member for Swan; 1921–1944 | Succeeded by Ray Owen |
Political offices
| Preceded by Frank Broun | Colonial Secretary; 1922–1924 | Succeeded by John Drew |
| Preceded by Frank Broun | Minister for Public Health; 1922–1924 | Succeeded by John Drew |
