= Richard Septimus Haynes =

Australian lawyer and politician (1857–1922)

The Honourable Richard Haynes KC
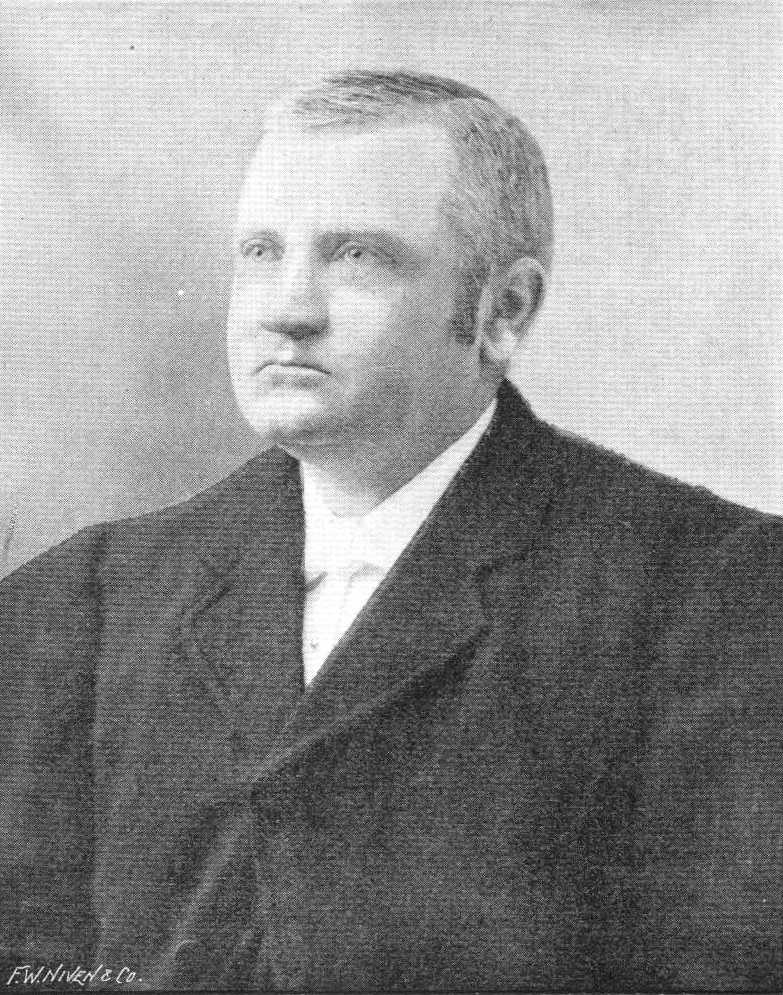

Member of the Legislative Council of Western Australia
- In office 27 July 1896 – 21 May 1902
- Preceded by: Hugh McKernan
- Succeeded by: Joseph Thomson
- Constituency: Central Province

Personal details
- Born: 14 August 1857 Picton, Colony of New South Wales
- Died: 20 February 1922 (aged 64) Mount Lawley, Western Australia, Australia

Richard Septimus Haynes KC (14 August 1857 – 20 February 1922) was an Australian barrister and politician who was a member of the Legislative Council of Western Australia from 1896 to 1902. A perennial candidate, he stood for parliament on six occasions (three times to the Legislative Council and three to the Legislative Assembly), but was elected only once.

== Early life ==
Haynes was born in Picton, Colony of New South Wales, to Margaret (née Daly) and John Joseph Haynes. After attending Sydney Grammar School, he trained as a lawyer, serving his articles of clerkship in Sydney and Armidale. He was called to the bar of New South Wales in 1880. Haynes moved to Perth in 1885, and the following year was elected to the Perth City Council. A political radical, he was a founder of the Eight Hours Association (advocating for the eight-hour workday), along with another future MP, John Horgan.

== Politics ==
At the 1890 general election (the first to be held for the Legislative Assembly), Haynes contested the seat of West Perth, but was defeated by Timothy Quinlan. He repeated his candidacy for West Perth at the 1894 election, but was again defeated, losing to Barrington Wood. In 1896, Haynes was elected to a six-year term in the Legislative Council, defeating a sitting member, Hugh McKernan, in Central Province. While in office, he was elected mayor of the Municipality of North Perth. At the 1902 Legislative Council elections, Haynes lost his seat to Joseph Thomson.

Haynes stood for parliament for a fifth time at the 1904 state election, but lost to a Labor candidate, Francis Wilson, in the seat of North Perth. He polled 17.5 percent of the vote, placing fourth out of five candidates. His sixth and final candidacy came at the 1908 Legislative Council elections, when he was defeated by Arthur Jenkins in Metropolitan Province. Haynes maintained his law firm on St Georges Terrace, Perth, until his death from diabetes in February 1922. He had married twice, to Marion Adelaide Goodwin in 1881 and to Anastasia D'Arcy in 1908, and had eleven children by his first wife.

== See also ==
- Members of the Western Australian Legislative Council
