= Hugh McKernan =

The Honourable Hugh McKernan
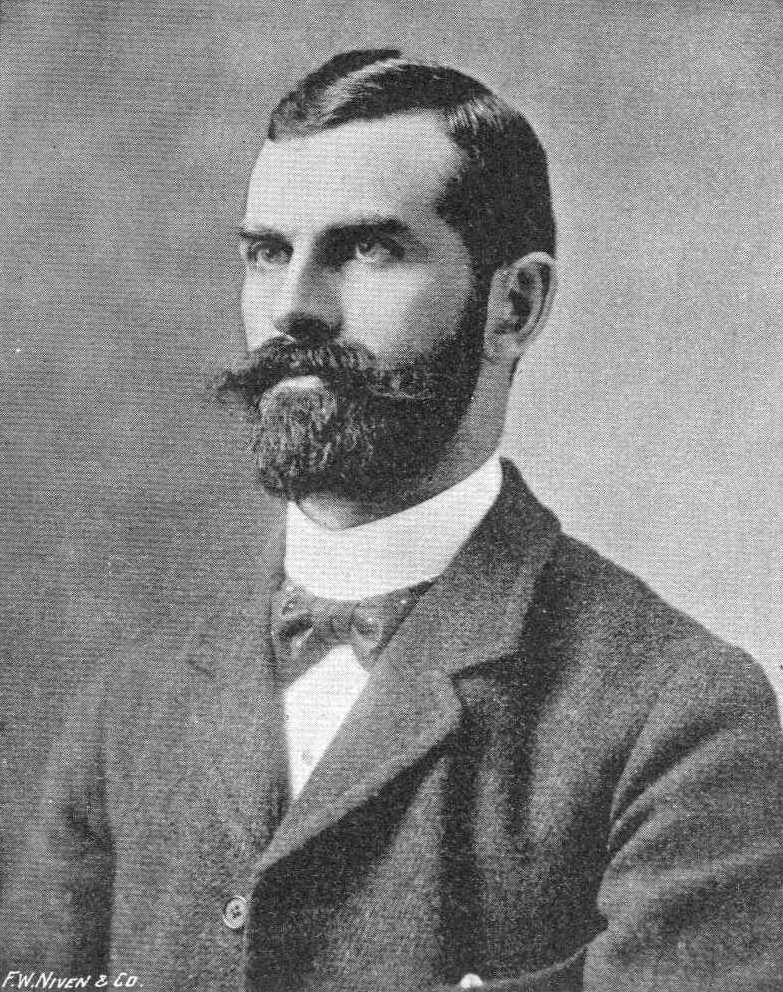

Member of the Legislative Council of Western Australia
- In office 16 July 1894 – 27 July 1896
- Preceded by: None (new creation)
- Succeeded by: Richard Haynes
- Constituency: Central Province

Personal details
- Born: c. 1858 Ireland
- Died: 13 March 1929 Subiaco, Western Australia, Australia

Hugh McKernan (c. 1858 – 13 March 1929) was an Australian businessman, newspaper proprietor, and politician who was a member of the Legislative Council of Western Australia from 1894 to 1896.

McKernan was born in Ireland, and at a young age became a member of the Royal Irish Constabulary. His job was to infiltrate nationalist gatherings and report on any speeches given. McKernan left Ireland for Australia in 1882, initially living in New South Wales. He came to Western Australia in 1889, attracted by the economic prospects of the Yilgarn gold rush, and set up in Perth as an auctioneer and agent for interstate and overseas companies. He eventually became the proprietor of the Geraldton Express, a newspaper in the Mid West. McKernan was elected to parliament at the 1894 Legislative Council elections, which were the first to be held after the advent of responsible government in 1890. He polled the third-highest number of votes in Central Province, and hence was only elected to a two-year term. In the same year, McKernan was also elected to the Perth City Council.

At the 1896 election, McKernan was defeated in Central Province by Richard Septimus Haynes. He recontested the seat at an 1898 by-election, caused by the resignation of Edward Wittenoom, but lost to William Loton. McKernan later stood for the Legislative Assembly at the 1901 state election, but lost to Mathieson Jacoby in the seat of Swan. In September 1907, he was arrested and charged with threatening to kill Richard Haynes (his opponent in the 1896 Central Province election), with whom he had a long-running feud. The charges were not proceeded with, on the grounds of temporary insanity. McKernan made one final run for parliament at the 1908 state election, losing to John Hardwick in the seat of East Perth. He died in Perth in 1929, having never married.
