= Philip Turvey =

Australian educator and politician

Member of the Legislative Assembly of Western Australia
- In office 3 October 1911 – 21 October 1914
- Preceded by: Mathieson Jacoby
- Succeeded by: William Nairn
- Constituency: Swan

Personal details
- Born: 28 June 1875 Glenorchy, Victoria, Australia
- Died: 27 October 1955 (aged 80) Subiaco, Western Australia, Australia
- Party: Labor

Philip Joseph Turvey (28 June 1875 – 27 October 1955) was an Australian educator and politician who was a Labor Party member of the Legislative Assembly of Western Australia from 1911 to 1914, representing the seat of Swan.

Turvey was born in Glenorchy, Victoria, to Bridget (née Roach) and John Turvey. He moved to Western Australia in 1898 and began working for the Education Department as a country schoolteacher, at various points teaching in Northam, Greenbushes, Narrogin, and Mundaring. Turvey served on the Northam Town Council in 1906, and was also a vice-president of the State School Teachers Union. He entered parliament at the 1911 state election, standing for the Labor Party in Swan and defeating Mathieson Jacoby (a former speaker). Turvey lost his seat to William Nairn of the Liberal Party at the 1914 election. He subsequently returned to teaching, working at Scotch College from 1915 to 1919. He later served as the commercial master at Perth Technical College from 1923 to 1940. Turvey died in Perth in October 1955, aged 80. He had married Annie Draffin in 1900, with whom he had three children.

Parliament of Western Australia
Preceded by Mathieson Jacoby	Member for Swan; 1911–1914	Succeeded by William Nairn
