= Stock Exchange of Perth =

Former Western Australian share market operator

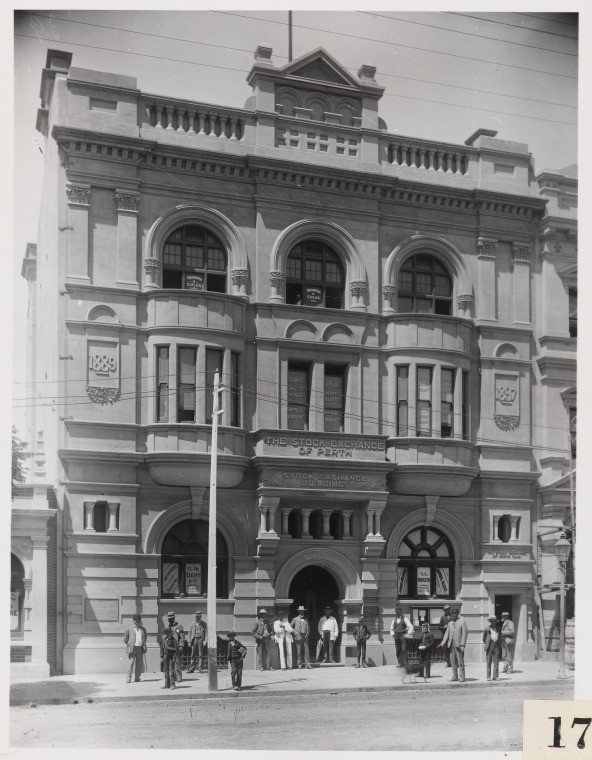
- Type: Stock exchange
- Location: Perth, Australia
- Coordinates: 31.955597°S 115.858762°E
- Founded: July 1889
- Closed: March 1987

The Stock Exchange of Perth or Perth Stock Exchange was a securities exchange in Perth, Western Australia, operating from its establishment in July 1889 until it merged with other five Australian securities exchanges into the Australian Securities Exchange on 1 April 1987.

An initial meeting of people interested in forming a stock exchange in Perth was held in August 1888, and the inaugural meeting of the Perth Stock Exchange was held on 1 October 1888, with Alexander Forrest as its president. High entrance fees were stated as the reason why a second stock exchange in Perth was formed the following year, in July 1889, the Stock Exchange of Perth, with Hector Rason as its president. At the exchange's first annual meeting, on 7 July 1890, Henry Saunders was elected as its president.

The Premier of Western Australia, John Forrest, laid the foundation stone for the new building for the Stock Exchange of Perth on 22 October 1896, located at 49 St Georges Terrace, Perth.

In 1937, the Australian Associated Stock Exchanges was established. It originally consisted of the stock exchanges in Adelaide, Brisbane, Hobart and Sydney, with the Melbourne and Perth ones joining later. In 1972, the Australian exchanges adopted a uniform listing standard.

In 1977, the Stock Exchange of Perth, in cooperation with the Education Department of Western Australia, introduced the share market game into schools, known as Capitaliser.

Official records of the Stock Exchange of Perth are held by the J S Battye Library in Perth and the Noel Butlin Archives Centre at the Australian National University in Canberra.
