= Arthur Gull =

Australian politician (1867–1951)

Member of the Legislative Assembly of Western Australia
- In office 27 October 1905 – 11 September 1908
- Preceded by: Mathieson Jacoby
- Succeeded by: Mathieson Jacoby
- Constituency: Swan

Personal details
- Born: 1 January 1867 Guildford, Western Australia
- Died: 30 March 1951 (aged 84) Subiaco, Western Australia

Arthur Courthope Gull (1 January 1867 – 30 March 1951) was an Australian politician who served as a member of the Legislative Assembly of Western Australia from 1905 to 1908, representing the seat of Swan. He ran for parliament on five occasions, but was only elected once.

Gull was born in Guildford, Western Australia, to Annie (née Dempster) and Thomas Courthope Gull. His father, a prominent merchant and briefly a member of parliament, died when he was ten years old, while two uncles, Andrew and Charles Edward Dempster, were also MPs. Gull initially attended the High School in Perth, but was later sent to Melbourne to board at Hawthorn Grammar School (run by Martin Howy Irving). On his return to Western Australia, he went to the North-West, spending two years as a jackaroo. Gull later lived for periods in Perth (working as a bank clerk) and on the Eastern Goldfields, eventually settling on a property in Bellevue (near Guildford).

At the 1901 state election, Gull stood as an independent for the seat of Guildford, but lost to Hector Rason (a future premier). He also stood against Rason at the 1902 Guildford by-election (a ministerial by-election), but was again defeated. At the 1905 state election, Gull won the seat of Swan, defeating the sitting Speaker of the Legislative Assembly, Mathieson Jacoby. His time in parliament was short-lived, however, as Jacoby won Swan back at the 1908 election. In 1909, Gull moved to a property in Serpentine. He contested the seat of Canning at the 1914 election, but was defeated by Robert Robinson. Gull eventually retired to Perth, dying there in March 1951 (aged 84).
