= Herbert Swan (Australian politician) =

Australian politician

Member of the Legislative Assembly of Western Australia
- In office 11 September 1908 – 21 October 1914
- Preceded by: James Brebber
- Succeeded by: James MacCallum Smith
- Constituency: North Perth

Personal details
- Born: 23 August 1869 Dapto, New South Wales, Australia
- Died: 14 June 1949 (aged 79) Nedlands, Western Australia, Australia
- Party: Labor

Herbert Graham Swan (23 August 1869 – 14 June 1949) was an Australian trade unionist and politician who was a Labor Party member of the Legislative Assembly of Western Australia from 1908 to 1914, representing the seat of North Perth.

Swan was born in Dapto, New South Wales (near Wollongong), to Elizabeth (née Graham) and William Henry Swan. He came to Western Australia in 1896 and found work as an engineer for Western Australian Government Railways, having previously worked in a similar position in New South Wales. He was a founder of a local railway trade union, the Amalgamated Railway Employees' Association, and served as its president from 1905 to 1908. Swan entered parliament at the 1908 state election, defeating James Brebber. He was re-elected at the 1911 election, but at the 1914 election was defeated by James MacCallum Smith, the Liberal Party's candidate (and a well-known newspaper proprietor). Swan attempted to reclaim his seat from Smith at the 1921 election, but was unsuccessful. He died in Perth in June 1949, aged 79. He had married twice, to Mary Ann Cowless in 1897. He was married for a second time to Minnie Waugh in 1913 in Narrogin WA. Minnie and Herbert had three children, Jessie Eleanor, Sheila Bernadette, Raymond Herbert Graham Swan. Minnie died in Narrogin in 1919 from pneumonic influenza.

Parliament of Western Australia
| Preceded by Edward Heitmann | Member for Cue; 1913–1930 | Abolished |
