= Charles Oldham (politician) =

Australian politician

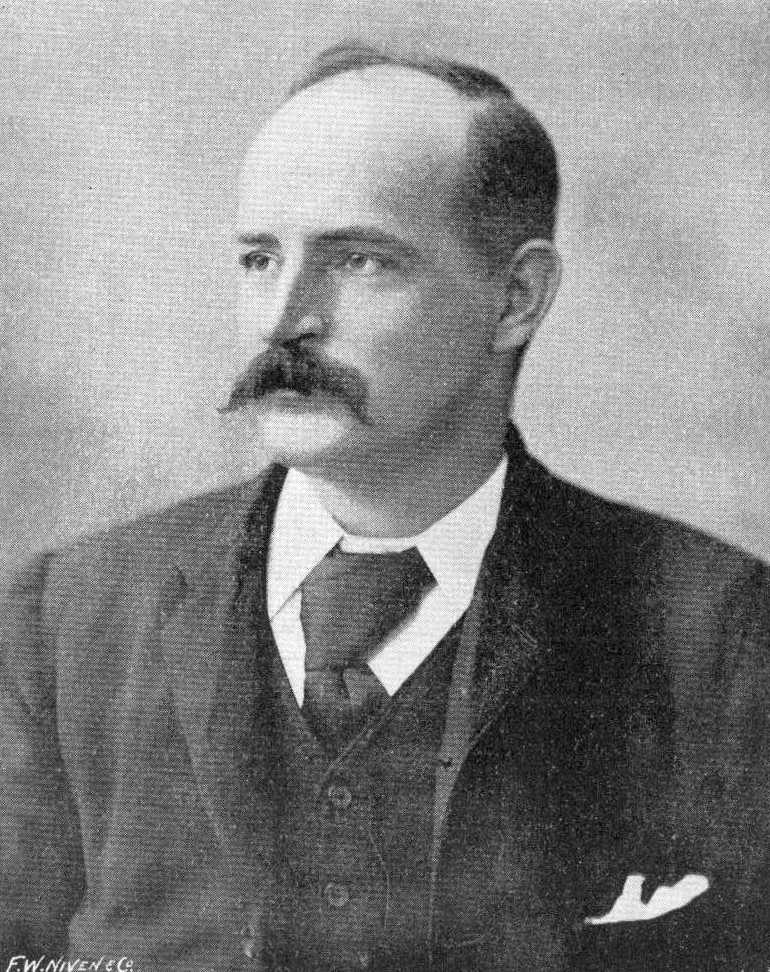

Member of the Legislative Assembly of Western Australia
- In office 5 May 1897 – 16 October 1900
- Preceded by: None (new creation)
- Succeeded by: Richard Speight
- Constituency: North Perth

Personal details
- Born: 20 November 1863 Barrow-in-Furness, Lancashire, England
- Died: 1935 (aged 71–72) Cheetham Hill, Manchester
- Spouse: Ann Helena Cottam
- Children: 4

Charles Henry Oldham (20 November 1863 – 1935) was a member of the Legislative Assembly of Western Australia from 1897 to 1900, representing the seat of North Perth.

Oldham was born in Barrow-in-Furness, Lancashire, England, and began working in a coal mine at the age of eleven. He later trained as a carpenter, and after finishing his apprenticeship worked as a journeyman. Oldham emigrated to Australia in 1889, living in Victoria for a period before going to Western Australia in 1892. Oldham worked as a carpenter, and in 1893 served as president of the Perth Trades and Labour Council. He founded his own building contracting business in 1894, and in 1896 was elected to the Perth City Council.

At the 1897 general election, Oldham won the newly created seat of North Perth. He stood as an opponent of the government of John Forrest and a supporter of the labour movement, and is regarded as the first Labor Party member of parliament in Western Australia. However, in October 1900, Oldham's seat was declared vacant by the Speaker of the Legislative Assembly, as he had not attended a sitting of the house for two months. He left Western Australia the following year, but his further whereabouts are unknown. A 1907 article in the Truth, a Perth-based newspaper, suggested that Oldham had left "many liabilities behind him", and might have gone to Argentina.

Burial records indicate that Charles Oldham died in December 1935 at The Jewish Hospital, Cheetham Hill, Manchester. His wife Ann Helena pre-deceased him in 1924 in Walmersley, Bury, Lancashire.

Parliament of Western Australia
New creation	Member for North Perth; 1897–1900	Succeeded by Richard Speight
