= Joseph Davies (Australian politician) =

Australian politician

Member of the Legislative Assembly of Western Australia
- In office 29 September 1917 – 22 March 1924
- Preceded by: William Johnson
- Succeeded by: William Johnson
- Constituency: Guildford

Personal details
- Born: 29 May 1880 Pontypridd, Glamorgan, Wales
- Died: 16 July 1954 (aged 74) Claremont, Western Australia, Australia
- Party: Labor (to 1917); National Labor (1917–1924); Nationalist (1924–?)
- Other political affiliations: Independent (1948)

Joseph Thomas Davies (29 May 1880 – 16 July 1954) was an Australian trade unionist and politician who was a member of the Legislative Assembly of Western Australia from 1917 to 1924, representing the seat of Guildford.

== Early life ==
Davies was born in Pontypridd, Wales, to Elizabeth Olivia (née Morgan) and Joseph Edward Davies. He began working in the coal mines of South Wales as a boy, and then in 1899 emigrated to Australia. Davies settled in Perth, where he worked as a labourer (and later boilermaker) at the Midland Railway Workshops. He was involved in various railway trade unions, and in 1911 began working full-time as a union official. Davies also served on the West Guildford Road Board from 1907.

== Politics ==
Davies left the Labor Party in the aftermath of the 1916 split on conscription, joining the newly formed National Labor Party. He entered parliament at the 1917 state election, defeating William Johnson (the sitting Labor member and a former party leader) in the seat of Guildford. Davies was re-elected at the 1921 election, albeit with a reduced majority. However, in 1924 William Johnson reclaimed the seat for the Labor Party. Davies attempted to re-enter parliament at the 1924 and 1926 Legislative Council elections, standing as a Nationalist in Metropolitan-Suburban Province, but was defeated on both occasions. He made one final run for parliament at the 1948 Guildford-Midland by-election, standing as an independent, but polled just 0.9 percent of the vote. Davies died in Perth in 1954, aged 74. He had married Mary Theresa Brown in 1903, with whom he had ten children.

== See also ==
- Members of the Western Australian Legislative Assembly

Parliament of Western Australia
| Preceded by William Johnson | Member for Guildford; 1917–1924 | Succeeded by William Johnson |
