= Mathieson Jacoby =

Australian politician and winemaker

The Honourable Mathieson Jacoby
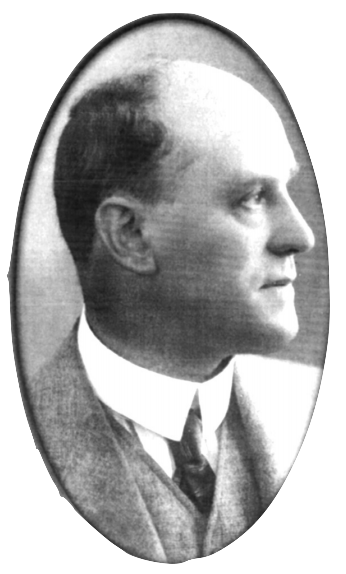

3rd Speaker of the Legislative Assembly of Western Australia
- In office 28 July 1904 – 27 October 1905
- Preceded by: Charles Harper
- Succeeded by: Timothy Quinlan

Member of the Legislative Assembly of Western Australia
- In office 24 April 1901 – 27 October 1905
- Preceded by: Norman Ewing
- Succeeded by: Arthur Gull
- Constituency: Swan
- In office 11 September 1908 – 3 October 1911
- Preceded by: Arthur Gull
- Succeeded by: Philip Turvey
- Constituency: Swan

Personal details
- Born: Manuel Harry Jacoby (Note: His name at birth, per his birth certificate, was "Manuel Harry Jacoby".); 1 July 1869 Adelaide, South Australia, Australia
- Died: 3 April 1915 (aged 45) North Perth, Western Australia, Australia

Mathieson Harry Jacoby (1 July 1869 – 3 April 1915) was an Australian politician who twice represented the seat of Swan in the Legislative Assembly of Western Australia, from 1901 to 1905 and then again from 1908 to 1911. He was Speaker of the Legislative Assembly from 1904 to 1905. Outside politics Jacoby was a noted viticulturist, one of the pioneers of the West Australian wine industry.

== Early life and business career ==
Jacoby was born in Adelaide to Hannah (née Mathieson) and Daniel Jacoby. The Jacoby family moved from to Western Australia in 1891, and Mathieson Jacoby (who had worked for the Telegraph Department in South Australia) initially gained work in Perth as an agent for Adelaide firms. In 1893, assisted by their father, he and his two brothers (Frederick and Ted) bought a vineyard in the Perth Hills, abutting the Smiths Mill line of the Eastern Railway. After talking with the Aboriginal inhabitants of the area, Jacoby decided to adopt "Mundaring", an approximation of their name for the area, as the name of the property, which was subsequently extended to the nearby railway siding and eventually to the surrounding locality. In December 1897, the vineyard was incorporated as a limited liability company – the Mundaring Vineyard Company. Jacoby was made managing director, despite having lost his left eye in a blasting accident earlier in the year. He already had poor sight in his other eye, which had been struck by a stockwhip when he was thirteen. One of the nurses at the hospital where Jacoby recovered after his accident was Mary Cresswell. The two married in January 1899, and had three sons and a daughter together.

== Parliamentary service ==
=== First term and controversy ===
Jacoby entered politics at the 1901 state election, winning the seat of Swan against former MLC Hugh McKernan. He had first become involved in public life shortly after arriving in Western Australia, when he and George McWilliams established the first branch of the St John Ambulance in the colony. Jacoby's candidacy was endorsed by The Sunday Times, who regarded him as "a clean citizen and a trustworthy politician with a democratic programme", and also noted that he had "won the confidence of the Labor Party". In the election, he stood in opposition to the government of George Throssell, with the four other nominees for the seat comprising two pro-Throssell candidates, one Labor candidate, and one independent candidate. Jacoby was elected with 44.7 percent of the vote, under the first-past-the-post system in place at the time, and consequently replaced Norman Ewing, who had resigned just before the election to enter federal politics.

When parliament resumed, Jacoby aligned himself with the faction opposing the new premier, George Leake, which was led by Frederick Piesse. He was appointed one of two whips for the grouping, alongside Alexander Forrest. In early 1902, Jacoby was successfully sued by the proprietor of the Mundaring Hotel, a case that received widespread coverage. Prior to his election the previous year, he had authorised one of his supporters to ply potential voters with liquor; the supporter was unable to pay, and directed the proprietor to Jacoby, who refused to pay. The sum in question was A£6 7s. 6d. (or around $1,250, as of 2015). The Sunday Times, which had earlier praised Jacoby, accused him of "buying votes with beer", and expressed that he had "unquestionably disgraced the Parliament" and proved his "unfitness for membership". Despite this incident, Jacoby was comfortably re-elected at the 1904 election, gaining 58.60% of the vote. He faced only a single opponent, who (like Jacoby) ran as an independent.

=== Speakership ===
When parliament sat for the first time following the 1904 election, in late July, Charles Moran, an independent, unexpectedly nominated Jacoby to serve as speaker. Jacoby, supported by Labor, was elected "by a large margin" over John Foulkes, who was the candidate of the government of Walter James (recently reduced to a minority in the assembly). The election of Jacoby, who became the first speaker to preside over the new Parliament House, was said to have marked "the beginning of the end" for the James government, which fell less than a month later and was replaced by one led by Henry Daglish (Western Australia's first Labor government). Jacoby's election was regarded with bemusement, although not unfavourably received, by The West Australian, but was condemned completely by The Sunday Times, which wrote that he was "of all men the least fitted by nature, ability and training for the responsible post into which accident has exalted him". Jacoby served as speaker until he lost his seat at the early 1905 election, which had been pre-empted by the defeat of Daglish's government.

=== Final term and later years ===
Defeated by Arthur Gull in 1905, despite both he and his opponent supporting the new government of Cornthwaite Rason, Jacoby won his seat back at the 1908 election, defeating Gull. In what was to be his final term in parliament, he concerned himself mainly with the interests of growers and producers, and notably advocated for Southern Europeans to be allowed into the country as labourers. Jacoby, who had aligned himself with the governments of Newton Moore and Frank Wilson, was defeated by a Labor candidate, Philip Turvey, at the 1911 election. His retirement was short-lived, as he died in North Perth in April 1915, of heart disease. Aged only 45, Jacoby left large debts behind him, and his wife was forced to sell the Mundaring property. One of the couple's sons, Ian Mathieson Jacoby, who was 14 at the time of his father's death, was later prominent in Australian financial circles.
