= George McWilliams =

Australian politician

Lieutenant-Colonel Dr George McWilliams
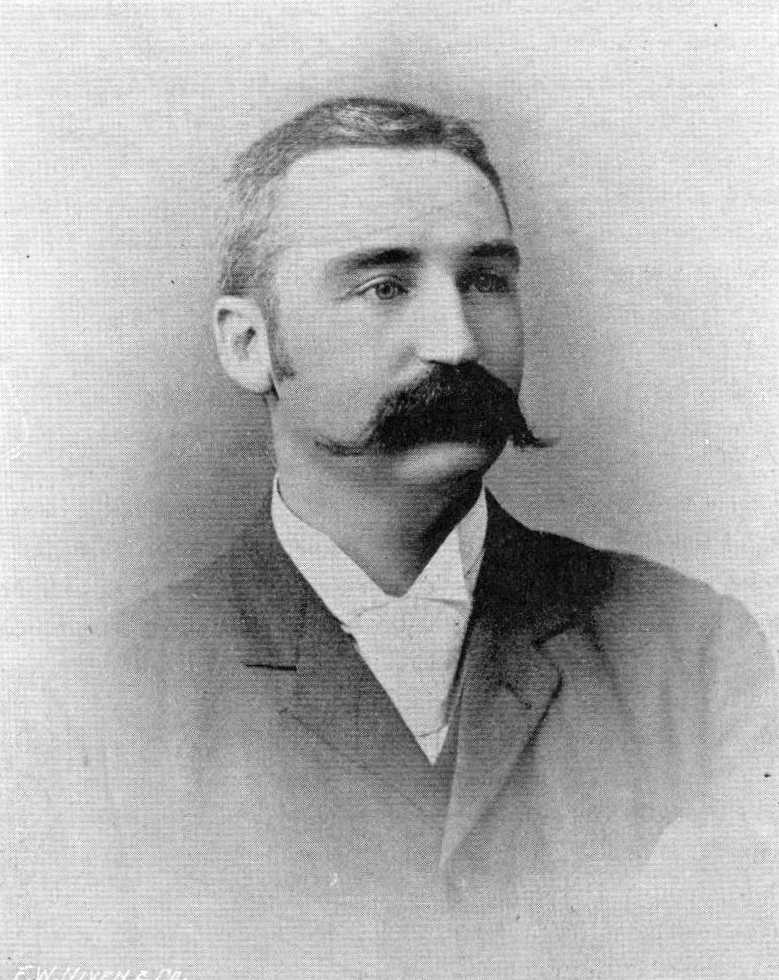

Member of the Legislative Assembly of Western Australia
- In office 5 October 1901 – 24 June 1904
- Preceded by: Richard Speight
- Succeeded by: Francis Wilson
- Constituency: North Perth

Personal details
- Born: 10 November 1865 near Geelong, Victoria, Australia
- Died: 12 February 1907 (aged 41) Perth, Western Australia
- Education: University of Melbourne

George Frederick McWilliams (10 November 1865 – 12 February 1907) was an Australian medical doctor, military surgeon, and politician. He served as a member of the Legislative Assembly of Western Australia from 1901 to 1904, representing the seat of North Perth.

== Early life ==
McWilliams was born near Geelong, Victoria, to Anne (née Toohey) and Wilson McWilliams. He was sent to school in England, but returned to Australia to study at the University of Melbourne, graduating with a medical degree (M.B.) in 1888. McWilliams left for Western Australia later that year, initially practising medicine in York. He later spent time in the North-West, working for periods as a pearler and a stockman, before moving to Perth to establish his own practice. With Mathieson Jacoby, McWilliams helped to found the state branch of the St John Ambulance, and served as the inaugural president.

== Military and political service ==
During the Second Boer War, McWilliams volunteered with the West Australian Mounted Infantry, serving as the contingent's chief medical officer. He began the war with the rank of captain, and was subsequently promoted major and then lieutenant-colonel, returning to Australia in late 1900. McWilliams entered parliament at the 1901 North Perth by-election, which had been caused by the death of Richard Speight after only a few months in office. In April 1902, McWilliams was selected to represent Australia at the coronation of Edward VII in London, as the leader of the contingent from Western Australia. He returned to Australia in October 1902, but did not recontest his seat at the 1904 state election.

== Later life ==
After leaving parliament, McWilliams was appointed to the board of the Perth Hospital. Unmarried, he died in Perth in February 1907, aged 41, from complications of gastroenteritis. He was buried at Karrakatta Cemetery with full military honours, with the service conducted by the Bishop of Perth, Charles Riley.

Parliament of Western Australia
| Preceded by Richard Speight | Member for North Perth; 1904–1905 | Succeeded by Francis Wilson |
