= Jack Skidmore =

Australian trade unionist and politician

Member of the Legislative Assembly of Western Australia
- In office 30 March 1974 – 31 January 1982
- Preceded by: John Brady
- Succeeded by: Gordon Hill
- Constituency: Swan

Personal details
- Born: 18 November 1919 Kellerberrin, Western Australia, Australia
- Died: 31 December 1999 (aged 80) Bassendean, Western Australia, Australia
- Party: Labor (to 1981)
- Other political affiliations: Independent (from 1981)

John Edward Skidmore (18 November 1919 – 31 December 1999) was an Australian trade unionist and politician who was a member of the Legislative Assembly of Western Australia from 1974 to 1982, representing the seat of Swan. He represented the Labor Party until 1981, when he resigned to sit as an independent.

== Early life ==
Skidmore was born in Kellerberrin, Western Australia, to Kate (née Clark) and George Bagnall Skidmore. He trained as an electrician, and during World War II served with an electrical engineering unit in the Australian Army. After the war, Skidmore again worked as an electrician, living for periods in Perth, Wagin, and Albany. He served on the Wagin Municipal Council from 1949 to 1951 and the Albany Road Board from 1952 to 1953. From 1960, Skidmore worked as a union official, initially with the Electrical Trades Union and then with others.

== Politics ==
A long-time member of the Labor Party, Skidmore was elected to parliament at the 1974 state election, replacing the retiring John Brady. Having been re-elected at the 1977 election, Skidmore was included in the new shadow ministry formed by Ron Davies in March 1978, who had replaced Colin Jamieson as party leader. Davies was replaced as leader by Brian Burke in a leadership spill in September 1981, and Skidmore resigned from the party in protest the following month, choosing to sit as an independent. In an explanation made to parliament, he said the actions of Burke and Mal Bryce, his new deputy, "reek[ed] of insincerity and disloyalty", and that he had "no time for such people who use … despicable tactics for the furtherance of their own selfish interests". Skidmore resigned from parliament altogether in January 1982, and his seat was won by Labor's Gordon Hill at the resulting by-election.

== Later life ==
Skidmore eventually reconciled with the Labor Party, and was made a life member in 1999. In retirement, he lived in Bassendean, where he died in December 1999 (aged 80). He had married Vera Haustead in 1945, with whom he had five children.
