= Richard Speight =

Australian politician

Member of the Western Australian Parliament for North Perth
- In office 24 April 1901 – 19 September 1901
- Preceded by: Charles Oldham
- Succeeded by: George McWilliams

Personal details
- Born: 2 December 1838 Selby, Yorkshire, England
- Died: 19 September 1901 (aged 62) Perth, Western Australia, Australia
- Resting place: Karrakatta cemetery
- Party: Independent
- Profession: Railway commissioner, public servant and politician
- Known for: Inaugural railway commissioner of Railways Commission of Victoria

Richard Speight (2 December 1838 – 19 September 1901) was an English-born commissioner of railways in the Colony of Victoria, serving between 1883 and 1892. In his latter years, Speight was briefly a Member of the Western Australian Legislative Assembly.

== Biography ==
Speight was born in Selby, Yorkshire, England. He was brought up from boyhood in the service of the Midland Railway Company until he attained a responsible position on the management. Speight accepted the new post of railway commissioner of the Railways Department of Victoria, in 1883. Most notably, he, along with fellow commissioners Alfred John Agg and R. Ford, was tasked with implementing the Railway Construction Act 1884, dubbed the "Octopus Act", which authorised the construction of fifty-nine new lines, as well as other additional works.

Conservative by nature, Speight preferred to invest in quality infrastructure in order to reduce operational and maintenance costs. However, that policy was in opposition the expansionist push by Victorian political leaders including Thomas Bent and John Woods, and it was alleged that Speight had over–extended the State.

Amidst claims of corruption and mismanagement, and the onset of a severe economic depression, Speight and the other commissioners resigned in 1892, following the passing of the Railways Act 1892 that relieved them of the responsibility for railway construction and reduced much of their power. Almost immediately, Speight sued David Syme, the editor of The Age, for £25,000, alleging libel. Speight lost on nine of the ten counts, and was awarded one farthing in damages for the count he won. In 1895, he was refused a new trial.

In 1898, he relocated to Western Australia, where he became managing director of Jarrahdale Jarrah Forests and Railways Company. At the 1901 state election, Speight won the seat of North Perth as an independent candidate, but died five months later, on 19 September 1901, survived by eight children.
