= Electoral district of South Murchison =

Former electoral district in Western Australia

South Murchison Western Australia—Legislative Assembly
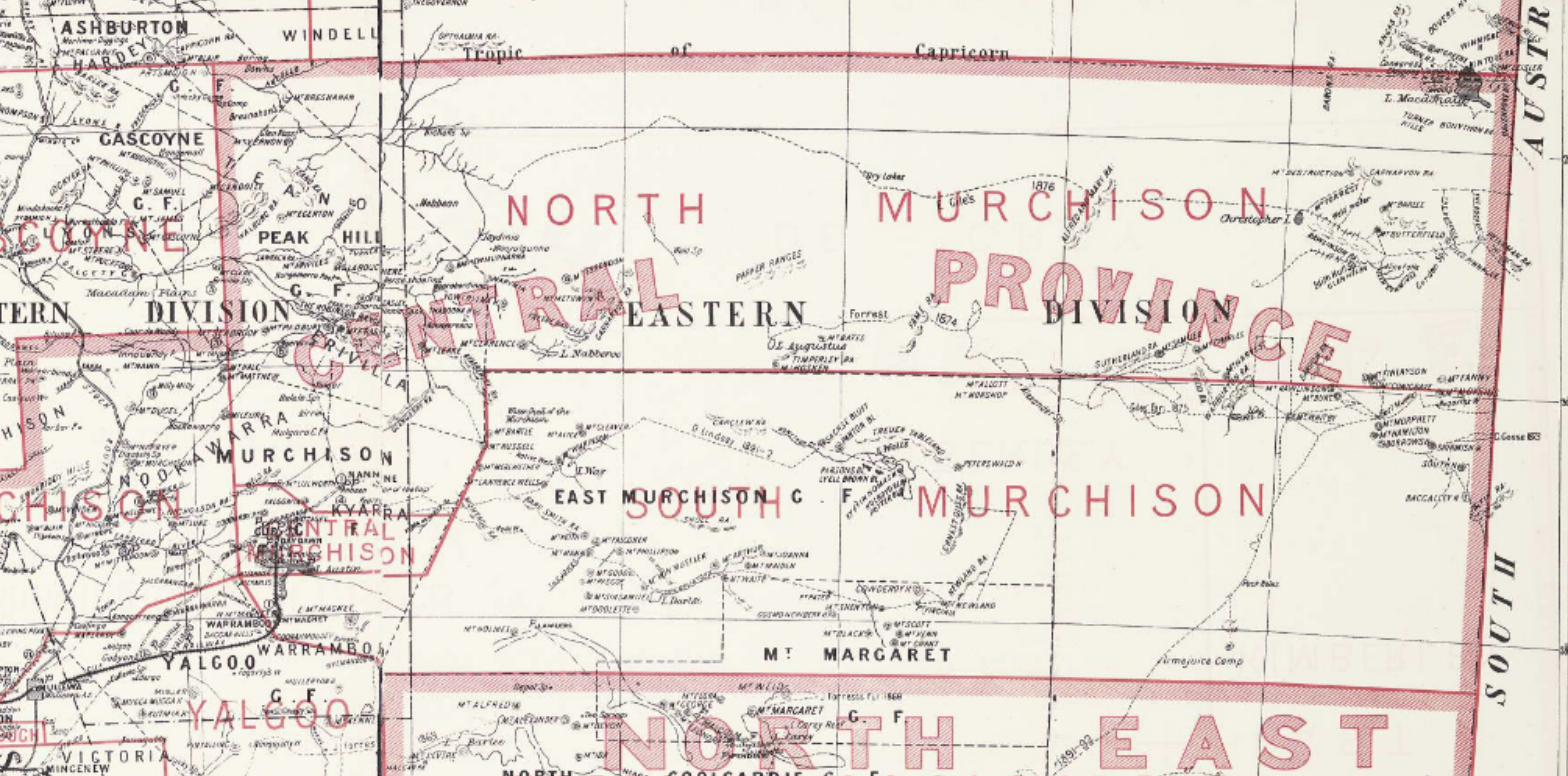
- South Murchison and surrounds, 1898
- State: Western Australia
- Dates current: 1897–1901
- Namesake: Murchison region

South Murchison was an electoral district of the Legislative Assembly in the Australian state of Western Australia from 1897 to 1901.

The district was located in the Western Australian outback. It existed for one term of parliament, and was created due to the large temporary population brought to the area by the brief Murchison gold rush. Its only member was Cornthwaite Rason, a Ministerial politician. In 1898, its major settlements were Mount Magnet and Lawlers, and it included the northern parts of the Mount Margaret goldfield. When the district was abolished ahead of the 1901 state election, Rason instead won election to the seat of Guildford, closer to Perth. Rason would later become Premier of Western Australia.

== Members for South Murchison ==
Member	Party	Term
Cornthwaite Rason	Ministerial	1897–1901
