= Ray Owen (politician) =

Australian politician

Raymond Cecil Owen

Member of the Legislative Assembly of Western Australia
- In office 29 April 1944 – 15 March 1947
- Preceded by: Richard Sampson
- Succeeded by: Gerald Wild
- Constituency: Swan
- In office 25 March 1950 – 31 March 1962
- Preceded by: None (new seat)
- Succeeded by: Ken Dunn
- Constituency: Darling Range

Personal details
- Born: 1 March 1905 Pickering Brook, Western Australia
- Died: 16 January 2003 (aged 97) Gooseberry Hill, Western Australia
- Party: Country (from 1950)
- Other political affiliations: Independent (to 1947)

Raymond Cecil Owen (1 March 1905 – 16 January 2003) was an Australian agricultural scientist and politician. He was a member of the Legislative Assembly of Western Australia from 1944 to 1947 and again from 1950 to 1962. Owen was initially elected as an independent, but joined the Country Party in 1949.

== Early life ==
Owen was born in Pickering Brook, Western Australia (on the outskirts of Perth), to Mary Ellen (née Passmore) and Oliver Edward Owen. He graduated from the University of Western Australia in 1923 with a diploma in agriculture, and later returned to university to complete a Bachelor of Science degree, which he received in 1934. Owen began working for the Agriculture Department in 1924, initially at the head office in Perth. He was later based for periods in Kalamunda, Manjimup, and Mount Barker. Owen worked for the Agriculture Department until entering parliament in 1944. He was also a part-time lecturer in horticulture at the University of Western Australia between 1935 and 1941, and from 1942 to 1944 was seconded to the federal Department of Commerce and Agriculture as an inspector of canned fruits and vegetables.

== Politics ==
Owen entered parliament at the 1944 Swan by-election, caused by the death of Richard Sampson. He stood as an Independent Country candidate, and polled 59.95 percent of the two-candidate-preferred vote to defeat Labor, Nationalist, and Country Party candidates. Owen ran as an independent at the 1947 state election, but lost his seat to Gerald Wild of the Liberal Party. Later in the year, he was elected to the Darling Range Road Board, which became the Shire of Kalamunda in 1961. He served as a councillor until 1965, including as either road board chairman or shire president for most of that time.

In 1949, Owen formally joined the Country Party. He stood in the new seat of Darling Range at the 1950 state election, and was elected by a narrow margin over a Liberal candidate. He increased his majority in 1953, and was re-elected unopposed in 1956 and with a large majority in 1959. However, at the 1962 election, Owen lost his seat to the Liberal Party's Ken Dunn in a three-cornered contest. On first preferences, Dunn beat Owen by just a single vote. He successfully petitioned the Court of Disputed Returns for the election to be overturned, but was again defeated by Dunn at the resulting by-election. Owen attempted to reclaim the seat at the 1965 state election, but was defeated a third time.

== Later life ==
After leaving parliament, Owen retired to his orchard. He was president of the Western Australian Fruitgrowers' Association from 1967 to 1970, and also contributed articles to agricultural journals. Owen died at a nursing home in Bicton in January 2003, aged 97. He had married Flora Margaret Hewison in 1933, with whom he had four children. At the time of his death, Owen was the oldest-lived member of the Parliament of Western Australia, after Eric Heenan, and the oldest-lived from the Legislative Assembly.

Parliament of Western Australia
Preceded by Richard Sampson	Member for Swan; 1944–1947	Succeeded by Gerald Wild
New seat	Member for Darling Range; 1950–1962	Succeeded by Ken Dunn
