= Gerald Wild =

Australian politician (1907–1996)

The Honourable Gerald Wild MBE AM ED

Member of the Legislative Assembly of Western Australia
- In office 15 March 1947 – 25 March 1950
- Preceded by: Ray Owen
- Succeeded by: None (abolished)
- Constituency: Swan
- In office 25 March 1950 – 16 March 1965
- Preceded by: None (new seat)
- Succeeded by: Cyril Rushton
- Constituency: Dale

Personal details
- Born: 2 January 1907 Chichester, Sussex, England
- Died: 11 October 1996 (aged 89) Booragoon, Western Australia
- Party: Liberal

Gerald Percy Wild MBE AM ED (2 January 1907 – 11 October 1996) was an Australian politician who served as a Liberal Party member of the Legislative Assembly of Western Australia from 1947 to 1965. He was a minister in the governments of Sir Ross McLarty and Sir David Brand, and later served as Agent-General for Western Australia from 1965 to 1971.

== Early life ==
Born on 2 January 1907, in Chichester, Sussex, to yeast merchant Edwin Percy and Alice Hilda Wild (née Heather), Wild was educated at Shoreham Grammar School. He emigrated to South Australia in 1923 as one of the Barwell Boys, as part of an assisted migration scheme. He was initially employed as a farm apprentice at Langhorne's Creek and Loxton, and then went to work in the mines at Broken Hill, New South Wales. Wild returned to South Australia in 1930, working at an ice works in Port Adelaide and at a mill in Moonta. In 1936, he went to the Western Australian goldfields, working at mines in Norseman and Kalgoorlie. In November 1939, Wild enlisted in the 2/11th Battalion. He saw service in the Middle East, Greece, and Crete, and was wounded in action in May 1941, gained the MBE (Military Division) in July 1941, and was mentioned in despatches in February 1942. By the end of the war Wild had reached the substantive rank of captain and the temporary rank of major, and was serving as a camp commandant in New Guinea.

== Politics and later life ==
Wild had been a member of the United Australia Party in South Australia prior to the war, and on returning to Western Australia joined the newly formed Liberal Party. Setting himself up as a businessman, he purchased property at Kenwick and Forrestdale, farming poultry and also establishing an electrical wholesale business. He stood for the Liberal Party in the seat of Swan at the 1947 state election, and successfully transferred to Dale at the 1950 election, after Swan was abolished in a redistribution. When the second McLarty–Watts government was sworn in on 6 April 1950, Wild was named assistant Minister for Forests (to Ross McLarty), assistant Minister for Mines (to Charles Simpson), and assistant Minister for Housing (to David Brand). In October 1950, he was made a full minister, with responsibility for the forests and housing portfolios (Simpson remained Minister for Mines).

The Liberals were defeated at the 1953 election, but regained power in 1959, under David Brand. In the Brand–Watts and Brand–Nalder coalition governments, Wild was Minister for Works and Minister for Water Supplies, and later also Minister for Labour (from 1962). He was reelected to parliament in 1965, but less than a month later resigned to take up the position of Agent-General for Western Australia. The resulting by-election was won by Cyril Rushton, a future deputy premier. Wild was agent-general until March 1971, when he was succeeded by another Liberal MP, William Bovell. In later life, he served on the boards of various Australian companies, including the Australian division of Taylor Woodrow, as well as sitting on the committee of the Western Australian Turf Club. Wild was made a Member of the Order of Australia (postnominals AM) in 1980, "for parliamentary service". He died in Booragoon, a suburb of Perth, on 11 October 1996, aged 89, and was buried at Karrakatta Cemetery. He had married Virginia Mary "Jean" Baxter in 1944.

== See also ==
- Members of the Western Australian Legislative Assembly

Parliament of Western Australia
Preceded by Ray Owen	Member for Swan; 1947–1950	Succeeded by seat abolished
Preceded by seat created	Member for Dale; 1950–1965	Succeeded by Cyril Rushton
Political offices
Preceded by Ross McLarty	Minister for Forests; 1950–1953	Succeeded by Herb Graham
Preceded by David Brand	Minister for Housing; 1950–1953	Succeeded by Herb Graham
Preceded by John Tonkin	Minister for Works; 1959–1965	Succeeded by Ross Hutchinson
Preceded by John Tonkin	Minister for Water Supplies; 1959–1965	Succeeded by Ross Hutchinson
Preceded by William Bovell	Minister for Labour; 1962–1965	Succeeded by Des O'Neil
