= James MacCallum Smith =

Australian politician (1868–1939)

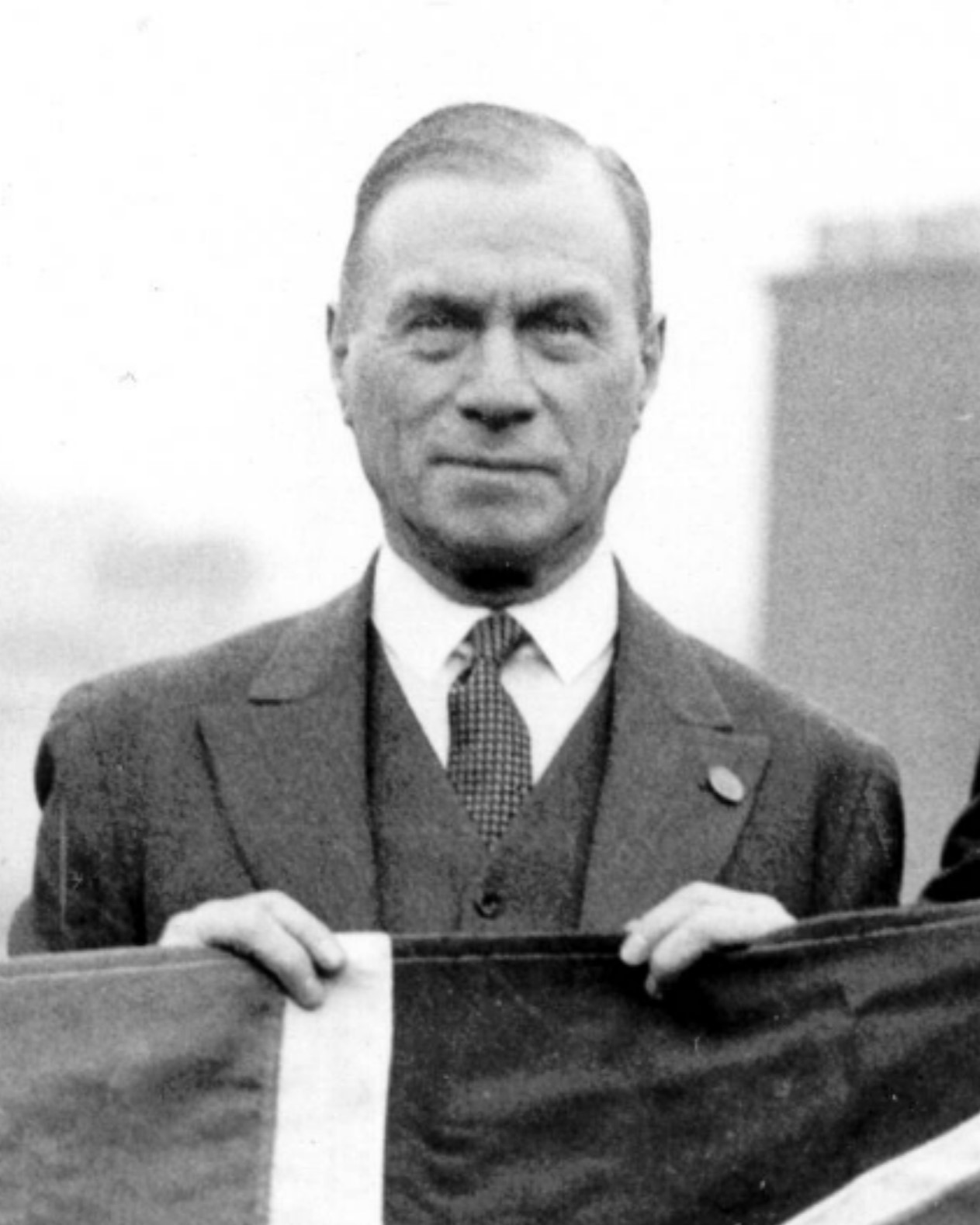
- Smith in 1934

Member of the Western Australian Legislative Assembly
- In office 2 October 1914 – 18 March 1939
- Constituency: North Perth

Personal details
- Born: 26 April 1868 Inverness, Scotland
- Died: 6 August 1939 (aged 71) Perth, Western Australia, Australia
- Party: Nationalist
- Spouses: Kate Lawrence (m. 1899; died 1937) Aileen Healy (m. 1937)
- Occupation: Newspaper editor

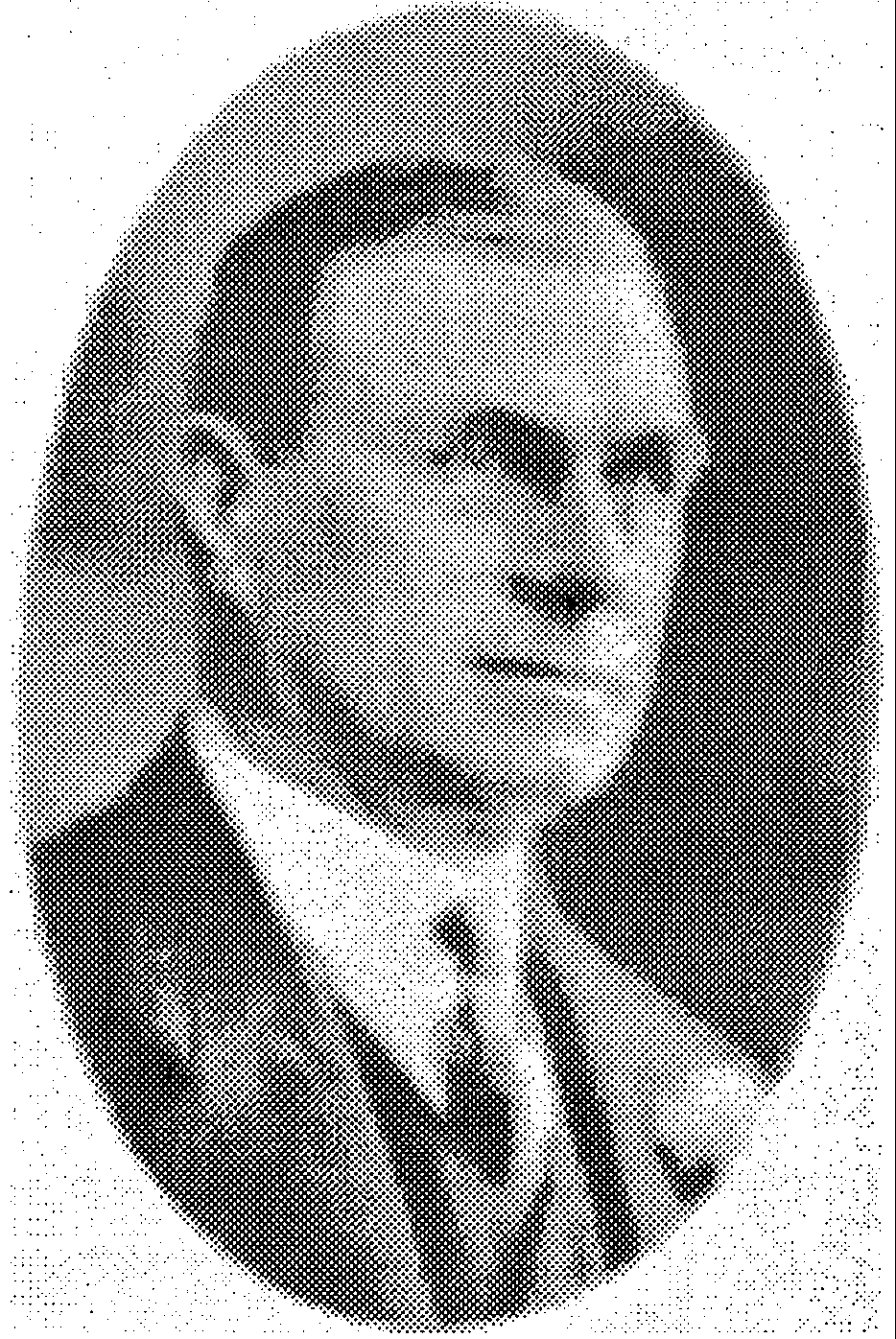
James MacCallum Smith

James MacCallum Smith (26 April 1868 – 6 August 1939) was an Australian politician, newspaper proprietor and stock breeder. He lobbied unsuccessfully for many years for the secession of Western Australia from the Federation of Australia.

== Early life ==
Smith was born on 26 April 1868 at Drumchardny, Inverness-shire, Scotland. He was the son of Helen (née McPherson) and James Smith; his father worked as a gamekeeper. He joined the staff of the Northern Chronicle in 1884.

== Journalism career ==
Some time later he emigrated to Australia, working briefly for a country newspaper in Queensland, then moving to Sydney to manage the Australian Mining Standard. In 1893 he moved to Coolgardie where he joined a consortium which purchased the Argus newspaper for £250. He sold his share a year later for £500 on the back of prosperity from recently discovered gold. Five years later the owners had refused an offer of £150,000 for a walk in-walk out sale of the paper.

In 1894, Smith partnered with Sidney Hocking in establishing the Golden Age and the West Australian Goldfields Courier. Two years later the pair established the Goldfields Morning Chronicle.

In 1898 he partnered with Arthur Reid in establishing the goldfields' first Sunday newspaper, the Sun. Two years later the two men purchased the Perth newspaper The Sunday Times from the estate of Frederick Vosper. MacCallum Smith bought out his partner in 1912 and remained as the sole proprietor and managing director until 1935.

== Politics ==
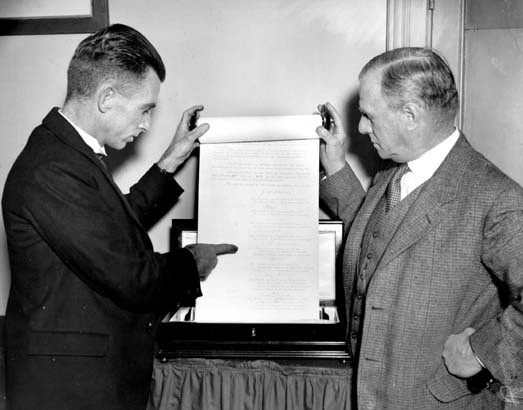
Keith Watson (left) and James MacCallum Smith (right), showing a page of the 1933 secession petition.

In the election of 5 September 1900, Smith contested a South Province seat in the Western Australian Legislative Council, but was unsuccessful. He contested the Western Australian Legislative Assembly seat of Coolgardie in the election of 24 April 1901, but was defeated by the incumbent, Alf Morgans. Thirteen years later, Smith contested the seat of North Perth in the election of 2 October 1914, and won it. He would hold the seat for over twenty years. He became active in the Dominion League, and in 1934 was part of the delegation that travelled to London to present the 1933 secession petition which had been passed with a two-thirds majority. The British Parliament refused the request however and the delegation returned home empty-handed.

== Personal life and other interests ==
MacCullum Smith was deputy chairman of the Western Australian Bank until its amalgamation with the Bank of New South Wales in 1927, and then became deputy chairman of the WA advisory board for the Bank of NSW. He later held numerous boardroom positions, including directorship of the Swan Portland Cement Company, the Eagle Star Insurance Company, and the Amalgamated Collieries of WA.

In his later life Smith became involved in stock breeding. He was owner of the Pindar Merino Stud at Canna and the Homebush Stud Farm at Cookernup, as well as a wheat farm at Koorda. He exhibited stud sheep, cattle and horses. In 1899, he married Kate Louise Lawrence. She died on 31 March 1937, and six months later he married Aileen Healey.

In the election of 18 March 1939 he lost his seat to Arthur Abbott. Less than five months later he died, on 6 August 1939 at the Hospital of St John of God, Subiaco, Western Australia. He was buried at Dunlichity cemetery in Scotland. His estate included an endowment for the creation of a MacCallum Smith chair of veterinary sciences at the University of Western Australia which was never utilised.
