= John Brady (Australian politician) =

Australian trade unionist and politician (1904–1993)

The Honourable John Brady

Member of the Legislative Assembly of Western Australia
- In office 13 March 1948 – 31 March 1962
- Preceded by: William Johnson
- Succeeded by: None (abolished)
- Constituency: Guildford-Midland
- In office 31 March 1962 – 30 March 1974
- Preceded by: None (new seat)
- Succeeded by: John Skidmore
- Constituency: Swan

Personal details
- Born: 19 January 1904 Highgate, Western Australia, Australia
- Died: 5 May 1993 (aged 89) Perth, Western Australia, Australia
- Party: Labor

John Joseph Brady (19 January 1904 – 5 May 1993) was an Australian trade unionist and politician who was a Labor Party member of the Legislative Assembly of Western Australia from 1948 to 1974. He served as a minister in the government of Albert Hawke.

Brady was born in Perth to Mary (née Fleming) and Thomas Brady. His family moved to Geraldton in 1911, where he attended Stella Maris College. After leaving school, he worked on the railways for a period and then in a flour mill in Dongara, where he eventually became acting manager. Brady moved back to Perth in 1929 and settled in Midland, where he became involved in the union movement. A secretary of the local trades hall, he was elected to the Midland Junction Municipal Council in 1934, and would serve until 1940. Brady first stood for parliament at a 1942 Legislative Council by-election for Metropolitan-Suburban Province, but was defeated by the Nationalist Party's candidate, Frank Gibson.

William Johnson, the sitting member for the seat of Guildford-Midland, died in office in January 1948. Brady entered parliament at the resulting by-election. He was appointed deputy chairman of committees in the Legislative Assembly after the 1953 state election, and elevated to the ministry after the 1956 election, as Minister for Native Welfare and Minister for Police. He served in the ministry until the Hawke government's defeat at the 1959 election. At the 1962 election, Guildford-Midland was abolished, and Brady successfully transferred to the new seat of Swan. He retired from parliament at the 1974 election, and died in Perth in May 1993, aged 89. He had married Winifred Anna Kilgren in 1929, with whom he had three children.

Parliament of Western Australia
| Preceded by William Johnson | Member for Guildford-Midland; 1948–1962 | Abolished |
| New seat | Member for Swan; 1962–1974 | Succeeded by John Skidmore |
Political offices
| Preceded by Bill Hegney | Minister for Native Welfare; 1956–1959 | Succeeded by Charles Perkins |
| Preceded by Herbert Styants | Minister for Police; 1956–1959 | Succeeded by Charles Perkins |
