= James Brebber =

Australian politician (1849–1936)

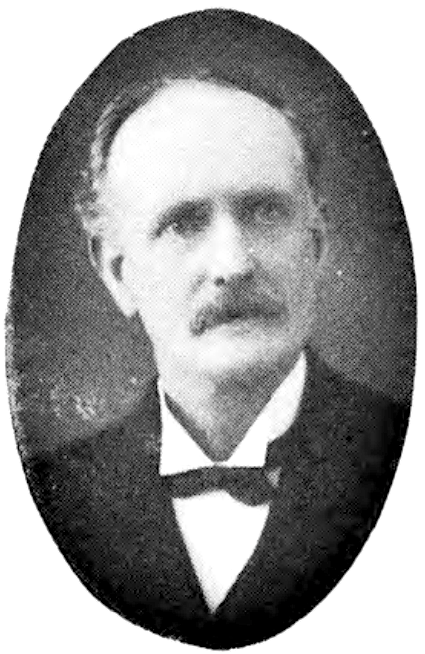

Member of the Legislative Assembly of Western Australia
- In office 27 October 1905 – 11 September 1908
- Preceded by: Francis Wilson
- Succeeded by: Herbert Swan
- Constituency: North Perth

Personal details
- Born: 14 October 1849 Strathdon, Aberdeenshire, Scotland
- Died: 30 January 1936 (aged 86) Perth, Western Australia

James Brebber (14 October 1849 – 30 January 1936) was an Australian politician who served as a member of the Legislative Assembly of Western Australia from 1905 to 1908, representing the seat of North Perth.

Brebber was born in Strathdon, Aberdeenshire, Scotland, to Katherine (née Grant) and George Forbes Brebber. He lived in Glasgow and London for periods, working as a builder, before emigrating to Western Australia in 1887. Brebber moved to Victoria the following year, but eventually returned to Western Australia in 1893, where he became a real estate agent in Perth. In 1897, he was elected to the Perth City Council, where he would serve until 1905. Brebber first stood for parliament at the 1904 state election, but was defeated in North Perth by the Labor Party's Francis Wilson. He recontested the seat at the 1905 election, and was successful. However, the Labor Party reclaimed the seat at the 1908 election, ending Brebber's career in politics. He died in Perth in January 1936, unmarried, and was buried at Karrakatta Cemetery.

Parliament of Western Australia
Preceded by Francis Wilson	Member for North Perth; 1905–1908	Succeeded by Herbert Swan
