= Electoral district of North Perth =

Former electoral district of Western Australia

North Perth Western Australia—Legislative Assembly
- State: Western Australia
- Dates current: 1897–1962
- Namesake: North Perth

The Electoral district of North Perth was a Legislative Assembly electorate in the state of Western Australia. The district was named for its location immediately to the north of the central business district of Perth.

North Perth was created under the Constitution Acts Amendment Act 1896, which took effect at the 1897 election. Its first election was notable in producing Western Australia's first Labor member of Parliament, Charles Oldham, who had been a president of the Trades and Labor Council and had become an employer, and hence could afford to run in the days prior to payment of members. Oldham associated with the official opposition led by George Leake, but ultimately his seat was declared vacant for non-attendance on 16 October 1900. An independent, Richard Speight, won at the subsequent general election four months later, but died seven months into his term.

The seat changed hands several times between Labor and non-Labor members until 1914, when James MacCallum Smith won the seat for the Liberal party, which folded into the Nationalist. He and his Nationalist successor Arthur Abbott were the seat's only members until a major redistribution following the abolition of the neighbouring Perth seat at the 1950 election transformed it into a marginal seat. Future Premier of Western Australia (1982–1983), Ray O'Connor, won his first term of office against the incumbent Labor member Stan Lapham in the 1959 election. The seat was abolished in a redistribution in 1961 ahead of the 1962 election, and the seat was split between a recreated Perth seat and Mount Lawley.

== Members for North Perth ==
Member	Party	Term
Charles Oldham	PLP (Labour)	1897–1900
Richard Speight	Independent	1901
George McWilliams	Oppositionist	1901–1904
Francis Ford Wilson	Labour	1904–1905
James Brebber	Ministerialist	1905–1908
Herbert Swan	Labour	1908–1914
James MacCallum Smith	Liberal	1914–1917
James MacCallum Smith	Nationalist	1917–1939
Arthur Abbott	Nationalist	1939–1945
Arthur Abbott	Liberal	1945–1949
Arthur Abbott	LCL	1949–1950
Ted Needham	Labor	1950–1953
Stan Lapham	Labor	1953–1959
Ray O'Connor	LCL	1959–1962
