= Francis Ford Wilson =

Australian politician

Francis Wilson

Member of the Legislative Assembly of Western Australia
- In office 28 June 1904 – 27 October 1905
- Preceded by: George McWilliams
- Succeeded by: James Brebber
- Constituency: North Perth

Personal details
- Born: 29 October 1865 Creswick, Victoria, Australia
- Died: 17 June 1919 (aged 53) Greenmount, Western Australia, Australia
- Party: Labor

Francis Ford Wilson (29 October 1865 – 17 June 1919) was an Australian trade unionist and politician who served as a member of the Legislative Assembly of Western Australia from 1905 to 1908, representing the seat of North Perth.

Wilson was born near Creswick, Victoria. He worked variously as a blacksmith, wheelwright, and coachbuilder, living for periods in Melbourne and in Morwell. He served as president of the Victorian Coachbuilders' Union in 1901, and after moving to Western Australia in 1903 helped to re-establish a branch of the union there. At the 1904 state election, Wilson was elected to the seat of North Perth for the Labor Party, replacing George McWilliams. However, his time in parliament was short-lived, as he was defeated by James Brebber at the 1905 election. He later served on the North Perth Municipal Council from 1909 to 1914. In June 1919, Wilson contracted Spanish flu. He was placed into quarantine at Blackboy Hill, but died on the night of his arrival. Wilson had married Annie Andrew in 1887, with whom he had six children.

Parliament of Western Australia
Preceded by George McWilliams	Member for North Perth; 1904–1905	Succeeded by James Brebber
