= William Ralph Nairn =

Australian politician

William Ralph Nairn (1873/4 – 1960) was an Australian politician. He was a member of Swan in the Western Australian Legislative Assembly from 1914 to 1921, representing the Liberal Party and then the Nationalist Party.

His brother, Walter Nairn, was a member of the Australian House of Representatives and federal Speaker of the House.
