= William Dartnell Johnson =

Australian politician

William Johnson
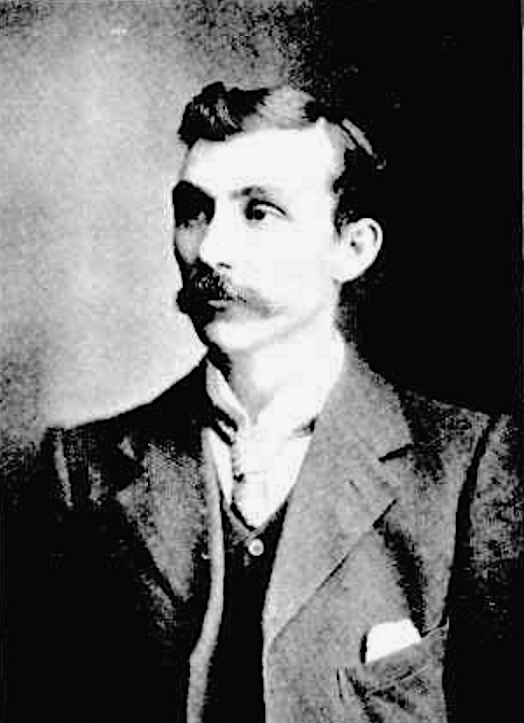
- Johnson, c. 1905

12th Speaker of the Legislative Assembly of Western Australia
- In office 4 August 1938 – 2 August 1939
- Preceded by: Alexander Panton
- Succeeded by: Joseph Sleeman

Leader of the Opposition and Leader of the Labor Party in Western Australia
- In office 4 – 27 October 1905
- Premier: Hector Rason
- Preceded by: Henry Daglish
- Succeeded by: Thomas Bath

Member of the Legislative Assembly of Western Australia
- In office 24 April 1901 – 27 October 1905
- Preceded by: None (new seat)
- Succeeded by: Norbert Keenan
- Constituency: Kalgoorlie
- In office 16 July 1906 – 29 September 1917
- Preceded by: Hector Rason
- Succeeded by: Joseph Davies
- Constituency: Guildford
- In office 22 March 1924 – 12 April 1930
- Preceded by: Joseph Davies
- Succeeded by: None (abolished)
- Constituency: Guildford
- In office 12 April 1930 – 26 January 1948
- Preceded by: None (new seat)
- Succeeded by: John Brady
- Constituency: Guildford-Midland

Personal details
- Born: 9 October 1870 Wanganui, New Zealand
- Died: 26 January 1948 (aged 77) Subiaco, Western Australia
- Party: Labor

William Dartnell Johnson (9 October 1870 – 26 January 1948) was an Australian politician who was prominent in state politics in Western Australia for most of the first half of the 20th century. A member of the Labor Party, he served in the Legislative Assembly on three occasions – from 1901 to 1905, then again from 1906 to 1917, and finally from 1924 until his death. Johnson was elected leader of the Labor Party (and thus leader of the opposition) in October 1905, but three weeks later lost his own seat at the 1905 state election. He had previously been a minister in the government of Henry Daglish (from August 1904 to August 1905), and later returned to the ministry under John Scaddan (from October 1911 to July 1916). Towards the end of his career, Johnson also served just under a year as Speaker of the Legislative Assembly, from 1938 to 1939.

== Early life ==
William Dartnell Johnson was born on 9 October 1870 in Whanganui, New Zealand. His father was George Groheim Johnson, a plumber, and his mother, Elizabeth Ann McCormish. He went to the Turakina State School in Turakina until the age of thirteen.

From the age of thirteen to the age of sixteen, he worked in a post office. He then worked as a carpenter, emigrating to Western Australia in 1894, at the age of twenty-four. A year later, he moved to the Goldfields, settling in Kalgoorlie.

There, he founded the Kalgoorlie branch of the Amalgamated Society of Carpenters and Joiners, and he served as its first President. He also helped establish the Kalgoorlie, Boulder and District Trades and Labor Council, and served as its secretary for two years. He then served as the first business manager of the Westralian Worker, a newspaper in Kalgoorlie.

== Politics ==
He became a member of the Labor Party. From 1901 to 1905, he served as the Labor MLA for the Electoral district of Kalgoorlie in the Western Australian Legislative Assembly. During his tenure, he spearheaded the Midland Railway Workshops. In 1904, he served as Western Australia's Minister for Works, and later as regional Minister for Mines and Railways. He then became the leader of the Western Australian Labor Party, but quit his role in October 1905.

From 1906 to 1917, he served as MLA for the Electoral district of Guildford in the Western Australian Legislative Assembly. In October 1911, he began a term as Minister for Works, and from November 1914 he served as Minister for Lands and Agriculture. In the assembly, his proposal to build a railway line going North from Esperance, Western Australia rejected. In January 1915, he helped pass the Industries Assistance Act to help farmers whose livelihood had been jeopardized by the recent drought. However, he lost his ministerial portfolio as a result of the Nevanas affair. Moreover, he lost his seat in the assembly to Joseph Davies (1866-1954) as a result of his opposition to the conscription of Western Australians in the First World War.

From 1924 to 1930, he served again as MLA for the Electoral district of Guildford in the Western Australian Legislative Assembly, and from 1930 to 1940 as MLA for the Electoral district of Guildford-Midland. He also served as Speaker of the Assembly from August 1938 to August 1939, and as chairman of the parliamentary party from 1924 to 1948. He was a 'state socialist' and rejected the proposed secession of Western Australia.

He was a freemason.

== Personal life ==
On 27 November 1901, he married Jessie Elizabeth Stewart, née McCallum, who had been recently widowed. They had a son and three daughters.

== Death ==
He died on 26 January 1948, and he was buried in the Karrakatta Cemetery in Perth.
