= Electoral district of Guildford =

Former electoral district in Perth, Western Australia

Guildford Western Australia—Legislative Assembly
- State: Western Australia
- Dates current: 1901–1962^{1}
- Namesake: Guildford

Footnotes
- ^{1} known as Guildford-Midland 1930–1962

Guildford was an electoral district of the Legislative Assembly in the Australian state of Western Australia from 1901 to 1962.

Known as Guildford-Midland from 1930 onwards, the district was located in the north-eastern suburbs of Perth.

== History ==
First created for the 1901 state election, the district's first member was Hector Rason, who had already served a term as the member for South Murchison from 1897. Rason was Premier of Western Australia from August 1905 to May 1906.

Rason was succeeded by William Johnson of the Labor Party. Johnson's tenure as a parliamentarian was a long one: he was the district's member from 1906 to 1917 and again from 1924 until his death in 1948. Johnson was succeeded at a by-election by Labor candidate John Brady. When the district was abolished, Brady transferred to the new seat of Swan at the 1962 state election.

== Members ==
Guildford (1901–1930)
Member	Party	Term
Hector Rason	Opposition	1901–1904
Hector Rason	Ministerial	1904–1906
William Johnson	Labor	1906–1917
Joseph Davies	National Labor	1917–1924
William Johnson	Labor	1924–1930
Guildford-Midland (1930–1962)
William Johnson	Labor	1930–1948
John Brady	Labor	1948–1962
