= Electoral district of Swan =

Former electoral district of Western Australia

Swan Western Australia—Legislative Assembly
- State: Western Australia
- Dates current: 1890–1950; 1962–1983
- Namesake: Swan Valley

Swan was an electoral district of the Legislative Assembly in the Australian state of Western Australia from 1890 to 1950 and again from 1962 to 1983.

The district was located in the Swan Valley, to the east of Perth. The district was one of the original 30 seats contested at the 1890 election. It was abolished ahead of the 1950 election, at which point incumbent member Gerald Wild of the Liberal Party became the member for the new seat of Dale. Revived for the 1962 election, it was won by John Brady of the Labor Party, hitherto the member for Guildford-Midland. Swan was again abolished at the 1983 election, whence incumbent member Gordon Hill of the Labor Party won the new seat of Helena.

== Members ==
Swan (1890–1950)
Member	Party	Term
William Loton	Non-aligned	1890–1897
Norman Ewing	Independent	1897–1901
Mathieson Jacoby	Independent	1901–1905
Arthur Gull	Ministerial	1905–1908
Mathieson Jacoby	Ministerial	1908–1911
Philip Turvey	Labor	1911–1914
William Nairn	Liberal	1914–1917
William Nairn	Nationalist	1917–1921
Richard Sampson	Country	1921–1923
Richard Sampson	Country (MCP)	1923–1924
Richard Sampson	Nationalist	1924–1931
Richard Sampson	Country	1931–1944
Ray Owen	Independent Country	1944–1947
Gerald Wild	Liberal	1947–1949
Gerald Wild	LCL	1949–1950
Swan (1962–1983)
Member	Party	Term
John Brady	Labor	1962–1974
Jack Skidmore	Labor	1974–1981
Jack Skidmore	Independent	1981–1982
Gordon Hill	Labor	1982–1983
