= Hector Rason =

Australian politician (1858–1927)

Sir Hector Rason
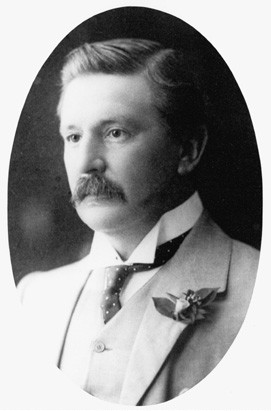

7th Premier of Western Australia
- In office 25 August 1905 – 7 May 1906
- Monarch: Edward VII
- Governor: Sir Frederick Bedford
- Preceded by: Henry Daglish
- Succeeded by: Sir Newton Moore
- Constituency: South Murchison (1897–1901), Guildford (1901–1906)

Personal details
- Born: 18 June 1858 Cleeve, Somerset, England
- Died: 15 March 1927 (aged 68) Beckenham, Kent, England
- Party: Unaligned
- Spouse: Mary E. Terry

Sir Cornthwaite Hector William James Rason (18 June 1858 – 15 March 1927), better known as Hector Rason, was the seventh Premier of Western Australia.

== Early life ==
Rason was born on 18 June 1858 in Cleeve, Somerset, England. He was the son of Sarah Ann (née Linington) and Cornthwaite Hector Rason. His father was a Royal Navy surgeon who had previously practised in Western Australia.

Rason was educated at Brighton and Reading. His father died in 1873. After a period working as a railway clerk, he immigrated to Western Australia in 1881. He went into partnership with Charles Dempster, a storekeeper at Newcastle (now Toodyay). Rason later managed a store at Guildford. He profited from the gold rush to the Kimberley in 1886, but by 1891 he was experiencing financial difficulties and Rason, Webster & Co. was placed into liquidation.

== Business career ==
In October 1880, Rason emigrated to Perth, Australia, but returned to England after eighteen months. In February 1883, he married Mary E. Terry, and shortly afterwards returned to Western Australia with his wife and her brother, W. R. Terry. Rason and Terry set up business as storekeepers at Toodyay and Guildford, but after a few years Terry returned to England. Rason then went into partnership with a Mr Webster, and attempted to benefit from the gold rushes in the Kimberley and Goldfields regions. Rason also spent some time in Coolgardie trading as a mining engineer and auctioneer. In July 1889, while already a member of the Western Australian Legislative Council, he became the inaugural president of the newly-formed Stock Exchange of Perth. He retired from business in 1891, but was affected by the firm's bankruptcy in 1892. From 1893 to 1895 he was a mining agent and auctioneer in Coolgardie, and in 1896 he moved to Mount Magnet. From 1897 to 1898, Rason was Mayor of the Municipality of Guildford.

== Politics ==
In January 1889, Rason was elected to the Western Australian Legislative Council for the Swan district. He was a strong supporter of responsible government, and left the Council in October 1890 after responsible government had been established. In 1897 he was elected to the Western Australian Legislative Assembly seat of South Murchison, sitting as a supporter of Sir John Forrest's government. In 1898, he was appointed president of the royal commission on mining. The seat of South Murchison was abolished in 1901, and Rason won the Legislative Assembly seat of Guildford in the general elections of April 1901. When George Leake formed his second government in December 1901, Rason was appointed minister for works, holding responsibility for administration of the Coolgardie Water Scheme. Under Walter James' premiership from July 1902 until August 1904, he was minister for works and railways, and was also treasurer for a few months from April 1904. After Labor took office in August 1904, he became Leader of the Opposition.

Rason became Premier, Treasurer and Minister for Justice on 25 August 1905, after Henry Daglish's Labor government was defeated. Like Daglish, Rason did not have a majority of support, but he was granted an early dissolution in October, and easily won the subsequent general election. Later that year he headed the royal commission on immigration.

== Later life ==
Rason did not provide firm leadership as premier, and was dogged by family and financial worries. In May 1906 he appointed himself as Agent General for Western Australia in London before resigning as premier to take up the post, an action which drew strong criticism. He held the post until 1911, after which he pursued a business career in Britain. He also became Chairman of the Bode Rubber Estates (1914) Ltd., a company which cultivated natural rubber in British North Borneo. He was made Knight Bachelor in 1909.

== Personal life ==
In 1883, Rason married Mary Evelina Terry. The couple had six children, two of whom predeceased him. He died of cancer in Beckenham, Kent, on 15 March 1927.

Political offices
Preceded by Henry Daglish	Premier of Western Australia; 1905–1906	Succeeded by Sir Newton Moore
Western Australian Legislative Assembly
Preceded by Seat created	Member for South Murchison; 1897–1901	Succeeded by Seat abolished
Preceded by Seat created	Member for Guildford; 1901–1906	Succeeded by William Johnson
