= Electoral results for the district of Coolgardie =

Western Australian district election results

This is a list of electoral results for the Electoral district of Coolgardie in Western Australian state elections.

== Members for Coolgardie ==
Members	Party	Term
Alf Morgans	Ministerial	1897–1904
Henry Augustus Ellis	Labor	1904–1905
Henry Augustus Ellis	Independent Labor	1905
William Eddy	Ministerial	1905–1908
Charles McDowall	Labor	1908–1916
George Lambert	Labor	1916–1930

== Election results ==
=== Elections in the 1920s ===
1927 Western Australian state election: Coolgardie
Party	Candidate	Votes	%	±%
Labor	George Lambert	477	69.9	−30.1
Nationalist	William Vale	205	30.1	+30.1
Total formal votes		682	99.3	
Informal votes		5	0.7	
Turnout		687	72.4	
Labor hold		Swing	N/A	

1924 Western Australian state election: Coolgardie
Party	Candidate	Votes	%	±%
Labor	George Lambert	unopposed		
Labor hold		Swing		

1921 Western Australian state election: Coolgardie
Party	Candidate	Votes	%	±%
Labor	George Lambert	565	60.8	+6.9
National Labor	Peter Wedd	222	23.9	−9.0
Independent	William Faahan	143	15.4	+15.4
Total formal votes		930	97.5	−0.5
Informal votes		24	2.5	+0.5
Turnout		954	66.3	−5.6
Labor hold		Swing	N/A	

- Preferences were not distributed.

=== Elections in the 1910s ===
1917 Western Australian state election: Coolgardie
Party	Candidate	Votes	%	±%
Labor	George Lambert	744	53.9	–46.1
National Labor	Albert Pascoe	455	33.0	+33.0
National Labor	Samuel Scotson	182	13.2	+13.2
Total formal votes		1,381	98.0	n/a
Informal votes		28	2.0	n/a
Turnout		1,409	71.9	n/a
Labor hold		Swing	–46.1	

- The previous Labor candidate, Charles McDowall, had been elected unopposed in 1914.

1916 Coolgardie state by-election
Party	Candidate	Votes	%	±%
Labor	George Lambert	1,164	71.9	N/A
Independent	Donald MacPherson	340	21.0	+21.0
Independent	John Boileau	115	7.1	+7.1
Total formal votes		1,619	N/A	N/A
Informal votes		N/A	N/A	N/A
Turnout		N/A	N/A	N/A
Labor hold		Swing	N/A	

1914 Western Australian state election: Coolgardie
Party	Candidate	Votes	%	±%
Labor	Charles McDowall	unopposed		
Labor hold		Swing		

1911 Western Australian state election: Coolgardie
Party	Candidate	Votes	%	±%
Labor	Charles McDowall	1,348	62.7	
Independent	Henry Augustus Ellis	802	37.3	
Total formal votes		2,150	99.6	
Informal votes		9	0.4	
Turnout		2,159	71.9	
Labor hold		Swing		

=== Elections in the 1900s ===
1908 Western Australian state election: Coolgardie
Party	Candidate	Votes	%	±%
Labour	Charles McDowall	1,010	60.1	+25.6
Ministerialist	William Eddy	670	39.9	+3.9
Total formal votes		1,680	99.3	+3.0
Informal votes		12	0.7	−3.0
Turnout		1,692	89.7	+33.4
Labour gain from Ministerialist		Swing	N/A	

1906 Coolgardie state by-election
Party	Candidate	Votes	%	±%
Ministerialist	William Eddy	1,051	52.5	+16.5
Labor	Charles McDowall	951	47.5	+13.0
Total formal votes		2,002	99.2	+2.9
Informal votes		17	0.8	−2.9
Turnout		2,019	73.4	+17.1
Ministerialist hold		Swing	N/A	

1905 Western Australian state election: Coolgardie
Party	Candidate	Votes	%	±%
Ministerialist	William Eddy	544	36.0	–5.5
Labour	Charles McDowall	521	34.5	–24.0
Independent Labour	Henry Augustus Ellis	446	29.5	+29.5
Total formal votes		1,511	96.3	–2.9
Informal votes		58	0.8	+2.9
Turnout		1,569	56.3	–3.4
Ministerialist gain from Independent Labour		Swing	–5.5	

1904 Western Australian state election: Coolgardie
Party	Candidate	Votes	%	±%
Labour	Henry Augustus Ellis	1,159	58.5	+58.5
Ministerialist	William Eddy	821	41.5	+41.5
Total formal votes		1,980	99.2	–0.7
Informal votes		15	0.8	+0.7
Turnout		1,995	59.7	+19.6
Labour gain from Ministerialist		Swing	+58.5	

1901 Western Australian state election: Coolgardie
Party	Candidate	Votes	%	±%
Ministerialist	Alfred Morgans	811	50.8	–20.0
Labour	Peter Wedd	414	25.9	+25.9
Opposition	James MacCallum Smith	372	23.3	+23.3
Total formal votes		1,597	99.2	+1.4
Informal votes		13	0.8	–1.4
Turnout		1,610	43.2	+1.9
Ministerialist hold		Swing	–20.0	

=== Elections in the 1890s ===
1897 Western Australian colonial election: Coolgardie
Party	Candidate	Votes	%	±%
Ministerialist	Alf Morgans	595	70.8	
Opposition	Alfred Hales	245	29.2	
Total formal votes		840	97.8	
Informal votes		19	2.2	
Turnout		859	41.3	
Ministerialist hold		Swing		
