= Electoral results for the district of Yilgarn =

Western Australian district election results

This is a list of electoral results for the Electoral district of Yilgarn in Western Australian state elections.

== Members for Yilgarn ==
Members	Party	Term
Charles Moran	Non-aligned	1894–1897
William Oats	Independent	1897–1904
Austin Horan	Labor	1904–1911
Austin Horan	Independent	1911
Charles Hudson	Labor	1911–1916
Charles Hudson	National Labor	1916–1921
Edwin Corboy	Labor	1921–1930

== Election results ==
=== Elections in the 1920s ===
1927 Western Australian state election: Yilgarn
Party	Candidate	Votes	%	±%
Labor	Edwin Corboy	607	54.5	−3.9
Country	John Blake	394	35.4	+19.3
Country	Arthur Brown	112	10.1	+10.1
Total formal votes		1,113	98.4	−1.2
Informal votes		18	1.6	+1.2
Turnout		1,131	81.4	+5.1
Labor hold		Swing	N/A	

- Preferences were not distributed.

1924 Western Australian state election: Yilgarn
Party	Candidate	Votes	%	±%
Labor	Edwin Corboy	409	58.4	+10.4
Nationalist	Austin Allom	134	19.1	+19.1
Executive Country	Thomas Hamerston	113	16.1	+16.1
Executive Country	Christian Andre	45	6.4	+6.4
Total formal votes		701	99.6	+2.5
Informal votes		3	0.4	−2.5
Turnout		704	76.3	
Labor hold		Swing	N/A	

- Preferences were not distributed.

1921 Western Australian state election: Yilgarn
Party	Candidate	Votes	%	±%
Labor	Edwin Corboy	358	48.0	+9.6
National Labor	Charles Hudson	222	29.8	−4.5
Country	Maurice Solomon	166	22.2	+22.2
Total formal votes		746	97.1	−1.5
Informal votes		22	2.9	+1.5
Turnout		768	72.1	−1.4
Two-candidate-preferred result
Labor	Edwin Corboy	397	53.2	+9.5
National Labor	Charles Hudson	349	46.8	−9.5
Labor gain from National Labor		Swing	+9.5	

=== Elections in the 1910s ===
1917 Western Australian state election: Yilgarn
Party	Candidate	Votes	%	±%
Labor	Alick McCallum	430	38.4	+38.4
National Labor	Charles Hudson	384	34.3	–26.2
Nationalist	Archibald McIntyre	244	21.8	–17.6
Nationalist	John Dunstan	62	5.5	+5.5
Total formal votes		1,120	98.6	–0.4
Informal votes		16	1.4	+0.4
Turnout		1,136	73.5	+9.3
Two-party-preferred result
National Labor	Charles Hudson	631	56.3	–4.3
Labor	Alick McCallum	489	43.7	+43.7
National Labor hold		Swing	N/A	

1914 Western Australian state election: Yilgarn
Party	Candidate	Votes	%	±%
Labor	Charles Hudson	803	60.6	−2.0
Liberal	Archibald McIntyre	523	39.4	+39.4
Total formal votes		1,326	99.0	−0.8
Informal votes		13	1.0	+0.8
Turnout		1,339	64.2	−2.8
Labor hold		Swing	N/A	

1911 Western Australian state election: Yilgarn
Party	Candidate	Votes	%	±%
Labor	Charles Hudson	1,058	62.6	
Independent	Austin Horan	633	37.4	
Total formal votes		1,691	99.8	
Informal votes		3	0.2	
Turnout		1,694	67.0	
Labor hold		Swing		

=== Elections in the 1900s ===
1908 Western Australian state election: Yilgarn
Party	Candidate	Votes	%	±%
Labour	Austin Horan	676	90.5	+31.8
Ministerialist	William Allen	71	9.5	+9.5
Total formal votes		747	99.2	+0.7
Informal votes		6	0.8	−0.7
Turnout		753	35.9	−7.5
Labour hold		Swing	N/A	

1905 Western Australian state election: Yilgarn
Party	Candidate	Votes	%	±%
Labour	Austin Horan	517	58.7	–2.9
Independent Labour	Fergie Reid	364	41.3	+41.3
Total formal votes		881	99.5	+0.6
Informal votes		13	0.5	–0.6
Turnout		894	43.4	+13.4
Labour hold		Swing	–2.9	

1904 Western Australian state election: Yilgarn
Party	Candidate	Votes	%	±%
Labour	Austin Horan	1,172	61.6	+30.2
Ministerialist	William Hedges	732	38.4	+38.4
Total formal votes		1,904	98.9	–0.5
Informal votes		21	1.1	+0.5
Turnout		1,925	30.0	–17.6
Labour gain from Opposition		Swing	+30.2	

1901 Western Australian state election: Yilgarn
Party	Candidate	Votes	%	±%
Opposition	William Oats	186	39.7	–11.2
Labour	Richard Sneddon	147	31.4	+31.4
Ministerialist	Isidor Cohn	74	15.8	–23.6
Independent	William Montgomery	61	13.0	+13.0
Total formal votes		468	99.4	+4.0
Informal votes		3	0.6	–4.0
Turnout		471	47.6	+0.1
Opposition hold		Swing	N/A	

=== Elections in the 1890s ===
1897 Western Australian colonial election: Yilgarn
Party	Candidate	Votes	%	±%
Independent	William Oats	115	50.9	
Ministerialist	Isidor Cohn	89	39.4	
Opposition	George Leckie	22	9.7	
Total formal votes		226	95.4	
Informal votes		11	4.6	
Turnout		237	47.5	
Independent hold		Swing		
