= Electoral results for the district of Dundas (Western Australia) =

Western Australian district election results

This is a list of electoral results for the Electoral district of Dundas in Western Australian state elections.

== Members for Dundas ==
Member	Party	Term
John Conolly	Independent	1897–1901
Albert Thomas	Independent	1901–1905
Charles Hudson	Labor	1905–1911

== Election results ==
=== Elections in the 1900s ===
1908 Western Australian state election: Dundas
Party	Candidate	Votes	%	±%
Labour	Charles Hudson	831	59.9	+21.6
Independent	Albert Thomas	557	40.1	+3.0
Total formal votes		1,388	99.1	+0.4
Informal votes		12	0.9	−0.4
Turnout		1,400	79.6	+18.1
Labour hold		Swing	N/A	

1905 Western Australian state election: Dundas
Party	Candidate	Votes	%	±%
Labour	Charles Hudson	382	38.3	–7.7
Independent	Albert Thomas	370	37.1	–16.9
Independent Labour	Robert Stewart	245	24.6	+24.6
Total formal votes		997	98.7	–0.5
Informal votes		13	1.3	+0.5
Turnout		1,010	61.5	–3.3
Labour gain from Independent		Swing	–5.5	

1904 Western Australian state election: Dundas
Party	Candidate	Votes	%	±%
Independent	Albert Thomas	695	54.0	+11.7
Labour	Robert Stewart	592	46.0	+20.6
Total formal votes		1,287	99.2	+3.4
Informal votes		10	0.8	–3.4
Turnout		1,297	64.8	+9.9
Independent hold		Swing	+11.7	

1901 Western Australian state election: Dundas
Party	Candidate	Votes	%	±%
Independent	Albert Thomas	348	42.3	+42.3
Independent	Robert Stewart	209	25.4	+25.4
Labour	Thomas Beattie	194	23.5	+23.5
Opposition	Cyrus McFarlane	73	8.9	+8.9
Total formal votes		824	95.8	+1.4
Informal votes		36	4.2	–1.4
Turnout		860	54.9	–19.1
Independent hold		Swing	N/A	

=== Elections in the 1890s ===
1897 Western Australian colonial election: Dundas
Party	Candidate	Votes	%	±%
Ind. Ministerialist	John Conolly	85	41.7	
Opposition	Edward Harney	72	35.3	
Independent	Arthur Austin	47	23.0	
Total formal votes		204	94.4	
Informal votes		12	5.6	
Turnout		216	74.0	
Ind. Ministerialist hold		Swing		
