= History of West Australia =

Book compiled by Warren Bert Kimberly

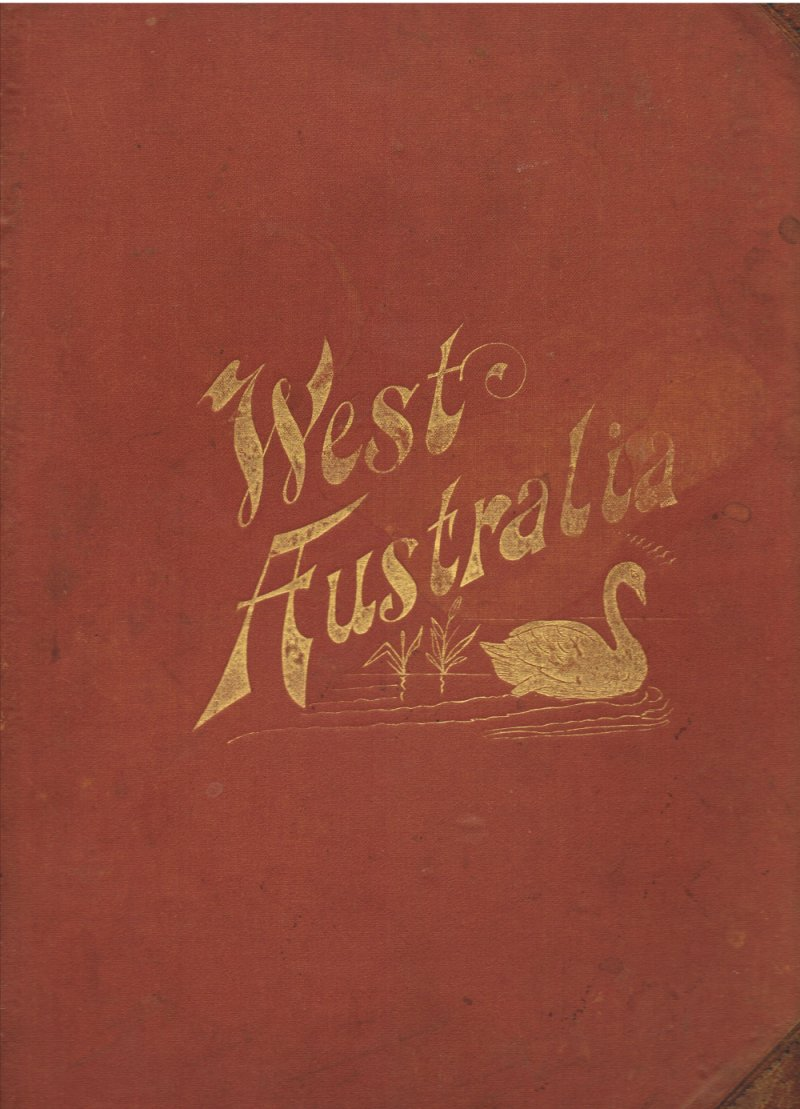
Cover

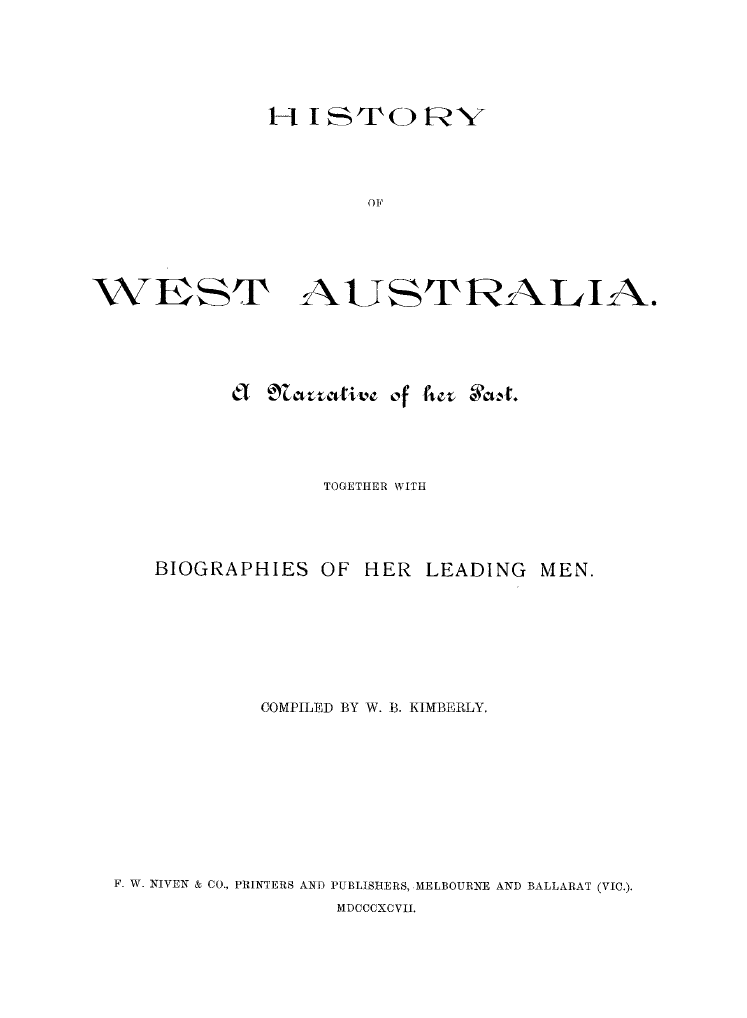
Frontispiece

History of West Australia: A Narrative Of Her Past Together With Biographies Of Her Leading Men is a folio size book of 250 mm × 320 mm (9.8 in × 12.6 in), compiled by W. B. Kimberly over a period of 18 months, and published in 1897.

Due to its age, all of the material in the book is in the public domain and may be freely reproduced.

== Description ==
Kimberly, an American, came to Australia from Chicago in the mid-1880s and edited commemorative histories of the gold mining towns of Ballarat and Bendigo, both published by F. W. Niven & Co. in Melbourne. In late 1895 he approached John Forrest with a proposal for a similar project if the Government of Western Australia would make a £2,000, equivalent to A$363,000 in 2022, subsidy grant. Forrest countered with an offer that the government would guarantee the purchase of 100 of the completed books. Kimberly accepted and with assistant and Melbourne journalist J. J. Pascoe completed the 340,000 word project in 18 months.

The book consists of two parts: The first (and larger) section up to page 348 deals with the history of Western Australia from the earliest European hypotheses of the country's existence in the 14th century through to May of the year of publication (1897), including extensive detail on European exploration across the state from 1829. (Note: Including details of attitudes towards the Aboriginal population prevalent at the time.) Two appendices which are essentially essays, follow and deal mainly with gold and the gold mining industry which was the dominant social and economic factor in the state at the time of publication.

The second section is a volume of 163 biographies of notable Western Australians. Page numbering restarts from 1 through to 236 and typically include several pages of text as well as a large portrait photo for each entry.

== History ==
- CHAPTER I. – The Discovery of Australia
- CHAPTER II. – The Discovery of Australia (Continued)
- CHAPTER III. – The Aborigines
- CHAPTER IV. – Western Australia Annexed
- CHAPTER V. – Foundation of the Colony
- CHAPTER VI. – Perth and Fremantle Founded, and Progress in 1829
- CHAPTER VII. – Incidents and Progress in 1830
- CHAPTER VIII. – Exploration; Social Condition Abolition of Land Grant System; 1831
- CHAPTER IX. – Famine Prices and Progressive Incidents; 1832
- CHAPTER X. – Native Strife and Progressive Incidents; 1833
- CHAPTER XI. – Condition of Settlement; Agitation and Native Troubles; 1834-5
- CHAPTER XII. – Animation in Pastoral Pursuits; Occurrences from 1836 to 1838
- CHAPTER XIII. – Land Laws; Exploration; Australind Settlement; 1839–42
- CHAPTER XIV. – Depression; Birth of Industries; Convict Agitation; 1843 to 1848
- CHAPTER XV. – A Penal Settlement; 1849 to 1853
- CHAPTER XVI. – The Convict System; 1854 to 1860
- CHAPTER XVII. – Transportation Ceases; North-West; an Election; 1861 to 1868
- CHAPTER XVIII. – Representative Government Exploration; 1869 to 1878
- CHAPTER XIX. – Public Works; Constitutional Agitation; Gold Discoveries; 1879 to 1888
- CHAPTER XX. – Responsible Government; 1889 to 1892.
- CHAPTER XXI. – The Goldfields; 1893 to 1897

== Appendix I ==
- "The Interior Gold Region Of Western Australia" (pp 341–348), by S. Göczel, mining engineer and metallurgist discusses the current science and geographical issues relating to the location and extraction of gold deposits.

== Appendix II ==
- "The Mineral Resources" (pp 349–357), by F. C. B. Vosper deals with the major goldfield regions as well as mining machinery and mining laws.

== Biographies ==
=== A ===
- Alexander, William, M.L.C.

=== B ===
- Backhouse, Frank Herbert
- Dr. Barnett, Henry Calvert, J.P., M.R.c.s., L.R.C.P.
- Bellingham, George, J.P., M.I.F.M.E., M.E.
- Captain Bissenberger, Frank
- Briggs, Henry, J.P., M.L.C.
- Brimage, Thomas Frederick
- Broadhurst, Florance C.
- Brookman, William Gordon
- Bush, Robert Edwin, J.P., ex-M.L.C.

=== C ===
- Chewings, Dr. Charles, PH. M.E.
- Clare, William Edward
- Cohn, Isidore James Knight, J.P.
- Congdon, Daniel Keen, J.P., M.L.C.
- Connor, Francis, M.L.A.
- Conolly, John Richard Arthur, J.P., M.L.A.
- Craig, Frank, J.P.
- Crossland, Charles, J.P.
- Cumbrae-Stewart, Charles Robert
- Cutbush, Charles

=== D ===
- Davies, Edward William, ex-M.L.C.
- Davies, George Alfred, J.P.
- Davies, John
- De Baun, John
- Deeley, Charles Ernest
- Dempster, Charles Edward, J.P., M.L.A.
- Doherty, Dennis Joseph, M.L.C.
- Doolette, Dorham Longford
- Rev. Father Duff, James
- Dunn, John George, F.R.G.S.

=== E ===
- Edgar, John, J.P.
- Ewing, Norman Kirkwood, M.L.A.

=== F ===
- Fairbairn, Robert, P.M.
- Fearby, George Rowland, M.E.
- Ferguson, John Maxwell
- Fimister, John William
- Finnerty, John Michael, R.M.
- Sir Forrest, John, K.C.M.G., F.R.G.S., F.G.S.

=== G ===
- Gale, William Hepburn, J.P.
- The Most Rev. Gibney, Matthew, D.D.
- Glyde, George, J.P., ex M.L.C.
- Göczel, Stephen L., M.E.
- Goodsir, David James Cook, J.P.
- Grant, Mackenzie, J.P.
- Grave, James
- Gregory, Henry, J.P., M.L.A.
- Griffith, William, F.R.G.S., H.G.S., M.F.I.M.E.

=== H ===
- Hackett, John Winthrop, M. A., J.P., M.L.C.
- Hair, Robert Lees
- Hall, Lyall, M.L.A.
- Hardwick, Thomas Wall
- Harney, Edward Augustine St. Aubyn
- Harper, Charles, M.L.A.
- Haynes, Richard Septimus, M.L.C.
- Henning, Andrew Harriott, M.L.C.
- Hewer, George
- Hills, John Charles
- Holmes, Joseph John, M.L.A.
- Holmes, William Johnston, J.P.
- Hooley, Edward Timothy, J.P., M.L.A.
- Dr. Hope, James William,. J.P., F.R.C.P.
- Horgan, John
- Humble, George Bland
- Hurst, John, Councillor John

=== I ===
- lllingworth, Frederick, M.L.A.

=== J ===
- James, John Charles Horsey, B.A. OXON., P.M.
- James, Walter, M.L.A.

=== K ===
- Keane, Edward Vivian Harvey, J.P., ex-M.L.A.
- Dr. Kenny, Daniel, L.R.C.S., L.K.Q.C.P.I.
- Kingsmill, Walter, J.P., M.L.A.

=== L ===
- Lacey, Edmund Gilyard
- Leake, George, M.L.A.
- Lee, Alfred Frederick, Councillor (Perth)
- Hon. Sir Lee-Steere, James G., K.B.
- Lefroy, Henry Bruce, J.P., M.L.A.
- Hon. Lefroy, Anthony O'Grady, C.M.G.
- Lindsay, David, F.R.G.S., M.S.A.J.S.
- Locke, Ernest Charles Bavage, M.L.A.
- Loton, William Thorley, M.L.A.
- Dr. Lovegrove, Thomas Henry, J.F., M.R.C.S. ENG.
- Lovely, William Harvey Chapman, M.A.I.M.E., M.I.M.M.E.
- Lyon, Charles Gordon, J.P.

=== M ===
- Macdonald, Albert Watt, J.P.
- Mackay, Donald McDonald, M.L.C.
- Mackenzie, Alfred
- Mannheim, Ernest Arthur, H.E.
- Hon. Marmion, William Edward, M.L.A.
- Mason, Clayton Turner, J.P., M. INST. C.E.
- Menzie, Leslie Robert
- Mitchell, Samuel, J.P., M.L.A.
- Monger, Frederick Charles, M.L.A.
- Moore, John Fairbourne
- Moore, William Dalgety, ex-M.L.C.
- Moorhead, Frederick William
- Moran, Charles John
- Morgans, Alfred Edward
- Mosey, Frederick
- Moxon, William Ernest
- Mumme, William
- McCormack, Harold B.
- McDonald, John Ernest
- McDonald, John James
- McGillicuddy, Ernest
- McKenzie, Robert Donald
- McKernan, Hugh, M.L.C.
- McLarty, Edward, J.P., M.L.C.
- McWilliams, George Frederick, M. B.

=== N ===
- Newman, Thomas

=== O ===
- Captain Oates, William [sic], M.L.A.
- Oldham, Charles Henry, M.L.A.
- Captain Owston, William
- O'Connor, Michael, B.A.

=== P ===
- Parker, George
- Parker, Stephen Henry, Q.C., M.L.C.
- Parker, Stephen Stanley, J.P., ex-M.L.C.
- Parry, Henry Ernest, J.P.
- Parsons, Harold George
- Paterson, Charles Anthony
- Paterson, William, J.P., ex-M.L.C. and M.L.A.
- Pearce, Thomas Gilbert
- Pennefather, Richard William, B.A., L.L.B., and M.L.A.
- Colonel Phillips, George Braithwaite, J.P.
- Phillips, Samuel J., J.P., M.L.A.
- Hon. Piesse, Frederick Henry, J.P., M.L.A.
- Price, Edward Graham
- Price, Matthew

=== Q ===
- Councillor Quinlan, Timothy Francis, J.P., M.L.A.

=== R ===
- Randell, George, J.P., M.L.C.
- Reid, John, C.E.
- Hon. Richardson, Alex. Robert, M.L.A.
- Bishop Riley, Charles Owen Leaver, D.D.
- Roe, Augustus Sandford, J.P.
- Roe, James Broun, J P.

=== S ===
- Saunders, Henry John, J.P., M.L.C.
- Councillor Saw, Charles Augustus, J.P.
- Scheidel, August, PH. D.
- Schlam S. B., S. B., F.G.S.
- Shaw, James, J.P.
- Shenton, Ernest Chawner
- Sir Shenton, George, K.B., M.L.C.
- Sholl, Edward
- Sholl, Horatio William, M.L.A.
- Sholl, Richard Adolphus, J.P.
- Sholl, Robert Frederick, J.P., M.L.A.
- Short, John Tregterthen
- Simon, Alfred Leon, PH. D.
- Simpson, George Thomas, M.L.A.
- Sinclair, Walter John Lockyer
- Speed, James Montgomery
- Stow, Reginald Marshall

=== T ===
- Taylor, John Howard, M.L.C.
- Thomas, John
- Hon. Throssell, George, J.P., M.L.A.
- Dr. Tratman, Frank, J.P., M.D.
- Trigg, Henry Stirling, F.R.I.V.A.

=== V ===
- Vanzetti, Eugenio
- Hon. Venn, Harry Whittall, J.P., M.L.A.
- Vosper, F. C. B., M.L.A., M.A.I.M.E.

=== W ===
- Wallace, Frank, J.P., M.L.A.
- Dr. Waylen, Alfred Robert, M.D., M.R.C.S. ENG., L.S.A., J.P.
- Williams, Harry
- Councillor Wilson, Frank, (Perth)
- Wilson, John, J.P.
- Hon. Wittenoom, Edward Horne, J.P., M.L.C.
- Woodward, Harry Page, J.P., F.G.S., F.R.G.S., F.I. INST.

== Publication details ==
- Kimberly, Warren Bert, ed. (1897). History of West Australia: A Narrative of her Past together with Biographies of her Leading Men. Melbourne: F. W. Niven. OCLC 36942961. Wikidata Q5867187.
- Kimberly, Warren Bert, ed. (1897). History of West Australia . Melbourne: F. W. Niven – via Wikisource.
