= 1916 Coolgardie state by-election =

1916 By-election in Western Australia

- 15 August 1916
	First party	Second party
Candidate	George Lambert	Donald MacPherson
Party	Labor	Independent
Popular vote	1,164	340
Percentage	71.9	21.0
Swing	—	—

The 1916 Coolgardie state by-election was a by-election held on 15 August 1916 for the Coolgardie seat in the Western Australian Legislative Assembly. The by-election was triggered by the death of the sitting Labor member Charles McDowall on 13 July 1916.

== Background ==
Charles McDowall had represented the Coolgardie electorate since winning the seat at the 1908 state election. He was re-elected unopposed at the 1914 state election. McDowall died in West Perth on 13 July 1916 from Bright's disease creating a casual vacancy. Labor pre-selected former miner George Lambert as its candidate. He had sat previously on the Kalgoorlie Municipal Council in 1904. Two other candidates nominated: Donald MacPherson and chemist John Boileau. They were described as "Liberal Opponents" but officially contested the seats as independents.

== Results ==
George Lambert won the seat for Labor in a landslide, securing a substantial majority.

Party	Candidate	Votes	%
Labor	George Lambert	1,164	71.9
Independent	Donald MacPherson	340	21.0
Independent	John Boileau	115	7.1
Total formal votes		1,619	100.0

== Aftermath ==
Lambert was elected and went on to hold Coolgardie with comfortable majorities at subsequent elections until the seat was abolished in a redistribution ahead of the 1930 state election. After which he represented the new Electoral district of Yilgarn-Coolgardie until 30 June 1941 when he died in office, resulting in another casual vacancy.

== See also ==
- Electoral results for the district of Coolgardie
