= Electoral results for the district of Yilgarn-Coolgardie =

Western Australian district election results

This is a list of electoral results for the Electoral district of Yilgarn-Coolgardie in Western Australian state elections.

== Members for Yilgarn-Coolgardie ==
| Members | Party | Term |
|---|---|---|
| Edwin Corboy | Labor | 1930–1933 |
| George Lambert | Labor | 1933–1941 |
| Lionel Kelly | Independent Country | 1941–1943 |
| Lionel Kelly | Independent | 1943–1946 |
| Lionel Kelly | Labor | 1946–1950 |

== Election results ==
=== Elections in the 1940s ===
1947 Western Australian state election: Yilgarn-Coolgardie
| Party | Candidate | Votes | % | ±% |
|---|---|---|---|---|
| Labor | Lionel Kelly | unopposed | | |
| Labor hold | | Swing | | |

1943 Western Australian state election: Yilgarn-Coolgardie
| Party | Candidate | Votes | % | ±% |
|---|---|---|---|---|
| Independent | Lionel Kelly | 1,269 | 59.9 | +20.5 |
| Labor | Francis Bennett | 849 | 40.1 | +5.1 |
| Total formal votes | | 2,118 | 97.2 | −1.0 |
| Informal votes | | 60 | 2.8 | +1.0 |
| Turnout | | 2,178 | 81.5 | +13.6 |
| Independent hold | | Swing | +6.3 | |

1941 Yilgarn-Coolgardie state by-election
| Party | Candidate | Votes | % | ±% |
|---|---|---|---|---|
| Independent Country | Lionel Kelly | 1,015 | 39.4 | +17.7 |
| Labor | Cornelius Kenneally | 902 | 35.0 | −7.5 |
| Independent Labor | James Dinan | 660 | 25.6 | +25.6 |
| Total formal votes | | 2,577 | 98.2 | +1.7 |
| Informal votes | | 47 | 1.8 | −1.7 |
| Turnout | | 2,624 | 67.9 | −20.9 |
Two-candidate-preferred result
| Independent Country | Lionel Kelly | 1,380 | 53.6 | N/A |
| Labor | Cornelius Kenneally | 1,197 | 46.4 | 8.8 |
| Independent Country gain from Labor | | Swing | N/A | |

=== Elections in the 1930s ===
1939 Western Australian state election: Yilgarn-Coolgardie
| Party | Candidate | Votes | % | ±% |
|---|---|---|---|---|
| Labor | George Lambert | 1,422 | 42.5 | −11.5 |
| Independent Labor | Lionel Kelly | 728 | 21.8 | +21.8 |
| Country | Arthur Richards | 648 | 19.4 | +19.4 |
| Independent | Daniel O'Leary | 549 | 16.4 | +16.4 |
| Total formal votes | | 3,347 | 96.5 | −2.2 |
| Informal votes | | 123 | 3.5 | +2.2 |
| Turnout | | 3,470 | 88.5 | +30.2 |
Two-party-preferred result
| Labor | George Lambert | 1,849 | 55.2 | +1.2 |
| Country | Arthur Richards | 1,498 | 44.8 | +44.8 |
| Labor hold | | Swing | +1.2 | |

1936 Western Australian state election: Yilgarn-Coolgardie
| Party | Candidate | Votes | % | ±% |
|---|---|---|---|---|
| Labor | George Lambert | 1,199 | 54.0 | −7.9 |
| Independent Country | Max Dynes | 1,021 | 46.0 | +46.0 |
| Total formal votes | | 2,220 | 98.7 | +1.1 |
| Informal votes | | 30 | 1.3 | −1.1 |
| Turnout | | 2,250 | 58.3 | −29.4 |
| Labor hold | | Swing | −7.9 | |

1933 Western Australian state election: Yilgarn-Coolgardie
| Party | Candidate | Votes | % | ±% |
|---|---|---|---|---|
| Labor | George Lambert | 1,742 | 61.9 | +31.3 |
| Independent Country | Jim Keightly | 1,072 | 38.1 | +38.1 |
| Total formal votes | | 2,814 | 97.6 | −1.4 |
| Informal votes | | 69 | 2.4 | +1.4 |
| Turnout | | 2,883 | 87.7 | +8.3 |
| Labor hold | | Swing | N/A | |

1930 Western Australian state election: Yilgarn-Coolgardie
| Party | Candidate | Votes | % | ±% |
|---|---|---|---|---|
| Country | William Price | 848 | 38.5 | |
| Labor | Edwin Corboy | 678 | 30.8 | |
| Labor | George Lambert | 674 | 30.6 | |
| Total formal votes | | 2,200 | 99.0 | |
| Informal votes | | 22 | 1.0 | |
| Turnout | | 2,222 | 79.4 | |
Two-party-preferred result
| Labor | Edwin Corboy | 1,262 | 57.4 | |
| Country | William Price | 938 | 42.6 | |
| Labor hold | | Swing | | |
