= 1906 Coolgardie state by-election =

1906 By-election in Western Australia

- 9 July 1906
	First party	Second party
Candidate	William Trezise Eddy	Charles McDowall
Party	Ministerialist	Labor
Popular vote	1,051	951
Percentage	52.5	47.5
Swing	+16.5	+13.0

The 1906 Coolgardie state by-election was a by-election held on 9 July 1906 for the Coolgardie seat in the Western Australian Legislative Assembly. The by-election was triggered after the result of the 1905 state election was declared void by the Supreme Court due to voting irregularities.

== Background ==
At the 1905 general election, Ministerialist candidate William Trezise Eddy narrowly defeated Labor candidate Charles McDowall by 23 votes. The Supreme Court voided the result in May 1906 after it was shown that 38 votes had been improperly recorded or rejected. Eddy was not officially a member of parliament between 27 April and 9 July 1906.

== Results ==
Eddy increased his margin and was re-elected with a 100-vote majority.

Party	Candidate	Votes	%
Ministerialist	William Trezise Eddy	1,051	52.5
Labor	Charles McDowall	951	47.5
Total formal votes		2,002	100
Informal votes		12	0.6
Turnout		2,014	89.7

== Aftermath ==
After the result, Mr W. T. Eddy received messages of congratulation from various sources. The Premier Newton Moore described it as a "magnificent victory". Minister of Works Mr Price called it a "plucky win". MLCs Glowrey and Bellingham stated that Coolgardie had done its duty. The writ was returnable on 13 July 1906. Eddy planned to leave for Perth on Monday 16 July and take his seat in the Legislative Assembly the following day.

== See also ==
- Electoral results for the district of Coolgardie
