= Electoral results for the district of East Coolgardie =

Western Australian district election results

This is a list of electoral results for the Electoral district of East Coolgardie in Western Australian colonial elections.

== Members for East Coolgardie ==
Member	Party	Term
Charles Moran	Ministerial	1897–1901

== Election results ==
=== Elections in the 1890s ===
1897 Western Australian colonial election: East Coolgardie
Party	Candidate	Votes	%	±%
Ministerialist	Charles Moran	500	56.1	
Independent	James Wilkinson	309	34.7	
Labour	Robert Norman	82	9.2	
Total formal votes		891	95.1	
Informal votes		46	4.9	
Turnout		937	63.1	
Ministerialist hold		Swing		
