= Electoral district of East Coolgardie =

Former electoral district in Western Australia

East Coolgardie Western Australia—Legislative Assembly
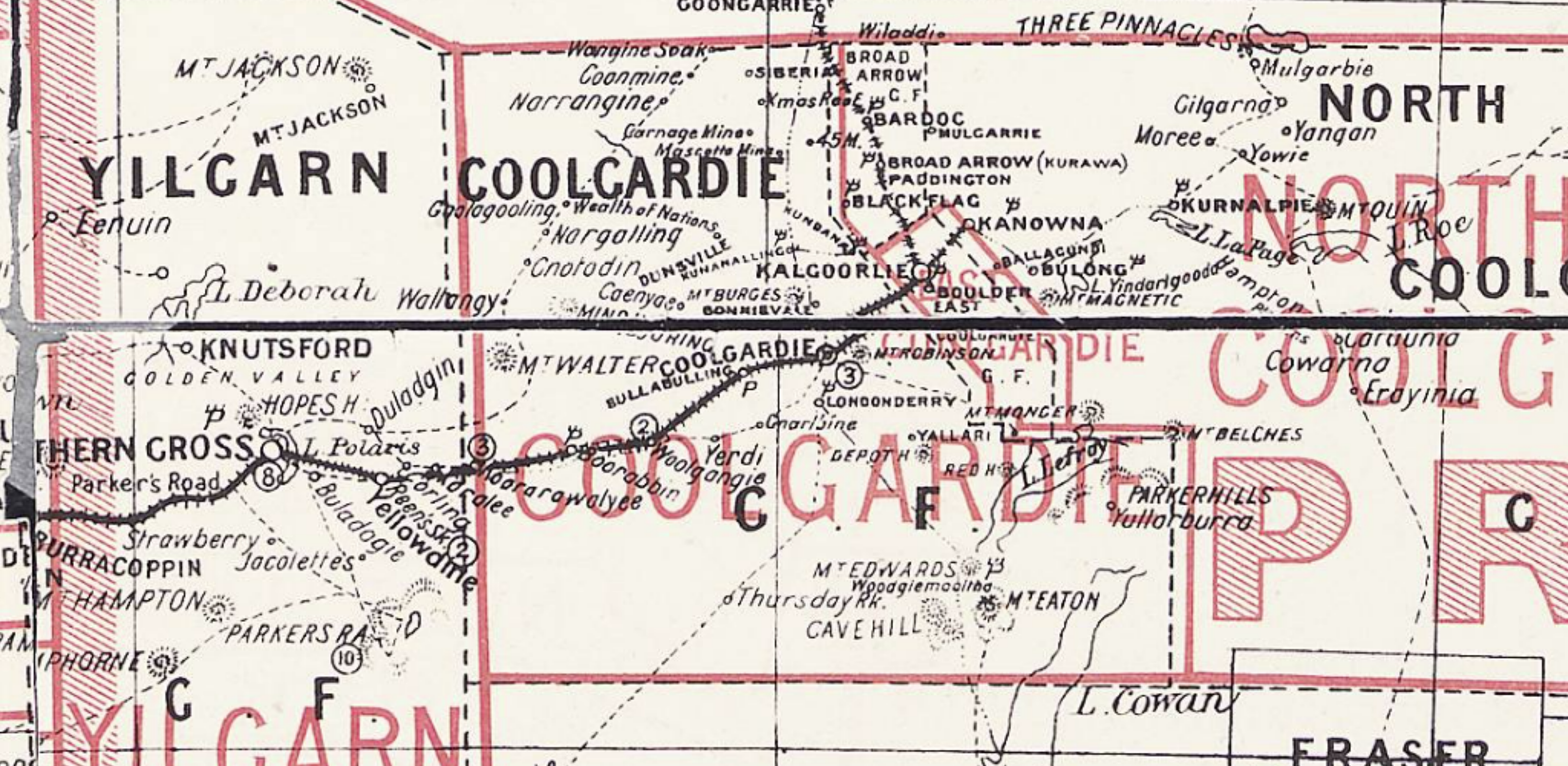
- East Coolgardie and surrounds in 1898
- State: Western Australia
- Dates current: 1897–1901
- Namesake: Coolgardie

East Coolgardie was an electoral district of the Legislative Assembly in the Australian state of Western Australia from 1897 to 1901.

In 1898, the district included Kalgoorlie, Boulder, and the lucrative East Coolgardie goldfield. It existed for one term of parliament, and was represented in that time by Charles Moran (the former member for Yilgarn). Moran later became the member for West Perth.

== Members for East Coolgardie ==
Member	Party	Term
Charles Moran	Ministerial	1897–1901
