= Electoral district of Dundas (Western Australia) =

Former state electoral district of Western Australia

Dundas Western Australia—Legislative Assembly
- State: Western Australia
- Dates current: 1897–1911
- Namesake: Dundas

Dundas was an electoral district of the Legislative Assembly in the Australian state of Western Australia from 1897 to 1911.

First created for the 1897 election, the district was located in the Goldfields region. It was abolished ahead of the 1911 election, at which point sitting member Charles Hudson of the Labor Party transferred to the seat of Yilgarn.

== Members for Dundas ==
Member	Party	Term
John Conolly	Independent	1897–1901
Albert Thomas	Independent	1901–1905
Charles Hudson	Labor	1905–1911
