= Municipality of Coolgardie =

Former local government area in Western Australia

The Municipality of Coolgardie was a local government area in Western Australia, centred on the town of Coolgardie.

It was established on 4 July 1894. It initially met in premises on Hunt Street, but these became too small in two years and a replacement council chambers was built in Bayley Street in 1896.

The council was responsible for the construction of the Coolgardie Mechanics' Institute in 1894–96; it gave Coolgardie a library "claimed as one of the best in the colony outside Perth" as well as a concert hall and reading room, but resulted in the council incurring a £900 debt.

The boundaries of the municipality were expanded on 13 September 1895, with the additional land including the Coolgardie suburb known as "Toorak".

The council opened the Coolgardie Municipal Baths on 11 January 1897, making Coolgardie the first Western Australian town with a public swimming pool. However, it proved to be a financial failure and closed in 1916.

It was divided into a system of four wards on 12 October 1898, but these were abolished in 1901 due to a decline in population; the number of councillors was also dropped from twelve to nine at the same time.

It was involved in the staging of the Coolgardie International Mining and Industrial Exhibition in 1899, with the Coolgardie Miner crediting the "liberality of the Municipal Council" as one of the factors involved in successfully getting the exhibition underway.

The council chambers were damaged by fire in 1903, and the mechanics' institute committee folded in the same year. The two buildings were moved to a new site on Bayley Street and united with a new frontage. The council operated out of them for the rest of its existence. The 1903 building survives today and was listed on the former Register of the National Estate.

The municipality ceased to exist on 20 May 1921 when it was merged into the surrounding Coolgardie Road District.

Politicians George Bellingham, William Eddy, Henry Augustus Ellis, John Hardwick and Charles McDowall served on the council, with McDowall also serving as mayor.
