= John Augustus Conolly =

John Augustus Conolly VC
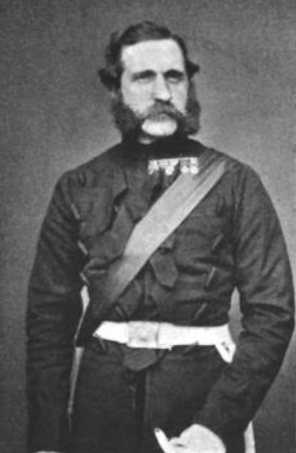
- Born: 30 May 1829; Celbridge, County Kildare, Ireland
- Died: 23 December 1888 (aged 59); Curragh, County Kildare, Ireland
- Burial place: Mount Jerome Cemetery, Dublin
- Military career
- Allegiance: United Kingdom
- Branch: British Army
- Rank: Lieutenant Colonel
- Units: 49th Regiment of Foot; Coldstream Guards
- Conflicts: Crimean War
- Awards: Victoria Cross

Lieutenant Colonel John Augustus Conolly VC (30 May 1829 – 23 December 1888), born in Celbridge, County Kildare, Ireland, was an Irish recipient of the Victoria Cross, the highest and most prestigious award for gallantry in the face of the enemy that can be awarded to British and Commonwealth forces.

== Early life and education ==
Conolly was a younger son of Edward Michael Conolly (an MP), by his wife Catherine Jane, daughter of Chambré Brabazon Ponsonby-Barker (also an MP). He was born in Ireland and educated in England at King Edward's School, Birmingham.

== Award ==
Conolly was 25 years old, and a lieutenant in the 49th Regiment of Foot, British Army during the Crimean War when the following deed took place for which he was awarded the VC.

On 26 October 1854 at Sebastopol, the Crimea, an attack by the Russians was repulsed and the enemy fell back pursued by men of the 49th Regiment, led by Lieutenant Conolly, whose gallant behaviour was most conspicuous in this action. He ultimately fell, dangerously wounded, while in personal encounter with several Russians, in defence of his post.

== Later life ==
Conolly eventually achieved the rank of lieutenant colonel. He died in Curragh, County Kildare, on 23 December 1888 and is buried in Mount Jerome Cemetery.

== Personal life ==
Conolly married Ida Charlotte, a daughter of Edwyn Burnaby, by whom he had several children. His son, John Richard Arthur Conolly, was a member of parliament in Western Australia.

== Medal ==
Conolly's Victoria Cross is on display at the Guards Museum, London.
