= William Eddy (politician) =

Australian politician

Member of the Legislative Assembly of Western Australia
- In office 27 October 1905 – 11 September 1908 (Note: Eddy was not officially a member of parliament between 27 April and 9 July 1906, the period between the voiding of the result from the 1905 election and his re-election.)
- Preceded by: Henry Augustus Ellis
- Succeeded by: Charles McDowall
- Constituency: Coolgardie

Personal details
- Born: William Trezise Eddy; 1864 Clunes, Victoria, Australia
- Died: 11 February 1926 (aged 61) Perth, Western Australia, Australia

William Trezise Eddy (1864 – 11 February 1926) was an Australian businessman and politician who was a member of the Legislative Assembly of Western Australia from 1905 to 1908, representing the seat of Coolgardie.

Eddy was born in Clunes, Victoria, to Elizabeth Jane (née Tresize) and Andrew Eddy. He moved to Coolgardie, Western Australia, in 1894, in the early days of the gold rush, and set up as a storekeeper. Eddy served on the Coolgardie Municipal Council from 1901 to 1903. He first stood for parliament at the 1901 Coolgardie by-election, a ministerial by-election caused by the appointment of Alf Morgans as premier. He also stood unsuccessfully at the 1904 state election, losing to Henry Augustus Ellis.

At the 1905 state election, Eddy was elected to Coolgardie with a 23-vote margin, standing as a Ministerialist. However, the election was declared void in May 1906, due to voting irregularities. A by-election was held in July 1906, at which Eddy increased his margin to 100 votes. His opponent at the by-election, Charles McDowall of the Labor Party, recontested the seat at the 1908 state election and was elected, defeating Eddy by 340 votes. After leaving politics, Eddy worked as an auctioneer, initially in Coolgardie and then from 1913 based in Merredin. He died in Perth in February 1926, aged 61.

== Notes ==
Parliament of Western Australia
Preceded by Henry Augustus Ellis	Member for Coolgardie; 1905–1908	Succeeded by Charles McDowall
