= Electoral district of Dundas =

Electoral district of Dundas may refer to:

- Division of Dundas, a former electorate of the Australian House of Representatives
- Electoral district of Dundas (Victoria), a former electorate of the Victorian Legislative Assembly
- Electoral district of Dundas (Western Australia), a former electorate of the Western Australian Assembly
