= Charles McDowall =

Australian businessman and politician (c.1862–1916)

Member of the Legislative Assembly of Western Australia
- In office 11 September 1908 – 13 July 1916
- Preceded by: William Eddy
- Succeeded by: George Lambert
- Constituency: Coolgardie

Personal details
- Born: c. 1862 Ballarat, Victoria, Australia
- Died: 13 July 1916 West Perth, Western Australia, Australia
- Party: Labor (after 1904)

Charles McDowall (c. 1862 – 13 July 1916) was an Australian businessman and politician who was a Labor Party member of the Legislative Assembly of Western Australia from 1908 until his death, representing the seat of Coolgardie.

== Early life ==
McDowall was born in Ballarat, Victoria, to Bridget (née Devine) and Charles McDowall. He and his parents moved to New Zealand when he was a small child, but after 18 years in New Zealand he returned to Australia in 1884, living in Melbourne. He worked as a real estate agent, and in 1891 served on the Nunawading Shire Council. McDowall came to Western Australia in 1896, settling in Coolgardie. He served on the Coolgardie Municipal Council from 1901 to 1904, and then as mayor from 1904 to 1906. He also briefly served as president of the state branch of the Australian Natives Association (ANA), with which he had been involved in Victoria.

== Politics ==
McDowall first ran for parliament at the 1901 state election, contesting the seat of Mount Burges as an Oppositionist (an opponent of the government of George Throssell). He was defeated by Fergie Reid, the endorsed Labor candidate. At the 1904 Legislative Council elections, McDowall was the endorsed Labor candidate for South Province, but was defeated by William Oats.

At the 1905 state election, McDowall defeated the sitting member in Coolgardie, Henry Ellis, for Labor preselection. Ellis subsequently ran as an independent, and their candidacies split the Labor vote, (Note: Preferential voting was not introduced in Western Australia until 1908.) allowing Ministerialist William Eddy to win the election by 23 votes. However, the election was declared void on petition in May 1906, due to voting irregularities. McDowall was the sole Labor candidate at the resulting by-election, but was again unsuccessful, finishing with 47.5 percent of the vote. He had received an endorsement from the Orange Order (a Protestant organisation) before the election, and this was believed to have caused a number of Catholics to shift their vote.

McDowall eventually entered parliament at the 1908 state election, defeating Eddy in Coolgardie with 60.1 percent of the vote. He was re-elected at the 1911 and 1914 elections, at the latter being returned unopposed. McDowall remained an MP until his death in July 1916. He died suddenly at his home in West Perth, the cause being given as Bright's disease. He had married a widow, Rebecca Chescoe (née Avery) in 1893, with whom he had four children.

== Notes ==
Parliament of Western Australia
Preceded by William Eddy	Member for Coolgardie; 1908–1916	Succeeded by George Lambert
