= Austin Horan =

Australian politician

Member of the Legislative Assembly of Western Australia
- In office 28 June 1904 – 3 October 1911
- Preceded by: William Oats
- Succeeded by: Charles Hudson
- Constituency: Yilgarn

Personal details
- Born: 2 May 1869 Richmond, Tasmania, Australia
- Died: 30 June 1925 (aged 56) Perth, Western Australia, Australia
- Party: Labor (to 1911)
- Other political affiliations: Independent (from 1911)

Austin Alvis Horan (2 May 1869 – 30 June 1925) was an Australian politician who was a member of the Legislative Assembly of Western Australia from 1904 to 1911, representing the seat of Yilgarn.

== Early life ==
Horan was born in Richmond, Tasmania, to Maria (née Melody) and William Horan. He was educated at public schools, and was eventually awarded an Associate of Arts degree, the highest qualification available in Tasmania at the time (the University of Tasmania not yet having been established). Horan moved to New South Wales in 1886, and eventually became superintendent at a coal firm. He relocated to Western Australia in 1894, during the gold rush, and became a high-level clerk with Western Australian Government Railways, based in the Eastern Goldfields region.

== Politics and later life ==
Horan entered parliament at the 1904 state election, standing for the Labor Party. He was opposed by Fergie Reid, his opponent for preselection in 1904, at the 1905 election, but was re-elected with a strong majority. Horan was re-elected for a third time in 1908, but prior to 1911 election was defeated for Labor preselection by Charles Hudson. He contested the election as an independent, but polled only 37.4 percent in a two-candidate race.

At the 1914 Legislative Council elections, Horan stood as an "independent Labor" candidate for South Province, but lost to John Kirwan. He joined the Australian Imperial Force the following year, and during the war served in England and France with the 6th Australian Tunnelling Company and the 3rd Canadian Tunnelling Company (on secondment). After the war, Horan lived in Perth and worked in various administrative positions. He died there in June 1925, aged 56, and was buried at Karrakatta Cemetery.

== See also ==
- Members of the Western Australian Legislative Assembly

Parliament of Western Australia
Preceded by William Oats	Member for Yilgarn; 1904–1911	Succeeded by Charles Hudson
