= George Lambert (Australian politician) =

Politician of Western Australia

Member of the Legislative Assembly of Western Australia
- In office 15 August 1916 – 12 April 1930
- Preceded by: Charles McDowall
- Succeeded by: None (seat abolished)
- Constituency: Coolgardie
- In office 8 April 1933 – 30 June 1941
- Preceded by: Edwin Corboy
- Succeeded by: Lionel Kelly
- Constituency: Yilgarn-Coolgardie

Personal details
- Born: 6 April 1879 Malmsbury, Victoria, Australia
- Died: 30 June 1941 (aged 62) Perth, Western Australia, Australia
- Party: Labor

George James Lambert (6 April 1879 – 30 June 1941) was an Australian politician who was a Labor Party member of the Legislative Assembly of Western Australia from 1916 to 1930 and again from 1933 until his death. He worked as a metallurgist before entering politics.

== Early life ==
Lambert was born in Malmsbury, Victoria, to Sarah Ann (née Smith) and William Richard Lambert. He trained in metallurgy at the school of mines in Kyneton, and in 1896 moved to Western Australia, where he set up as a metallurgical assayer in Boulder. Lambert eventually established a chemical supply company, and was also in partnership with Frederick Teesdale for a time in a plaster company. He served for periods on the Boulder and Kalgoorlie Municipal Councils, and was also a president of the Goldfields Football League.

During the 1920s and 30s, Lambert was a director of the West Australian Manganese Company Ltd, operator of the Horseshoe mine and railway, an unsuccessful manganese mine near Peak Hill.

== Politics and later life ==
Lambert entered parliament at the 1916 Coolgardie by-election, caused by the death of Charles McDowall. He retained Coolgardie with comfortable majorities until it was abolished in a redistribution prior to the 1930 state election. Most of the seat was incorporated into the new seat of Yilgarn-Coolgardie, along with the majority of the seat of Yilgarn. Because both Coolgardie and Yilgarn were Labor safe seats, the party decided to forgo a preselection contest for the new seat and instead endorse multiple candidates. At the election, Edwin Corboy, the member for Yilgarn, outpolled Lambert by just four votes. Lambert subsequently lodged a petition alleging voting irregularities, but the Court of Disputed Returns ruled in Corboy's favour.

After leaving parliament, Lambert worked for three years as the personal secretary of Philip Collier, the premier. He recontested Labor preselection in Yilgarn-Coolgardie prior to the 1933 state election, and defeated Corboy with a large majority. Lambert recorded an easy victory at the general election. However, his majority was narrowed to 178 votes at the 1936 election, and at the 1939 election he had to rely on preferences for the first time in his career. Lambert died in Perth in July 1941, aged 62, after a brief illness. He had married Elizabeth Everett Fleming in 1920, with whom he had two children.

== See also ==
- Members of the Western Australian Legislative Assembly

Parliament of Western Australia
| Preceded by Charles McDowall | Member for Coolgardie; 1916–1930 | Abolished |
| Preceded by Edwin Corboy | Member for Yilgarn-Coolgardie; 1933–1941 | Succeeded by Lionel Kelly |
