= Alf Morgans =

Australian politician

The Honourable Alf Morgans
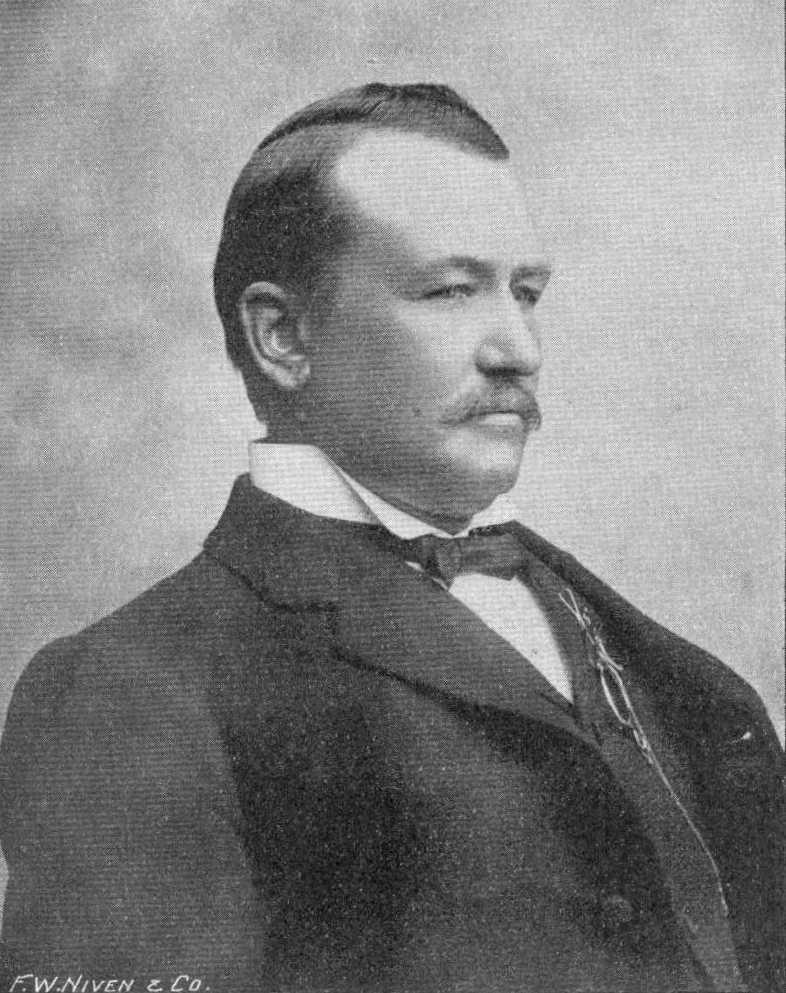

4th Premier of Western Australia
- In office 21 November – 23 December 1901
- Monarch: Edward VII
- Governor: Sir Arthur Lawley
- Preceded by: George Leake
- Succeeded by: George Leake

Member of the Legislative Assembly of Western Australia
- In office 4 May 1897 – 28 June 1904
- Preceded by: None (new creation)
- Succeeded by: Henry Augustus Ellis
- Constituency: Coolgardie

Personal details
- Born: 17 February 1850 Machen, Monmouthshire, Wales
- Died: 10 August 1933 (aged 83) South Perth, Western Australia

Alfred Edward Morgans (17 February 1850 – 10 August 1933) was the fourth Premier of Western Australia, serving for just over a month, from 21 November to 23 December 1901.

Born in Wales, Morgans trained as an engineer, and supervised mining operations in the United Kingdom, Mexico, and Central America. He arrived in Western Australia in 1896, during the gold rush, and developed the Mount Morgans Gold Mine. Morgans was elected to the Legislative Assembly of Western Australia in 1897, representing the seat of Coolgardie. He was appointed Premier in late 1901, as a compromise candidate to replace George Leake, but his government was brought down after only 32 days. Leake returned as Premier, and Morgans left parliament in 1904, at the end of his term. His career in politics lasted just over seven years, the shortest of any Premier of Western Australia, except for Hal Colebatch who served as Premier for an even shorter period.

== Early life and career ==
Alf Morgans was born at Ochr Chwith Machen Lower, Machen, Monmouthshire in Wales on 17 February 1850. He was educated at private schools and subsequently attended the Welsh School of Mines. After completing his studies, he was apprenticed to a mechanical engineering firm at Ebbw Vale.

On 19 March 1872, he married Fanny Ridler at Gloucester in England. In 1878, Morgans' employers sent him to Mexico to supervise their gold and silver mines. He worked in Central America for a period of 18 years, representing British investments in mining and railways, especially in Guatemala and Nicaragua, during which time he learned to speak Spanish fluently, and developed an interest in Aztec and Mayan archaeology and sent artefacts to British museums.

Morgans arrived at Albany, Western Australia, on RMS Himalaya from London on 18 March 1896, as a representative of Morgans' Syndicate Ltd. to inspect mining properties for London-based investors seeking sound investment opportunities. He acquired numerous properties and mining interests throughout the state, including Westralia Mount Morgans, and he was generally considered to be a leading authority on mining investment.

== Political career ==
Caricature by F. F. Booty, 1904

On 4 May 1897, Morgans was elected to the Legislative Assembly seat of Coolgardie.

Upon his election to the Western Australian Legislative Assembly for Coolgardie in May 1897, Morgans was one of the MLA's who made up the informal Goldfields Party. This was a loose grouping of MLAs from the Eastern Goldfields electorates who coordinated on regional issues such as railway extensions to mining centres, improved water supplies for the goldfields, mining law reform, and stronger support for Federation of Australia. Some of the core members of this faction were Morgans as the leader, Charles Moran, Frederick Illingworth, Frank Wallace, Henry Gregory, Frederick Vosper, John Richard Arthur Conolly and Captain Oats. The group was sometimes seen as in opposition to Premier John Forrest's Ministerialist government over the pace of federation and goldfields development priorities, although members (including Morgans) frequently voted independently as cross-benchers and did not operate as a permanent opposition bloc.

The goldfields faction differed from Sir John Forrest on key issues like Federation. So much so that within discussions on Secessionism in Western Australia if the colony were to not federate, there was a proposal for a state called Auralia. The proposed colony would have comprised the Goldfields, the western portion of the Nullarbor Plain and the port town of Esperance, with its capital in Kalgoorlie. However, despite this tension Morgans did still support Forrest. After Forrest resigned from state politics, the former supporters of Forrest continued to work together; the group became known under the moniker of ministerialists. In November 1901, the ministerialists defeated Premier George Leake on a no-confidence vote, and he was compelled to resign. However, they were initially unable to agree on a nominee for premier, and when the governor invited Frederick Henry Piesse to form a government, he could not secure enough support.

The ministerialists eventually agreed on Morgans as a compromise candidate, and he took office as premier and colonial treasurer on 21 November 1901, despite having never previously held any ministerial office.

However, in the subsequent ministerial by-election ^{1}, supporters of Leake stood against Morgans' newly appointed cabinet, and three of the six new ministers were defeated. Morgans then asked Governor Lawley for a dissolution of the Assembly, but this was refused. He resigned as premier on 23 December 1901, and Leake took office again, this time with clearly defined support. Morgans did not re-nominate at the subsequent election.

== Later career ==
Alf Morgans' life after politics consisted of a number of consular appointments in Western Australia. From 1910 to 1917, he was Austro-Hungarian Consul for Western Australia; in 1915 he was also Vice-Consul for Spain. From 1918 to 1920, he was a councillor for the Municipality of North Fremantle. In 1921 he was appointed Consular Agent at Perth and Fremantle for the United States, remaining in the position until 1930, when he resigned due to ill-health.

He died on 10 August 1933 at South Perth.

== Notes ==
1. Until 1947, newly appointed ministers were required to resign and stand for re-election.

== Sources ==
- Black, David; Bolton, Geoffrey (2001a). Biographical Register of Members of the Parliament of Western Australia. Vol. One: 1870–1930 (Revised ed.). Parliament House: Parliament of Western Australia. ISBN 0730738140.
- Reid, G. S. & Oliver, M. R. (1982). The Premiers of Western Australia 1890–1982. Nedlands, Western Australia: University of Western Australia Press. ISBN 0-85564-214-9.
- The Constitution Centre of Western Australia (2002). Governors and Premiers of Western Australia. West Perth, Western Australia: The Constitution Centre of Western Australia. ISBN 0-7307-3821-3.
- Kimberly, W.B. (compiler) (1897). History of West Australia. A Narrative of her Past. Together With Biographies of Her Leading Men. Melbourne: F.W. Niven.

Preceded by George Leake	Premier of Western Australia; 1901	Succeeded by George Leake
