= Ernest Shenton =

Ernest Shenton was one of the driving forces behind an embryonic Dixons and brought one-hour photo processing to the high street in the Eighties with his chain of Photo Shop minilabs. The Austrian-born refugee helped the Dixons founder Charles Kalms and his son Stanley, later Lord Kalms, to build the company from a handful of portrait studios into a retail chain and mail-order empire. Dixons, renamed DSG International, is currently Europe's biggest retailer of consumer electronics.
On leaving Dixons, Shenton became a trailblazer in the one-hour retail photo-processing market, building up a profitable chain of 34 shops despite cut-throat competition. He also liked to test the boundaries of architecture and design with a penchant for the ultra modern. The film director Stanley Kubrick wanted to use a log cabin built by Shenton, which was part-suspended over a lake in Stanmore, North London, and decked out in avant-garde furniture, in his masterpiece A Clockwork Orange (1971). Shenton, however, turned down Kubrick's request.

Born in 1930 in Vienna as Ernst Schneck, Shenton was the son of a material buyer and his corsetier wife. When he was 8 he moved to Britain after the Anschluss and was moved from family to family in Manchester and Gloucester during the war. He then returned to London, having secured a scholarship to attend St Marylebone Grammar School, where he excelled in sports.
The British found it difficult to spell his surname so he changed it in 1951 to the more palatable Shenton, which he found in the telephone book. In the same year, Stanley Kalms invited him to join his father's business for the weekly sum of £7 10s after meeting him at a Jewish youth club in Hampstead. Fresh out of the RAF, he proved indispensable in the office as a bright and reliable worker.

Shenton was an astute negotiator and helped the company to grapple with its growing pains by securing appropriate retail premises. He ended up running the business with Kalms for 30 years, joining the board a decade after he started. Shenton was also extremely close to its founder, Charles Kalms, who died in 1978.

In the 1960s Shenton masterminded the launch of Dixons photo-processing business, pioneering the highly profitable mass use of mail-order processing, while Kalms concentrated on the retail side. The photo trade processing division (PTP) was based in Stevenage, Hertfordshire, after acquiring processing facilities there in 1967.

Shenton attracted custom by giving away free films and offering the lure of more free films if people sent their films via his easy-to-use mail-order envelope to PTP for processing. A heavy focus on marketing, with mail-order forms placed in countless magazines and free films being given away at petrol stations, paid off nicely for Dixons. As PTP's managing director, Shenton's marketing initiatives, many still employed by photo processors today, left much of the competition scrambling to catch up.

Internally, there was also strong competition between Shenton and Kalms. The two had contrasting visions — Shenton was convinced of the potential for one-hour processing on the high street, but Kalms wanted to focus on the core retail business. Kalms, who took over as president from his father, went on to buy Currys in 1984 and PTP was sold to its management in 1989. Shenton moved quickly to open his first Photo Shop store in New Inn Hall Street, Oxford, after his departure from Dixons. He was the first to turn one-hour photo processing into an attractive commercial proposition through a network of retail outlets. Soon the competition — in the form of both mainstream and speciality retailers — were again following in his footsteps. His decision to place the processing machines in shop windows so that passers-by could see the photos coming out proved a strong attraction, although staff had to cover any pictures of nudity.

With the threat of digital technology looming, he decided to sell the business seven years later to George Oliver, the shoe retailer, in a deal worth up to £3.87 million and the move proved well timed. The Oliver Group soon sold on the business after it failed to thrive, and today photographic outlets are still struggling to be profitable in an age where consumers are more inclined to keep digital photos on PCs than get them printed.

As a boss, Shenton proved to be a highly egalitarian, hands-on leader whose enthusiasm was infectious. An approachable man, Shenton liked being on the factory or shop floor and created a culture in which employers and employees were on first name basis.

In retirement Shenton volunteered to advise entrepreneurs in Romania and Sierra Leone on how to start their own business, he served on industrial tribunals and was an adviser to the private equity group 3i, as well as helping the elderly through the Association of Jewish Refugees.

He married Denise, an orphaned Holocaust survivor, in 1960. Together with the architect Edward Samuel, they embarked on creating inventive, unconventional homes in France, Ireland and England. including the log cabin that now has a Grade II English Heritage listing.

He is survived by his wife and four children. Ernest Shenton, managing director of Dixons and founder of Photo Shop, was born on 19 December 1930. He died on 7 March 2008, aged 77
