= Albert Ernest Thomas =

Australian politician

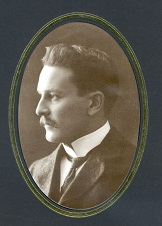

Member of the Western Australian Legislative Assembly
- In office 24 April 1901 – 13 November 1905
- Preceded by: John Conolly
- Succeeded by: Charles Hudson
- Constituency: Dundas

Personal details
- Born: 10 March 1872 Camborne, Cornwall, England
- Died: 25 May 1923 (aged 51) Camborne, Cornwall, England
- Party: Independent
- Education: Camborne School of Mines

Albert Ernest Thomas (10 March 1872 – 25 May 1923) was a Cornish-born mining engineer and independent politician who served as the Member for Dundas in the Western Australian Legislative Assembly from 1901 to 1905. A qualified mining engineer trained at the Camborne School of Mines, he worked in Cornwall, Wales, and South Africa before arriving in Western Australia during the Coolgardie gold rush. He managed several gold mines in the Coolgardie and Norseman districts before entering parliament.

== Early life ==
Thomas was born on 10 March 1872 in Camborne, Cornwall, England. He was educated at the Camborne School of Mines, graduating around 1892.

== Mining career ==
Thomas was a mining engineer in tin and copper mines in Cornwall, lead mines in Wales, and in South Africa from 1893 during the Witwatersrand Gold Rush. He arrived in Western Australia in 1896 amid the Coolgardie gold rush.He subsequently managed mines in Norseman and Coolgardie.

== Parliamentary career ==
In April 1901 Thomas was elected to the Legislative Assembly as the Independent member for the goldfields seat of Dundas. He was re-elected in 1904 but defeated by Labor candidate Charles Hudson in 1905. He contested the seat again in 1908 as a Liberal but was unsuccessful.

His maiden speech was delivered shortly after the 1901 election. Speaking as a representative of the Dundas electorate, he emphasised his complete independence (stating he would vote against any measure he believed was not in the state's best interests), support for both mining and farming interests, and practical infrastructure needs such as including the transport of Collie coal via Esperance Bay to lower costs for the goldfields.

== Later life ==
After leaving parliament Thomas returned to England around 1910. He continued working as a mining engineer and consultant, managing lead mines in Shropshire and undertaking projects in the United States, Brazil, Nigeria, Spain, Portugal, and the Federated Malay States. He was elected a Member of the Institution of Mining and Metallurgy in 1909.

== Death ==
Thomas died on 25 May 1923 in Camborne, Cornwall, aged 51.
