= Warren Burt Kimberly =

Compiler and author of historical writings

Warren Bert Kimberly was a compiler and author of several histories of Australian towns in the late 1890s. He was American, and came to Australia from Chicago in the mid-1880s. Kimberly worked with Melbourne journalist J. J. Pascoe, and the books they compiled were published by Messrs. F. W. Niven and Co.

In 1894 they published Ballarat and Vicinity which was well received, with the Ballarat Star saying 'Mr. Kimberly and Messrs, F. W. Niven and Co. must be complimented for their enterprise in presenting residents with such a high-class production'.

In 1895 they published Bendigo and Vicinity. The Bendigo Advertiser said that '" Bendigo and Vicinity" will more than compare with "Ballarat and Vicinity" Mr. Kimberly and Messrs. F. W. Niven and Co. must be complimented for their enterprise in presenting residents with such a high-class production.' The book had 170 pages and had illustrations using the "Crisp photo" process.

After that they went to Western Australia. Kimberly proposed doing a similar book to John Forrest, who agreed to purchase 100 copies of the book. In 1897 they published the History of West Australia which was also well received. The Geraldton Advertiser said that 'the compiler, who has of course had full access to all documents and records, presents a clear, readable and fairly exhaustive account of the history of Westralia'. Pascoe and Kimberly travelled from Fremantle to Geraldton and back again during their work on the book.

Kimberly said of the book: 'In compiling the history my editor has fortunately been able to glean here and there—from occasional official records, from original books of exploration, and by means of the evanescent memory of pioneers—a connected narrative of the early days.'

In 1899 Kimberly was back in the eastern states of Australia. He went from Sydney to Hobart in April 1899 and appeared to be in the process of compiling a history on Tasmania, which was published in The Mercury. It was alleged that he had passed several valueless cheques and then departed to Melbourne in July. He was arrested there and brought back to Hobart. In August he was sentenced to three months' jail on one charge and committed to trial on the other. Kimberly, with his massive, well-dressed form, entered the gaol and appeared so distinguished that three of the warders saluted him and were very surprised to find out he was a prisoner. He was so large that they could not find a prison uniform that fitted him so he had to be kept in bed until a uniform could be made for him. In November 1899 Francis Henry Furner, proprietor of the Grand Hotel, accused him of passing another valueless cheque. Kimberly stayed at the Grand Hotel with his wife, son and a Mr Giles in June 1899 for a few weeks. Several days later in November it was reported that Kimberly had funds in the bank to cover one of the so-called valueless cheques, and the bench discharged him. The Tasmanian News reported it under the headline 'Looks like persecution'.

In 1901, Pascoe published History of Adelaide and Vicinity on his own. It was well received in a review in the Register, a South Australian newspaper, although the reviewer commented that the biography section had left some important people out.
