= Robert Hair =

Scottish cricketer and soldier

Personal information
- Full name: Robert Kelso Hair
- Born: 13 April 1867; Greenock, Renfrewshire, Scotland
- Died: 3 October 1949 (aged 82); Reading, Berkshire, England
- Batting: Unknown
- Bowling: Unknown

Domestic team information
- Years: Team
- 1895/96: Europeans

Career statistics
Competition	First-class
Matches	1
Runs scored	0
Batting average	–
100s/50s	–/–
Top score	–
Balls bowled	160
Wickets	4
Bowling average	19.75
5 wickets in innings	–
10 wickets in match	–
Best bowling	4/25
Catches/stumpings	1/–
- Source: Cricinfo, 28 November 2023

Robert Kelso Hair (13 April 1867 – 3 October 1949) was a Scottish first-class cricketer and banker.

Hair was born at Greenock in April 1867. He was a banker by profession, with that endeavour taking him to British India. There, he made a single appearance in first-class cricket for the Europeans against the Parsees at Bombay in the 1895–96 Presidency Match. Though he was not required to bat in the match, he did take figures of 4 for 25 in the Parsees first innings, before going wicketless in their second. In addition to playing first-class cricket, Hair also played minor matches for Scotland in the 1880s, in addition to playing club cricket for Greenock. Hair later served in the First World War, being commissioned as a lieutenant in the Army Service Corps in October 1916. He was made an acting captain, which he relinquished in June 1918. Following the war, he was once again made an acting captain in February 1919. Hair completed his service in May 1920, being granted the full rank of captain. Hair died in England at Reading in October 1949.
