= John Richard Arthur Conolly =

Australian politician

John Richard Arthur Conolly JP
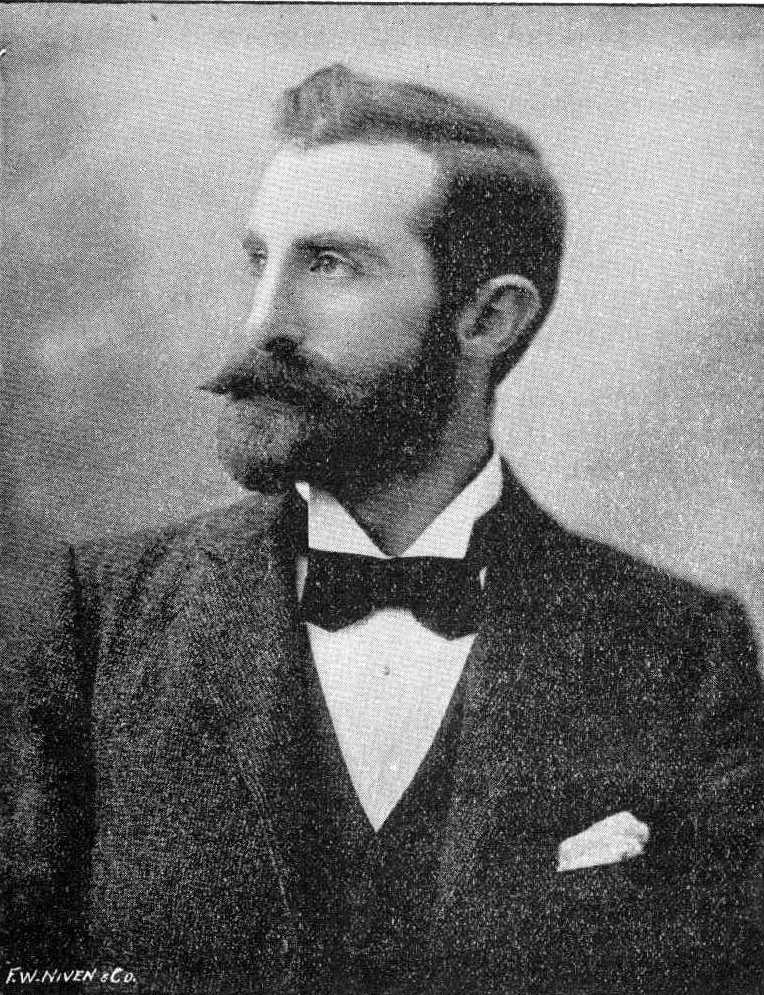
- John Richard Arthur Conolly, c. 1897
- In office 7 May 1897 – 26 April 1901
- Preceded by: New seat
- Succeeded by: Albert Ernest Thomas
- Constituency: Dundas

Personal details
- Born: 22 July 1870 County Westmeath, Ireland
- Died: 1 March 1945 (aged 74) Johannesburg, South Africa
- Party: Independent
- Occupation: Prospector, farmer, politician

John Richard Arthur Conolly JP (22 July 1870 – 1 March 1945) was a member of the Western Australian Legislative Assembly from 1897 to 1901, representing the seat of Dundas. He was born in Ireland, lived in Australia from 1884 to 1900, and then spent the rest of his life in South Africa.

Conolly was born in County Westmeath, Ireland. His father was John Augustus Conolly, a Victoria Cross recipient. He arrived in Australia at a young age, having run away from school, and initially worked as a drover, stockman, and opal miner. Conolly came to Western Australia in 1893, during the gold rushes, and worked as a prospector and gold miner in Coolgardie. He later moved on to Norseman and then to Esperance, and established farms on some of the islands of the Recherche Archipelago.

== Parliamentary career ==
At the 1897 general election, Conolly stood for the newly created seat of Dundas as an opponent of the government of John Forrest, and was elected with 40.4 percent of the vote. He was an early proponent of implementing a rabbit-proof fence attempting to draw the government's attention to the advancement of the pest from South Australia into Western Australia in his maiden speech. He was a member of the informal faction in Parliament known as the "Goldfields Party".The faction consisted of at least six to seven members of Parliament such as future Premier Alf Morgans. As a member of this bloc he campaigned within parliament for expanding rail networks to include the Dundas and Norseman fields. He and the rest of the Goldfields Party were at odds with Premier John Forrest due to their Pro-Federation stance. In December 1899, while still a member of parliament, he volunteered to serve in the Second Boer War, enlisting in the West Australian Mounted Infantry. He was joined by one other member of parliament, Frank Wallace (the member for Yalgoo). Although not in the country, Conolly remained an MP until the 1901 state election, when he was replaced by Albert Ernest Thomas.

== Boer War service and later life ==
Connoly served in the 2nd Australian Contingent during the Boer War. He rose to the rank of Sergeant. He was discharged from the military on 29 March 1901, and remained in South Africa, farming in the Transvaal (near Barberton). Conolly eventually retired to Johannesburg, where he died in March 1945, aged 74.
