= Electoral district of Yilgarn-Coolgardie =

Former state electoral district of Western Australia

Yilgarn-Coolgardie Western Australia—Legislative Assembly
- State: Western Australia
- Dates current: 1930–1950
- Namesake: Shire of Yilgarn

Yilgarn-Coolgardie was an electoral district of the Legislative Assembly in the Australian state of Western Australia from 1930 to 1950. Located in the Goldfields region, the district was an amalgamation of the former districts of Yilgarn and Coolgardie.

Created for the 1930 state election, its first member was Edwin Corboy of the Labor Party, previously the member for Yilgarn. He was succeeded at the 1933 state election by George Lambert, also of the Labor Party, who had been the last member for Coolgardie. Yilgarn-Coolgardie was abolished at the 1950 state election. Incumbent member Lionel Kelly then transferred to the new seat of Merredin-Yilgarn.

== Members for Yilgarn-Coolgardie ==
Members	Party	Term
Edwin Corboy	Labor	1930–1933
George Lambert	Labor	1933–1941
Lionel Kelly	Independent Country	1941–1943
Lionel Kelly	Independent	1943–1946
Lionel Kelly	Labor	1946–1950
