= Henry Augustus Ellis =

Australian physician and politician

Dr Henry Augustus Ellis
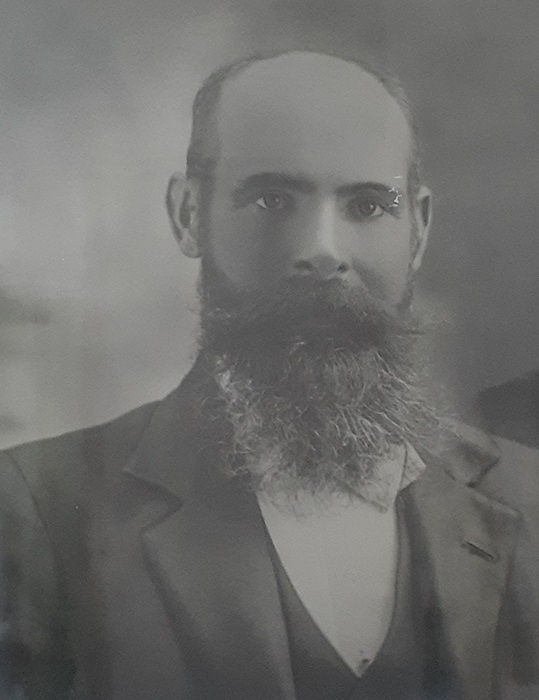

Member of the Western Australian Legislative Assembly
- In office 28 June 1904 – 27 October 1905
- Preceded by: Alf Morgans
- Succeeded by: William Eddy
- Constituency: Coolgardie

Personal details
- Born: 24 July 1861 Omagh, County Tyrone, Ireland
- Died: 3 October 1939 (aged 78) Crowborough, Sussex, England
- Party: Labor (1904–August 1905); Independent (1905)
- Education: Trinity College Dublin
- Occupation: Physician

Henry Augustus Ellis (24 July 1861 – 3 October 1939) was an Irish-born Australian physician and politician. He served as the member for Coolgardie in the Western Australian Legislative Assembly from 1904 to 1905, he was initially a member of the Labor Party before sitting as an independent. He was a leading figure in the goldfields campaign for "Separation for Federation" in 1899–1900.

== Early life ==
Ellis was born on 24 July 1861 in Omagh, County Tyrone, Ireland. He studied medicine at Trinity College Dublin, graduating M.B. (1884) and Ch.B. (1885). He arrived in New South Wales in 1885 and moved to Western Australia in 1894.

== Medical career ==
From 1891 to 1892 he was honorary surgeon at Sydney Hospital. In 1897 he was appointed government health officer and superintendent of the government sanatorium on the Coolgardie goldfields. After leaving parliament in 1905 he resumed medical practice in Coolgardie.

He later represented Western Australia at the International Congress on Medical Electrology and Radiology. During the First World War he served as tuberculosis officer at Middlesbrough Hospital, Yorkshire, and as commandant of the local Red Cross Society. From 1919 he was assistant physician at Margaret Street Hospital for Diseases of the Chest, London, before entering private practice in Harley Street as a tuberculosis specialist.

== Political career ==
Ellis was a prominent federalist on the Eastern Goldfields and served on the committee of the Eastern Goldfields Separation Movement. He unsuccessfully contested the first Australian Senate election in March 1901 and was elected to the Western Australian Legislative Assembly as the Labor member for Coolgardie at the 1904 state election.

In August 1905 he led the attack on the Labor Henry Daglish government's proposal to purchase the Midland Railway. He left the Labor Party that month after a failed pre-selection and sat as an independent. He was defeated at the election and later contested Coolgardie again as an independent in 1911. He also served on the Coolgardie Municipal Council from 1911 to 1912.

== Later life ==
Ellis married Kassie Gordon Wylie in Kalgoorlie on 4 April 1914. The couple returned to Britain afterwards. He was an amateur inventor, photographer and draughtsman.

== Publications ==
- How Shall I be Saved from Consumption (1923)
- Reaction in Relation to Disease (1924)
- An Explanation of Hydrogen Concentration (1925)

== Death ==
Ellis died on 3 October 1939 at Crowborough, Sussex, England.
