= Charles Hudson (Australian politician) =

Australian politician

Member of the Legislative Assembly of Western Australia
- In office 20 November 1905 – 3 October 1911
- Preceded by: Albert Thomas
- Succeeded by: None (seat abolished)
- Constituency: Dundas
- In office 3 October 1911 – 12 March 1921
- Preceded by: Austin Horan
- Succeeded by: Edwin Corboy
- Constituency: Yilgarn

Personal details
- Born: 19 December 1866 Kildare, Victoria, Australia
- Died: 1 May 1937 (aged 70) Subiaco, Western Australia, Australia
- Party: Labor (to 1917); National Labor (from 1917)

Charles Arthur Hudson (19 December 1866 – 1 May 1937) was an Australian lawyer and politician who was a member of the Legislative Assembly of Western Australia from 1905 to 1921. He served as a minister in the governments of Henry Lefroy and Hal Colebatch.

== Early life ==
Hudson was born in Geelong, Victoria, to Annie (née Nicholson) and Charles George Hudson. He left school at the age of 12, working as a printer's devil, and eventually began training as a lawyer. Hudson was admitted to the Victorian bar in 1892, and subsequently worked in various country towns, including Shepparton, Morwell, Victoria, Traralgon, and Terang. He moved to Western Australia in the early 1900s, and began practising at Norseman on the Eastern Goldfields.

== Politics ==
Hudson entered parliament at the 1905 state election, winning the seat of Dundas for the Labor Party. He was re-elected in 1908, but prior to the 1911 election decided to transfer to the neighbouring seat of Yilgarn. Hudson defeated the sitting member, Austin Horan, for Labor preselection, and also defeated Horan (standing as an independent) in the general election. He was re-elected in 1914, to what was considered a safe Labor seat.

After the Labor Party split of 1916, Hudson joined the National Labor Party. He was made a minister without portfolio when Henry Lefroy became premier in June 1917, and the following month replaced John Scaddan (another Labor defector) as Minister for Mines and Minister for Railways, following Scaddan's defeat at a ministerial by-election. In April 1919, when Lefroy was replaced as premier by Hal Colebatch, Hudson was retained in the ministry and became Colonial Secretary. However, he served in the position for only a month, as Colebatch was quickly replaced by James Mitchell (who did not keep him on as a minister). Hudson lost his seat to Edwin Corboy of the Labor Party at the 1921 state election.

== Later life ==
After leaving parliament, Hudson practised law at Albany for a period, and then moved to Perth. He was confined to a nursing home in Subiaco for the last years of his life, dying there in 1937, aged 70. Hudson had married Jane Ellen Wiggins in 1892, although they had no children. He was widowed in 1927.

Parliament of Western Australia
Preceded by Albert Thomas	Member for Dundas; 1905–1911	Abolished
Preceded by Austin Horan	Member for Yilgarn; 1911–1921	Succeeded by Edwin Corboy
Political offices
Preceded by John Scaddan	Minister for Mines; 1917–1919	Succeeded by Robert Robinson
Preceded by John Scaddan	Minister for Railways; 1917–1919	Succeeded by Hal Colebatch
Preceded by Hal Colebatch	Colonial Secretary; 1919	Succeeded by John Scaddan
