= George Bellingham =

Australian politician

The Honourable George Bellingham
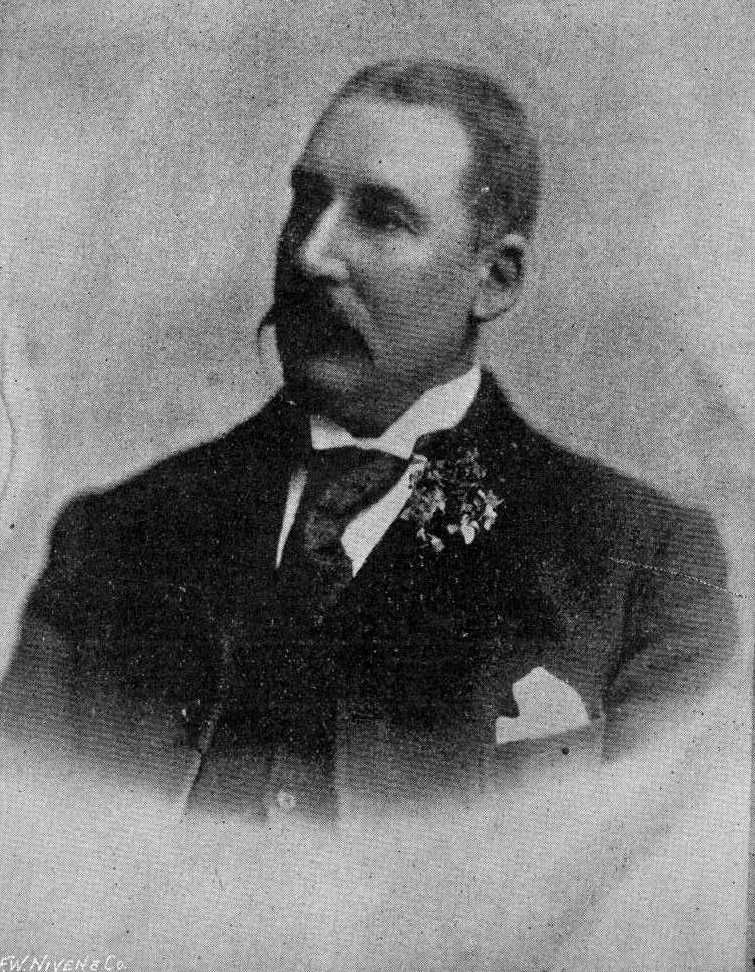

Member of the Legislative Council of Western Australia
- In office 5 September 1900 – 21 May 1908
- Preceded by: None (new seat)
- Succeeded by: John Kirwan
- Constituency: South Province

Personal details
- Born: 15 February 1862 Maldon, Victoria, Australia
- Died: 28 July 1932 (aged 70) Battersea, London, England

George Henry John Bellingham (15 February 1862 – 28 July 1932) was an Australian politician who was a member of the Legislative Council of Western Australia from 1900 to 1908, representing South Province.

Bellingham was born in Maldon, Victoria, to Caroline Elizabeth (née Addison) and Henry Bellingham. He served a five-year apprenticeship with an Adelaide-based surveying and engineering firm, and spent time working as a surveyor in Queensland before eventually returning to Victoria, where he was employed by Victorian Railways. Bellingham arrived in Western Australia in 1891, and joined the colony's Lands and Surveys Department. He started his own Coolgardie-based engineering business in 1893, and later also became a director of several mines in the wider Eastern Goldfields area. Bellingham was elected as a Municipality of Coolgardie councillor in 1895, and first stood for parliament in 1897, but placed only fifth out of six candidates in North-East Province. He was successful in his second attempt, however, winning a two-year term in South Province in 1900. Bellingham was re-elected at the 1902 Legislative Council elections, but did not recontest his seat when his term expired. He eventually moved to London, where he died in July 1932 (aged 70). His brother-in-law, Wesley Maley, was also a member of parliament.
