= Edwin Corboy =

Australian politician

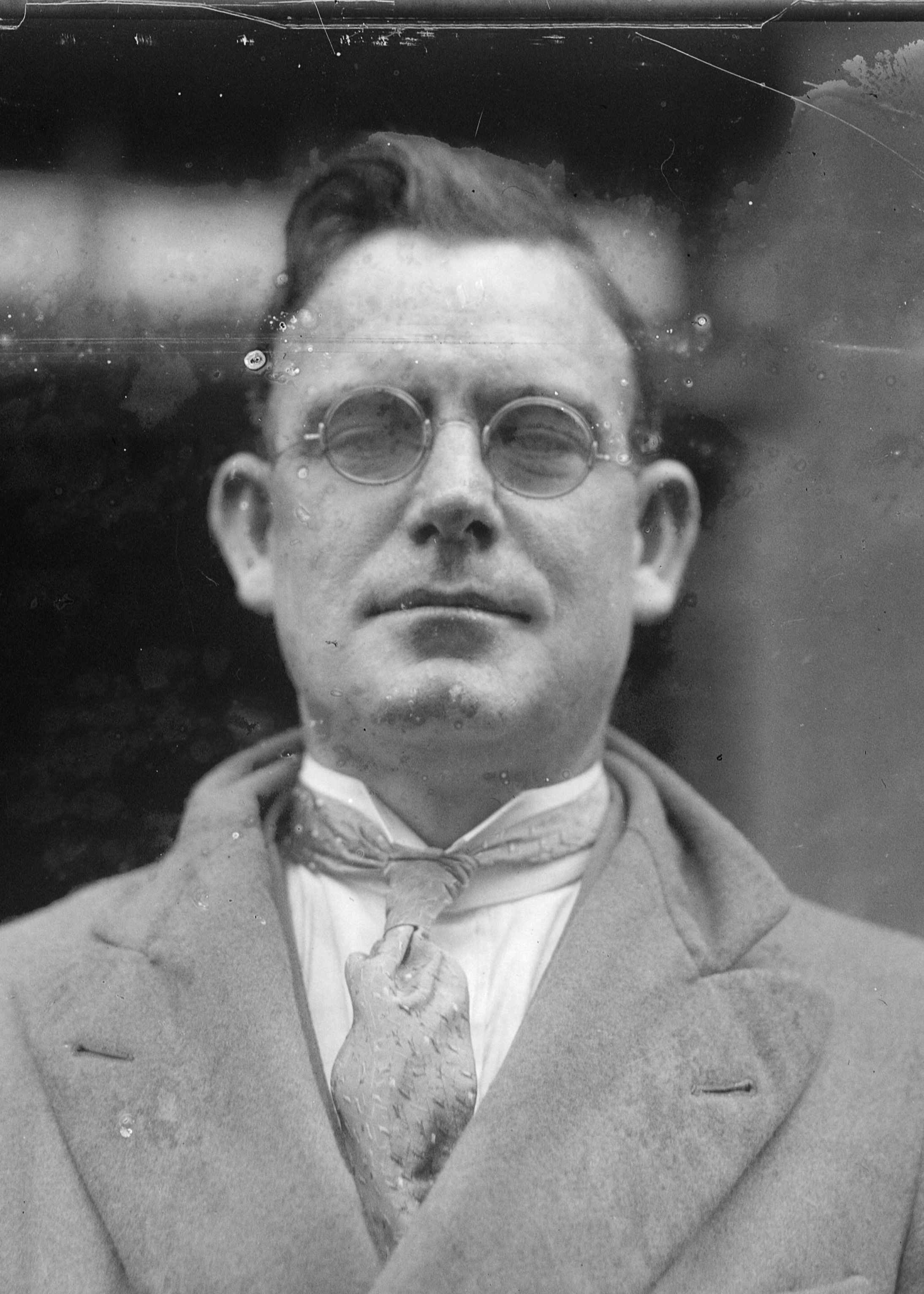
- Corboy in 1930

Member of the Australian Parliament for Swan
- In office 26 October 1918 – 13 December 1919
- Preceded by: John Forrest
- Succeeded by: John Prowse

Member of the Western Australian Parliament for Yilgarn
- In office 1921–1930
- Preceded by: Charles Hudson
- Succeeded by: District abolished

Member of Parliament for Yilgarn-Coolgardie
- In office 1930–1933
- Preceded by: New district
- Succeeded by: George Lambert

Personal details
- Born: Edwin Wilkie Corboy; 24 August 1896 Melbourne, Victoria, Australia
- Died: 6 August 1950 (aged 53)
- Party: Labor
- Spouse(s): Hannah Tobin (m. 1919; died 1942) Dora Daly (m. 1949)
- Occupation: Clerk

Edwin Wilkie "Ted" Corboy (24 August 1896 – 6 August 1950) was an Australian politician and public servant. He was a member of the Australian Labor Party (ALP) and served in the House of Representatives from 1918 to 1919, representing the Western Australian seat of Swan. Corboy was elected to federal parliament at the age of 22, setting a record for the youngest member of parliament which stood until 2010. He was defeated after a single term, but subsequently served in the Western Australian Legislative Assembly from 1921 to 1933.

== Early life ==
Corboy was born on 24 August 1896 at the Hospital for Women, Melbourne. He was the son of Isobel Amelia (née Wilson) and Michael Corboy. His father worked variously as a maltster, railway worker and ironworker.

Corboy moved to Western Australia at a young age and attended Perth Boys' School until the age of 15. He joined the state public service in January 1912 as a junior accounts clerk with the Department of Water Supply. He enlisted for military service in June 1915, after having previously been rejected. He served at Gallipoli and later in France, where he was wounded twice, first at Pozières and later at Flers, before being invalided to England because of injury to his eyes, the result of a gas attack. On his return to Western Australia in May 1917, he worked as a clerk in the records branch of the Western Australian Lands Department and was an active member of the Labour Party.

== Political career ==
=== Federal politics ===
At the age of 21, Corboy unsuccessfully contested the 1917 Subiaco by-election for a seat in the Legislative Assembly of Western Australia. He was subsequently elected to the Australian House of Representatives in the 1918 by-election for the Division of Swan. He won the by-election in somewhat unusual circumstances, winning the safe Nationalist seat for the Labor Party. The conservative vote was split because two conservative parties, the Nationalists and the Country Party, both contested the election. Corboy received the highest number of primary votes and won the "first past the post" contest. This unexpected outcome led to the introduction of preferential voting in Australia. Corboy, who was 22 when he was elected, became the youngest person ever elected to the House of Representatives and held that record until Wyatt Roy, aged 20, won the Division of Longman in the 2010 federal election.

Corboy made his maiden House of Representatives speech in November 1918, during a parliamentary debate on the Defence Bill. The Argus reported that Corboy "disagreed with the idea of allowing courts-martial to try soldiers for murder and to punish them with death." The newspaper further reported that Corboy spoke clearly and with confidence, creating a good impression. In 1919, Corboy was censured by the central executive of the Victorian branch of the Labour party for supporting the deportation of all aliens interned during World War I from Australia. The executive, in condemning Corboy, claimed his stance was "inconsistent with principles of liberty and justice". Corboy, who was active in representing the interests of repatriated and demobilised veterans, had expressed concern that jobs in Western Australia's timber industry were being filled with Austrians released from internment and returning to their old jobs, while returned soldiers were not able to obtain work.

Corboy was a state delegate to the federal executive of the Returned Sailors and Soldiers Imperial League (RSSIL), a predecessor of the Returned Services League, and in 1919 attended the RSSIL's fourth annual conference in Adelaide. In June 1919, Corboy made a speech to dock workers, following a period of industrial unrest, including riots, at the Fremantle wharf. He called for a federal election and stated that he would "a thousand times rather have been wounded in a wharf riot in Fremantle than fighting for the capitalistic rulers of the world in France". The comments were strongly criticised by the Kalgoorlie branch of the Returned Soldiers' Association, who called for his replacement as a Western Australian delegate to the federal executive of the RSSIL.

In the 1919 Australian federal election, Corboy again stood for the seat of Swan, where he won the primary vote but was defeated on preferences by the Country Party's John Prowse.

=== Western Australian state politics ===
After his defeat in 1919, Corboy remained involved in Labour politics and in 1921 was elected to the Western Australian Legislative Assembly as the member for Yilgarn. In 1921, Corboy supported Edith Cowan in voicing disagreement with a policy allowing only male guests to the Speaker's gallery. Corboy was a member of the parliamentary select committee appointed to inquire into the cashing out of soldiers' war gratuity bonds. In 1927 Corboy expressed his support for the abolition of capital punishment in Western Australia, stating that the death penalty was not a deterrent to serious crime. Capital punishment was only formally abolished in Western Australia in 1984.

In 1930, Corboy became the member for Yilgarn-Coolgardie, a new seat incorporating his former seat. A challenge to the validity of his election was mounted by a fellow Labor candidate, George Lambert, but was dismissed. However, Lambert defeated Corboy for Labor preselection prior to 1933 state election.

== After politics ==
In 1939 Corboy was again called to military service, serving until 1945, when he returned to Australia and worked as a public servant in Perth.

== Personal life and death ==
Corboy married Hannah Tobin in 1919, with whom he had one son. He was widowed in 1942 and remarried in 1949 to Dora Daly (née Dawes). The previous year he had been named as a co-respondent in a divorce petition brought by Dora's husband Edward Daly; a decree nisi was granted by the court on the grounds of adultery. He died on August 6, 1950. After his death, he was described by the Daily News as "one of the most colourful people in Australian politics".

== See also ==
- Baby of the house, an unofficial title given to the youngest member of a parliamentary house

Parliament of Australia
Preceded by John Forrest	Member for Swan; 1918–1919	Succeeded by John Prowse
Parliament of Western Australia
Preceded by Charles Hudson	Member for Yilgarn; 1921–1930	District abolished
New district	Member for Yilgarn-Coolgardie; 1930–1933	Succeeded by George Lambert
