= Electoral district of Coolgardie =

Former electoral district in Western Australia

Coolgardie Western Australia—Legislative Assembly
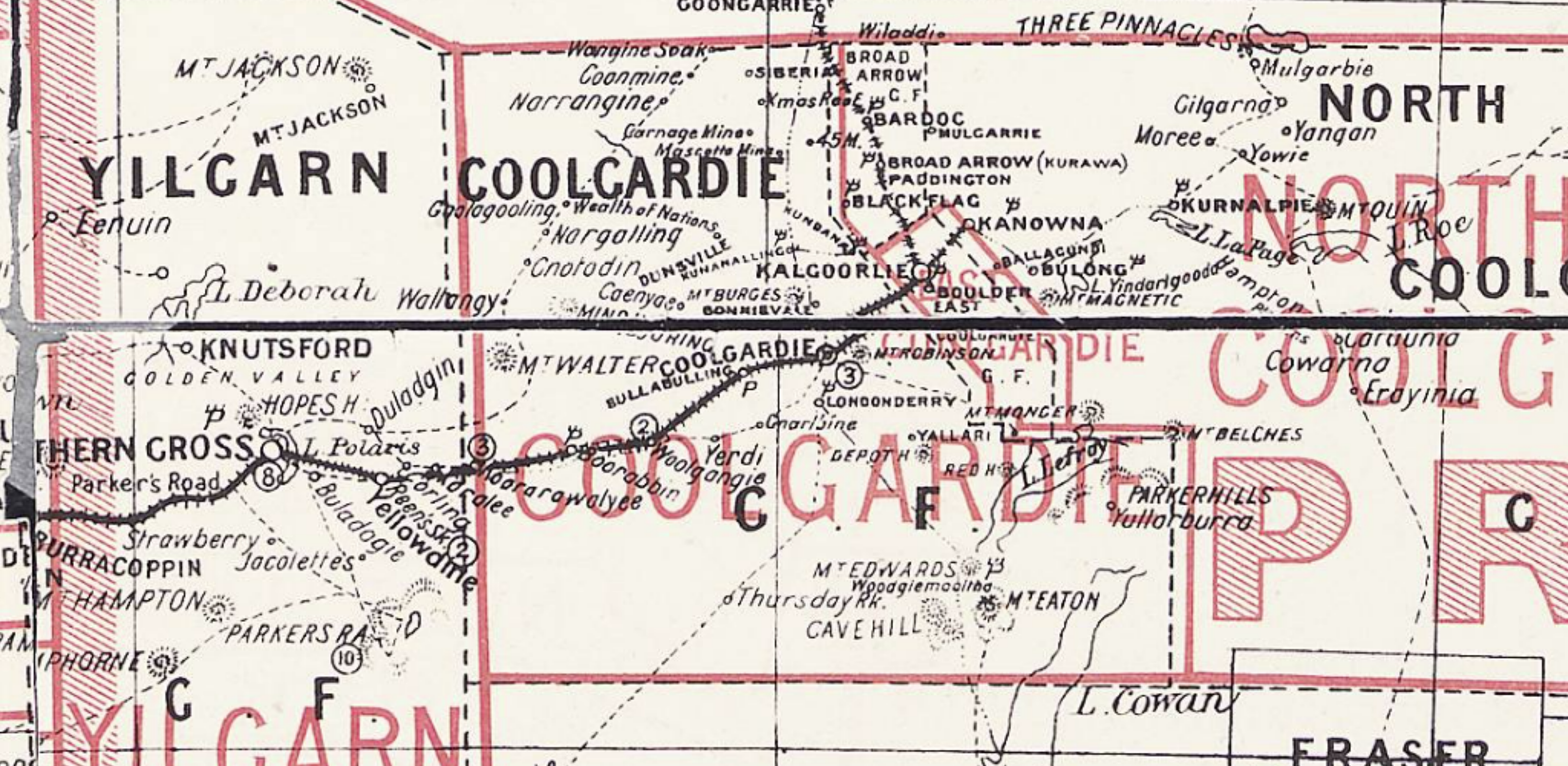
- Coolgardie and surrounds in 1898
- State: Western Australia
- Dates current: 1897–1930
- Namesake: Coolgardie

Coolgardie was an electoral district of the Legislative Assembly in the Australian state of Western Australia from 1897 to 1930.

The district was located in the Goldfields region, and was based in the town of Coolgardie. In 1898, it also included the settlements of Boorabbin, Bullabulling, Widgiemooltha, Londonderry, Siberia, Dunnsville, Bonnie Vale, and Kunanalling. Its first member was Alf Morgans who served briefly as Premier of Western Australia in late 1901. At the 1930 state election, the district was amalgamated with the neighbouring district of Yilgarn to form the new district of Yilgarn-Coolgardie.

== Members for Coolgardie ==
Members	Party	Term
Alf Morgans	Ministerial	1897–1904
Henry Augustus Ellis	Labor	1904–1905
Henry Augustus Ellis	Independent Labor	1905
William Eddy	Ministerial	1905–1908
Charles McDowall	Labor	1908–1916
George Lambert	Labor	1916–1930
