= William Oats =

Australian politician

The Honourable William Oats
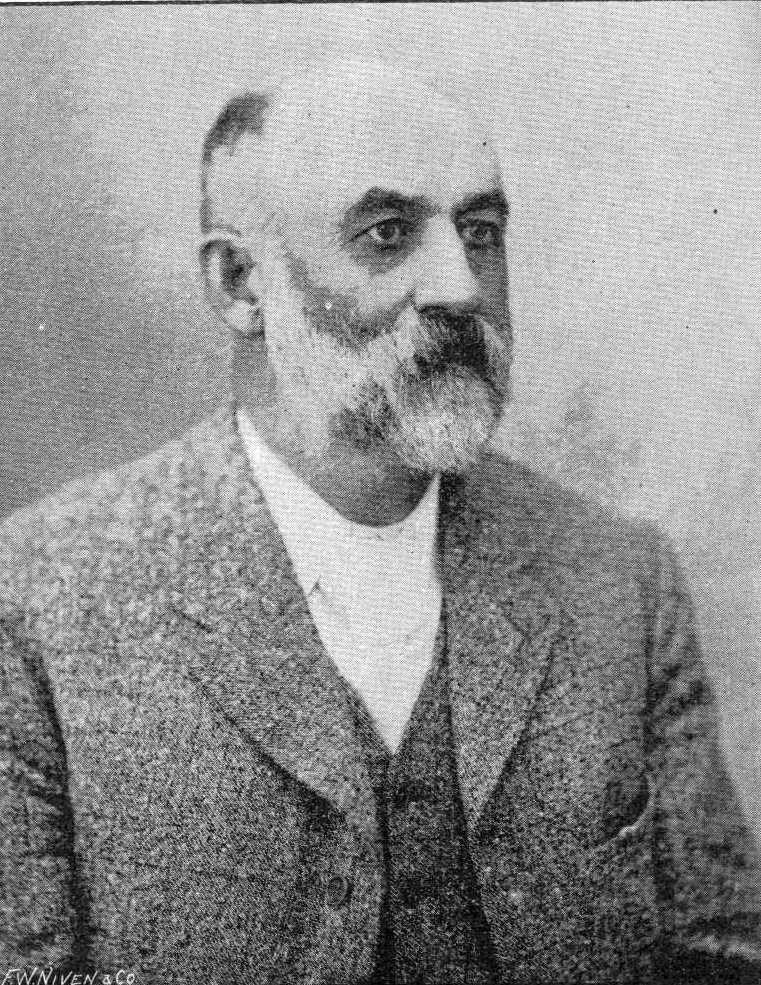

Member of the Legislative Assembly of Western Australia
- In office 4 May 1897 – 24 May 1904
- Preceded by: Charles Moran
- Succeeded by: Austin Horan
- Constituency: Yilgarn

Member of the Legislative Council of Western Australia
- In office 30 May 1904 – 21 May 1910
- Preceded by: John Glowrey
- Succeeded by: Jabez Dodd
- Constituency: South Province

Personal details
- Born: 27 October 1841 St Just in Penwith, Cornwall, England
- Died: 25 April 1911 (aged 69) Perth, Western Australia, Australia

William Oats (27 October 1841 – 25 April 1911) was an Australian mining engineer and politician who served in both houses of the Parliament of Western Australia, as a member of the Legislative Assembly from 1897 to 1904 and a member of the Legislative Council from 1904 to 1910. He was known to the general public as Captain Oats, due to his status as a mining captain (head miner).

== Early life and mining career ==
Oats was born in St Just, Penwith, Cornwall, to Diana (née Jeffery) and Richard Oats. He started working in the mines at the age of eleven, and was made a mine manager in 1869. Oats came to Australia in 1884, initially managing a mine in Bendigo, Victoria. He went to New South Wales the following year, where he was in charge of a tin mine at Eurowrie (in the Barrier Ranges). Oats came to Western Australia in 1888, having accepted the position of manager at a gold mine in Southern Cross. He was subsequently responsible for making it into one of the first profitable gold mines in Western Australia.

== Politics and later life ==
From 1895 to 1896, Oats served as mayor of the Southern Cross Municipality. He was elected to parliament at the 1897 general election, representing the seat of Yilgarn, and re-elected at the 1901 election. Oats retired from the Legislative Assembly at the 1904 election, but a few months later transferred to the Legislative Council, representing South Province. He served a single six-year term before retiring due to ill health, and died in Perth in 1911, aged 69. Oats married twice and was widowed twice, having one daughter by his first wife, Mary Trevelick, and five children by his second wife, Eliza Merritt.

== See also ==
- Mining in Western Australia

Parliament of Western Australia
Preceded by Charles Moran	Member for Yilgarn; 1897–1904	Succeeded by Austin Horan
