= Electoral district of Yilgarn =

Former state electoral district of Western Australia

Yilgarn Western Australia—Legislative Assembly
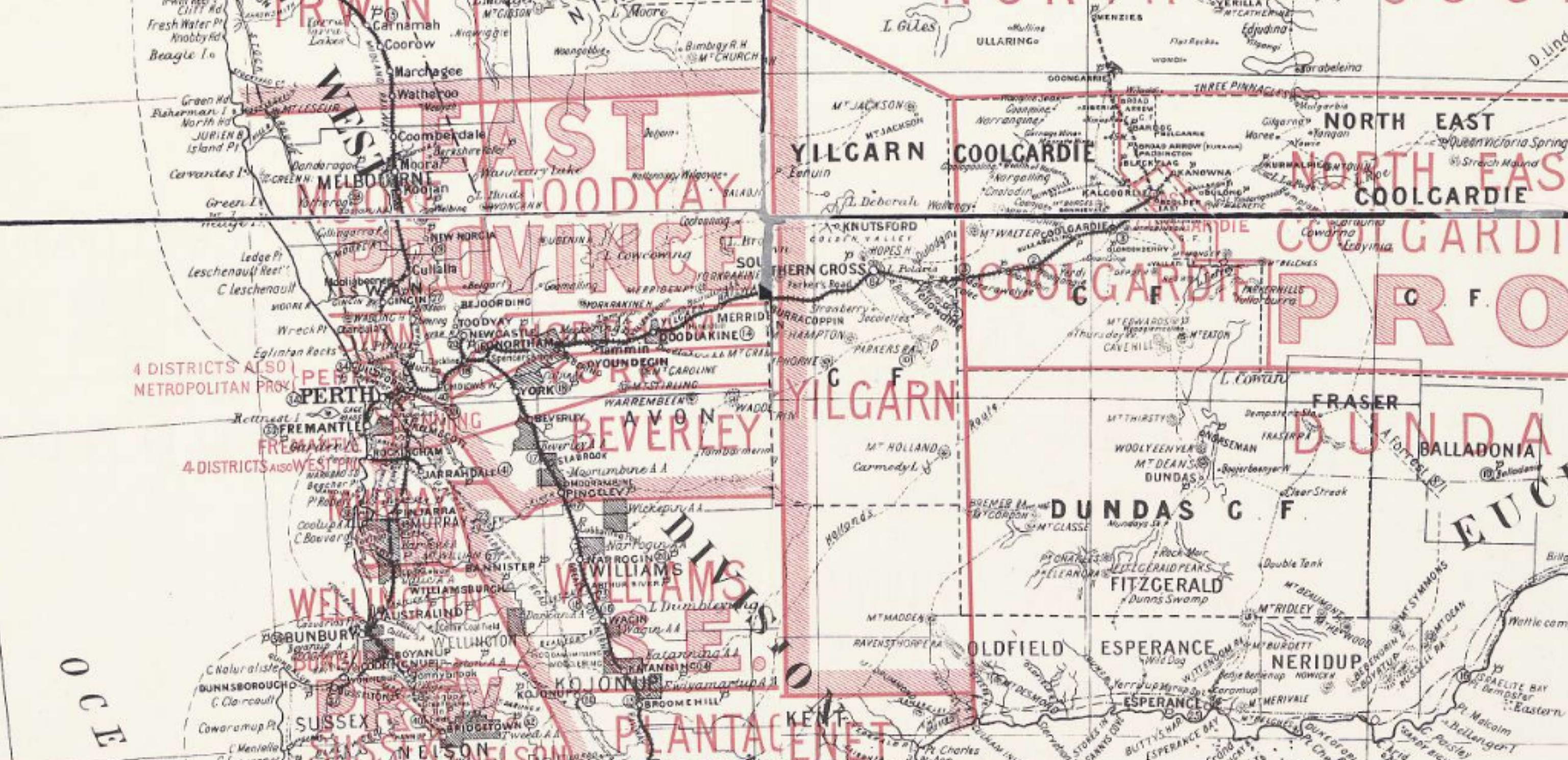
- Yilgarn and surrounds in 1898
- State: Western Australia
- Dates current: 1894–1930
- Namesake: Shire of Yilgarn

Yilgarn was an electoral district of the Legislative Assembly in the Australian state of Western Australia from 1894 to 1930.

First created for the 1894 election, the district was located in the Goldfields region. In 1898, it was centred on the town of Southern Cross and included several other settlements along the Eastern Goldfields Railway, such as Yellowdine. At the 1930 election, the district was amalgamated with the neighbouring district of Coolgardie to form the new district of Yilgarn-Coolgardie. Sitting member Edwin Corboy transferred to the new seat.

== Members for Yilgarn ==
Members	Party	Term
Charles Moran	Non-aligned	1894–1897
William Oats	Independent	1897–1904
Austin Horan	Labor	1904–1911
Austin Horan	Independent	1911
Charles Hudson	Labor	1911–1916
Charles Hudson	National Labor	1916–1921
Edwin Corboy	Labor	1921–1930
