= List of heritage places in the Shire of Murchison =

List of heritage sites in Western Australia

As of 2026, 35 places are heritage-listed in the Shire of Murchison, of which four are on the State Register of Heritage Places which is maintained by the Heritage Council of Western Australia.

== List ==
=== State Register of Heritage Places ===
The Western Australian State Register of Heritage Places, as of 2026, lists the following four state registered place within the Shire of Murchison:

Place name	Place #	Street name	Suburb or town	Co-ordinates	Built	State registered	Notes & former names	Photo
Boolardy Homestead Group	1698	Beringarra-Pindar Road	South Murchison	26.983611°S 116.546667°E	1875	29 May 2015	Boolardy Station, Boolardi	
De Grey - Mullewa Stock Route No. 9701	5113	Through Woodenooka & Tallering Peak from Mullewa			1870	7 December 2022	Also referred to as De Gray Mullewa Stock Route; A 1,500 kilometre stock route from Mullewa to just east of the De Grey River, near Port Hedland	
Stock Route Well No. 19	18198	Immediately east of the Carnarvon-Mullewa Road, 14 miles north of Byro Homestead	Murchison	25.900758°S 116.045326°E	1896		Part of the De Grey - Mullewa Stock Route No. 9701 precinct (5113)	
Stock Route Well No. 9	18199	Immediately east of the Carnarvon-Mullewa Road, 53km south of Murchison Settlement	Murchison	27.094471°S 115.905839°E	1895		Wongoolia Well; Part of the De Grey - Mullewa Stock Route No. 9701 precinct (5113)	

=== Shire of Murchison heritage-listed places ===
The following places are heritage listed in the Shire of Murchison but are not State registered:

Place name	Place #	Street #	Street name	Suburb or town	Notes & former names	Photo
Billabalong Station	1697	Off	Mullewa-Murchison Road approximately 144km North of	Mullewa		
Mount Narryer Station	1700	Off	Carnarvon-Mullewa Road	Mullewa	Mount Narryer Station Homestead Group	
Bullardoo Station	1701			Mullewa		
Meeberrie Station Homestead	1702	Off	Carnarvon-Mullewa Road	Murchison		
Murgoo Station Homestead	1703		Jingemarra-Murgoo Road	Murchison		
New Forest Station	1704		New Forrest-Yallalong Road	Murchison	New Forest Homestead	
Twin Peaks Station Homestead	1706		McNabb-Twin Peaks Road	Murchison		
Tallering Station	1707			Mullewa		
Wooleen Station Homestead	1708		Meeberrie-Wooleen Road	Murchison		
Woolgorong Station	1709			Mullewa		
Yuin Station Homestead	1710		Beringarra-Pindar Road	Murchison		
Beringarra Station	3892	Off	Beringarra-Pindar Road	Murchison River		
Mount Narryer	4481			Mullewa		
Callytharra Spring	4482		Callytharra Station	Murchison		
Memorial Citrus Grove	13165		Mulga Way	Murchison Settlement		
Byro Station	16575		West side of Carnarvon-Mullewa Road	Mullewa		
Ngatta Pool Buildings, Boolardy Station	16576		Beringarra-Pindar Road	Murchison		
Murchison Shire Office	16577		Carnarvon - Mullewa Road	Murchison		
Shire House	16578	Off	Carnarvon-Mullewa Road	Muchison	Shire Chief Executive Officer's Residence	
Murchison Museum	16579	Off	Carnarvon-Mullewa Road	Murchison		
Sporting Clubhouse	16580	Off	Carnarvon-Mullewa Road	Murchison		
Ballinyoo Bridge	16581		Carnarvon-Mullewa Road	Murchison	Ballinoo Bridge, Ballinyu Bridge, Murchison River Road Bridge	
Prohibition Mine	16682			Murchison		
Milly Milly Station	18192	Off	Beringarra - Byro Road	Murchison		
Roderick Shearing Shed Group, on Meka Station	18193		Approximately 50K North of Meka Station, off the Meka-Noondie Road	Murchison		
Cockney Bill's Corner	18194		North East corner Meeberrie-Mount Wittenoom Road and Beringarra-Pindar Road	Murchison		
Barloweerie Aerodrome	18195		Meeberrie-Mount Wittenoom Road on Pia Aboriginal Reserve	Murchison		
Road Gate	18196	Off	Carnarvon-Mullewa Road, boundary of Curbur & Mount Narryer Station	Murchison		
Stock Yards	18197		Curbur Station	Murchison	Historic Stock Yards, Moolarrie Stock Yards	
Forrest Plaque	18200		South of Beringarra-Byro Road, 1.5km west of Milly Milly in the river crossing	Milly Milly Station		
Hooley Plaque	18201		South of Beringarra-Byron Road, 1.5km west of Milly Milly in the river crossing	Milly Milly Station		
