= Bowes Station =

Pastoral lease in Western Australia

- Location within Western Australia

General information
- Type: Station
- Location: 90 kilometres (56 mi) to the south-east of Kalbarri, Western Australia
- Coordinates: 28°22′58″S 114°40′08″E

Western Australia Heritage Register
- Designated: 6 September 1996
- Reference no.: 3270

Bowes Station is a pastoral lease and sheep station located in the Mid West region of Western Australia.

It is approximately 90 kilometres (56 mi) to the south-east of Kalbarri and 84 kilometres (52 mi) to the west of Mullewa.

The station was established in 1850 by brothers William and Lockier Burges, when they applied for land in the newly discovered Champion Bay district. William Burges moved from his original property, Tipperary (near York), and by 1857 was grazing sheep on 93,000 acres. He subsequently bought rams descended from the royal flock of George II, settling them first at Bowes and later taking them to Yuin Station.

In 1859, Thomas Burges, William's nephew, took over Bowes Station. Thomas' son William Burges was born on the station in December 1865 and following his schooling returned to the property to manage Bowes. He retired in about 1912 and died in 1942.

In 1869, 15-year-old Edward Wittenoom worked as a jackaroo at Bowes, and was joined by his brother Frank in 1874. The Wittenooms went on to acquire over 2 million acres in crown leases including Boolardy, Murgoo, Nookawarra and Mileura Stations.

Following good conditions in 1869, rams cut out at an average of 18½lb. of wool each on Bowes. Feed was heavy on the ground that same year causing kangaroos to breed up in large numbers and act as a pest to the squatters.

Mr J. A. Wellington managed the station from the 1870s for Burges and remained in the area until his death in 1904. Burges and his wife left for a 15-month holiday to Europe and the United States, returning to the property in August 1908.

In 1874 the Wittenooms took 15,000 sheep from Bowes to establish Yuin Station.

A shearer, William John Pearce, went missing in 1896 after going for a walk in the bush. Mr W. Burges informed the police and then the constable, an Aboriginal tracker and several other shearers formed a search party to find him. After three days no trace of Pearce was found.

Large bushfires swept across the area in 1900 with many paddocks at Bowes being lost to the flames.

In 1902 the Land Board resumed a total of 5,540 acres (2,242 ha), split into at least 6 blocks, from the station area for other selectors. Burges applied for Block 1 but was unsuccessful and the block was given to E. Sims who had an adjoining selection.

S. L. Burges sold 7,000 sheep from Bowes in 1914 following a very dry season in the district.

== See also ==
- List of ranches and stations
