= Electoral results for the district of York =

Western Australian district election results

This is a list of electoral results for the Electoral district of York in Western Australian state elections.

== Members for York ==
Member	Party	Term
Stephen Henry Parker	Non-aligned	1890–1892
Frederick Monger	Ministerial	1892–1903
Richard Burges	Ministerial	1903–1905
Frederick Monger	Ministerial	1905–1911
Frederick Monger	Liberal	1911–1914
Harry Griffiths	Country	1914–1921
Charles Latham	Country	1921–1923
Charles Latham	Country (MCP)	1923–1924
Charles Latham	Nationalist	1924–1928
Charles Latham	Country	1928–1942
Charles Perkins	Country	1942–1950

== Election results ==
=== Elections in the 1940s ===
1947 Western Australian state election: York
Party	Candidate	Votes	%	±%
Country	Charles Perkins	1,621	67.1	+32.5
Labor	Colin Thorn	794	32.9	+5.5
Total formal votes		2,415	99.0	+0.2
Informal votes		25	1.0	−0.2
Turnout		2,440	85.0	−6.2
Country hold		Swing	+8.9	

1943 Western Australian state election: York
Party	Candidate	Votes	%	±%
Country	Charles Perkins	855	34.6	−26.9
Labor	Douglas McRae	676	27.4	+27.4
Independent	John Keast	515	20.9	−17.6
Country	Albert Noonan	422	17.1	+17.1
Total formal votes		2,468	98.8	−0.6
Informal votes		31	1.2	+0.6
Turnout		2,499	91.2	−0.8
Two-party-preferred result
Country	Charles Perkins	1,437	58.2	−3.3
Labor	Douglas McRae	1,031	41.8	+3.3
Country hold		Swing	−3.3	

1942 York state by-election
Party	Candidate	Votes	%	±%
Country	Charles Perkins	599	27.0	–34.5
Independent	John Keast	478	21.5	–17.0
Labor	Alfred Reynolds	472	21.2	+21.2
Independent Country	Albert Noonan	396	17.8	+17.8
Independent Labor	Harry Hyams	170	7.7	+7.7
Liberal (All-Parties)	Carlyle Ferguson	107	4.8	+4.8
Total formal votes		2,222	98.8	–0.6
Informal votes		28	1.2	+0.6
Turnout		2,250	80.3	–11.7
Two-candidate-preferred result
Country	Charles Perkins	1,131	50.9	N/A
Independent	John Keast	1,091	49.1	N/A
Country hold		Swing	N/A	

=== Elections in the 1930s ===
1939 Western Australian state election: York
Party	Candidate	Votes	%	±%
Country	Charles Latham	1,717	61.5	−5.8
Independent	John Keast	1,074	38.5	+5.8
Total formal votes		2,791	99.4	+0.2
Informal votes		17	0.6	−0.2
Turnout		2,808	92.0	+14.9
Country hold		Swing	−5.8	

1936 Western Australian state election: York
Party	Candidate	Votes	%	±%
Country	Charles Latham	1,485	67.3	+7.9
Independent	John Keast	720	32.7	+32.7
Total formal votes		2,205	99.2	+0.8
Informal votes		17	0.8	−0.8
Turnout		2,222	77.1	−13.5
Country hold		Swing	N/A	

1933 Western Australian state election: York
Party	Candidate	Votes	%	±%
Country	Charles Latham	1,605	59.4	−40.6
Independent Country	Donald Sutherland	555	20.5	+20.5
Independent	Charles Foreman	542	20.1	+20.1
Total formal votes		2,702	98.6	
Informal votes		38	1.4	
Turnout		2,740	90.6	
Country hold		Swing	N/A	

- Preferences were not distributed.

1930 Western Australian state election: York
Party	Candidate	Votes	%	±%
Country	Charles Latham	unopposed		
Country hold		Swing		

=== Elections in the 1920s ===
1927 Western Australian state election: York
Party	Candidate	Votes	%	±%
Nationalist	Charles Latham	1,736	55.1	−5.6
Labor	Walter Butler	827	26.3	+26.3
Country	Peter Ledsham	586	18.6	−20.7
Total formal votes		3,149	98.1	−1.3
Informal votes		62	1.9	+1.3
Turnout		3,211	72.7	+8.6
Nationalist hold		Swing	N/A	

- Preferences were not distributed.

1924 Western Australian state election: York
Party	Candidate	Votes	%	±%
Country	Charles Latham	1,407	60.7	+6.5
Executive Country	William Burges	910	39.3	−6.5
Total formal votes		2,317	99.4	−0.1
Informal votes		15	0.6	+0.1
Turnout		2,332	64.1	+7.0
Country hold		Swing	+6.5	

1921 Western Australian state election: York
Party	Candidate	Votes	%	±%
Country	Charles Latham	859	54.2	−1.8
Country	William Burges	727	45.8	+45.8
Total formal votes		1,586	99.5	+0.1
Informal votes		8	0.5	−0.1
Turnout		1,594	57.1	+3.4
Country hold		Swing	N/A	

=== Elections in the 1910s ===
1917 Western Australian state election: York
Party	Candidate	Votes	%	±%
National Country	Harry Griffiths	852	56.1	–1.5
National Country	Frederick Monger	668	43.9	+1.5
Total formal votes		1,520	99.4	–0.2
Informal votes		9	0.6	+0.2
Turnout		1,529	53.7	+3.4
National Country hold		Swing	–1.5	

1914 Western Australian state election: York
Party	Candidate	Votes	%	±%
Country	Harry Griffiths	1,116	57.5	+57.5
Liberal	Frederick Monger	826	42.5	−4.0
Total formal votes		1,942	99.6	+1.4
Informal votes		7	0.4	−1.4
Turnout		1,949	50.4	−14.1
Country gain from Liberal		Swing	N/A	

1911 Western Australian state election: York
Party	Candidate	Votes	%	±%
Ministerialist	Frederick Monger	763	46.5	
Labor	Henry Dhu	395	24.1	
Ministerialist	Charles Baxter	341	20.8	
Ministerialist	Edward Neville	141	8.6	
Total formal votes		1,640	98.2	
Informal votes		30	1.8	
Turnout		1,670	64.5	
Two-party-preferred result
Ministerialist	Frederick Monger	1,104	67.3	
Labor	Henry Dhu	536	32.7	
Ministerialist hold		Swing		

=== Elections in the 1900s ===
1908 Western Australian state election: York
Party	Candidate	Votes	%	±%
Ministerialist	Frederick Monger	633	51.5	−5.9
Ministerialist	Edward Neville	418	34.0	+34.0
Ministerialist	John Taylor	179	14.5	+14.5
Total formal votes		1,230	98.6	−1.0
Informal votes		18	1.4	+1.0
Total formal votes		1,248	65.7	+15.3
Ministerialist hold		Swing	N/A	

1905 Western Australian state election: York
Party	Candidate	Votes	%	±%
Ministerialist	Frederick Monger	315	57.4	–42.6
Ministerialist	Hugh Roche	234	42.6	+42.6
Total formal votes		549	99.6	n/a
Informal votes		2	0.4	n/a
Turnout		551	50.4	n/a
Ministerialist hold		Swing	N/A	

1904 Western Australian state election: York
Party	Candidate	Votes	%	±%
Ministerialist	Richard Burges	unopposed		
Ministerialist hold		Swing		

1903 York state by-election
Party	Candidate	Votes	%	±%
Ministerialist	Richard Burges	346	59.9	N/A
Opposition	Hugh Roche	127	22.0	+22.0
Opposition	Percy Wardell-Johnson	105	18.2	+18.2
Total formal votes		578	100	
Informal votes		0	0	
Turnout		578	52.4	
Ministerialist hold		Swing	N/A	

1901 Western Australian state election: York
Party	Candidate	Votes	%	±%
Ministerialist	Frederick Monger	unopposed		
Ministerialist hold		Swing		

=== Elections in the 1890s ===
1899 York colonial by-election
Party	Candidate	Votes	%	±%
Ministerialist	Frederick Monger	unopposed		
Ministerialist hold		Swing		

1897 Western Australian colonial election: York
Party	Candidate	Votes	%	±%
Ministerialist	Frederick Monger	unopposed		
Ministerialist hold		Swing		

1894 Western Australian colonial election: York
Party	Candidate	Votes	%	±%
None	Frederick Monger	unopposed		

1892 York colonial by-election
Party	Candidate	Votes	%	±%
None	Frederick Monger	unopposed		

1890 Western Australian colonial election: York
Party	Candidate	Votes	%	±%
None	Stephen Parker	196	75.4	n/a
None	Joseph Pyke	64	24.6	n/a
