= John Davis (Australian politician) =

Australian politician

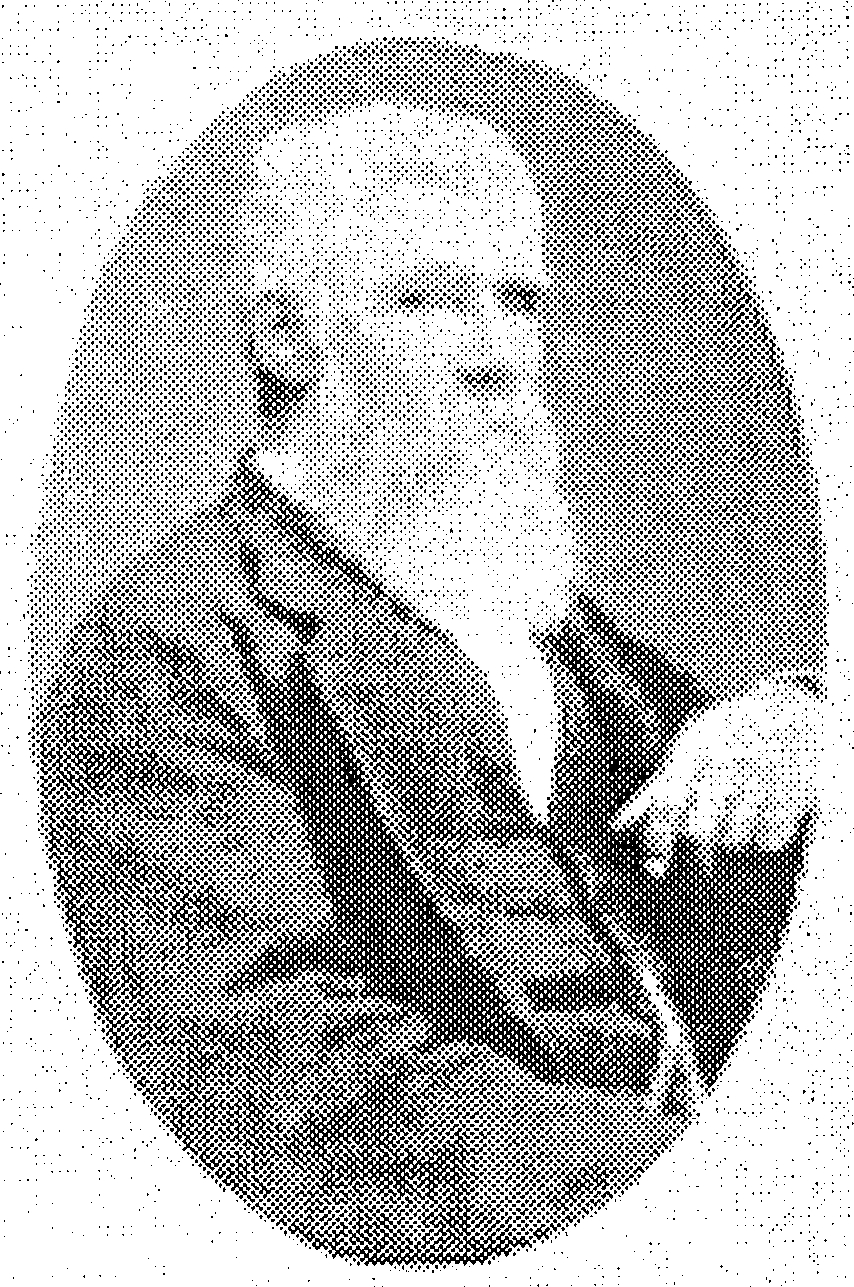
- 19th century photograph of John Davis

Western Australian Legislative Council
- In office 12 March 1884 – 27 October 1884
- Constituency: Geraldton, Western Australia

Personal details
- Born: John Sydney Davis; 1817 Galway, Ireland
- Died: 30 September 1893 (aged 75–76) Tibradden, Rathfarnham, Ireland
- Spouse: Sarah Heal
- Occupation: Pastoralist

John Sydney Davis (1817 – 30 September 1893) was an early pastoralist and MLC in colonial Western Australia.

== Career ==
=== Early life ===
Born in Galway, Ireland in 1817, nothing is known of his life until he arrived in Western Australia on board the Trusty in about 1842. Initially he lived in Australind, then moved to Hotham River to manage William Burges' station there. Later he was at York in partnership with Robert de Burgh.

=== Pastoralism ===
In 1850, Davis joined a group of pastoralists including Major Logue, William and Lockier Burges, and Thomas and Kenneth Brown, in overlanding stock from York to Greenough. From 1852 he was partner in a lease of Glengarry, and the following year he settled at Tibradden Station.

=== Western Australian Legislative Council ===
On 12 March 1884, John Davis was elected to the Western Australian Legislative Council seat of Geraldton in a by-election. He held the seat until 27 October 1884. He died at Tibradden on 30 September 1893. In 1858 he became a Justice of the Peace.

== Personal life ==
In 1854 he married Sarah Heal at Fremantle.
