= Yuin Station =

Pastoral lease in Western Australia

Coordinates: 27°58′52″S 116°02′09″E

Location in Western Australia

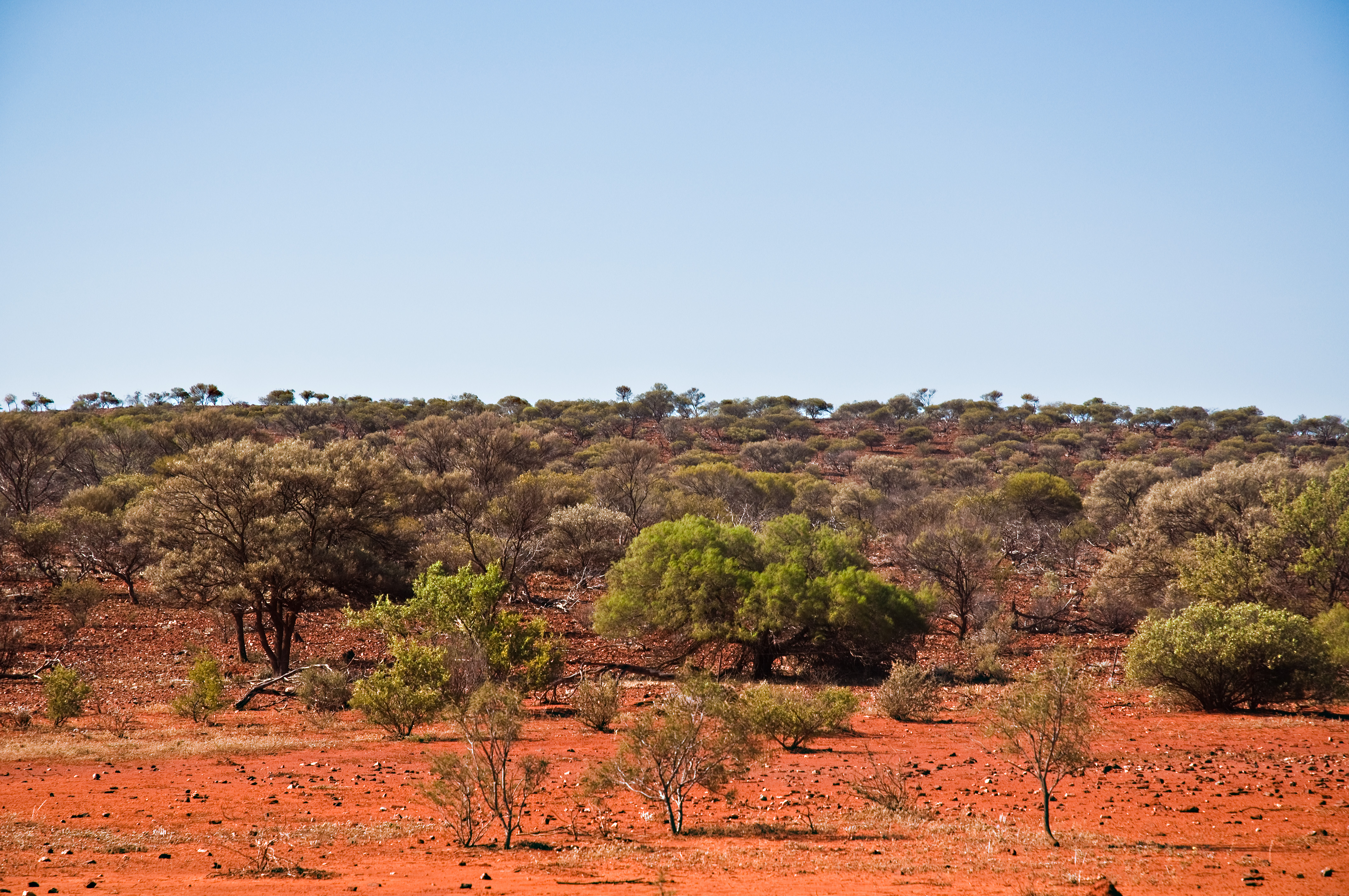
Bushland at Yuin Station

Yuin Station is a pastoral lease and sheep station located in the Mid West region of Western Australia.

Situated approximately 75 kilometres (47 mi) to the north-west of Yalgoo and 81 kilometres (50 mi) northeast of Mullewa, the property occupies an area of 189,807 hectares (469,023 acres) and has a maximum carrying capacity of 15,370 sheep.

The station was established in 1870 by Thomas Burges and was one of the first settlements in the area.

In 1874 the Wittenooms moved 15,000 sheep from Bowes Station to Yuin. An outbreak of influenza wreaked havoc among the station employees in 1883. Sheep washing had just commenced at the station and the 25 crew members, all of whom were Aboriginal, were struck down, with several dying. Struck by drought between 1884 and 1886, the station had very little feed on the ground available for stock.

In 1888, following two days of heavy rain, the Greenough River flooded, inundating most of the station's buildings with the exception of the shearing shed and the store, which was surrounded by a dirt embankment. The men's quarters, the kitchen and one end of the overseer's house were washed away along with fencing and troughing. No stock losses were reported.

By 1906 the station was owned by William Burges but managed by Mr. F. Turnbull and was running 15,000 to 16,000 sheep. In 1912 the station expected to shear a flock of 15,000 sheep using all 10 stands in the shearing shed.

Burges sold the station in 1928 to Cecil J. Levien for £100,000. The station occupied an area of 408,000 acres (165,112 ha) and was running a flock of 30,000 sheep. It was also carrying 70 cattle and 20 horses and had a good homestead. By this stage the station had 45 miles (72 km) of fencing and 46 wells equipped with windmills.

William Fremlin was the manager of the station at some point. He later ran all of the Atkins brothers' holdings, including Murgoo, Mount Narryer and Tibradden Station.

Tragedy struck the station in 1949 when a 38-year-old Aboriginal employee, Don Wheelock, was thrown from his horse and died as a result of his injuries.

Douglas Charles Foulkes Taylor bought into the station in 1928 after he left the goldfields at Leonora where he had managed Glenorn Station. When Foulkes Taylor died in 1953 he left an estate valued for probate at £65,702.

Ross and Emma Foulkes Taylor owned Yuin in 2006 when the property was inundated with 128 millimetres (5 in) of rain in less than 24 hours after Cyclone Clare crossed the Western Australian coastline. The homestead was flooded and much of the surrounding area submerged.

== See also ==
- List of ranches and stations
