= Acacia fuscaneura =

Sooty wattle

Scientific classification
- Kingdom: Plantae
- Clade: Tracheophytes
- Clade: Angiosperms
- Clade: Eudicots
- Clade: Rosids
- Order: Fabales
- Family: Fabaceae
- Subfamily: Caesalpinioideae
- Clade: Mimosoid clade
- Genus: Acacia
- Species: A. fuscaneura

Binomial name
- Acacia fuscaneura Maslin & J.E.Reid
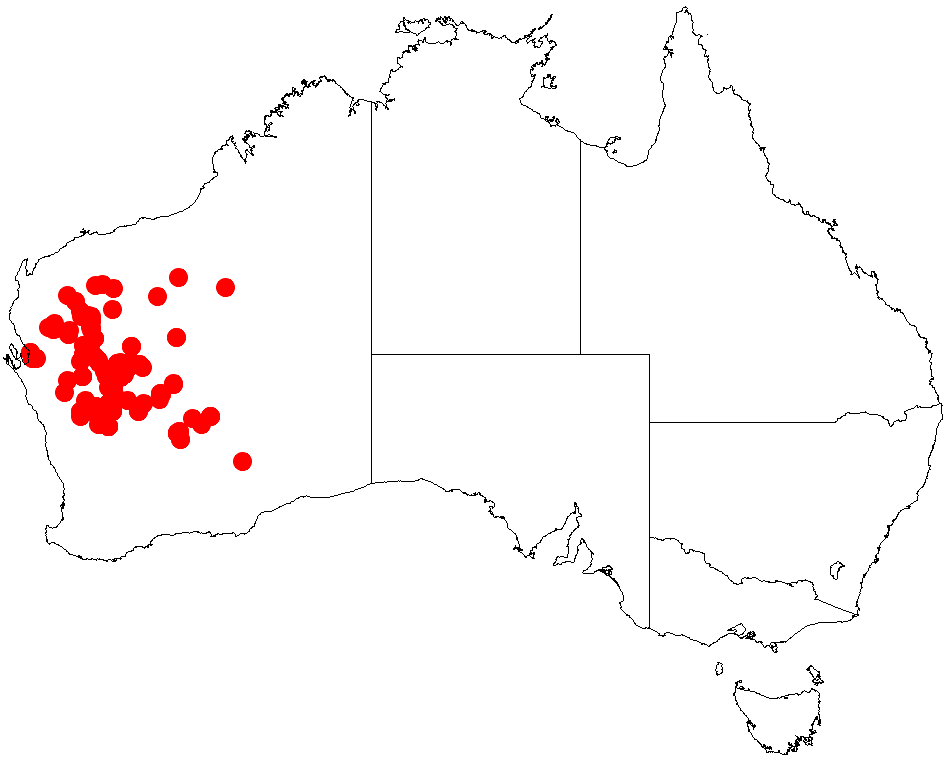
- Occurrence data from AVH

Synonyms
- Acacia aneura var. fuliginea Pedley nom. inval.; Acacia aneura var. fuliginea Pedley; Acacia sp. Mulga dark shoots (B.R.Maslin & J.E.Reid BRM 9754); Racosperma aneurum var. fuligineum (Pedley) Pedley

Species of plant

Acacia fuscaneura, commonly known as sooty wattle, is a species of flowering plant in the family Fabaceae and is endemic to the inland of Western Australia. It is an inverted cone-shaped shrub with charcoal grey to blackish bark, densely hairy branchlets, narrowly linear phyllodes, spikes of golden yellow flowers and oblong to narrowly oblong, thinly leathery pods, slightly to moderately constricted between the seeds.

== Description ==
Acacia fuscaneura is an inverted cone-shaped tree that typically grows to a height of 3–8 m (9.8–26.2 ft) with charcoal grey to blackish bark and branchlets with a dense layer of dark-coloured glandular hairs, imparting a fine, granular appearance to the young phyllodes and branchlets. The phyllodes are more or less straight to slightly curved, s-shaped or wavy, not rigid 50–100 mm (2.0–3.9 in) long and 1–3 mm (0.039–0.118 in) wide with a gland up to 2 mm (0.079 in) above the pulvinus. The flowers are borne in spikes on peduncles mostly 5–12 mm (0.20–0.47 in) long. Flowering has been observed from late March to early May and in September, with sporadic flowering in other months. The pods are oblong to narrowly oblong, mostly 20–50 mm (0.79–1.97 in) long, 8–13 mm (0.31–0.51 in) wide, thinly leathery and shallowly to moderately constricted between the seeds. The seeds are 4–7 mm (0.16–0.28 in) long and 4–6 mm (0.16–0.24 in) wide with a small, more or less white aril.

== Taxonomy ==
Acacia fuscaneura was first formally described in 2012 by the botanists Bruce Maslin and Jordan E. Reid in the journal Nuytsia from specimens they collected on Beringarra Station 8 km (5.0 mi) south of the homestead in 2008. The specific epithet (fuscaneura) is derived from the Latin word meaning 'brown' or 'dark' with "aneura", referring to Acacia aneura.

== Distribution and habitat ==
Sooty wattle ranges from the Pilbara region, south to Paynes Find and east to near Wiluna and Laverton with an outlier near Shark Bay. It grows in sand, loam or clay on stony plains in mulga or mixed Acacia shrubland in the Carnarvon, Gascoyne, Great Victoria Desert, Murchison, Pilbara and Yalgoo bioregions of inland Western Australia.

== Conservation status ==
Acacia fuscaneura is listed as "not threatened" by the Government of Western Australia Department of Biodiversity, Conservation and Attractions.

== See also ==
- List of Acacia species
