= Thomas Burges =

Australian politician

The Honourable Thomas Burges

Member of the Legislative Council of Western Australia
- In office 31 December 1874 – 31 January 1878
- Preceded by: None (new creation)
- Succeeded by: Charles Harper
- Constituency: North
- In office 11 July 1885 – 9 June 1887
- Preceded by: Stephen Stanley Parker
- Succeeded by: Daniel Keen Congdon
- Constituency: None (nominated by governor)
- In office 24 December 1890 – 7 August 1893
- Preceded by: None (new creation)
- Succeeded by: Harry Anstey
- Constituency: None (nominated by governor)

Personal details
- Born: July 1830 York, Western Australia, Australia
- Died: 7 August 1893 (aged 63) Perth, Western Australia, Australia

Thomas Burges (July 1830 – 7 August 1893) was an Australian pastoralist and politician who was a member of the Legislative Council of Western Australia on three occasions – from 1874 to 1878, from 1885 to 1887, and from 1890 until his death.

Burges was born in York, Western Australia, to Judith (née Kearnan) and Samuel Evans Burges. His younger half-brother, Richard Goldsmith Burges, was also a member of parliament, as were two of his uncles, William and Lockier Burges. In 1859, Burges acquired Bowes Station, a pastoral lease in the Mid-West that had been established by his uncles. In 1870, he developed Yuin Station, subsequently helping to open a stock route north to the Gascoyne. Burges served on the Northampton Road Board from 1871 to 1877, including as chairman for a period.

In 1874, Burges was elected to the Legislative Council, representing the newly created Northern District. He served until January 1878, when he resigned in order to take a trip to Europe. Burges returned to parliament in July 1885, when he was appointed to the Legislative Council by the governor, Sir Frederick Broome. He resigned in June 1887, but was re-appointed in December 1890, following the council's reconstitution as an upper house (rather than a unicameral chamber). Burges died suddenly in August 1893 (aged 63), from influenza. He had married Augusta Wittenoom (a daughter of John Burdett Wittenoom) in 1860, but they had no children.
