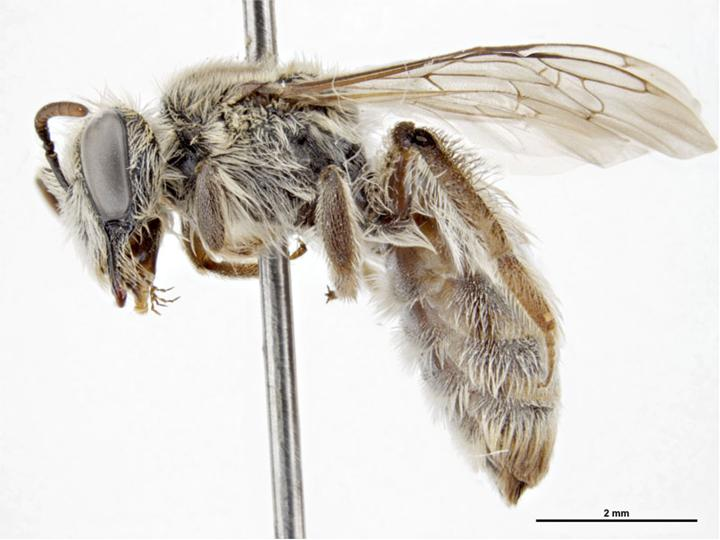
- Female

Scientific classification
- Kingdom: Animalia
- Phylum: Arthropoda
- Clade: Pancrustacea
- Class: Insecta
- Order: Hymenoptera
- Family: Colletidae
- Genus: Leioproctus
- Species: L. rudissimus

Binomial name
- Leioproctus rudissimus (Cockerell, 1929)

Synonyms
- Paracolletes rudissimus Cockerell, 1929

= Leioproctus rudissimus =

Species of bee

Leioproctus rudissimus, or Leioproctus (Odontocolletes) rudissimus, is a species of bee in the family Colletidae and subfamily Colletinae. It is endemic to Australia. It was described by British-American entomologist Theodore Dru Alison Cockerell in 1929.

== Description ==
Male body length is about 7.3 mm. Colouration is mainly black; the hair white to pale brown.

== Distribution and habitat ==
The species occurs in Western Australia. The type locality is Wyalkatchem in the Wheatbelt. It has also been recorded from Yuin Station in the Mid West region.

== Behaviour ==
The adults are flying mellivores.
