= Acacia aulacophylla =

Scientific classification
- Kingdom: Plantae
- Clade: Tracheophytes
- Clade: Angiosperms
- Clade: Eudicots
- Clade: Rosids
- Order: Fabales
- Family: Fabaceae
- Subfamily: Caesalpinioideae
- Clade: Mimosoid clade
- Genus: Acacia
- Species: A. aulacophylla

Binomial name
- Acacia aulacophylla R.S.Cowan & Maslin
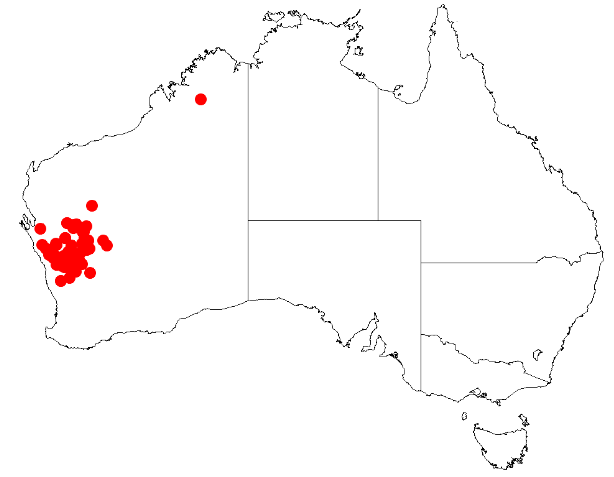
- Occurrence data from AVH

Synonyms
- Racosperma aulacophyllum (R.S.Cowan & Maslin) Pedley

Species of legume

Acacia aulacophylla is a species of flowering plant in the family Fabaceae and is endemic to the west of Western Australia. It is a shrub with linear phyllodes that are circular in cross section, spherical spikes of golden-yellow flowers, and linear pods up to 100 mm (3.9 in) long.

== Description ==
Acacia aulacophylla is a bushy, often rounded shrub that typically grows to a height of 1–4 m (3 ft 3 in – 13 ft 1 in) and has smooth, greyish bark and glabrous, cylindrical branchlets. Its phyllodes are ascending to erect, terete, mostly 75–120 mm (3.0–4.7 in) long and 1 mm (0.039 in) in diameter with eight veins and deep furrows between the veins. The flowers are golden-yellow and arranged in one or two spherical heads in axils, each head with 40 to 87 densely packed flowers and 5–6 mm (0.20–0.24 in) in diameter on a peduncle mostly 5–8 mm (0.20–0.31 in) long. Flowering mostly occurs from April to August, and the pods are glabrous, leathery, 60–100 mm (2.4–3.9 in) long and 5–6 mm (0.20–0.24 in) wide containing dull black, broadly elliptic seeds 4.5 mm (0.18 in) long with an aril on the end.

== Taxonomy ==
Acacia aulacophylla was first formally described in 1995 by the botanists Richard Sumner Cowan and Bruce Maslin in the journal Nuytsia from specimens collected by Maslin 1.6 km (0.99 mi) from Cue towards Meekatharra in 1974. The specific epithet (aulacophylla) means 'furrow-leaf' referring to the furrowed phyllodes.

== Distribution and habitat ==
This species of wattle grows on plains, breakaways, laterite or granite hills in open scrub, dominated by other species of Acacia, between Byro Station, Mullewa and Morawa, extending inland to Cue. It grows in clay, loamy, sandy or rocky soils, in the Avon Wheatbelt, Carnarvon, Geraldton Sandplains, Murchison and Yalgoo bioregions of Western Australia.

== Conservation status ==
Acacia aulacophylla is listed as "not threatened" by the Government of Western Australia Department of Biodiversity, Conservation and Attractions.

== See also ==
- List of Acacia species
