= River jam =

River jam is a common name of more than one plant:

- Acacia citrinoviridis, also known as black mulga
- Acacia coriacea, also known as wirewood or wiry wattle
