= Wantan =

Wantan is:

- an alternative spelling for wonton, a Chinese dumpling
- an alternative common name for black mulga, an Australian tree

== China ==
- Wantan, Henan (万滩镇), town in Zhongmu County
- Wantan, Wufeng County (湾潭镇), town in Hubei
- Wantan Township (湾潭乡), Hanchuan, Hubei
