= Milly Milly =

Pastoral lease in Western Australia

Coordinates: 26°04′27″S 116°41′38″E

Location in Western Australia

Milly Milly Station, most commonly referred to as Milly Milly, is a pastoral lease and operating sheep and cattle station located about 188 kilometres (117 mi) west of Meekatharra in the Mid-West of Western Australia. The neighbouring stations are Nookawarra to the south and Beringarra Station to the northeast.

== Description ==
The station occupies an area of 1,600,000 acres (647,497 ha), with the homestead situated alongside the Murchison River. The boundaries of the station are approximately 80 miles (129 km) from east to west and 70 miles (113 km) from north to south. The property has double frontage to 50 miles (80 km) stretch of the Wooramell River as well as a 37 miles (60 km) portion of the length of the Murchison River.

The area is well vegetated with mulga and salt bush as well as grass that grows in abundance and which was often cut to make hay. In 1910 25 tons of hay was cut and stacked for homestead stock.

== History ==
In 1909 the total recorded rainfall at Milly Milly was 15 inches (381 mm). The total rainfall for 1911 was 6.35 inches (161 mm) over 18 falls. In 1912 a total of 3.43 inches (87 mm) was recorded, and in 1913 6.35 inches (161 mm), measured over 31 falls. The average rainfall of the area is about 7.5 inches (191 mm).

The country was pioneered by T. O'Grady, his brother Robert O'Grady and two other men. O'Grady constructed a rudimentary hut and shearing shed a few miles from the current homestead. The party came down with a fever in their first year and a shepherd ended up taking the sick man to Geraldton in a cart for treatment. One of the men died during the journey. Upon returning the O'Gradys built the current homestead.

The station came into the hands of James Aitkin and Mr. Birrell prior to 1879. Birrell died afterwards leaving his share to be put up for auction, which in turn was acquired by Aitkin. Aitkin had moved over from Victoria in 1879 with enough capital to get Milly Milly well established.

The homestead was washed away in the floods of 1884, so a new one was built about 5 miles (8 km) from the old location. The new building was constructed of sandstone and limestone, both quarried locally with local salmon gum being used to provide timber. The floors are made of cement to prevent damage from termites. A large kitchen and roomy bedrooms are surrounded by a large verandah.

In 1886 the station sheared over 20,000 sheep and was managed by Archie Campbell, who had been there since 1883.

The Murchison district was hit by drought in 1891 but Milly Milly, along with Boolardy and Murgoo Station, was believed to be the best off.

Murder occurred at Milly Milly in 1893, when an Aboriginal woman was killed as she walked to Nookawarra Station with a worker from the station, Peter John Keeshan, where Keeshan was catching the mail coach. Keeshan was accused of the killing and went to trial but was found not guilty.

Flooding occurred at Milly Milly and other stations along the Murchison River, including Mileura, following heavy rains in March and April 1900. Buildings were washed away and much fencing was lost along with stock being drowned.

The station was briefly owned by Archibald M'Kellar of Geraldton, who had inherited it from his brother-in-law, James Aitken. M'Kellar, who was described as being "of eccentric disposition" died in 1904 and left a will leaving his estate to a cousin in Scotland and to hospitals in Perth, Fremantle and Geraldton, but neglected to specify the share each would receive.

It was acquired shortly afterwards by the Mulcahy brothers, Daniel and Michael, who were well known hoteliers in Perth, Fremantle and Kalgoorlie in 1905. The brothers left the property under the management of Fred Caeser, who had been manager at Milly Milly since about 1899.

The station had approximately 300 miles (483 km) of fencing and was under the management of Caeser in 1910. At the time the station was carrying 27,000 merinos, which gave an annual clip of 480 bales. 4,000 fat lambs were sold-off from the station the previous year. The station also carried a herd of 2,700 shorthorn cattle and 300 horses.

A second murder occurred at the station in November 1912; the cook, Jimmy Carlo, was arrested after the station accountant, Percy Tompkiss, was poisoned. Tompkiss' body was found to contain traces of arsenic, used in sheep dip, which it was thought he consumed in a bottle of whiskey. Carlo was committed to stand trial for murder in October 1913. At trial Carlos was acquitted on lack of evidence.

In 1914 the station was still owned by the Mulcahy family and stocked with between 8,000 and 10,000 sheep as well as approximately 1,500 cattle. The property boasted 48 windmills, mostly shallow but some to a depth of 120 feet (37 m). G. R. Monger had managed the station since 1912.

In 1917 Michael Mulcahy died leaving his brother Daniel to carry on their pastoral and hotel interests. Daniel died in June 1925 at his home in Fremantle at age 58. His wife and 10 children were at Milly Milly at that time and received the news via Byro Station.

In 1925 the trustees of the late Daniel Mulcahy purchased the thoroughbred stallion Star Comedy, the third sire bought for the station over the last few years. The first was Mait Mark, who died shortly after arriving and the second, Hostage, was euthanased after breaking a leg. Star Comedy was a foal of Comedy King, a Melbourne Cup winner.

The Mulcahy family turned down some offers on the property, including one for £80,000 in 1930.

Rain from the remains of Cyclone Emma in 2006 caused flooding along much of the Murchison River including Milly Milly, where the homestead resembled a small island of dry land among the floodwaters that submerged much of the property.

The station had a poor season with drought striking in 2010. The station manager, Simon Broad, had been feeding stock with lupins and hay as a result of lack of feed on the ground. Calves had to be separated from their mothers and penned near the homestead where they were fed milk replacement pills.

The lessee in 2012 was the Milly Milly Pastoral company. The station is operating under the Crown Lease number CL139-1967 and has the Land Act number LA3114/625.

== See also ==
- List of ranches and stations
- List of reduplicated Australian place names
- List of the largest stations in Australia
