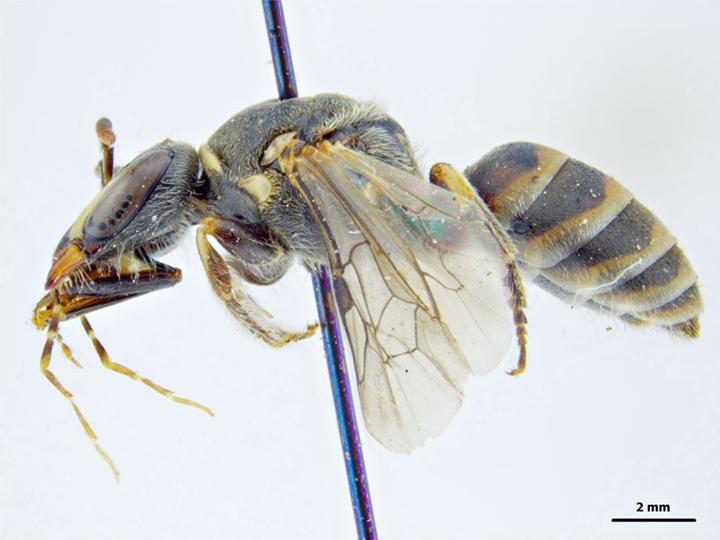
- Female

Scientific classification
- Kingdom: Animalia
- Phylum: Arthropoda
- Clade: Pancrustacea
- Class: Insecta
- Order: Hymenoptera
- Family: Colletidae
- Genus: Hylaeus
- Species: H. mirandus

Binomial name
- Hylaeus mirandus (Rayment, 1930)

Synonyms
- Meroglossa miranda Rayment, 1930

= Hylaeus mirandus =

Species of bee

Hylaeus mirandus, or Hylaeus (Pseudhylaeus) mirandus, is a species of bee in the family Colletidae and subfamily Hylaeinae. It is endemic to Australia. It was described by Australian entomologist Tarlton Rayment in 1930.

== Description ==
Male body length is about 8 mm. Integumental colouration is mainly black, with cream markings. Rayment comments: "The exceedingly long palpi and the extraordinary abdominal processes distinguish it as one of the most remarkable bees yet described."

== Distribution and habitat ==
The species occurs in Western Australia. The type locality is Milly Milly Station in the Mid West region.

== Behaviour ==
The adults are flying mellivores. Flowering plants visited by the bees include Eremophila species.

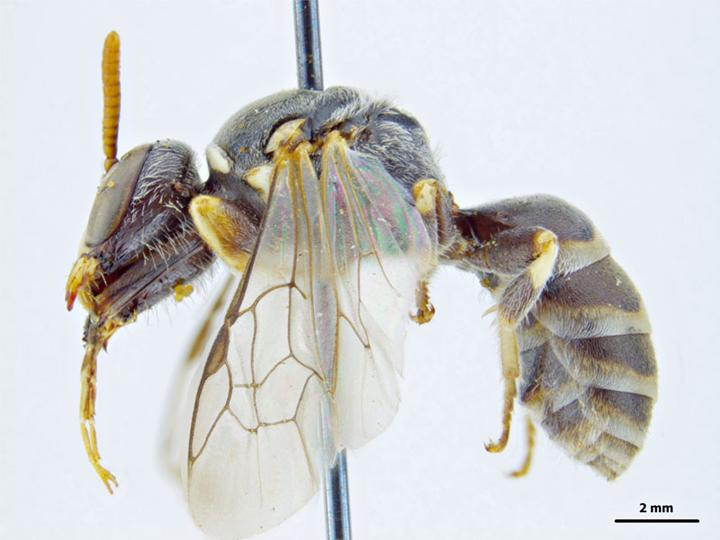
Male
