= Mount Narryer =

Mountain in the Mid West region of Western Australia

- Location within Western Australia

Highest point
- Elevation: 469 m (1,539 ft)
- Coordinates: 26°31′22″S 116°22′51″E

Geography
- Location: Mid West region of Western Australia
- Parent range: Hamersley Range

Mount Narryer is a mountain in Western Australia.

It is located about 208 kilometres (129 mi) north of Yalgoo and 214 kilometres (133 mi) north east of Kalbarri in the Mid West region of Western Australia. Situated along the Murchison River, the mountain is surrounded by mulga scrubland.

The mountain itself is a fin shaped rocky outcrop 27 kilometres (17 mi) long and 3 kilometres (2 mi) wide, and juts out from the red sandy desert floor.

Mount Narryer is within the boundaries of Mount Narryer Station, which was established in about 1880.

Tiny fragments of zircon collected from Mount Narryer and the nearby Jack Hills have been dated at over four billion years old.

== See also ==
- List of ranches and stations
