= Cyclone Emma (2006) =

Category 1 Australian region cyclone in 2006

Tropical Cyclone Emma
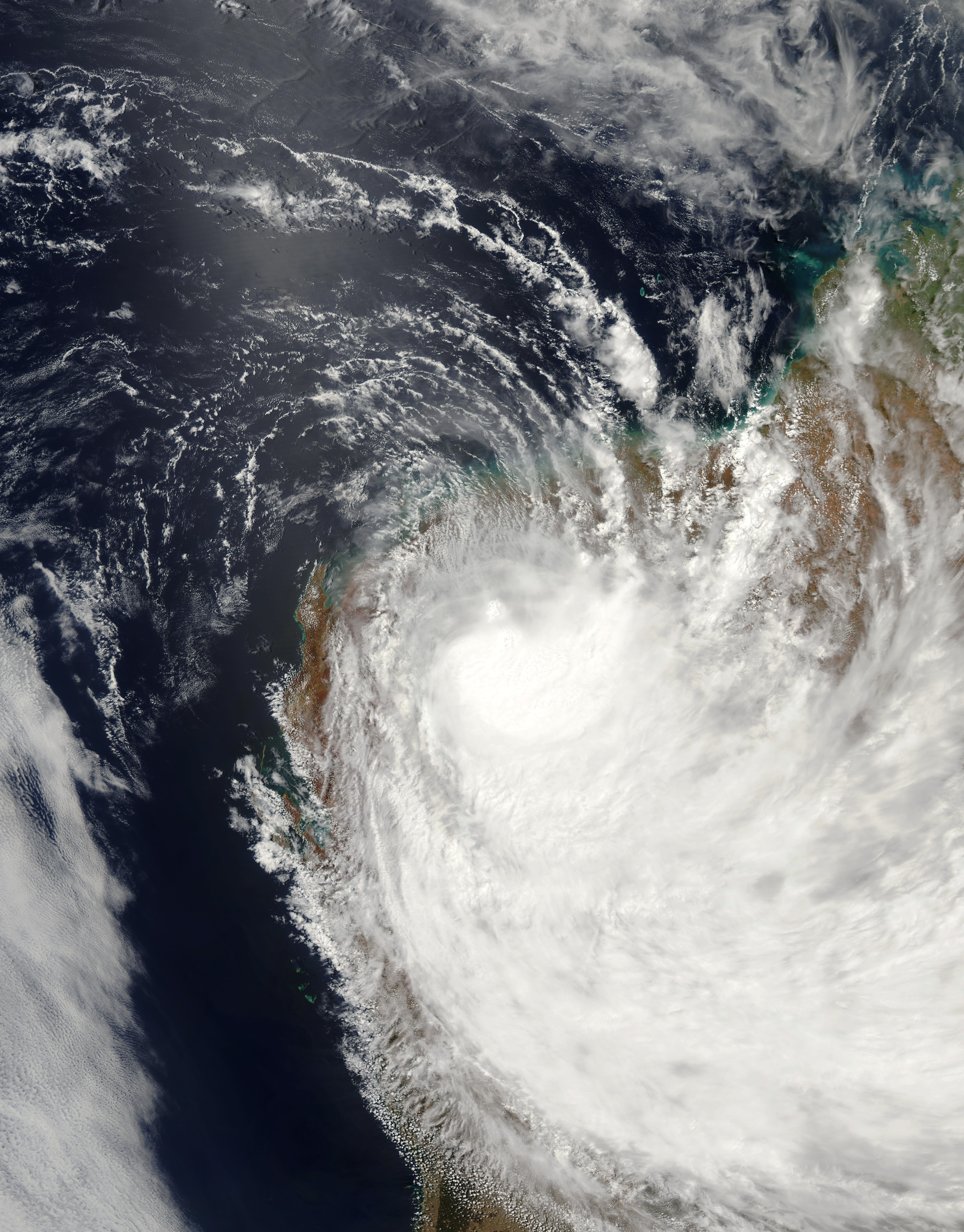
- Satellite image of Cyclone Emma covering a large portion of Western Australia

Meteorological history
- Formed: 25 February 2006
- Dissipated: 1 March 2006

Category 1 tropical cyclone
- 10-minute sustained (BOM)
- Highest winds: 75 km/h (45 mph)
- Highest gusts: 95 km/h (60 mph)
- Lowest pressure: 988 hPa (mbar); 29.18 inHg

Tropical storm
- 1-minute sustained (SSHWS/JTWC)
- Highest winds: 65 km/h (40 mph)

Overall effects
- Fatalities: None reported
- Damage: A$1 million
- Areas affected: Western Australia
- IBTrACS
- Part of the 2005–06 Australian region cyclone season

Tropical Cyclone Emma was a weak but unusually large tropical cyclone that affected a substantial portion of Western Australia during the 2005–06 Australian region cyclone season. Forming out of an area of low pressure on 25 February, the precursor to Emma slowly tracked southward. Although classified tropical, the structure of the system represented that of a monsoonal storm. However, low wind shear and well-developed outflow gradually allowed convection to develop near the centre of circulation. As the system approached the Pilbara coastline of Western Australia on 27 February, it intensified into a Category 1 cyclone and attained peak 10-minute sustained winds of 75 km/h (47 mph). After moving inland near Mardie, Emma weakened to a tropical low but became exceedingly large; its cloud cover obscured most of Western Australia. The remnants of the weak storm persisted until 1 March, at which time they dissipated over the Great Australian Bight.

Although a weak storm, rainfall from Emma caused flooding in numerous parts of Western Australia. In Karratha, six people required rescue after their cars became stranded in floodwaters. The most significant damage took place along the Murchison River which swelled to roughly 20 km (12 mi) in width. Although only one town was threatened by the river, large areas of farmland were inundated by the expanding river, leading to substantial agricultural losses. Despite the extensive flooding, no fatalities were reported as a result of Emma.

== Meteorological history ==
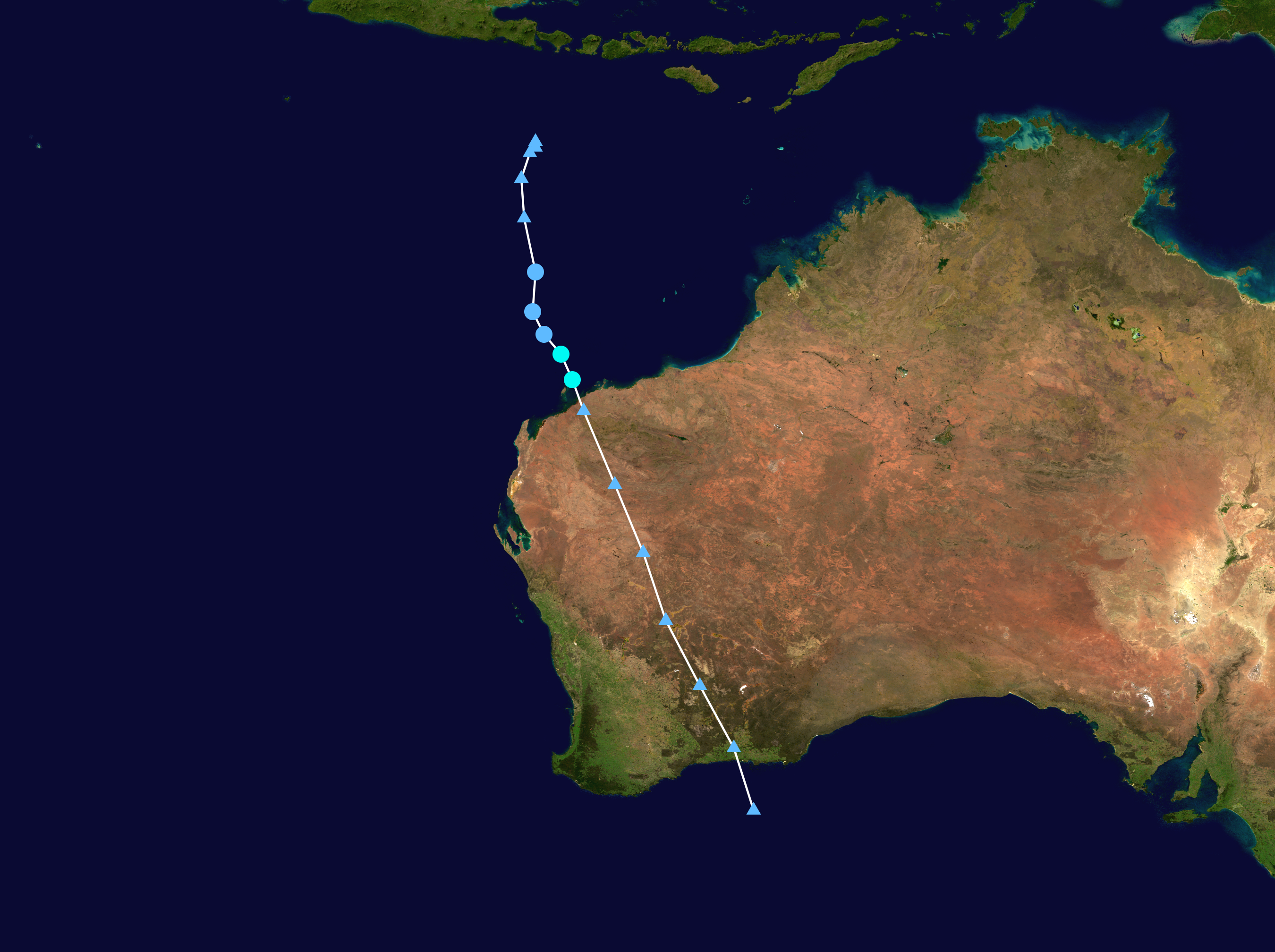
Map plotting the storm's track and intensity, according to the Saffir–Simpson scale Map key Saffir–Simpson scale Tropical depression (≤38 mph, ≤62 km/h) Tropical storm (39–73 mph, 63–118 km/h) Category 1 (74–95 mph, 119–153 km/h) Category 2 (96–110 mph, 154–177 km/h) Category 3 (111–129 mph, 178–208 km/h) Category 4 (130–156 mph, 209–251 km/h) Category 5 (≥157 mph, ≥252 km/h) Unknown Storm type Tropical cyclone Subtropical cyclone Extratropical cyclone, remnant low, tropical disturbance, or monsoon depression

Tropical Cyclone Emma originated from an area of low pressure that formed to the southeast of Java on 22 February 2006. Over the following few days, a monsoonal trough developed over the Timor Sea, leading to an increased likelihood of tropical cyclone formation from the initial low within several days. On 25 February, the Australian Bureau of Meteorology began monitoring the system as a tropical low. The low tracked slowly towards the south throughout the day and the centre of circulation relocated farther south late on 26 February. By this time, the Bureau of Meteorology anticipated the low to develop into a tropical cyclone and attain winds of 95 km/h (59 mph) 10-minute sustained) before moving over land in Western Australia.

Early on 27 February, the Joint Typhoon Warning Center (JTWC) classified the system as a tropical depression. During the day, a QuikSCAT pass revealed a broad low-level circulation with the highest winds located around the periphery of the storm, a characteristic of monsoonal systems. Although it was situated within a region of low wind shear and underneath an anticyclone, convective activity was mostly present in the system's large outer bands. Later that day, the Bureau of Meteorology upgraded the system to a Category 1 cyclone on the Australian intensity scale and named it Emma. At this time, Emma was located roughly 305 km (190 mi) north of Onslow, Western Australia. Several hours later, the JTWC classified Emma as Tropical Storm 15S following the development of convection near the centre of circulation.

The storm continued to track southward in response to a strong mid to upper-level ridge situated over central Australia. Emma attained its peak wind speed of 75 km/h (47 mph) 10-minute sustained) late on 27 February as it neared landfall. However, the JTWC assessed Emma to have been slightly weaker, peaking with winds of 65 km/h (40 mph) 1-minute sustained). The storm maintained this intensity through its landfall early on 28 February near Mardie along the Pilbara coastline. Shortly after moving over land, the JTWC declared Emma extratropical and issued their final advisory on the storm. The Bureau of Meteorology, however, continued to monitor the cyclone as it rapidly tracked over Western Australia. Over land, the storm became unusually large, with outer bands from the storm covering most of Western Australia. Late on 28 February, the lowest barometric pressure in relation to Emma, 988 hPa (29.18 inHg), was recorded at Meekatharra. The remnants of Emma persisted through most of 1 March before the system moved over the Great Australian Bight and dissipated.

The Australian Bureau of Meteorology uses 10-minute sustained winds, while the Joint Typhoon Warning Center uses one-minute sustained winds. The Bureau of Meteorology's peak intensity for Emma was 75 km/h (47 mph) 10-minute sustained, or 85 km/h (53 mph) one-minute sustained. The JTWC's peak intensity for Emma was 65 km/h (40 mph) one-minute sustained, or 55 km/h (34 mph) 10-minute sustained.

== Preparations and impact ==
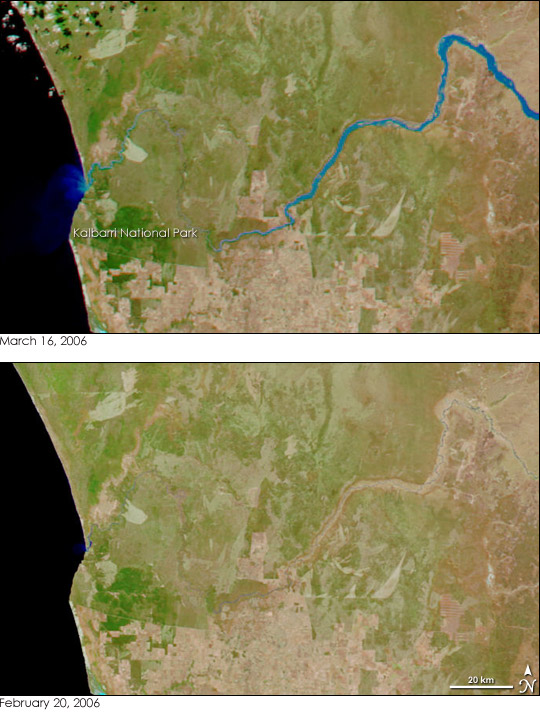
The Murchison River at the height of the flooding on 16 March (top) compared to its normal level (bottom)

Ahead of the storm, oil and mining operations in threatened regions were temporarily shut down. Already suffering from the impacts of Cyclones Clare and Daryl, residents were warned about the likelihood of flooding due to the already saturated grounds. The Bureau of Meteorology also issued tropical cyclone warnings for most of the Pilbara coastline on 28 February. The same day, the Fire and Emergency Services of Australia issued a Yellow Alert for Point Samson, Roebourne, Wickham, Dampier, Karratha, and Mardie. Residents in these areas were advised to evacuate if necessary and ensure that all cyclone preparations had been completed. Shelters were also opened for residents who sought need for one. Schools throughout the Pilbara region were also closed for several days as a result of the storm.

Due to the low intensity of the storm at landfall, little or no wind damage took place from Emma. On land, sustained winds were recorded up to 78 km/h (48 mph) and gusts up to 95 km/h (59 mph). A storm surge of 0.8 m (2.6 ft) was recorded at Dampier but, no damage resulted from it. Heavy rains produced by the storm caused moderate to severe flooding in Western Australia. In Karratha, six people were rescued from two cars after they became stranded on a flooded road. Total rainfall from the storm was 306 mm (12.0 in), recorded at Karratha Airport. Localised flooding was reported in Pannawonica and Tom Price. Some buildings reported minor flooding but overall structural damage was minimal. The 190 mm (7.5 in) of rain that fell in a 24-hour span in Karratha pushed the city above its annual average rainfall totals in the first two months of the year. Near the Yarraloola Station, the Robe River overflowed its banks, inundating the area and forcing the evacuation of everyone in the homestead. In the Gascoyne region 30 cattle drowned after flood waters rapidly overtook a pasture.

In the Murchison region, rainfall exceeding 100 mm (3.9 in) brought the worst floods in decades, inundating numerous farms and causing substantial agricultural losses. Two weeks after the storm passed, the mouth of the Murchison River was closed after a ship became stranded in the swollen river. By 14 March, the river had broadened to roughly 20 km (12 mi) in places normally 500 m (1,600 ft) in width. These values marked the largest flood ever recorded in the river's history. Officials distributed sandbags to build temporary levee to protect low-lying areas. The largest operation took place at Kalbarri, near the mouth of the river, where 60 firefighters and 18 volunteers worked to put up 9,000 sandbags. The Billabalong and Twinpeaks stations were also isolated from surrounding areas after the Murchison River inundated the area. Several stations in the area remained under water for over a month and farmers requested urgent assistance from the government to help alleviate losses. Initial damage from the storm was placed at A$1 million ($706,580 USD).

Flood waters from the Murchison River finally began to recede on 17 March; however, it took several weeks for the river to return to its normal level. Although Emma had only minor effects in Carnarvon, the town enacted a A$14 million (US$10 million) flood protection plan in the wake of the storm. The plan would lead to the construction of new levees in areas surrounding the town and keep flood waters within Nicol Bay Flats. Additionally, four sections of the North West Coastal Highway were set to be upgraded for similar reasons. Due to the combined effects of Cyclones Clare, Darryl, Jim, Emma, Kate and Glenda, gold production in Australia fell by 8 percent, resulting in earnings losses of A$130 million.

In January 2006, the town of Lake Grace in the south of the state was flooded by Cyclone Clare, receiving 230 mm of rainfall. It was declared a disaster zone by the State Government. Just over two weeks later, the town received another 30 mm of rain from Cyclone Emma. Large pumps were brought in to help dry out flooded roads, and the main highway to Perth was reopened six weeks later.

== See also ==
- 2005–06 Australian region cyclone season
- List of cyclones in Western Australia
