= Richard Goldsmith Burges =

Australian politician

The Honourable Richard Burges

Member of the Legislative Council of Western Australia
- In office 16 July 1894 – March 1903
- Preceded by: None (new seat)
- Succeeded by: Andrew Dempster
- Constituency: East Province

Member of the Legislative Assembly of Western Australia
- In office 6 April 1903 – 25 September 1905
- Preceded by: Frederick Monger
- Succeeded by: Frederick Monger
- Constituency: York

Personal details
- Born: 4 December 1847 York, Western Australia, Australia
- Died: 25 September 1905 (aged 57) Gawler, South Australia, Australia

Richard Goldsmith Burges (4 December 1847 – 25 September 1905) was an Australian pastoralist and politician who served in both houses of the Parliament of Western Australia. He was a member of the Legislative Council from 1894 to 1903, and then served in the Legislative Assembly from 1903 until his death.

Burges was born in York, Western Australia, to Vittoria (née Meares) and Samuel Evans Burges. His older half-brother, Thomas Burges, was also a member of parliament, as were two of his uncles, William and Lockier Burges. Burges eventually took over Tipperary, his father's property near York, having earlier held various leases in the North-West. He was elected to the York Roads Board in 1882, and served until his death, including as chairman for a period. Burges entered parliament at the 1894 Legislative Council elections, as one of three members for the new East Province. He was re-elected in 1898, but resigned in March 1903 to contest a Legislative Assembly by-election for the seat of York, caused by the bankruptcy of Frederick Monger. Burges won the by-election, and was subsequently re-elected at the 1904 state election. He died in office in September 1905 (aged 57), having caught pneumonia while returning from a trip to the eastern states and then suffered heart failure. Burges had married Mona Phillips in 1878, with whom he had seven children. Both his father-in-law, Samuel Pole Phillips, and brother-in-law, Samuel James Phillips, were also members of parliament.
