= Harry Griffiths (politician) =

Australian politician

Member of the Legislative Assembly of Western Australia
- In office 12 October 1914 – 12 March 1921
- Preceded by: Frederick Monger
- Succeeded by: Charles Latham
- Constituency: York
- In office 22 March 1924 – 23 March 1935
- Preceded by: Tom Harrison
- Succeeded by: Ignatius Boyle
- Constituency: Avon

Personal details
- Born: 30 September 1866 Manchester, Lancashire, England
- Died: 23 March 1935 (aged 68) West Perth, Western Australia, Australia
- Party: Country

Harry Albert Craven Griffiths (sometimes Craven-Griffiths; 30 September 1866 – 23 March 1935) was an Australian politician who served as a Country Party member of the Legislative Assembly of Western Australia from 1914 to 1921 and from 1924 until his death.

== Biography ==
Griffiths was born in Manchester, England, to Eleanor Alice (née Cooke) and Henry Craven Griffiths. He came to Western Australia in 1897, during the gold rush, and lived in Kalgoorlie until 1907, when he moved to a property at Kellerberrin. Griffiths was involved in the establishment of the Farmers and Settlers' Association in the early 1910s, and at the 1914 state election was elected to parliament as a representative of the Country Party, its political wing. He held the seat of York until the 1921 election, when an irregularity in his nomination meant he was unable to recontest.

At the 1922 Legislative Council election, Griffiths unsuccessfully contested East Province as an "Independent Country" candidate, losing to Vernon Hamersley. He re-entered parliament at the 1924 state election, winning the seat of Avon from the sitting Country member, Tom Harrison. He and Harrison had joined separate factions of the party after its 1923 split. Griffiths was re-elected on three more occasions before his death in office in March 1935 (aged 68). He had been married twice, having four children by his first wife.

Parliament of Western Australia
Preceded by Frederick Monger	Member for York; 1914–1921	Succeeded by Charles Latham
Preceded by Tom Harrison	Member for Avon; 1924–1935	Succeeded by Ignatius Boyle
