= Billabalong Station =

Coordinates: 27.422°S 115.834°E

Location in Western Australia

Billabalong Station is a pastoral lease that once operated as a sheep station but currently operates as cattle station in Western Australia.

It is located 128 kilometres (80 mi) north of Mullewa and 204 kilometres (127 mi) west of Cue in the Mid West region. The Murchison River runs along the eastern boundary of the property.

The station currently occupies an area of 130,979 hectares (323,656 acres) leasehold and 59 hectares (146 acres) freehold. The homestead was built in the early 1900s and has five bedrooms and two bathrooms. The property also has a hangar, two workshops, generator shed, four sets of cattle yards, and a shearing shed with quarters. The lands are divided into 17 paddocks and watered by 23 wells, 16 bores and 38 windmills and was supporting a herd of 450 cattle in 2013, but able to carry a total of 8,000 head.

The property was acquired by a partnership between Andrew Dempster and John Chow Miller in 1893 from the executors of Thomas Burges. The partnership dissolved after financial disputes and the property, along with Berin Station, was put up for auction in 1897. Billabalong comprised a total of 196,630 acres (79,573 ha), had a six-room homestead, stone shearing shed and 100 miles (161 km) of fencing. It was stocked with 7,000 sheep, 1,400 head of cattle and 100 horses.

Following Dempster's death the executors of his will put the property up for auction in 1909. At this stage it occupied an area of 800,000 acres (323,749 ha) and was stocked with 12,000 sheep, 2,500 head of cattle and 71 horses. The property was passed in with the highest bid being £21,000.

The Darlot brothers acquired Billabalong and Byro Stations in 1914. Billabalong had lost the northern portion of the leasehold, it having been acquired by J. & C. Butcher in August 1913. The southern portion acquired by the Darlots only occupied 350,000 acres (141,640 ha) and was running 15,000 sheep and 600 cattle. The Darlots intended to make many improvements and use Byro for breeding and Billabalong as a depot.

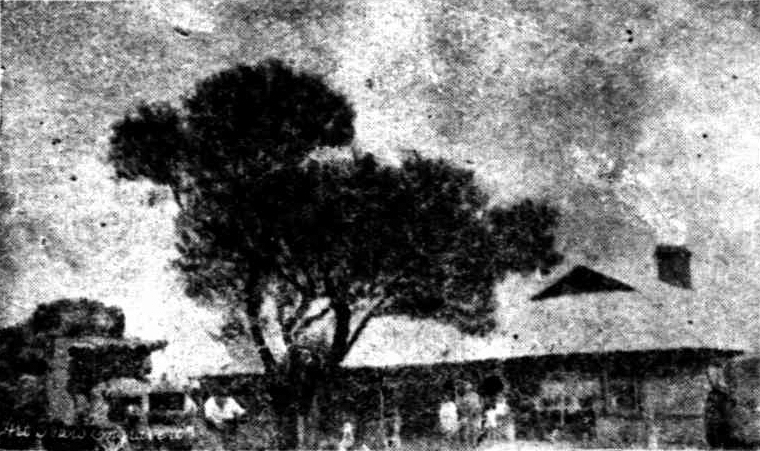
Billabalong Station in 1922

Angus Campbell, who had opened up Boologooroo, was appointed as station manager in 1916 and the station progressed under his management, producing the highest wool clip to pass through Geraldton in 1919. Campbell died of heart failure in 1939 while still in charge of the property.

Following Cyclone Emma in 2006, both Billabalong and Twinpeaks station were isolated from surrounding areas after the Murchison River inundated the area. Several stations in the area remained under water for over a month and farmers requested urgent assistance from the government to help alleviate losses.

== See also ==
- List of ranches and stations
