= Electoral district of York =

Former state electoral district of Western Australia

York Western Australia—Legislative Assembly
- State: Western Australia
- Dates current: 1890–1950
- Namesake: York

York was an electoral district of the Legislative Assembly in the Australian state of Western Australia from 1890 to 1950.

The district was based on the rural town of York lying to the east of Perth. It was one of the original 30 seats contested at the 1890 election.

York was abolished at the 1950 election. Its last member, Charles Perkins of the Country Party, transferred to the seat of Roe.

== Members ==
Member	Party	Term
Stephen Henry Parker	Non-aligned	1890–1892
Frederick Monger	Ministerial	1892–1903
Richard Burges	Ministerial	1903–1905
Frederick Monger	Ministerial	1905–1911
Frederick Monger	Liberal	1911–1914
Harry Griffiths	Country	1914–1921
Charles Latham	Country	1921–1923
Charles Latham	Country (MCP)	1923–1924
Charles Latham	Nationalist	1924–1928
Charles Latham	Country	1928–1942
Charles Perkins	Country	1942–1950
