= Tallering Station =

Pastoral lease in Western Australia

Coordinates: 28.376°S 115.851°E

Location in Western Australia

Tallering Station is a pastoral lease that has previously operated as a sheep station but now is a cattle station in Western Australia.

It is located approximately 30 kilometres (19 mi) north of Mullewa and 120 km (75 mi) north east of Geraldton in the Mid West region of Western Australia. The property is bordered to the east by Gabyon Station.

The area was first grazed in the 1860s, with a road being built through the area in 1876. In 1903 several smaller leases were combined by Messrs. Elliot and Cornish into one station, which they named after Tallering Peak, a hill in the north west corner of the property. It is one of the last properties to have been taken up in the Murchison.

Tallering was placed on the market along with Wandina Station in 2016. Tallering occupied an area of 165,500 ha (409,000 acres) and Wandina an area of 79,727 ha (197,010 acres). Tallering was advertised as being able to support a flock of 11,900 sheep, had 30 watering points, is well fenced and has a grand homestead.

The property was acquired by Hamilton Agriculture, an eastern states agricultural company in 2017.

== See also ==
- List of ranches and stations
- List of pastoral leases in Western Australia
