= Nookawarra Station =

Pastoral lease in Western Australia

Coordinates: 26°18′06.52″S 116°52′43.41″E

Location in Western Australia

Nookawarra Station is a pastoral lease and sheep station located in the Mid West region of Western Australia. The station occupies an area of approximately 604,000 acres (244,430 ha).

Situated approximately 350 kilometres (217 mi) to the north-east of Geraldton, it includes a good length of the Murchison River within its boundary. The property adjoins Boolardy, Milly Milly and Mileura Stations.

== Early history ==
The station was taken up as early as 1875 by Edward Wittenoom and his brother Frank Wittenoom; Edward moved on after about five years but Frank stayed on and sold the property in 1926.

The Murchison amateur racing club was established at Nookawarra by Frank Wittenoom in 1881. Races were held at the property for the next 16 years with Wittenoom winning many races.

In 1886, the 500,000-acre (202,343 ha) property held 10,000 sheep under the management of Mr. J. Judge, as well as 250 cattle and 170 horses. It was observed at this time that the land was in good condition and was open grass plain lightly wooded with gum trees, acacia and mulga. The property was watered with clay holes and shallow wells.

The Governor of Western Australia, Frederick Broome, visited the station as part of his tour of the Mid West in 1887.

The Murchison pastoral show was held at the station showgrounds in 1894.

Charles Pretlove, who died in 1898, managed the station during the mid-1890s.

John Hearn managed the station in the late 1890s for Wittenoom; he later went to purchase Gabyon Station.

Edward Telfer also managed the station in the early 1900s.

John Judge managed the station through the 1900s; he died in 1909 in Geraldton hospital after a protracted illness.

An Aboriginal man named Peter was killed by two other Aborigines at the station in 1912. The two men accused were thought to have killed him as part of a revenge attack. The two accused were later released for lack of a witness.

1929 was a good year, with 13,000 sheep and lambs being clipped for satisfactory results. The flock contained 3,800 lambs and the blowfly was said to be very active and needing extra attention. The station also made a "satisfactory" cattle sale.

== Notable events ==
Jack Smith, an employee at Nookawarra, was accidentally shot in the chest with a .310 rifle. The mishap occurred in 1949 when Smith and another man were shooting from the car they were in and a rifle accidentally discharged. The bullet entered Smith's chest, pierced his lung and exited through his back. Smith was taken to Geraldton hospital to recover.

Les Schubert purchased the station from Nookawarra Pastoral Company for $75,000 in 1972 when it was carrying 22,000 sheep. Wool prices were disastrously low at the time.

On 9 October 1985, Mervyn Tomkins ran out of fuel and crashed his airplane, a Cessna 150G VH-KPP, on the property while out mustering sheep with a number of jackaroos on the ground on motorcycles. He survived with no substantial injuries. The aircraft was replaced by Cessna 150L VH-EKL in 1992.

Mervyn Tomkins, station manager in 1997, was cleared of dumping a pair of jackaroos, Bradley John Carr, 21, and Benjamin Goeree, 19 in the desert in 1997.

== See also ==
- List of pastoral leases in Western Australia
