= Frederick Monger =

Australian businessman and politician

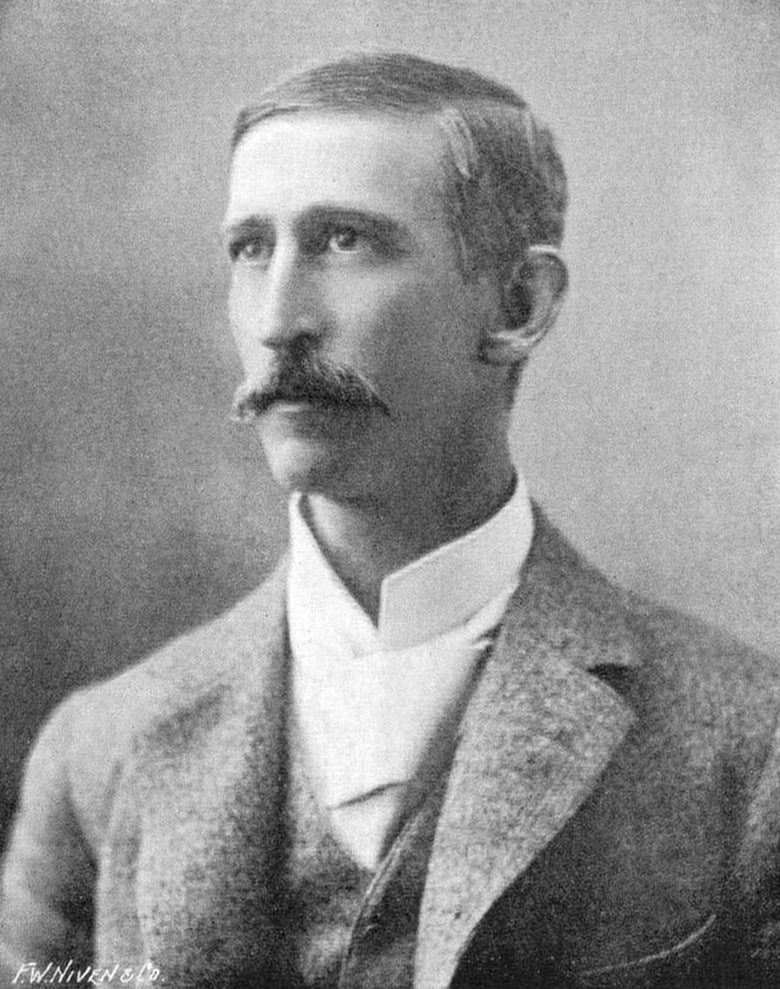

Member of the Legislative Assembly of Western Australia
- In office 27 October 1892 – 24 March 1903 (Note: From 15 to 26 June 1899, the period between his resignation and his re-election, Monger was not technically a member of parliament.)
- Preceded by: Stephen Henry Parker
- Succeeded by: Richard Burges
- Constituency: York
- In office 27 October 1905 – 21 October 1914
- Preceded by: Richard Burges
- Succeeded by: Harry Griffiths
- Constituency: York

Personal details
- Born: 25 January 1863 York, Western Australia, Australia
- Died: 15 November 1919 (aged 56) Subiaco, Western Australia, Australia

Frederick Charles Monger (25 January 1863 – 15 November 1919) was an Australian businessman and politician who was a member of the Legislative Assembly of Western Australia from 1892 to 1903 and again from 1905 to 1914, representing the seat of York. He and his father, John Henry Monger, were the first father–son pair to be elected to the Parliament of Western Australia.

== Early life ==
Monger was born in York, Western Australia, to Henrietta Joaquina (née Manning) and John Henry Monger. Both his father and uncle (Joseph Taylor Monger) were members of the Legislative Council. Monger was sent to Melbourne to be educated, attending Wesley College, and on his return began working for his father. He later involved himself in various mining ventures, and for a period was a joint owner of Wooramel Station (near Carnarvon). Outside of his business interests, Monger was a keen player of Australian rules football, playing two seasons for the Rovers Football Club in the early years of the West Australian Football League (WAFL).

== Politics ==
Monger was elected to the council of the York Municipality in 1892, but resigned later in the year to contest a by-election for the seat of York, which had been vacated by Stephen Henry Parker. He was elected unopposed, and supported the government of John Forrest once he had been sworn in. In 1899, Monger declared bankruptcy, and had to vacate his seat, although he won it back at the subsequent by-election. He was again declared bankrupt in 1903, and was replaced in parliament by Richard Burges, having chosen not to re-contest his seat. Monger returned to parliament in October 1905, following Burges's death. He held York until being defeated by a Country Party candidate, Harry Griffiths, at the 1914 state election. He was again defeated by Griffiths at the 1917 election, and subsequently retired from public life. Monger died in Perth in November 1919, aged 56.

== Notes ==
Parliament of Western Australia
Preceded by Stephen Parker; Richard Burges	Member for York; 1892–1903; 1905–1914	Succeeded by Richard Burges; Harry Griffiths
