= Cyclone Clare =

Category 3 Australian region cyclone in 2006

Severe Tropical Cyclone Clare
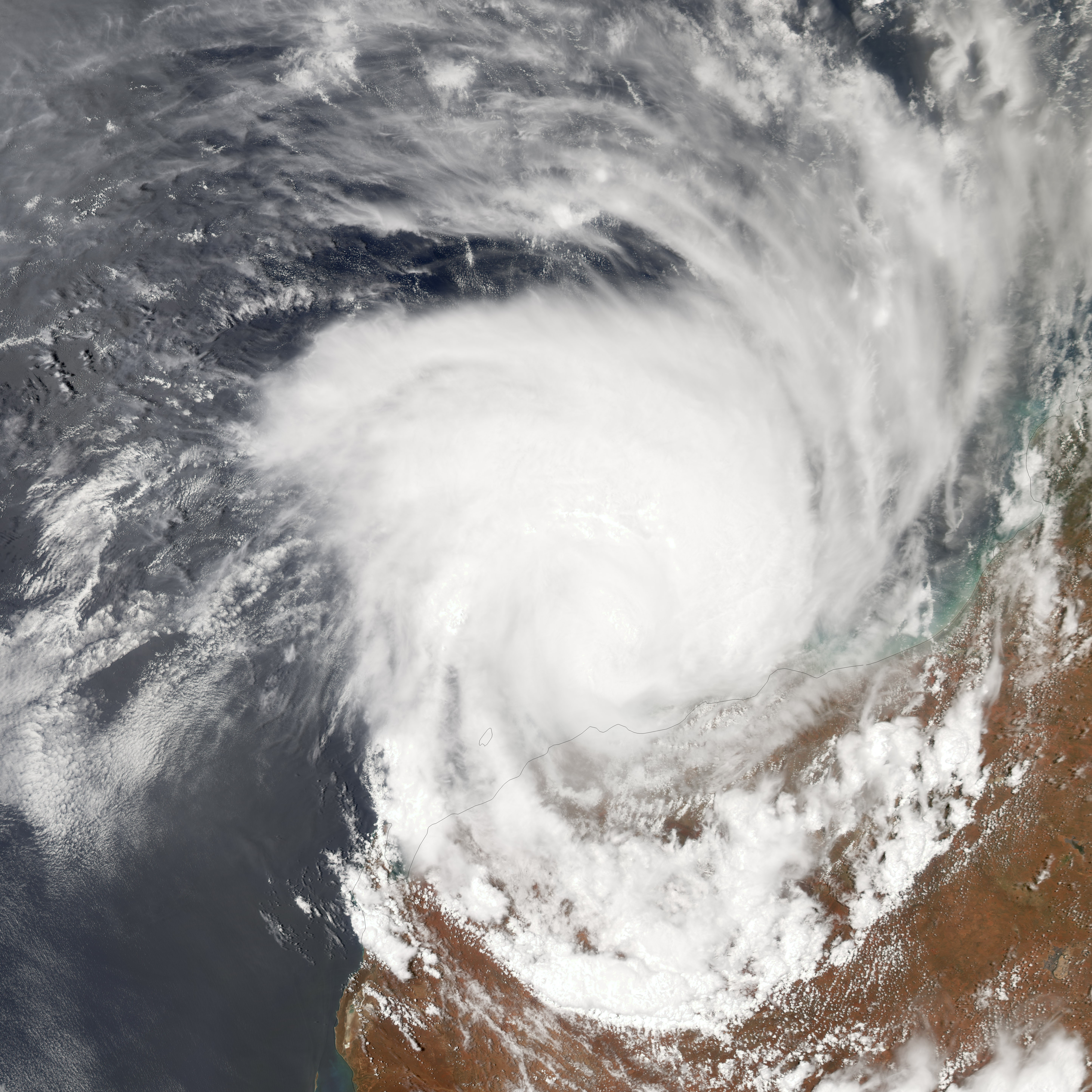
- Satellite image of Cyclone Clare

Meteorological history
- Formed: 6 January 2006
- Dissipated: 10 January 2006

Category 3 severe tropical cyclone
- 10-minute sustained (Aus)
- Highest winds: 140 km/h (85 mph)
- Lowest pressure: 960 hPa (mbar); 28.35 inHg

Tropical storm
- 1-minute sustained (SSHWS/JTWC)
- Highest winds: 110 km/h (70 mph)
- Lowest pressure: 980 hPa (mbar); 28.94 inHg

Overall effects
- Fatalities: None reported
- Damage: $2.3 million (2006 USD)
- Areas affected: Western Australia
- IBTrACS
- Part of the 2005–06 Australian region cyclone season

Severe Tropical Cyclone Clare was a moderately strong cyclone that struck Western Australia in January 2006. The storm formed as an area of low pressure in the Arafura Sea, and moved westward. After receiving the name Clare on 7 January, the system ultimately peaked at Category 3 intensity on the Australian tropical cyclone scale. It moved ashore on the coast of the Pilbara and proceeded inland, dissipating on 10 January. Clare produced winds of 142 km/h (88 mph) at Karratha and triggered widespread torrential rainfall that led to flooding. Following its usage, the name Clare was retired by the Bureau of Meteorology, and will never be used again for a tropical cyclone in the area.

== Meteorological history ==
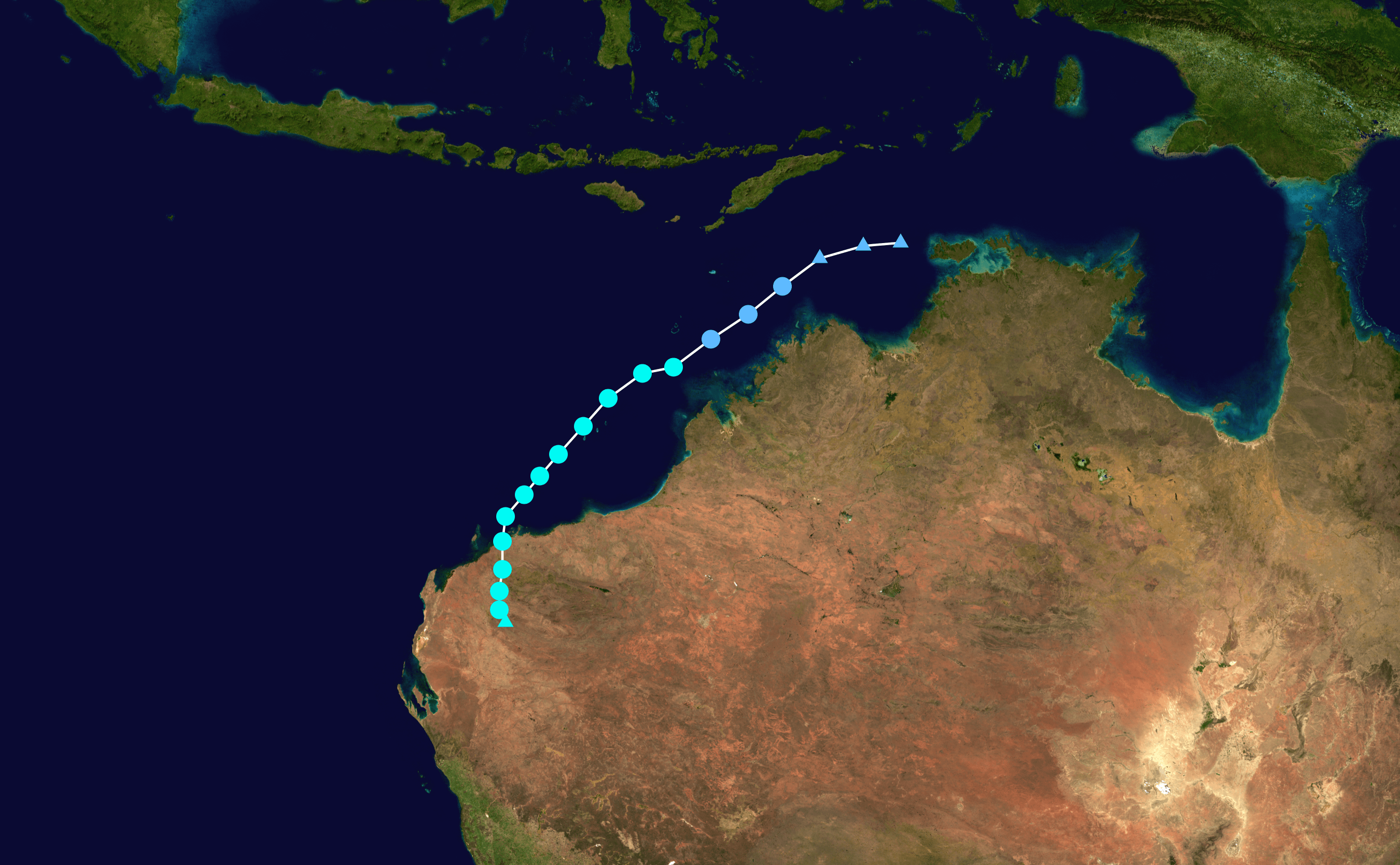
Map plotting the storm's track and intensity, according to the Saffir–Simpson scale Map key Saffir–Simpson scale Tropical depression (≤38 mph, ≤62 km/h) Tropical storm (39–73 mph, 63–118 km/h) Category 1 (74–95 mph, 119–153 km/h) Category 2 (96–110 mph, 154–177 km/h) Category 3 (111–129 mph, 178–208 km/h) Category 4 (130–156 mph, 209–251 km/h) Category 5 (≥157 mph, ≥252 km/h) Unknown Storm type Tropical cyclone Subtropical cyclone Extratropical cyclone, remnant low, tropical disturbance, or monsoon depression

On 4 January 2006, a weak area of low pressure was situated in the Arafura Sea. It moved westward, and by 6 January, it was located in the Timor Sea. That same day, both the United States Joint Typhoon Warning Center (JTWC) and the Australian Bureau of Meteorology (BoM) identified the system as a tropical disturbance. On 7 January, the low began to show signs of strengthening. Continuing to organise, the BoM designated it as Tropical Cyclone Clare shortly thereafter. At the time, it was centred approximately 265 mi (426 km) to the north of Broome and moving west-southwestward. The JTWC classified the cyclone, locally designated 05S, as a tropical storm at 1800 UTC.

By early on 8 January, the storm had begun to steadily gain power. Later that day, Clare achieved severe tropical cyclone status while located around 170 mi (270 km) north of Port Hedland. Tracking southwestward, the storm continued to mature. On 9 January, the JTWC estimated the storm to have peaked in intensity with maximum sustained 1-minute winds of 110 km/h (70 mph) and a minimum barometric pressure of 980 millibars. However, the BoM reported the storm to have been somewhat more intense, with sustained 10-minute winds of 140 km/h (85 mph) and a barometric pressure of 964 millibars. This made Clare a Category 3 on the Australian tropical cyclone scale.

Clare maintained roughly the same intensity as its track became more southerly. At 1600 UTC on 9 January the storm made landfall at the Pilbara to the west of Dampier. Heading ashore, the storm began to quickly deteriorate, and both the JTWC and the BoM declared it dissipated on 10 January as it continued southward. Throughout the storm's course, the JTWC's intensity estimates were below that of the BoM. Also, it is reported that the cyclone's presentation on satellite was not representative of its actual intensity.

== Preparations and impact ==
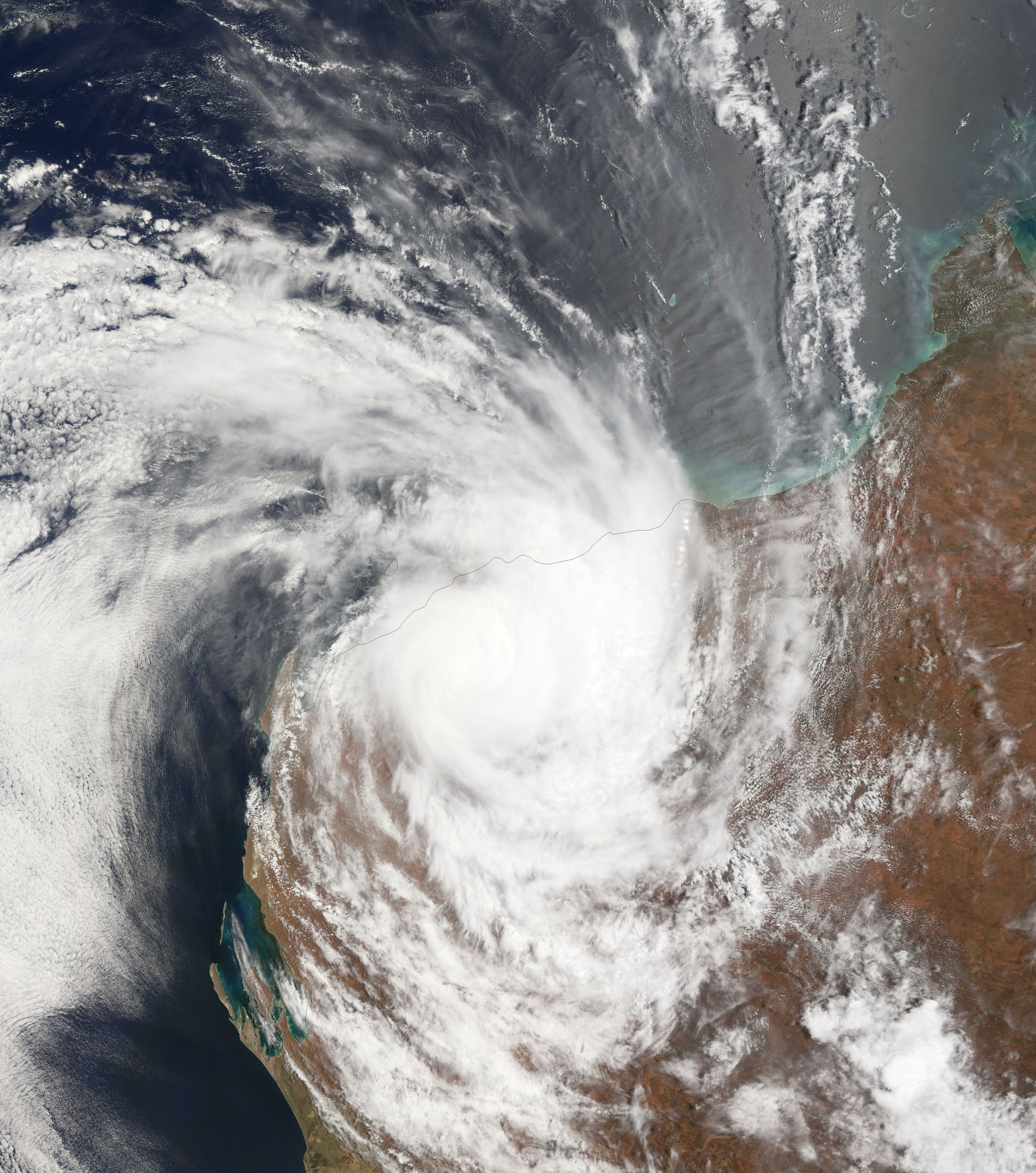
Satellite image of Cyclone Clare over Western Australia on 10 January

In advance of the storm's landfall, officials issued a "red alert" for several locations. Offshore, oil rigs were shut down and ports were closed. At least 2,000 residents were evacuated from their homes in potentially susceptible areas of the Karratha region. In areas between Broome and Port Hedland, people were urged to tidy debris and organise disaster supplies to prepare for the storm.

Upon moving ashore, the storm produced winds of 131 km/h (81 mph) at Legendre Island and a gust of 142 km/h (88 mph) at Karratha. Heavy precipitation—often exceeding 200 mm (7.9 in)—was recorded along the central Pilbara coast. Rainfall at Wickham totalled 215 mm (8.5 in), with 212 mm (8.3 in) at Karratha and more moderate amounts elsewhere. Since storm surge from the cyclone peaked during low tide, it was not severe and caused no known damage.

Clare produced extensive flooding that forced the closure of numerous roads, including part of the North West Coastal Highway. It also triggered torrential rains and flooding in southern areas of the country, including Gascoyne and the South-West Land Division. There, 224 mm (8.8 in) of rain fell in 24 hours. Additionally, the Greenough River surpassed its banks; a sandbagging effort prevented the resultant floods from inundating the town of Walkaway. The storm cut off power and left tens of thousands of residents without telephone service. Property damage was generally minor, and no casualties or significant injuries from the storm were reported. The name Clare was retired following its usage in 2006.

On 13 January 2006, the town of Lake Grace in the south of the state was flooded by Cyclone Clare, receiving 230 mm of rainfall. It was declared a disaster zone by the State Government.

== See also ==
- 2005–06 Australian region cyclone season
