= Mount Narryer Station =

Pastoral lease in Western Australia

Coordinates: 26.587°S 115.926°E

Location in Western Australia

Mount Narryer or Mount Narryer Station is a pastoral lease that operates as a cattle station and had previously operated as a sheep station.

== Description ==
It is located about 208 kilometres (129 mi) north of Yalgoo and 214 kilometres (133 mi) north east of Kalbarri in the Mid West region of Western Australia. Mount Narryer occupies an area of 198,873 hectares (491,426 acres) leasehold and 202 hectares (499 acres) freehold with a carrying capacity of 11,000 sheep. Situated along the Murchison River, the property is broken into 18 paddocks of mulga scrubland with one permanent spring, four dams and 40 bores equipped with windmills.

The station is named after Mount Narryer, a large rocky outcrop.

== Homestead ==
The current homestead is listed on the Register of the National Estate as an historic place. The buildings are not typical of the local area, with the architect designed elaborate house and impressive shearing shed both built from local stone. It was built when Charles Atkins, who also owned the Palace Hotel in Perth, owned the property.

The original homestead was built by Isaac Tyson near Mount Narryer itself. A second homestead was built in 1900 near the current house, and the ruins can still be seen from the present one.

== History ==
Mount Narryer Station was established about 1880. By 1897 Isaac Tyson was the owner and was growing a small plot of cotton near the homestead.

In 1909 the property had been acquired by the Aitkins brothers, who owned large tracts of land in the area. By 1925 the property occupied an area of approximately 500,000 acres (202,343 ha) and had an estimated carrying capacity of 25,000 sheep. The old stock had been eliminated at it was stocked with about 9,000 ewes.

The McTaggart family have owned the property and been running cattle since 1980, but placed the property on the market in 2014 after suffering through drought, the stress of feral goats, wild dogs and finding staff. The property was placed on the market in 2014 for A$1.5 million. The price included the five bedroom stone homestead, three bedroom cottage, three bedroom outcamp, five stand stone shearing shed, cattle yard, hangar, and shearers' quarters. A herd of approximately 200 droughtmaster cattle were included in the sale.

== See also ==
- List of ranches and stations
