= Byro Station =

Pastoral lease and sheep station in Western Australia

Coordinates: 26°4′40″S 116°9′7″E

Location in Western Australia

Byro Station is a pastoral lease and sheep station that also carries cattle, located in the Mid West region of Western Australia.

== Description ==
Situated approximately 260 kilometres (162 mi) north of Yalgoo and 229 kilometres (142 mi) north west of Cue, the property is approximately 1,000,000 acres (404,686 ha) in area. The Wooramel River runs across the plains at the western end of the station. The country is undulating and broken with belts of saltbush and grasses.

== History ==
The area was opened up in 1877 when stock were first introduced into the Upper Murchison. Mr J. R. O'Grady of Milly Milly Station and the prospector G. Woodley took stock to the area and explored the Wooramel River with O'Grady, who took up Byro Plains Station before later selling to the Nairn brothers.

Walter Nairn used to travel about the Murchison with his father, James Nairn. Together they selected Mount Jonbert Station, which was later renamed as Byro station around 1882. Walter settled in the area and remained there for 31 years before moving to Popanyinning.

Gold was discovered on Byro Plain in 1890, by a prospector name Fredred who found some "splendid" specimens.

James Nairn joined his father, Walter J. Nairn, and his brother Edward, at the station to help with its management while in his early 20s in 1897.

The Nairn brothers sold 1,500 sheep wethers and 150 bullocks from the station in 1908 to Mr. G. J. Gooch.

Edward Nairn was appointed as a justice of the peace of the Gascoyne magisterial district in 1911 while living at Byro.

By 1912, the station was expecting to shear 20,000 sheep using all eight stands in the shearing shed.

W. J. Nairn sold Byro to the Darlot brothers in 1913. The Darlots had previously owned Beringarra Station, which they had bought in 1881. The Darlot brothers had also acquired nearby Billabalong Station. The Darlots intended to make many improvements and use Byro for breeding and Billabalong as a depot.

Mr E. Roberts commenced as the station manager in 1913 and left nearly five years later in 1918 to take over at Dandaragan Station. His replacement was Mr. J. M. Keogh.

A bore was sunk at the station to secure a reliable sub-artesian supply of water for the stock in 1917. Water was struck at a depth of 1,250 feet (381 m) with water rising to 130 feet (40 m) of the surface. It delivered up to 600 US gallons (2,271 L) of water per hour.

The Darlots sold 500 cows and calves from the holding in 1918. In 1922 the Darlots bought and took delivery of 15,000 wethers from the Butchers of Meeberrie and Boolathana Stations. The flock were in prime condition and at the time this was considered the largest sale of wethers in the state from a breeder to a single buyer.

By 1925, Keogh was still running the property, which had held 28,000 sheep and 5,200 head of cattle in 1923. Following a drought in 1924 the majority of the stock had been moved south to the Darlots' other property of Urilla. At one point in 1925 only 5,000 sheep remained on Byro.

Everard Firebrace Darlot died in November 1937 leaving the surviving members of the firm, his brother Leonard Darlot and partner Norman D'Arcy, to retain ownership of the station.

The station continued to produce quality wool and sold 8 bales in 1941, 106 in 1945, 102 bales in 1946, 12 bales in 1948, 121 in 1949, and another 97 bales in 1950.

The lessee in 2010 was Revive Nominees Pty. Ltd.; Byro is operating under the Crown Lease number CL774-1966 and has the Land Act number LA3114/700.

== See also ==
- List of ranches and stations
- List of pastoral leases in Western Australia
