= Tibradden Station =

Pastoral lease in Western Australia

Coordinates: 28.752°S 114.904°E

Location in Western Australia

Tibradden or Tibradden Station is a pastoral lease that currently operates as a cattle station and had previously operated as a sheep station.

It is located about 26 kilometres (16 mi) north east of Greenough and 28 kilometres (17 mi) east of Geraldton in the Mid West region of Western Australia. The name Tibradden is taken from the name of an estate in Ireland near Dublin.

The property comprising 40,000 acres (16,187 ha) had been established in 1852 and was owned by John S. Davis, J. P. Walcott and M. Logue, who dissolved their partnership in 1854. The land was divided, with Davis' portion retaining the name of Tibradden and comprising approximately 25,000 acres (10,117 ha), Walcott naming his Miininooka, and Logue calling his Ellendale.

The property was running sheep in 1875 and was selling breeding ewes and rams.

== See also ==
- List of ranches and stations
