= Murgoo Station =

Pastoral lease in Western Australia

Coordinates: 27°21′42″S 116°25′41″E

Location in Western Australia

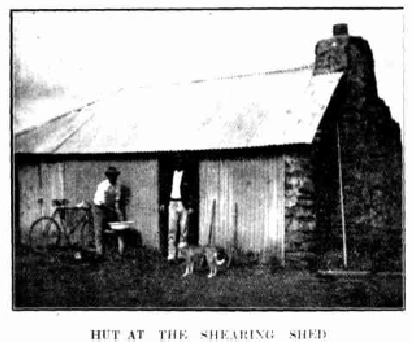
Murgoo hut near shearing shed, 1905

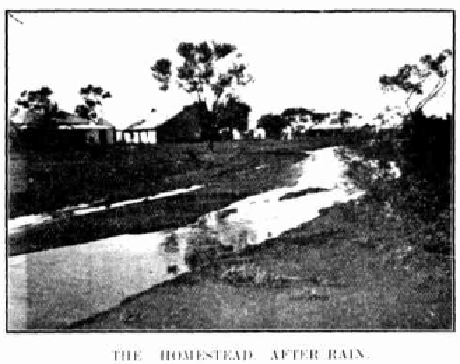
Murgoo Homestead, 1905

Murgoo Station is a pastoral lease and sheep station located in the Mid West region of Western Australia.

Situated approximately 112 kilometres (70 mi) to the north of Yalgoo and 146 kilometres (91 mi) to the west of Cue, the station has an area of 402,960 acres (163,072 ha) and consists of saltbush plains and mulga country, with an elevation of approximately 800 feet (244 m) above sea level.

The station was established in 1873 by Edward and Frank Wittenoom and possibly owned for a time in 1875 by the Mungarra Squatting Company, which was run by A. Brown and J. H. Monger.

In 1880 the Wittenooms established the homestead at the current site. In 1891 the Wittenooms sold the property to Richard Holmes and H. Maloney. Holmes later sold his share to Maloney who ran the station until his death in 1903.

The station was on the market in 1905 and had a flock of 19,000 sheep, 500 cattle and 55 horses. There were many shallow wells and 23 windmills. Divided into 15 large sheep paddocks, one large cattle paddock and ten smaller paddocks for horses or other stock, the station was sold later that same year to agents of Charles Atkins for the sum of £23,200.

The Atkins imported Merino rams to the station from Victoria in 1908.

In 1918, the Atkins sold off 298 rams from the property.

From 1919 the station was being managed by R. W. Fremlin, who steadily improved the property's situation. The property contained between 60 and 70 windmills by 1928 and had 423 miles (681 km) of five and six strand fencing erected. Fremlin retired from managing Murgoo and other Atkins Brothers holdings, including Mount Narryer and Tibradden Station, in the 1930s and moved to Mullewa where he died in 1954, aged 80. The combined properties run by Fremlin ran over 40,000 sheep and routinely produced 1200–1400 bales of wool per year.

During the 1920s the station would often transport sheep to Derby for export by truck; the 230 miles (370 km) journey would take two days.

20,000 sheep were shorn in 1920, increasing to 28,000 in 1922 then following a drought only 23,000 in 1924. In 1924 the Atkins also sold 5,000 wethers to Mr. McKenna of Carlaminda station at 42s. per head. This was a record sale at the time.

By 1926 over 31,000 sheep were clipped and in 1927 the station shore 32,000 producing over 900 bales of wool. In 1928 the station was owned still by the Aitken Brothers, who were originally from South Australia. The station also sold off 21,000 sheep from both Murgoo and the adjoining Mt. Narryer station, which was also owned by the brothers.

The current lessee is Reginald Seaman, Murgoo is operating under the Crown Lease number CL573-1966 and has the Land Act number LA3114/578. The Seaman family have been on the property since 1974 and in 2010 had to take the drastic step of destocking the property as a result of severe drought. Murgoo had below average winter rainfall between 2000 and 2010, receiving only 68 millimetres (3 in) of rain in 2010.

== Races ==
In 1915, Charles Atkins decided to hold a race meeting in the area to "liven things up a bit". The first race was held in 1917 at Manfred Station, approximately 75 miles from Murgoo, which at the time was owned by Frank and Edward Wittenoom. Races were held at Manfred until 1920 when the Murgoo Picnic Race Club was formed in 1920.

A race track was made and Atkins made use of the shearing shed as a clubroom and for the race ball. In the early days women were only allowed in the clubroom when invited by a member and always received champagne as a refreshment.

Two day meets were held from 1920 to 1929 and then halted over the course of the Great Depression and a couple of years of drought before resuming in 1935. During World War II the Murchison Patriotic Funds Committee took over and ran the race biannually, and normal race meets resumed again in 1947.

No meetings were held in the drought years of 1950, 1951, 1955 and 1956, but were run regularly since until at least 1963. No bookmakers were allowed on the course and all jockeys were station hands and overseers.

== See also ==
- List of ranches and stations
