= William Burges (politician) =

Australian politician

The Honourable William Burges JP
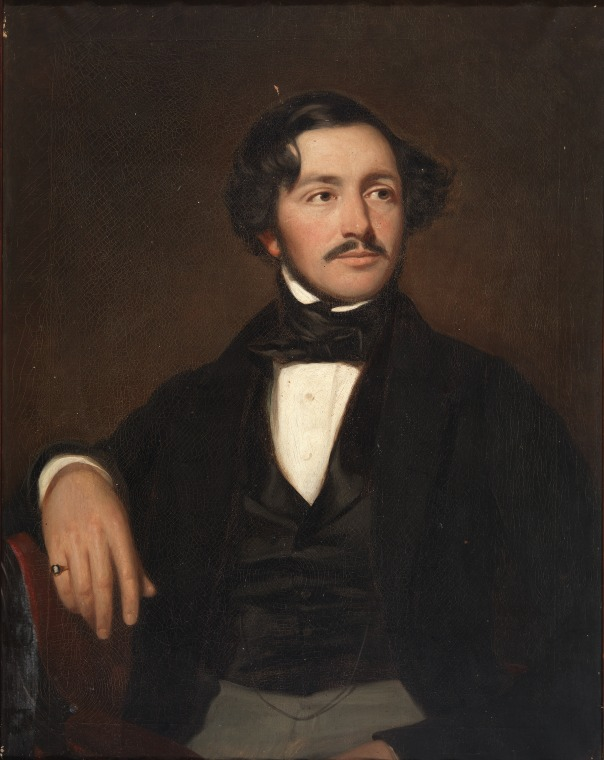

Member of the Western Australian Legislative Council
- In office 24 November 1875 – 25 July 1876

Personal details
- Born: 1806 Fethard, County Tipperary, Ireland
- Died: 16 October 1876 (aged 69–70) Fethard, County Tipperary
- Citizenship: British subject
- Relatives: Lockier Snr. (brother); Thomas (nephew); Lockier Jnr. (nephew); Richard Goldsmith (nephew)
- Occupation: Politician; Pastoralist; Settler

William Burges (1806 or 1808 – 16 October 1876) was an early settler in Western Australia who became a pastoralist and a Member of the Western Australian Legislative Council.

Born in Fethard, County Tipperary, Ireland in 1806 or 1808, William Burges was a brother of John Major Burges (c. 1805–?), Samuel Burges (1810–1885) and Lockier Clere Burges (senior) (1814–1886). William was also an uncle of Thomas Burges, Richard Goldsmith Burges and Lockier Clere Burges (junior) (1841–1929).

In 1830, William Burges and his brothers Samuel and Lockier emigrated to Western Australia on board the Warrior. Until 1837 they farmed together in the Upper Swan district. In 1837 the brothers obtained land at York. They named their homestead Tipperary.

Burges travelled to Ireland in 1841, and returned to York in 1844. In 1846 he was appointed a justice of the peace. Appointed secretary of the York Agricultural Society in 1847, he was closely involved in that body's ultimately successful petition for Western Australia to become a penal colony. In 1850, he moved to the Champion Bay district, establishing the Bowes homestead. From 1851 to 1860 he was resident magistrate for his district, and in 1853 he was sub-collector of customs and visiting magistrate for the convict depot at Port Gregory. He returned to Ireland in 1860, but revisited Western Australia in 1868 and 1875. In November 1875, he was nominated to the Legislative Council. He held the seat until his resignation in July 1876. He returned to Ireland shortly afterwards, dying at Fethard on 16 October. He was unmarried.
