= Mileura Station =

Pastoral lease in Western Australia

Coordinates: 26°22′24.83″S 117°19′58.79″E

Location in Western Australia

Mileura Station is a pastoral lease located in the Mid West region of Western Australia.

== Description ==
The station occupies an area of approximately 620,000 acres (250,000 ha) and is situated approximately 100 kilometres (62 mi) west of Meekatharra. The property adjoins Nookawarra Station.

The station has expanses of mulga, limestone gibber, rocky outcrops, floodplains and river and creek systems.

== History ==
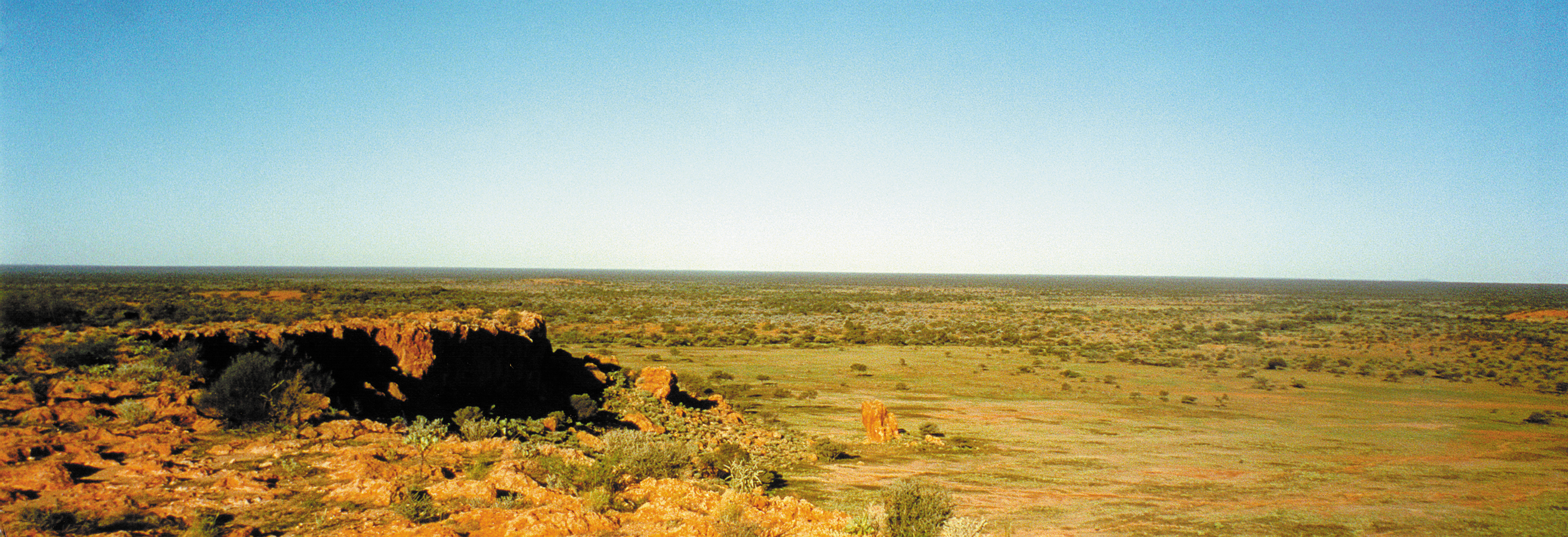
Landscape at Mileura Station

Mileura Station was established in 1885 by Victorians Henry (Harry) Bowring Walsh (1856-1920) and his younger brother, Frederick Richard Walsh (1861-1938). With financial assistance from their father, Frederick Walsh (1831-1905) of Hawthorn, Victoria the brothers purchased about half (700,000 acres) of Nookawarra Station from the then owner, explorer Frank Wittenoom. The purchase price of ten thousand pounds included 7,000 sheep and 500 head of cattle. The brothers called their new station "Mileura" - the name of the hill from which Wittenoom had surveyed the country in 1875. A stone homestead was erected in 1890; other infrastructure, such as fences, permanent watering points and an eight-stand shearing shed soon followed. The station was held by various members of the brothers' families until 1947, when Godfrey Henry (Bill) Walsh, Frederick Richard Walsh's eldest son, became the sole owner. Bill Walsh died prematurely and the station became the property of his wife, Margery Walsh, in 1949. Her son Matcham Walsh took over the management of the station in 1956, becoming sole owner in 1967. At its peak Mileura ran 18,000 Merino sheep and 500 shorthorn cattle. The station was sold in 2004 to Cynthia and Gregory Stoney, who sold all the sheep in favour of increased cattle numbers. They sold it in 2013 to Michael and Anna Tierney.

== Science ==
During Matcham Walsh's era (1956-2004) Mileura was the site of widespread and on-going scientific research into the ecosystem of the mulga rangeland. This was led by Dr Stephen Davies, head of CSIRO Wildlife Research in Western Australia 1969-1983 and an associate professor of Environmental Biology at Curtin University from 1989. Other scientists to lead research based at Mileura included Professor John Valley of the University of Wisconsin–Madison and Professor Simon Wilde of Curtin University, who with their teams located and dated the 4.4 billion year old zircons that showed that life might have existed on Earth as much as 800 million years before the oldest known micro-fossil. In 1999 Mileura was selected as a potential site for the international Square Kilometre Array radio-telescope - the largest such project ever undertaken. Extensive radio tests were carried out at Mileura in the years 2000-2005 but in 2006, due to compromised radio quietness in the Mileura area, it was decided to move the site south-west to Boolardy Station.

== Aboriginal occupation ==
In the 1950s Stephen Davies and Matcham Walsh arranged radio carbon-dating of a hearth in a cave in the Ejah Breakaway, about 18 km south/west of the homestead. It placed occupation there as far back as 1100 CE. It seems likely that the cave, well positioned near a water hole and having a panoramic view over the surrounding plains, was once an Aboriginal resting place, or perhaps a ceremonial site. Scratch markings on the ceiling of the cave could be construed as maps of the area. As of 2017 Mileura falls within the Wadjarri Yamatji native title area.

== See also ==
- List of ranches and stations
