= Beringarra Station =

Pastoral lease in Western Australia

Coordinates: 26.041°S 116.954°E

Location in Western Australia

Beringarra Station, most commonly referred to as Beringarra, is a pastoral lease that once operated as a sheep station but is currently operating as a cattle station in Western Australia.

The property is situated approximately 166 kilometres (103 mi) north west of Meekatharra and 322 kilometres (200 mi) south of Paraburdoo in the Mid West region. It is watered by the northern branch Murchison River and is bounded to the west by Milly Milly Station, and to the south by Bindebaron Station. The property is mostly composed of grassland and saltbush country on flood out plains of the river with many permanent water holes.

The station currently occupies an area of 140,322 hectares (346,743 acres) of which 9,143 hectares (22,593 acres) is freehold, reserves or vacant crown land. The land within the property is described as having nil erosion on 72% of the property and 50% of the perennial vegetation described as good to fair. The carrying capacity is estimated at 7,290 sheep although the station has carried up to 11,290 sheep.

Beringarra was initially selected by John Forrest and William Butcher. Butcher brought sheep to Beringarra and then sold to Messrs Campbell and Smith. In 1880 Beringarra was acquired by Henry and John Campbell who, after having troubles with the local Aboriginal people, sold the 390,000-acre (157,827 ha) property stocked with 9,000 sheep, 12 cattle and horses and equipped with a shearing shed and wool press to H. Darlot of Melbourne in 1882. In 1886 the property occupied an area of 400,000 acres (161,874 ha).

Following a bad season in 1906, Beringarra was advertised to be auctioned in 1907 by Darlot. At this time the property had grown to 663,000 acres (268,307 ha) of leasehold with 1,000 acres (405 ha) of freehold. It was stocked with 12,500 mixed sheep, 2,000 mixed cattle and 70 horses. The main homestead boasted six bedrooms, storerooms, kitchen, workers cottages, blacksmith shop, 20-stand shearing shed and stables. The outstation had another six bedroom house. The property had 350 miles (563 km) of fencing in place and 27 wells mostly with windmills and reservoirs in place. It was passed in after reaching £19,000. The station was acquired by the New Zealand and Australian Land Company Limited at some time prior to 1912.

The manager from 1910 to 1914 was Mr. Rymer, who recorded the rainfall at the property from 1910 to 1914. In 1910 the property received 10 inches (254 mm), 3.15 inches (80 mm) in 1911, 4.47 inches (114 mm) in 1912 and 7.19 inches (183 mm) in 1913 with another 2.2 inches (56 mm) recorded in the first six months of 1914.

The area was struck by drought through 1912 resulting in shearing at Beringarra being cancelled and starving sheep being trucked south from Cue. Rains came in 1913 and the station took delivery of 5,000 sheep from the eastern states, including 300 rams. A total of 15,000 sheep were to be shorn the same year. The wool clip for 1914 was 316 bales of greasy wool and 16 bales of scoured wool. The property was carrying 17,000 sheep and occupied an area of 800,000 acres (323,749 ha).

In 1918 some 51,000 sheep were shorn, followed by 22,000 in 1919 then 11,000 in 1920 and only 9,000 in 1921. The 1921 season produced 225 bales of wool, which was regarded as satisfactory given that the sheep were on a starvation diet for part of the time and 60% of the lambs perished in drought conditions.

During shearing in 1927 a total of 47,634 sheep were shorn, including 11,400 lambs, producing 901 bales of wool.

The area was struck by drought in 2010 so that Simon Broad, the manager of the Milly Milly Pastoral company, which also own Beringarra, had to separate calves from their mothers to keep them alive. The calves were penned near the homestead and fed milk replacement tablets.

== See also ==
- List of ranches and stations
