= Acacia citrinoviridis =

River jam

Conservation status
- Least Concern (IUCN 3.1)

Scientific classification
- Kingdom: Plantae
- Clade: Tracheophytes
- Clade: Angiosperms
- Clade: Eudicots
- Clade: Rosids
- Order: Fabales
- Family: Fabaceae
- Subfamily: Caesalpinioideae
- Clade: Mimosoid clade
- Genus: Acacia
- Species: A. citrinoviridis

Binomial name
- Acacia citrinoviridis Tindale & Maslin
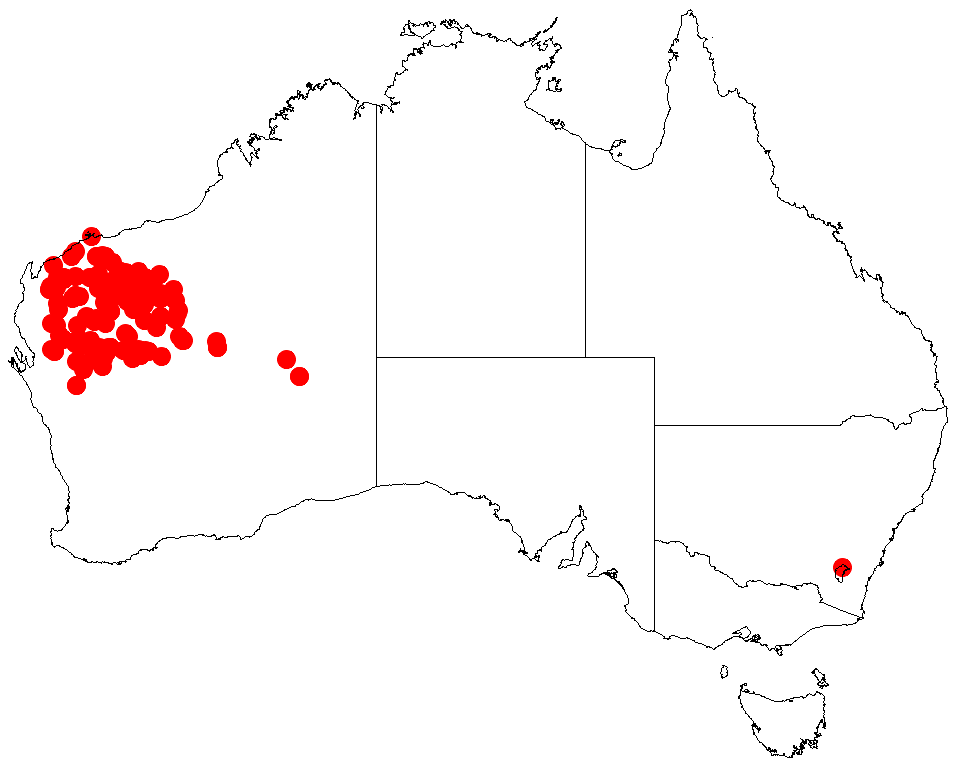
- Occurrence data from AVH

Species of legume

Acacia citrinoviridis, commonly known as river jam, milhan or wantan, is a species of flowering plant in the family Fabaceae and is endemic to north-western Western Australia. It is a graceful tree with fissured grey bark, shiny reddish brown branchlets, narrowly elliptic, leathery phyllodes, spikes of bright yellow flowers, and narrowly oblong pods with citron green or silvery white hairs.

== Description ==
Acacia citrinoviridis is a graceful tree that typically grows to a height of 5–15 m (16–49 ft) and has a silvery green, greyish green or blue-grey crown. It usually has a single trunk with fissured, grey bark on the trunk and larger branches. Its phyllodes are narrowly elliptic, mostly 60–120 mm (2.4–4.7 in) long, 7–13 mm (0.28–0.51 in) wide and leathery with a central vein, and densely covered with silky hairs at first. The flowers are bright yellow and borne in spikes 8–32 mm (0.31–1.26 in) long on a peduncle 1–7 mm (0.039–0.276 in) long. Flowering occurs from February to August with the main flush in April and May, and the pods are narrowly oblong, 20–120 mm (0.79–4.72 in) long, 10–15 mm (0.39–0.59 in) wide, thinly leathery to crust-like and velvety or covered with silky citron-green or silvery white hairs. The seeds are black or dark brown, broadly elliptic to almost spherical, 5–6.5 mm (0.20–0.26 in) in diameter.

== Taxonomy ==
Acacia citrinoviridis was first formally described in 1976 by Mary Tindale and Bruce Maslin in the journal Nuytsia from specimens collected by Maslin near the Fortescue River crossing, east of the Millstream homestead in 1972. The specific epithet (citrinoviridis) refers to the citron-green hairs on the young shoots and pods of this species.

== Distribution and habitat ==
This species of wattle usually grows near creeks and rivers with sandy, rocky beds but also in stony soil away from watercourses. It is found from near Shark Bay to the Fortescue River, west to Nanutarra, and west of a line between Marble Bar and Wiluna in the Carnarvon, Gascoyne, Little Sandy Desert, Murchison and Carnarvon, Gascoyne, Little Sandy Desert, Murchison and Pilbara bioregions of Western Australia.

== Conservation status ==
Acacia citrinoviridis is listed as "not threatened" by the Government of Western Australia Department of Biodiversity, Conservation and Attractions. The IUCN lists it as Least Concern.

== See also ==
- List of Acacia species
