= Lockier Burges (politician) =

Australian politician

Two people named Lockier Clere Burges have been prominent in Western Australia. For the Lockier Clere Burges born in 1841, see Lockier Burges (entrepreneur)

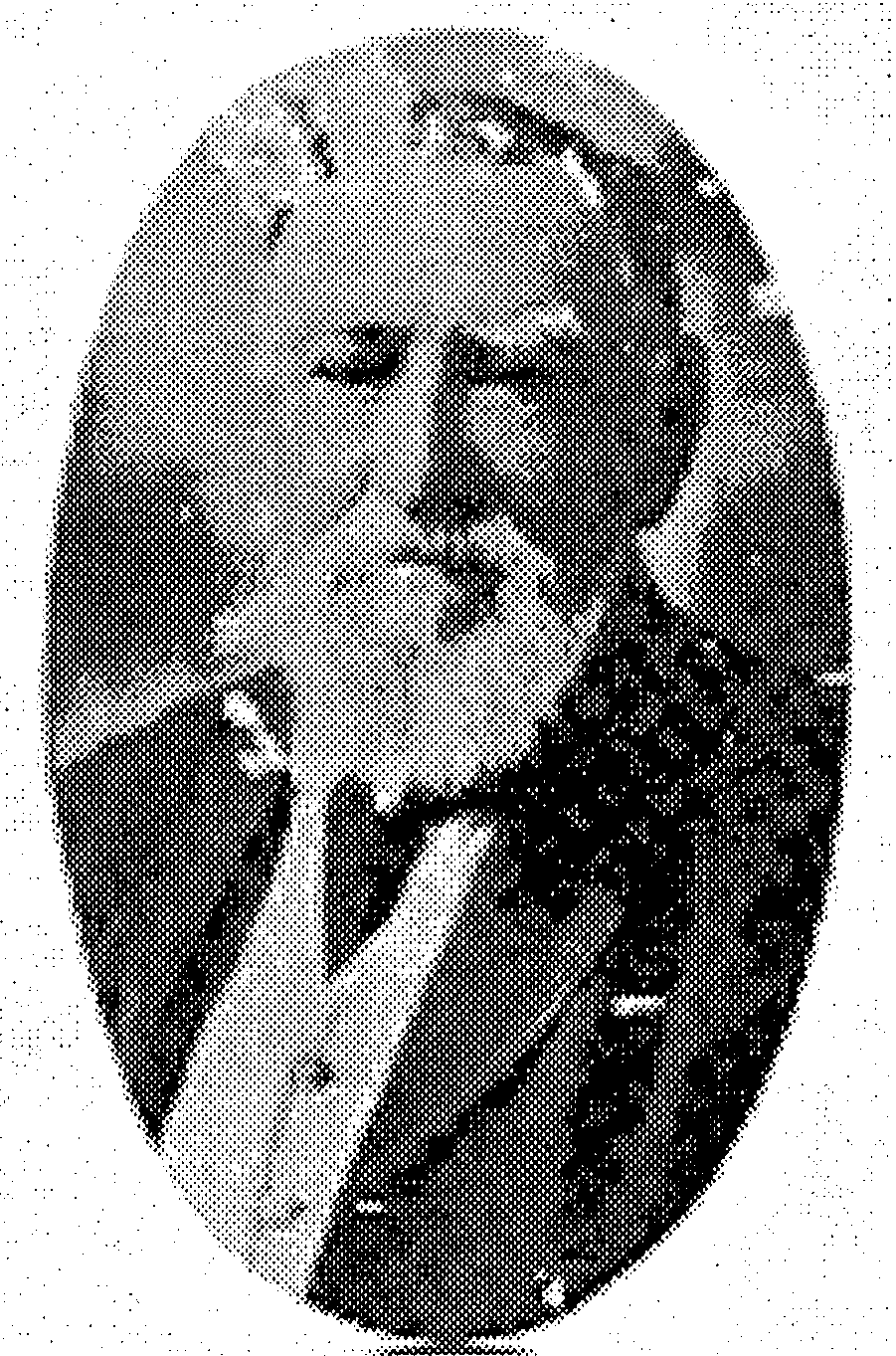
Lockier Clere Burges Senior

Lockier Clere Burges (c. 1814–31 July 1886) was an early settler in colonial Western Australia who became a leading pastoralist in the colony, and a Member of the Western Australian Legislative Council.

Lockier Burges was born at Fethard, County Tipperary, Ireland around 1814. In 1829, he emigrated to Western Australia with his two brothers William Burges and Samuel Evans Burges. The three brothers sailed for the Swan River Colony on board the Warrior, arriving in March 1830. The brothers settled on 300 acres (120 ha) of virgin land at the junction of Ellen Brook and the Swan River at Upper Swan until 1837, before taking up 5,600 acres (2,300 ha) of land at York. They named their new selection Tipperary in honour of their birthplace. In 1849, Lockier and William Burges moved to the Champion Bay area, leaving Samuel at Tipperary. Initially Lockier was Superintendent of the Geraldine lead mine. In 1851 Lockier Burges selected the homestead site for Irwin House on the Irwin River about 18 kilometres (11 mi) inland from the modern site of Dongara. Burges, in partnership with Edward Hamersley, Samuel Pole Phillips and Bartholomew Urban Vigors, making up the pastoral group called The Cattle Company, were granted grazing leases over 60,000 acres (24,000 ha) of land along the Irwin River and Greenough Flats, securing for the company a virtual monopoly of land in the area.

In January 1860 Burges visited Ireland, returning to Western Australia in November 1862, accompanied by his nephew Lockier Burges junior.

Burges is noted in ornithology for specimens of birds obtained at York, supplied to John Gilbert and recorded by John Gould in Birds of Australia. Amongst the poorly known species he provided was one of the pied honeyeater Certhionyx variegatus and the type specimen of the grey falcon Falco hypoleucos.

On 14 January 1879, Lockier Burges was nominated to the Western Australian Legislative Council. He held the position until 2 July 1884. In his final years he retired to Perth, where he died, unmarried, on 31 July 1886.
