= List of State Register of Heritage Places in the Shire of Carnarvon =

The State Register of Heritage Places is maintained by the Heritage Council of Western Australia. As of 2026, 111 places are heritage-listed in the Shire of Carnarvon, of which 13 are on the State Register of Heritage Places.

== List ==
The Western Australian State Register of Heritage Places, as of 2026, lists the following 13 state registered places within the Shire of Carnarvon:

Place name	Place #	Location	Suburb or town	Co-ordinates	Built	State registered	Notes	Photo
St George's Anglican Church	460	10 Francis Street	Carnarvon	24.885144°S 113.657353°E	1907	15 October 1999	Also referred to as St George’s Church of England	
St Mary's Star of the Sea Church	461	21 Johnston Street	Carnarvon	24.885901°S 113.658104°E	1910	17 February 2006	Also referred to as Church of St Mary Star of the Sea Group and Church of St Mary’s	
Babbage Island Lighthouse	462	Annear Place, Babbage Island	Carnarvon	24.875941°S 113.630913°E	1897	24 March 2000	Also referred to as Carnarvon Lighthouse and Lighthouse Keeper's Cottage Museum	
Site of the Gascoyne River Bridge	463		Carnarvon	24.827155°S 113.768910°E	1931	15 August 2003	Also referred to as 10 Mile Bridge, Gascoyne River Bridge and MRWA 838 North West Coastal Highway; Demolished in 2002	
ANZ Bank Building	465	16 Robinson Street	Carnarvon	24.884498°S 113.656928°E	1905	24 March 2000	Also referred to as Union Bank of Australia Ltd Building	
One Mile Jetty	467	Babbage Island	Carnarvon	24.880606°S 113.617145°E	1904		Also referred to as Carnarvon Jetty, Mile Long Jetty and Stock Jetty; Part of the One Mile Jetty and Tramway Precinct (4566)	
Homeswest Building	468	30 Robinson Street	Carnarvon	24.883855°S 113.657462°E	1929	7 January 2000	Also referred to as Bank of New South Wales (NSW) and Main Roads Office	
Overseas Telecommunications Satellite Earth Station	472	Mahony Avenue Brown Range	Brown Range	24.869086°S 113.705155°E	1964	4 May 2001	Also referred to as OTC Earth Station, OTC Telecommunications Station, Overseas Telecommunications Station and The Dish	
One Mile Jetty and Tramway	4566		Carnarvon	24.880606°S 113.617145°E	1898	7 February 1997		
Babbage Island Causeway Bridge	4590	Babbage Island Road	Carnarvon	24.884443°S 113.651932°E				
Gascoyne Research Station	6839	South River Road corner Research Road	Carnarvon	24.852293°S 113.729840°E	1940	20 April 2007	Also referred to as Carnarvon Research Station	
Babbage Island Lighthouse	25484	Annear Place, Babbage Island	Carnarvon	24.875941°S 113.630913°E			Part of Babbage Island Lighthouse precinct (462)	
Tramway Bridge and Tramway	26316	off Olivia Terrace	Carnarvon	24.867222°S 113.661111°E			Also referred to as Babbage Island Causeway Bridge and Town Bridge; Part of the One Mile Jetty and Tramway Precinct (4566)	

== Former places ==
The following place has been removed from the State Register of Heritage Places within the Shire of Carnarvon:

Place name	Place #	Location	Suburb or town	Co-ordinates	Built	State registered	Deregistered	Notes	Photo
Carnarvon Pioneer Cemetery	4598	Richardson Street	South Carnarvon	24.893054°S 113.659956°E	1880	2 September 1998	1 July 2021	Also referred to as Carnarvon Cemetery and South Carnarvon Cemetery	
