= Whitlock Island (Carnarvon) =

Island of Western Australia

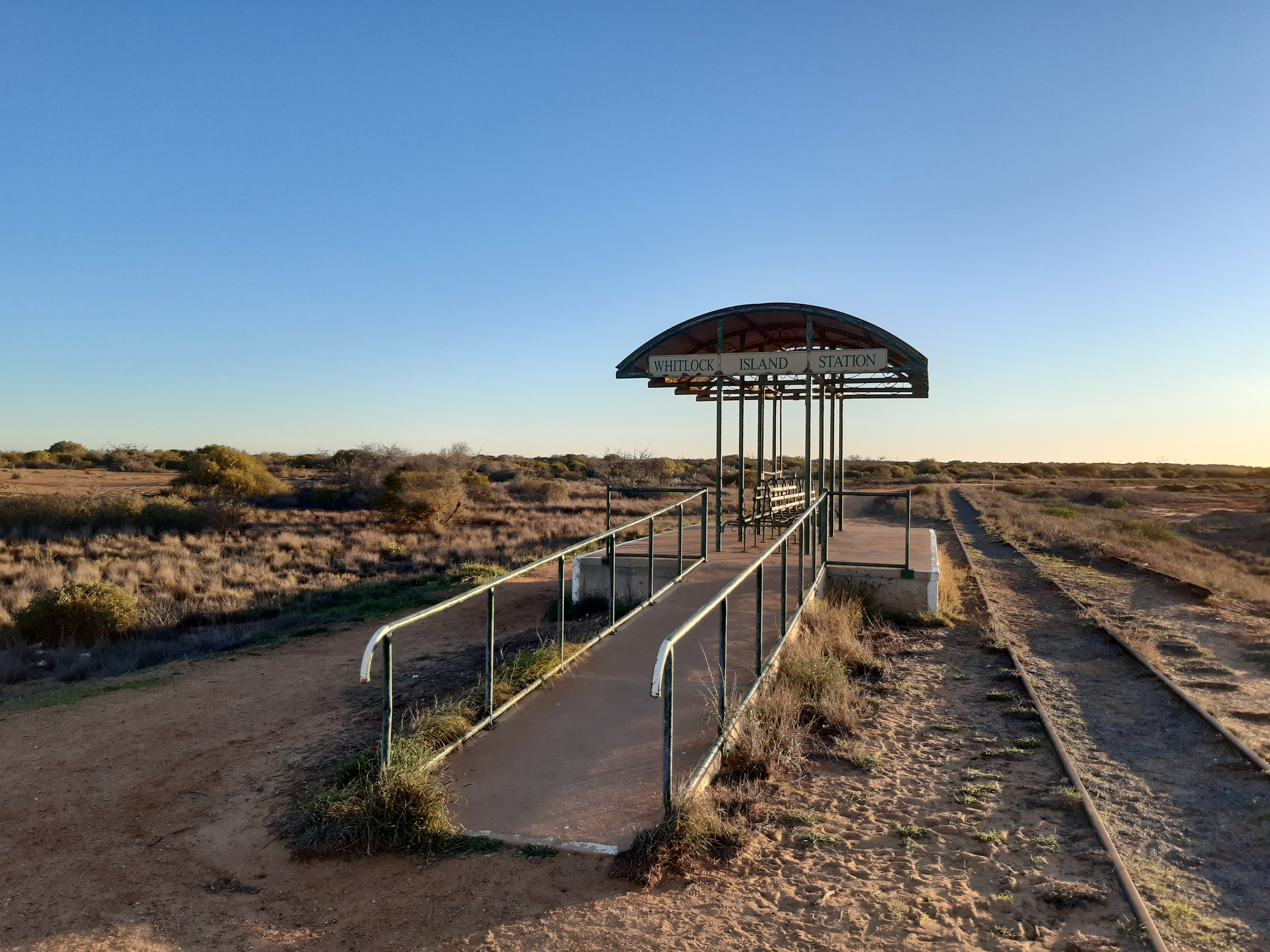
- Whitlock Island Station, part of the Carnarvon Tramway

- Location within Western Australia

Geography
- Location: Indian Ocean
- Coordinates: 24°53′10″S 113°38′50″E

Administration
- Australia
- State: Western Australia
- LGA: Shire of Carnarvon

Whitlock Island is an island near Carnarvon, Western Australia. It was named after Frank Whitlock who was a mayor of Carnarvon between 1908 and 1915.

The island is part of the Gascoyne River delta.

The island was a stop-over point of the Carnarvon tramway which ran from Carnarvon to the Carnarvon's One Mile Jetty on Babbage Island.
