= One Mile =

One Mile may refer to:

- The mile run
- One Mile Jetty, Western Australia
- One Mile, New South Wales
- One Mile, Queensland
