= Decolonisation of Asia =

Independence of Asian countries, 1662–2002

The decolonisation of Asia was the gradual growth of independence movements in Asia, concluding with the independence of the Democratic Republic of Timor-Leste from Indonesia in 2002. It led ultimately to the retreat of foreign powers and the creation of several nation-states in the region.

== Background ==
The decline of Spain and Portugal in the 17th century paved the way for other European powers, namely the Netherlands, France and England. The Portuguese Empire would lose influence in all but three of its colonies, Portuguese India, Macau and Timor.

By the end of the 17th century, the Dutch had taken over much of the old Portuguese colonies, and had established a strong presence in present-day Indonesia, with colonies in Aceh, Bantam, Makassar and Jakarta. The Dutch also had trade links with Siam, Japan, China and Bengal.

The British had competed with Portuguese, Spanish and Dutch for their interests in Asia since the early 17th century and by the mid-19th century held much of India (via the British East India Company), as well as Burma, Ceylon, Malaya and Singapore. After The Indian Rebellion of 1857, Queen Victoria was declared Empress of India, thus solidifying the British rule on the subcontinent. The last British acquisition in Asia was the New Territories of Hong Kong, which was leased from the Qing emperor in 1897, expanding the British colony originally ceded in the Treaty of Nanking in 1842.

The French had little success in India following defeats against the British in the 17th century, though they held onto possessions on the east coast of India (such as Pondicherry and Mahar) until decolonisation. The French established their most lucrative and substantial colony in Indochina in 1862 (→ French Indochina), eventually occupying the present-day areas of Vietnam, Laos and Cambodia by 1887.

Japan's first colony was the island of Taiwan, occupied in 1874 and officially ceded by the Qing emperor in 1894. Japan continued its early imperialism with the annexation of Korea in 1910.

The United States entered the region in 1898 during the Spanish–American War, taking the Philippines as its sole colony after a mock battle in the capital and the later formal acquisition of the Philippines from Spain through the 1898 Treaty of Paris.

== Asian colonies from the 17th century to the end of World War II ==
The following list shows the colonial powers following the end of World War II in 1945, their colonial or administrative possessions and the date of decolonisation.

- ///China:
  - Tibet (1912)
  - Jiangxi Soviet (1931)
  - Fujian (1933)
  - Mongolia (1924/1946)
  - China (1949)
- France:
  - Empire of Vietnam (1945)
  - (North Vietnam) Democratic Republic of Vietnam (1945/1954)
  - State of Vietnam (1949/1954)
  - (South Vietnam) Republic of Vietnam (1955)
  - Kingdom of Cambodia (1953)
  - Kingdom of Laos (1953)
  - Lebanon (1946)
  - Syria (1946)
  - French India (1954)
- Indonesia
  - East Timor (1999/2002)
- Japan:
  - Manchuria (Manchukuo), Northern China (1945/1946)
  - Second Philippine Republic (1945/1946)
  - Burma (1945/1948)
  - North Korea (1945/1948)
  - South Korea (1945/1948)
  - Taiwan and Penghu (1945/1952)
- Malaysia
  - Singapore (1965)
- Netherlands:
  - Dutch Formosa (1662/1668)
  - Dutch Malacca (1795/1825)
  - Indonesia (1945/1949)
  - Dutch New Guinea (1962)
- Pakistan:
  - Bangladesh (1971)
- Portugal:
  - Portuguese India (1961)
  - East Timor (1975/2002)
  - Macau (1999)
- Soviet Union (Russian Empire prior to 1917/1922)
  - Mongolia (1924)
  - Manchuria (Manchukuo), Northern China (1946)
  - North Korea (1948)
  - Kyrgyzstan (1991)
  - Uzbekistan (1991)
  - Tajikistan (1991)
  - Turkmenistan (1991)
  - Kazakhstan (1991)
- Spain:
  - Spanish Formosa (1642)
  - Revolutionary Government of the Philippines (1898)
- Turkey
  - Kingdom of Yemen (later became the North Yemen in 1962) (1918)
- United Kingdom:
  - Afghanistan (1919)
  - Bangladesh (1947) (1971)
  - Egypt (1922)
  - Nepal (1923)
  - Iraq (1932)
  - Jordan (1946)
  - Pakistan (1947)
  - India (1947)
  - Burma (1948)
  - Ceylon (1948)
  - Israel (1948)
  - Malaya (1957)
  - Cyprus (1960)
  - Kuwait (1961)
  - Sabah (North Borneo) (1963)
  - Sarawak (1963)
  - Maldives (1965)
  - Singapore (1965)
  - South Yemen (1967)
  - Oman (1970)
  - Bahrain (1971)
  - Qatar (1971)
  - United Arab Emirates (1971)
  - Brunei (1984)
  - Hong Kong (1997)
- United States:
  - Philippines (1946)
  - South Korea (1948)
  - Japan (1952)
  - Bonin Islands (1968)
  - Okinawa (1972)
  - Marshall Islands (1986)
  - Federated States of Micronesia (1986)
  - Palau (1994)

== Individual countries ==
Country	Date of acquisition of sovereignty	Acquisition of sovereignty
(Islamic Republic of Afghanistan) / Afghanistan	1919	Treaty of Rawalpindi ends British control of foreign policy
Bahrain	15 August 1971	End of treaties with the United Kingdom
Bangladesh	26 March 1971	Independence from Pakistan declared
Bhutan	1885	Ugyen Wangchuck ends a period of civil war and unites Bhutan
Brunei	1 January 1984	Brunei regains its independence after an agreement with the British on 4 January 1979
Cambodia	9 September 1953	France grants Cambodia independence
Cambodia	26 September 1989	Becomes free from Vietnamese occupation; it gets back its name instead of the People's Republic of Kampuchea
Taiwan	1 January 1912	On the first day of January 1912 The Republic of China unilaterally declared their independence.
China	7 December 1949	On the 1st of October 1949 the Chinese Communist Party wins against the Kuomintang which then retreats to the island of Taiwan.
India	15 August 1947	Independence from the British Empire
Indonesia	27 December 1949	Independence from the Kingdom of the Netherlands following their unilateral Proclamation of Indonesian Independence on 17 August 1945 and subsequent Dutch–Indonesian Round Table Conference in The Hague.
Iran	609 BC	After the fall of Assyria between 616 BC and 609 BC, a unified Median state was formed, which together with Babylonia, Lydia, and ancient Egypt became one of the four major powers of the ancient Near East.
Iraq	762	The Abbasid Caliphate built the city of Baghdad along the Tigris in the 8th century as its capital, and the city became the leading metropolis of the Arab and Muslim world for five centuries
Iraq	3 October 1932	Kingdom of Iraq
Israel	14 May 1948	Upon the end of the British Mandate, Jews declared independence, forming the State of Israel; the remainder of Palestine came under control of Egypt (Gaza Strip) and Transjordan (West Bank)
Japan	4th century CE	During the subsequent Kofun period, most of Japan gradually unified under a single kingdom
Jordan	25 May 1946	End of the British Mandate
Kuwait	1752	Establishment of the Sheikhdom of Kuwait
Kyrgyzstan	31 August 1991	Independence from the Soviet Union
Laos	22 October 1953	Independence from France
Lebanon	26 November 1941	Independence from France declared
Lebanon	22 November 1943	Independence from France recognised
Malaysia	31 August 1957	Malayan independence from the United Kingdom was declared in Dataran Merdeka (Independence Square)
Malaysia	16 September 1963	Malaysia was formed by the federation of North Borneo, Sarawak and Singapore with the existing States of the Federation of Malaya.
Maldives	26 July 1965	Independence from the United Kingdom
Mongolia	1206	Mongol Empire formed
Mongolia	29 December 1911	Proclamation of Mongolian independence from Manchu's Qing dynasty
Myanmar	4 January 1948	Myanmar (Burma) declares independence from the British Empire
Nepal	25 September 1768	Nepali unification
Oman	26 January 1650	Expulsion of the Portuguese Army from Oman
Pakistan	14 August 1947	Independence from British India in the Partition
Palestine	15 November 1988	Palestinian Declaration of Independence
Philippines	12 June 1898	The evolving revolutionary movement in Philippine revolutionaries declared independence from the Spanish Empire but sovereignty remained with Spain, which ceded the country to the United States.
Philippines	4 July 1946	The United States recognises independence under the provisions of the Treaty of Manila (1946). The 1935 Constitution remained in effect until 1973, when the Marcos regime promulgated a newer one, replaced in turn by the present 1987 Constitution.
Qatar	18 December 1878	Independence from the Ottoman Empire
Saudi Arabia	1744	Establishment of the First Saudi State
Singapore	3 June 1959	Self-government under the United Kingdom
Singapore	9 August 1965	Malaysia unilaterally expels Singapore from the federation of Malaysian states, creating an independent Singaporean state
Sri Lanka	4 February 1948	Independence from the United Kingdom
Syria	17 April 1946	End of the French Mandate
Syria	28 September 1961	End of the United Arab Republic
Tajikistan	9 September 1991	Independence from the Soviet Union
Thailand	6 November 1767	King Taksin the Great reunifies Thailand, establishing a new kingdom and repelling Burmese invasions
Timor-Leste	28 November 1975	East Timor declares its independence but was occupied by Indonesia
Timor-Leste	20 May 2002	Independence was recognised by the international community following the UN-sponsored act of self-determination of 1999
Turkmenistan	27 October 1991	Independence from the Soviet Union
United Arab Emirates	2 December 1971	End of a treaty relationship with the United Kingdom
Uzbekistan	31 August 1991	Independence from the Soviet Union declared
Vietnam	7th century BC	Hùng king established Van Lang, the first kingdom of Vietnam
Yemen	1 November 1918	Independence of North Yemen from the Turkish Empire
Yemen	30 November 1967	Independence of South Yemen from the United Kingdom

=== Notes ===
==== Burma ====
Burma was almost completely occupied by the Imperial Japanese Army during the Second World War. Many Burmese fought alongside Japan in the initial stages of the war, though the Burmese Army and most Burmese switched sides in 1945.

A transitional government sponsored by the British government was formed in the years following the Second World War, ultimately leading to Burma's independence in January 1948.

==== Cambodia ====
Following the capitulation of France and the formation of the Vichy regime, France's Indochinese possessions were given to Japan. While there was some argument that Indochina should not be returned to France, particularly from the United States, Cambodia nevertheless remained under French rule after the end of hostilities.

France had placed Norodom Sihanouk on the throne in 1941 and was hoping for a puppet monarch. They were mistaken. However, the King led the way to Cambodian independence in 1953, taking advantage of the background of the First Indochina War being fought in Vietnam.

==== Ceylon ====
Ceylon was an important base of operations for the Western Allies during the Second World War. The British gave in to popular pressure for independence and in February 1948, the country won its independence as the Dominion of Ceylon.

==== China ====
For some clarification and more detail including the sovereignty status of the Republic of China, see the following articles: History of China, Cross-Strait relations, One-China policy and Political status of Taiwan. Hong Kong was returned to the United Kingdom following its occupation by the Japanese during the Second World War. It was controlled directly by a British governor until the expiry of the ninety-nine-year lease of the New Territories, which occurred in 1997. From that date, the territory was returned to People's Republic of China and controlled as a Special Administrative Region of the People's Republic of China.

==== Philippines ====
Philippine revolutionaries unilaterraly declared independence from Spain in 1898, during the Spanish–American War, but sovereignty remained with Spain. Spain ceded the Philippines to the United States in the 1898 Treaty of Paris that concluded that war. In 1899, Philippine revolutionaries established the First Philippine Republic. Shortly thereafter, the Philippine–American War began, ending in 1901 with a U.S. victory, though isolated fighting continued for several years thereafter.

In 1902, the Philippines became a U.S. territory with the ratification of the Treaty of Paris on April 11, 1899, later becoming a U.S. Commonwealth in 1936. It was occupied by the Japanese during the Second World War. In 1943, with Japan granting it a short-lived nominal independence. In 1944, the Allied invasion of the Philippines by combined U.S. and Filipino troops began, which resulted in Americans and Filipinos regaining full control of the nation. In 1946, the United States recognised Philippine independence in the 1946 Treaty of Manila.

== Timeline ==
The "colonial power" and "colonial name" columns are merged when required to denote territories, where current countries are established, that have not been decolonised but achieved independence in different ways.

Country/region (Note: Timeline list arranged according to current countries. Explanatory notes are added in cases where decolonisation was achieved jointly or where the current state is formed by a merger of previously decolonised states. Former Soviet republics (Armenia, Azerbaijan, Georgia, Kazakhstan, Kyrgyzstan), as well as Kuwait under Iraqi rule are excluded from this list, as they were not administered as colonies. Countries like Bhutan, China, Iran, and Japan are also excluded, as they were able to maintain their sovereignty despite encroachment by the Western colonial powers.)	Colonial name	Colonial power (Note: Some territories changed hands multiple times, so in the list is mentioned the last colonial power. In addition to it, the mandatory or trustee powers are mentioned for territories that were League of Nations mandates and United Nations trust territories.)	Independence declared and/or achieved (Note: A declaration of independence des not necessarily equate with achievement of independence. However, as of 2023, this date is presented as a date of decolonisation in this article even if the polity declaring independence did not achieve independence. Dates for territories annexed by or integrated into previously decolonised independent countries are given in separate notes. Subsequent mergers, secessions and civil and other wars in the period after decolonisation and the resulting states and federations are not part of this list and are only noted- see the list of sovereign states by formation date. Date when a commonwealth realm abolished its monarchy is noted. Any discrepancies between dates listed here and public holidays celebrating the country's independence (and whether the date listed is celebrated as a holiday at all) are noted, as well as the national day if the country does not have an independence day.)	First head of state (Note: For countries that became independent either as a Commonwealth realm or as a parliamentary republic the head of government is listed instead.)	Independence won through
Philippines	Spanish East Indies	Spain	12 June 1898 declared	Emilio Aguinaldo	Philippine Revolution (Note: In the 1896-19 period there were the Philippine Revolution and Philippine–American War. Before the American invasion and annexation, the country declared independence from Spain in 1898 nut sovereignty remained with Spain, which ceded the country to the United States.)
Philippines	Philippines	Empire of Japan; United States	4 July 1946	Manuel Roxas	World War II
Philippines	Republic of the Philippines	United States	4 July 1946 achieved	Manuel Roxas	Treaty of Manila (1946)
Yemen (Note: North Yemen and South Yemen were unified into the Republic of Yemen on 22 May 1990.)	Mutawakkilite Kingdom of Yemen	Ottoman Empire	1 November 1918	Yahya I	World War I
Yemen	Colony and Protectorate of Aden	British Empire	30 November 1967	Qahtan Mohammed al-Shaabi	Aden Emergency
Afghanistan	Emirate of Afghanistan	British Empire	19 August 1919	Amanullah Khan	Third Anglo-Afghan War
Egypt (Note: As the Kingdom of Egypt. Transcontinental country, partially located in Africa.)	Sultanate of Egypt	British Empire	28 February 1922 (Note: Not celebrated as a holiday. On 28 February 1922 the British government issued the Unilateral Declaration of Egyptian Independence. Through this declaration, the British government unilaterally ended its protectorate over Egypt and granted it nominal independence except four "reserved" areas: foreign relations, communications, the military and the Anglo-Egyptian Sudan. The Anglo-Egyptian treaty of 1936 reduced British involvement, but still was not welcomed by Egyptian nationalists, who wanted full independence from Britain, which was not achieved until 23 July 1952. The last British troops left Egypt after the Suez Crisis of 1956. For this, the 23 July date, celebrated as Revolution Day, serves as Egypt's national day.)	Fuad I (Note: Although the leaders of the 1952 revolution (Mohammed Naguib and Gamal Abdel Nasser) became the de facto leaders of Egypt, neither would assume office until 17 September of that year when Naguib became Prime Minister, succeeding Aly Maher Pasha who was sworn in on the day of the revolution. Nasser would succeed Naguib as Prime Minister on 25 February 1954.)	Egyptian revolution of 1919
Iraq	Mandatory Iraq	British Empire	3 October 1932 (Note: Celebrated as National Day. (While Iraq does not have a holiday called Independence Day, National Day is celebrated as such).)	Faisal I of Iraq	(Note: The Iraqi revolt against the British was an armed uprising that failed to prevent the incoming British colonisation.)
Lebanon	Greater Lebanon	France	22 November 1943	Bechara El Khoury (Note: Riad Al Solh was Prime Minister on the date of independence.)	–
Syria	Mandate of Syria	France	30 November 1943	Shukri al-Quwatli	Syrian Revolution
Indonesia (Note: Transcontinental country, partially located in Oceania.)	Dutch East Indies	Netherlands	17 August 1945	Sukarno	Indonesian National Revolution
Indonesia	Empire of Japan	Japan	27 December 1949 (Note: Not celebrated as a holiday. Netherlands New Guinea was separated from the Dutch East Indies on 29 December 1949. Following skirmishes with Indonesia in 1961 and the New York Agreement, the Netherlands transferred the authority of Dutch New Guinea to a UN protectorate on 1 October 1962 and it was integrated into Indonesia on 1 May 1963. The date 17 August 1945 (when Sukarno formally proclaimed Indonesia's independence) is celebrated as Indonesia's date of independence.)		Indonesian National Revolution
Democratic Republic of Vietnam (Note: The Democratic Republic of Vietnam declared independence on 2 September 1945 from Japan but was not recognised by any other countries. The State of Vietnam declared independence on 14 June 1949 as an associated state within the French Union. South Vietnam was the successor state to the State of Vietnam under the name of the Republic of Vietnam. Both parts of Vietnam merged into the Socialist Republic of Vietnam on 2 July 1976, after the Vietnam War.)	French Indochina; Empire of Japan	France; Japan	2 September 1945	Hồ Chí Minh	August Revolution
Jordan	Emirate of Transjordan	British Empire	25 May 1946	Abdullah I	
Pakistan (Note: As the Dominion of Pakistan.)	India	British Empire	14 August 1947	Liaquat Ali Khan (Note: Muhammad Ali Jinnah became Governor-General of Pakistan upon independence.)	(Note: See Pakistan Movement.)
Bangladesh as part of Pakistan	India	British Empire	14 August 1947 (Note: Not celebrated as a holiday. On 16 December 1971, after months of fighting starting from 26 March of that year, Bangladesh formally seceded from Pakistan. The 26 March date is celebrated as Bangladesh's date of independence.)	Liaquat Ali Khan (Note: Sheikh Mujibur Rahman was the President on the date of Bangladesh's secession.)	-
India (Note: As the Dominion of India.)	India	British Empire	15 August 1947 (Note: Subsequently, a free and sovereign India unilaterally annexed Hyderabad State from Mir Osman Ali Khan in 1948 and Goa from Portugal in 1961; Puducherry was ceded by France in 1954. On 26 January 1950, India formally abolished its Commonwealth monarchy and became a republic.)	Jawaharlal Nehru (Note: Remained Prime Minister when India abolished it monarchy. Rajendra Prasad became President upon abolition.)	Indian independence movement
Myanmar (Note: As the Union of Burma.)	Japan	British Empire	1 August 1943	U Nu	
Myanmar	British Burma	British Empire	4 January 1948	U Nu	
Sri Lanka (Note: As the Dominion of Ceylon.)	British Ceylon	British Empire	4 February 1948	Don Senanayake	-
Sri Lanka	British Ceylon	British Empire	22 February 1972	Don Senanayake	-
Israel	Mandatory Palestine	British Empire; Arab League	14 May 1948 (Note: 5 Iyar 5708 on the Jewish calendar. As Israel based its holidays on the Jewish calendar, celebrations do not always correspond with the Georgian date. One day after Israel declared its independence, the Arab League launched an attack on Israel that would last until 20 July 1949, ending with Israel securing its sovereignty.)	David Ben-Gurion (Note: Originally as Chairman of the Provisional State Council before becoming Prime Minister three days after independence; Chaim Weizmann succeeded him on that same day. Both remained in office (this time with Weizmann as President) on the date of the armistice.)	1948 Palestine war
(South Vietnam) State of Vietnam (South Vietnam) Republic of Vietnam (Note: The Provisional Central Government of Vietnam was formed on 23 May 1948, then State of Vietnam was established in 1949 with ex-emperor Bảo Đại as head of state, it was recognised as an associated state within the French Union. The Democratic Republic of Vietnam declared independence on 2 September 1945 but de facto a breakaway state without international recognise until Geneva Conference. Republic of Vietnam was the legal successor state to the State of Vietnam after 1955 State of Vietnam referendum. Both parts of Vietnam merged into the Socialist Republic of Vietnam on 2 July 1976, after the Vietnam War.)	French Indochina	France	14 June 1949	Ngo Dinh Diem	1955 State of Vietnam referendum
(South Vietnam) State of Vietnam (South Vietnam) Republic of Vietnam	French Indochina	France	26 October 1955	Ngo Dinh Diem	1955 State of Vietnam referendum
South Korea	Japanese Korea	Empire of Japan	15 August 1945	Syngman Rhee (Note: Assumed office on 24 July 1948 as President.)	Korean independence movement
South Korea	Japanese Korea	Empire of Japan	15 August 1948 (Note: Date of Japanese surrender and the transfer of the southern half of the Korean peninsula to the United States. Celebrated as Liberation Day (or "Gwangbokjeol"). American administration lasted exactly three years. Gaecheonjeol ("National Foundation Day") celebrates the date 3 October 2333 BC, which (according to Korean mythology) was when the Gojoseon kingdom was founded.)	Syngman Rhee	Korean independence movement
North Korea	Japanese Korea	Empire of Japan	15 August 1945	Kim Il Sung (Note: Assumed office as Premier on 9 September 1948. Kim Tu-bong became Chairman of the Standing Committee of the Supreme People's Assembly upon that same date.)	Korean independence movement
North Korea	Japanese Korea	Empire of Japan	10 July 1948 (Note: Date of Japanese surrender and the transfer of the northern half of the Korean peninsula to the Soviet Union. Celebrated as Liberation Day (or "Jogukhaebangŭi nal"). This date, 10 July 1948, is the formal establishment of the Democratic People's Republic of Korea where the Constitution of North Korea took effect. Soviet administration lasted until 9 September 1948 where it is celebrated as Day of the Foundation of the Republic, serves as North Korea's national day.)	Kim Il Sung	Korean independence movement
China (Note: As the Republic of China.)	Manchukuo	Empire of Japan	9 August 1945	Chiang kai shek (Note: Chairman of the National Government of the Republic of China at "2"hat time. After the Japanese surrender, communists soon took most of North-Eastern China because of the Soviets' transfer occupation zone, then the civil war begin and both communists and nationalists began to compete for Northeast China.)	Second Sino-Japanese War
China	Nationalist government on Mainland China	Republic of China	1 October 1949 (Note: Date of establishment of the People's Republic by the Chinese Communist Party (CCP). The central government of the Republic of China evacuated to Taiwan on 7 December 1949 and continued to contested its claim of the sovereignty of all of China with the People's Republic. See also One-China policy.)	Chiang kai shek	Chinese Civil War
Taiwan and Penghu (Note: After World War II, the islands of Taiwan and Penghu were placed under the administration of the Republic of China under General Order No. 1, although they nominally remained part of Japan. Before the post-war treaties were to be signed by the ROC and Japan, the ROC government was defeated in the Chinese Civil War to the Chinese Communist Party (CCP) and decamped to the island of Taiwan. Japan relinquished the claims to Taiwan and Penghu in the Treaty of San Francisco on 28 April 1952, but the sovereignty of the islands remained undetermined to this day. Taiwan and Penghu are still today governed by the Republic of China in a post-war capacity recognised by a few states as the sole legitimate government of "China". See also Political status of Taiwan and Theory of the Undetermined Status of Taiwan.)	Taiwan	Japan	15 August 1945	Chen Yi	Second Sino-Japanese War
Taiwan and Penghu	Taiwan	Japan	25 October 1945 (Note: Date when Taiwan and Penghu were returned to the Republic of China.)	Chen Yi	Second Sino-Japanese War
Taiwan and Penghu	Taiwan	Japan	28 April 1952 (Note: Date when the San Francisco Peace Treaty takes effect.)	Chen Yi	Second Sino-Japanese War
Japan	Occupation of Japan	United States	28 April 1952	Shigeru Yoshida	San Francisco Peace Treaty
Laos (Note: As the Kingdom of Laos.)	French Indochina	France	22 October 1953 (Note: Not celebrated as a holiday. National Day celebrates the date 2 December 1975, which was when the Pathet Lao established the Lao People's Democratic Republic and ended both the monarchy and the decades-long civil war.)	Sisavang Vong (Note: Souvanna Phouma was Prime Minister on the date of independence.)	(Note: Although the First Indochina War occurred throughout French Indochina, most of the fighting was between the Việt Minh and France with occasional resistance from Laos and Cambodia. (The Kingdoms of Laos and Cambodia were nominal allies with France.))
Cambodia	French Indochina	France	9 November 1953	Norodom Sihanouk	-
Malaysia	Malaya; Colony of North Borneo; Colony of Sarawak	British Empire	31 August 1957	Tuanku Abdul Rahman	Malayan Emergency (Note: The Malayan Communist Party fought in the Malayan Emergency between June 1948 – 12 July 1960.)
Malaysia	Malaya; Colony of North Borneo; Colony of Sarawak	British Empire	16 September 1963	Tuanku Abdul Rahman	Malayan Emergency
Cyprus	British Cyprus	British Empire	16 August 1960 (Note: Not celebrated as a holiday. For reasons unknown, Cyprus celebrates 1 October 1960, as its date of independence.)	Makarios III	(Note: Armed struggles by the EOKA (Greek) and TMT (Turkish) organisations.)
Kuwait	Sheikhdom of Kuwait	British Empire	19 June 1961 (Note: Not celebrated as a holiday. National Day celebrates the date 25 February 1950, which was when Abdullah Al-Salim Al-Sabah was crowned.)	Abdullah Al-Salim Al-Sabah	–
Oman	Muscat and Oman (Note: Muscat and Oman was de facto a British protectorate. On 4 June 1856, the Sultan who ruled from Stone Town, Zanzibar, died without appointing an heir. With British intervention on 6 April 1861, Zanzibar and Oman were divided into two separate principalities. Zanzibar later became a formal British protectorate, but the British influence over Muscat and Oman remained informal. In 1962 Britain declared Muscat and Oman an independent nation.)	British Empire	9 August 1970	Qaboos bin Said	Night attack on Muscat: (Note: See the Dhofar Rebellion defeated with British help.)
Singapore	Straits Settlements	British Empire	31 August 1963	Yusof Ishak	–
Singapore	Straits Settlements	British Empire	9 August 1965 (Note: Between 16 September 1963 and 9 August 1965 Singapore was part of the Federation of Malaysia.)	Yusof Ishak	–
Maldives	Maldives	British Empire	26 July 1965	Muhammad Fareed Didi	–
Qatar	Qatar	British Empire	3 September 1971	Ahmad bin Ali Al Thani	–
United Arab Emirates	Trucial States	British Empire	2 December 1971 (Note: The independent UAE was joined by Ras al-Khaimah on 11 February 1972.)	Zayed bin Sultan Al Nahyan	–
Bahrain	Bahrain	British Empire	15 August 1971 (Note: Not celebrated as a holiday. National Day celebrates the date 16 December 1961, which was when Isa ibn Salman was crowned.)	Isa ibn Salman Al Khalifa (Note: Khalifa bin Salman Al Khalifa was Prime Minister on the date of independence.)	(Note: The Bahraini independence survey, 1970 was a United Nation-run survey asking Bahrainis if they would rather be independent or under Iran's control. Although a non-binding survey that makes no mention of the United Kingdom, the results (which showed an overwhelming majority supporting independence) led Iran to denounce its claims over Bahrain, which in turn led to the United Kingdom ending its protectorate.)
East Timor	Dutch East Indies	Dutch East Indies; German Empire			Under colonial occupation. (Note: The colonial history of East Timor is too complex to summarise here. See the article on that country and related detail articles.)
East Timor	Portuguese Timor	Portugal; United Kingdom			Under colonial occupation.
East Timor	Empire of Japan	Japan			Under colonial occupation.
East Timor	Portuguese Timor	Portugal	28 November 1975 (Note: Independence from Portugal declared on 28 November 1975. but not recognised.)	Francisco Xavier do Amaral Xanana Gusmão	Under colonial occupation.
East Timor	Timor Timur	Indonesia	1999 (Note: The Indonesians left in 1999 and East Timor came under the administration of the United Nations.)	Xanana Gusmão	Under colonial occupation.
East Timor	United Nations	(United Nations) East Timor	20 May 2002	Xanana Gusmão	UNTAET; 1999 East Timorese crisis
Brunei	Brunei	British Empire	1 January 1984	Hassanal Bolkiah	(Note: The Brunei Revolt was a rebellion against the sultan suppressed with British assistance in 1966.)
Hong Kong	British Hong Kong	British Empire	1 July 1997 (Note: Date of transfer to the People's Republic of China.)	Tung Chee-hwa	–
Macau	Portuguese Macau	Portugal	20 December 1999	Edmund Ho	–
Palestine (Note: Also referred to as Judea and Samaria Area or West Bank and Gaza Strip.) (Note: In the aftermath of the 1948 Arab–Israeli War the Palestinian territories were divided between Israel, Egypt and Jordan. After the Egypt–Israel peace treaty (1982) and Jordanian disengagement from the West Bank (1988), following decades of Arab–Israeli conflict, the Palestine Liberation Organisation declared independence for a State of Palestine, but its control over the West Bank and Gaza (through the Palestinian National Authority) is still limited due to continued conflict with Israel.) (Note: Israel allows the PNA to execute some functions in the Palestinian territories, depending on the area classification. It maintains minimal interference (retaining control of borders: air, sea beyond internal waters, (Note: Map of Gaza fishing limits, "security zones".) land) in the Gaza Strip (its interior and Egypt portion of the land border are under Hamas control), and varying degrees of interference elsewhere. See also Israeli-occupied territories.)	Mandatory Palestine; West Bank	British Empire; Arab League; Jordan	14 May 1948; 10 June 1967; 15 November 1988; (Note: It is unclear here how these dates relate to the other columns of is table row.) independence pending due to territorial dispute with Israel	N/A; Yasser Arafat; Mahmoud Abbas	Six-Day War; Egypt–Israel peace treaty; Jordanian disengagement from the West Bank; Israeli–Palestinian conflict

== Soviet Union ==
The 9 states may be divided into the following five regional categories. The distinguishing traits of each region result from geographic and cultural factors as well as their respective historical relations with Russia. Not included in these categories are the several de facto independent states presently lacking international recognition (read below: Separatist conflicts).

Region	Country name	First flag	Current flag	Capital	Independence
Asia	Russia (Russian Federation)			Moscow	12 December 1991
Central Asia	Uzbekistan (Republic of Uzbekistan)			Tashkent	31 August 1991
Central Asia	Kazakhstan (Republic of Kazakhstan)			Astana	16 December 1991
Central Asia	Kyrgyzstan (Kyrgyz Republic)			Bishkek	31 August 1991
Central Asia	Tajikistan (Republic of Tajikistan)			Dushanbe	9 September 1991
Central Asia	Turkmenistan			Ashgabat	27 October 1991
Transcaucasia	Georgia (formerly the Republic of Georgia)			Tbilisi	9 April 1991
Transcaucasia	Azerbaijan (Republic of Azerbaijan)			Baku	30 August 1991
Transcaucasia	Armenia (Republic of Armenia)			Yerevan	21 September 1991
Total former Soviet Union

== British colonies, protectorates and mandates ==
Country	Pre-independence name (different)	Date	Year of independence or first stage	Notes
Afghanistan	Northern Persia	19 August	1919	Anglo-Afghan Treaty of 1919
Bahrain		15 August	1971	
Brunei		1 January	1984	
Cyprus		16 August	1960	Cyprus Independence Day is commonly celebrated on 1 October.
Egypt		28 February	1922	Control over the Suez Canal Zone was maintained until 1952.
India	British India	15 August	1947	Independence Day (India)
Iraq		3 October	1932	
Israel	Mandatory Palestine	14 May	1948	End of British mandate Independence Day (Israel); Palestine declared independence from Israel on 15 November 1988.
Jordan	Transjordan	25 May	1946	
Kuwait		19 June	1961	
Malaysia	Four parts: Malaya; North Borneo; Singapore; Sarawak	31 August	1957	As the Federation of Malaya (Federation of Malaya Independence Act 1957). North Borneo (now Sabah), Sarawak and Singapore gained full independence and joined Malaysia on 16 September 1963 under the Malaysia Agreement (Malaysia Act 1963). Singapore gained independence from Malaysia on 9 August 1965.
Maldives		26 July	1965	
Mauritius		12 March	1968	
Myanmar	British Burma	4 January	1948	Gained independence as Burma. Renamed Myanmar in 1989, but still officially known by the United Kingdom government as Burma.
Oman	Sultanate of Muscat and Oman	20 December	1951	
Pakistan	British India	14 August	1947	Partition of India; Bangladesh gained independence from Pakistan on 26 March 1971.
Qatar	British Qatari Protectorate	3 September	1971	
Seychelles		29 June	1976	
Singapore		3 June	1959	Became self-governing on 3 June 1959 and gained independence from Malaysia on 9 August 1965.
Sri Lanka	Ceylon	4 February	1948	Gained independence as the Dominion of Ceylon. Renamed Sri Lanka in 1972.
United Arab Emirates	Trucial States	2 December	1971	National Day (United Arab Emirates)
Yemen	Protectorate of South Arabia; Federation of South Arabia	30 November	1967	South Yemen 1967

== List of European colonies in Asia ==
British colonies in South Asia, East Asia, And Southeast Asia:

- (British rule in Burma) British Burma (1824–1948, merged with India by the British from 1886 to 1937)
- British Ceylon (1833-1948, now Sri Lanka)
- British Hong Kong (1842–1997)
- (British Raj) Colonial India (includes the territory of present-day India, Pakistan and Bangladesh)

Danish India (1696–1869)
(Sweden) Swedish Parangipettai (1733)
British India (1613–1947)

British East India Company (1757–1858)
British Raj (1858–1947)

French colonies in South and Southeast Asia:

- French India (1769–1954)
- French Indochina (1887–1953), including:

- French Cambodia (1863–1953)
- French Laos (1893–1953)
- French Cochinchine, Annam and Tonkin (1862–1949, now Vietnam)
- Guangzhouwan (1898–1945)

Dutch, British, Portuguese colonies and Russian territories in Asia:

- Dutch India (1605–1825)
- Dutch Bengal
- Dutch Ceylon (1656–1796)
- Portuguese Ceylon (1505–1658)
- Dutch East Indies (now Indonesia) – Dutch colony from 1800 to 1949 (included Netherlands New Guinea until 1962)
- Portuguese India (1510–1961)
- Portuguese Macau – Portuguese colony, the first European colony in China (1557–1999)
- Portuguese Timor (1702–1975, now East Timor)
- (British Empire) Malaya (now part of Malaysia):

(Portuguese Empire) Portuguese Malacca (1511–1641)
(Dutch Empire) Dutch Malacca (1641–1824)
(British Empire) British Malaya, included:

- Straits Settlements (1826–1946)
- Federated Malay States (1895–1946)
- Unfederated Malay States (1885–1946)

Federation of Malaya (under British rule, 1948–1963)

- (British Empire) British Borneo (now part of Malaysia), including:

- Labuan (1848–1946)h
- North Borneo (1882–1941)

- Crown Colony of North Borneo (1946–1963)

- Crown Colony of Sarawak (1946–1963)

- Brunei

- British Brunei (1888–1984) (British protectorate)

- Outer Manchuria – ceded to Russian Empire through Treaty of Aigun (1858) and Treaty of Peking (1860)
- Philippines:

(Spanish Empire) Spanish Philippines (1565–1898, 3rd longest European colony in Asia, 333 years),

- (British Empire) Singapore – British colony (1819–1959)
- (United States) Insular Government of the Philippine Islands - U.S. colony (1902-1946)
- Taiwan:

(Spanish Empire) Spanish Formosa (1626–1642)
Dutch Formosa (1624–1662)

- Bahrain

- (Portuguese Empire) Portuguese Bahrain (1521–1602)
- British Protectorate (1861–1971)

- Iraq

- Mandatory Iraq (1920–1932) (British protectorate)
- Kingdom of Iraq (1932–1958)

- Israel and Palestine

- Mandatory Palestine (1920–1948) (British Mandate)

- Jordan

- Emirate of Transjordan (1921–1946) (British protectorate)

- Kuwait

- Sheikhdom of Kuwait (1899–1961) (British protectorate)

- Lebanon and Syria

- (France) French Mandate for Syria and the Lebanon (1923–1946)

- Oman

- (Portuguese Empire) Portuguese Oman (1507–1650)
- Muscat and Oman (1892–1971) (British protectorate)

- Qatar

- British protectorate of Qatar (1916–1971)

- United Arab Emirates

- Trucial States (1820–1971) (British protectorate)

- Yemen

- (Aden Colony) Aden Protectorate (1869–1963)
- (Aden Colony) Colony of Aden (1937–1963)
- Federation of South Arabia (1962–1967)
- (British Empire) Protectorate of South Arabia (1963–1967)

=== Independent states ===
- Afghanistan – founded by the Anglo-Afghan Treaty of 1919 of the United Kingdom and declared independence in 1919

- Emirate of Afghanistan (1879–1919) (British protectorate)

- (Taiwan) China – independent, but within European cultures of influence which were largely limited to the colonised ports except for Manchuria.

- Concessions in China
- Shanghai International Settlement (1863–1941)
- Shanghai French Concession (1849–1943)
- Concessions in Tianjin (1860–1947)

- Bhutan – in British sphere of influence
- Iran – in the Russian sphere of influence in the north and British in the south
- (Empire of Japan) Japan – a Great power that had its own colonial empire (including Korea and Taiwan)
- Mongolia – in the Russian sphere of influence and later Soviet controlled
- Nepal – in British sphere of influence
- Saudi Arabia - most of Saudi Arabia has always been independent, including the Sharifate of Mecca in Hejaz which was under the Ottomans but with a dual system of government shared between the Sharif and the Ottoman Wali or governor.
- Thailand – the only independent state in Southeast Asia, but bordered by a British sphere of influence in the north and south and French influence in the northeast and east
- Turkey – successor to the Ottoman Empire in 1923; the Ottoman Empire itself could be considered a colonial empire

== Asian colonies from the 17th century to the end of the Second World War (Japanese) ==
The following list shows the colonial powers following the end of World War II in 1945, their colonial or administrative possessions and the date of decolonisation.

- Japan:
  - Manchuria (Manchukuo), Northern China (1945/1946)
  - Philippines (1945/1946)
  - Burma (1945/1948)
  - North Korea (1945/1948)
  - South Korea (1945/1948)
  - Taiwan (1945/1949)
  - Malaysia
  - Singapore (1965)
  - Taiwan (1642)
  - Indonesia (1945/1949)
  - Netherlands New Guinea (1962)

Territory	Date	Notes
South Sakhalin	1905–1945	
Mainland China	1931–1945	Manchukuo 50 million (1940), Jehol, Kwantung Leased Territory, Jiangsu, Shanghai, Shandong, Hebei, Beijing, Tianjin, plus parts of Guangdong, Guangxi, Hubei, Hunan, Fujian, Guizhou, Inner Mongolia
Japan	Prewar–1945	Present day Japan, Kuril and Ryukyu Islands
Korea	1910–1945	Both North and South
Taiwan	1895–1945	
Hong Kong	25 December 1941 – 30 August 1945	Hong Kong (UK)
:: East Asia (subtotal)	–	
Vietnam	22 September 1940 – August 1945	As French Indochina (FR), Empire of Vietnam
Cambodia	July 1941 – August 1945	As French Indochina, Japanese occupation of Cambodia,
Laos	July 1941 - August 1945	As French Indochina, Japanese occupation of Laos, Kingdom of Luang Prabang
Thailand	8 December 1941 – 15 August 1945	Independent State but Allied with Japan
Malaya	8 December 1941 - 2 September 1945 (Malaya), 16 December 1941 – 12 September 1945 (Sarawak, Brunei, Labuan, North Borneo)	As Malaya (UK), British Borneo (UK), Brunei (UK)
Philippines	8 December 1941 – 2 September 1945	Philippines (US), Second Philippine Republic
Dutch East Indies	11 January 1942 - September 1945	Dutch East Indies (NL)
Singapore	8 February 1942 – 12 September 1945	Singapore (UK)
Burma	14 December 1941 – 13 September 1945	Burma (UK), State of Burma
Portuguese Timor	19 February 1942 – 11 September 1945	Portuguese Timor (PT)
:: Southeast Asia (subtotal)	–	
New Guinea	December 1941 – September 1945	As New Guinea (AU)
Guam	8 December 1941 – 10 August 1944	From Guam (US)
South Seas Mandate	1919–1945	From Germany
Nauru	26 August 1942 – 13 September 1945	From Nauru (AU, UK, NZ)
Wake Island, US	8 December 1941 – 4 September 1945	US
Kiribati	December 1941 – 1945	From Gilbert Islands (UK)
:: Pacific Islands (subtotal)	–	

Disclaimer: Not all areas were considered part of Imperial Japan but rather part of puppet states & sphere of influence, allies, included separately for demographic purposes. Sources: POPULSTAT Asia Oceania

Other occupied World War 2 islands:

- Andaman Islands (India) – 29 March 1942 – 9 October 1945
- Christmas Island (Australia) – March 1942 – October 1945

=== Areas attacked but not conquered ===
- Kohima and Manipur (India)
- Dornod (Khalkhin Gol, Mongolia)
- Midway Atoll (United States)

=== Raided without immediate intent of occupation ===
- Air raids
  - Pearl Harbor (Hawaii, United States)
  - Colombo and Trincomalee (Sri Lanka)
  - Air raids on Australia, including:
    - Broome (Western Australia, Australia)
    - Darwin (Northern Territory, Australia)
    - Townsville (Queensland, Australia)
  - Dutch Harbor (Alaska, United States)
  - Lookout Air Raids (Oregon, United States)
- Naval bombardment by submarine
  - British Columbia (Canada)
  - Santa Barbara (California, United States)
  - Fort Stevens (Oregon, United States)
  - Newcastle (New South Wales, Australia)
  - Gregory (Western Australia, Australia)
- Midget sub attack
  - Sydney (New South Wales, Australia)
  - Diego Suarez (Madagascar)

=== Asia Territorial evolution of the British Empire ===
Name of territory	Dates	Status	Comments
Aden	1839	Colony subordinate to Bombay Presidency British India	
Aden	1932	Separate province of British India	
Aden	1937	Separate Crown colony	
Aden	1963	Part of Federation of South Arabia	
Afghanistan	1839–1842	Protectorate	
Afghanistan	1879	Protectorate	
Afghanistan	1919	Independence	
Assam	1874–1905	Province of British India	
Assam	1905–1912	Incorporated into the new province of Eastern Bengal and Assam	
Assam	1912–1947	Province of British India	Now a state of the Republic of India
Bahrain	1880	Protectorate	
Bahrain	1961–1971	Autonomous	
Bahrain	1971	Independence	Invited to join the Trucial States, but declined
Baluchistan	1877–1896	Province	
Baluchistan	1896–1947	Province of British India	
Baluchistan	1947	Part of Pakistan	Now part of Balochistan and the Federally Administered Tribal Areas, in Pakistan
Bantam	1603–1609	Station	
Bantam	1609–1617	Factory	
Bantam	1617–1621	Presidency	
Bantam	1621	Expelled by the Dutch	
Bantam	1630–1634	Subordinated to Surat	
Bantam	1634–1652	Presidency	
Bantam	1652–1682	Subordinated to Surat	
Bantam	1682	Expelled by the Dutch	Now in Indonesia
Bencoolen ("Fort York", later "Fort Marlborough")	1685–1760	Coastal settlements of southwestern Sumatra, subordinated to Madras	
Bencoolen ("Fort York", later "Fort Marlborough")	1760–1785	Presidency	
Bencoolen ("Fort York", later "Fort Marlborough")	1785–1825	Subordinated to Bengal Presidency	
Bencoolen ("Fort York", later "Fort Marlborough")	1825	Part of Dutch East Indies	Now Bengkulu, in Indonesia
Bengal ("Fort William")	1634–1658	Factories	
Bengal ("Fort William")	1658–1681	Subordinated to Madras	
Bengal ("Fort William")	1681–82	Agency	
Bengal ("Fort William")	1682–1694	Presidency of Coromandel and Bengal Settlements	
Bengal ("Fort William")	1694–1698	Subordinated to Madras	
Bengal ("Fort William")	1698–1700	Presidency of Coromandel and Bengal Settlements	
Bengal ("Fort William")	1700–1774	Presidency	
Bengal ("Fort William")	1774–1905	Presidency of British India	
Bengal ("Fort William")	1905–1912	Partitioned between [West] Bengal and Eastern Bengal and Assam	
Bengal ("Fort William")	1912–1937	Presidency of British India	
Bengal ("Fort William")	1937–1947	Province of British India	
Bengal ("Fort William")	1947	Divided between India (West Bengal) and Pakistan (East Bengal)	Now Bangladesh, and part of West Bengal, Bihar, Odisha, and Jharkhand, in India
Brunei	1888	Protectorate	
Brunei	1967	Protected state	
Brunei	1984	Independence	
Burma (now called Myanmar)	1824–1852	Arakan, Tenasserim	
Burma (now called Myanmar)	1852–1886	Lower Burma	
Burma (now called Myanmar)	1885–1886	Upper Burma	
Burma (now called Myanmar)	1886	Lower and Upper Burma United as a province of British India	
Burma (now called Myanmar)	1937	Separate Crown Colony	
Burma (now called Myanmar)	1948	Independence	Name changed to Myanmar after a military junta in 1989.
Eastern Bengal and Assam	1905–1912	Province of British India	Established upon the partition of Bengal (1905)
Eastern Bengal and Assam	1912	Partition reversed	Split between the re-established province of Assam and the re-constituted presidency of Bengal
Ceylon	1795	Ceded by the Dutch and subordinated to the Madras presidency of British India	
Ceylon	1798	Separate Crown colony	
Ceylon	1948	Independence	Now the Democratic Socialist Republic of Sri Lanka
Dansborg	1801–02	Occupied	
Dansborg	1808–1815	Occupied	
Dansborg	1845	purchased and incorporated into British India	Now in Tamil Nadu state, India
Frederiksnagore	1801–02	Occupied	
Frederiksnagore	1808–1815	Occupied	
Frederiksnagore	1845	Purchased and incorporated into British India	Now in West Bengal state, India
Hong Kong	1841	Hong Kong Island occupied	
Hong Kong	1843–1982	Crown colony	
Hong Kong	1860	Kowloon and Stonecutters Island ceded by China	
Hong Kong	1898	New Territories leased from China for 99 years	
Hong Kong	1942–1945	Occupied by Japan	
Hong Kong	1945–1946	Military administration	
Hong Kong	1983–1997	Dependent territory	
Hong Kong	1997	Handover to China as a special administrative region	
Kuwait	1899	Protectorate	
Kuwait	1961	Independence	
Indian Empire (British Raj)	1613	Company rule in India	
Indian Empire (British Raj)	1858	Crown rule over the Indian Princely states, the Presidencies and provinces of British India	
Indian Empire (British Raj)	1947	Independent as India & Pakistan after partition	
Mandatory Iraq	1920–1932	League of Nations mandate never passed, replaced by Anglo-Iraqi treaty with the Kingdom of Iraq	
Java	1811–1816	Territory of the East India Company	restored to the Netherlands
Malaya	1824	Transferred following Anglo-Dutch Treaty of 1824	
Malaya	1824–1867	Territory of British East India Company	
Malaya	1867–1946	Straits Settlements, Crown colony	
Malaya	1895–1946	Federated Malay States, protectorate	
Malaya	1885–1946	Johor, protectorate (part of Unfederated Malay States)	
Malaya	1909–1946	Kedah, protectorate (part of Unfederated Malay States)	
Malaya	1909–1946	Kelantan, protectorate (part of Unfederated Malay States)	
Malaya	1909–1946	Perlis, protectorate (part of Unfederated Malay States)	
Malaya	1909–1946	Terengganu, protectorate (part of Unfederated Malay States)	
Malaya	1942–1945	Japanese occupation	
Malaya	1945–1946	Military Administration	
Malaya	1946–1948	Malayan Union	
Malaya	1948–1957	Federation of Malaya	
Malaya	1957–1963	Independent state	
Malaya	1963	Annex North Borneo and Sarawak forming the renamed federation of Malaysia	
North Borneo	1882–1946	Protectorate	
North Borneo	1945–1946	Military administration	Labuan to British N. Borneo on 15 July 1946
North Borneo	1946–1963	Crown colony	Labuan to British N. Borneo on 15 July 1946
North Borneo	1963	Self-government	
North Borneo	1963	Annexed by Malaya into Malaysia	
Palestine	1920	Mandate	
Palestine	1948	British sovereignty relinquished; the proposed partition between a Jewish and an Arab state never fully materialised; the Jewish state – Israel – was established immediately after British withdrawal, with the short-lived All-Palestine government following six months later	
Palestine	1949	Two sections of the former Palestine Mandate outside Israel – the West Bank and the Gaza Strip – were occupied by Jordan and Egypt respectively following the collapse of the All-Palestine government	
Palestine	1956	Gaza Strip briefly falls under Israeli occupation during the Suez Crisis	
Palestine	1967	West Bank and Gaza Strip fall under Israeli occupation as a consequence of the Six-Day War	
Palestine	1993	A Palestinian National Authority is declared in the West Bank and Gaza Strip; most matters regarding the day-to-day governance of these territories fell under its jurisdiction, in anticipation of a future Palestinian state	
Palestine	2005	Israel formally withdraws from the Gaza Strip, placing it under full PNA control; despite this, Gazan waters are still under Israeli military control	
Pulo Condore Island (Côn Đảo)	1702	Possession of British East India Company	
Pulo Condore Island (Côn Đảo)	1705	Abandoned	Now Côn Đảo, in Vietnam
Sarawak	1888–1946	Protected States	
Sarawak	1945–1946	Military administration	
Sarawak	1946–1963	Crown colony	
Sarawak	1963	Self-government	
Sarawak	1963	Annexed by Malaya into Malaysia	
Straits Settlements	1826–1858	Possession under British East India Company	
Straits Settlements	1858–1867	Subordinated to British India	
Straits Settlements	1867–1946	Crown colony	
Straits Settlements	1942–1945	Occupied by Japan	
Straits Settlements	1946	Dissolved	Now divided between Malacca and Penang, in Malaysia, and Singapore
Qatar	1916–1971	Protectorate	
Qatar	1971	Independence	Invited to join the Trucial States, but declined
Surat	1612–1658	Factory	
Surat	1658–1668	Presidency	
Surat	1668–1685	Possession under British East India Company	
Surat	1685–1703	Subordinated to Bombay	
Surat	1703	Incorporated into Bombay	Now in India
Singapore	1824	Purchased	
Singapore	1824	Part of Straits Settlements (as residency of the Presidency of Bengal)	
Singapore	1867–1946	Part of Straits Settlements (crown colony)	
Singapore	1946–1955	Crown colony	
Singapore	1955–1959	self-governing colony	
Singapore	1959–1963	State of Singapore	
Singapore	1963–1965	Part of Malaysia	
Singapore	1965	Independence	
Transjordan	1920	Part of Palestine Mandate	
Transjordan	1923	Formally separated from Palestine	
Transjordan	1928	Emirate independent, except for military and financial control	
Transjordan	1946	Formal independence	Now known as Jordan
Trucial States	1892	Protectorate	
Trucial States	1971	Formation of Federation of Arab Emirates	Now part of the United Arab Emirates
Weihaiwei	1898–1930	Leased from China	
Weihaiwei	1930	Returned to the Republic of China	Now part of the People's Republic of China
West Bengal ("Bengal")	1905–1912	Province of British India	Established by the partition of Bengal. Abolished with the reversal of the partition and the creation of the new province of Bihar and Orissa.

== Territorial evolution of the French Empire in Asia ==
- French Indochina
  - French Indochinese Union (1887–1954)
    - Laos (protectorate) (1893–1953)
    - Cambodia (protectorate) (1863–1953)
    - Vietnam
      - Cochinchina (Southern Vietnam) (1858–1949)
      - Annam (protectorate) (Central Vietnam) (1883–1949)
      - Tonkin (protectorate) (Northern Vietnam) (1884–1949)
      - State of Vietnam (1949–1954)
      - Democratic Republic of Vietnam
      - Spratly Islands (1933–1939)
      - Paracel Islands (1933–1939)
    - Some territories on the eastern of Thailand. Thailand has lost 3 territories in total in the past 15 years, for example:
      - Chanthaburi Province (1893–1905)
      - Trat Province (1904–1907)
      - Dan Sai District (in the area of the Loei Province: 1903–1907)
- India and Sri Lanka
  - French India
    - French Establishments of India, composed of Pondichéry (1765–1954); Karikal (1725–1954); Mahé (1721–1954) Yanaon (1723–1954); Chandernagor (1673–1952)
- Taiwan
  - The city/port of Keelung (1884–1885)
  - Pescadores Islands (1885)
- Basilan (1845)
- China
  - The territory of Kouang-Tchéou-Wan (a dependency of French Indochina) (1898–1945)
  - The foreign concessions: French Concession of Shanghai (1849–1946), Tianjin (1860–1946) and Hankou (1898–1946)
  - The spheres of French influence officially recognised by China in the provinces of Yunnan, Guangxi, Hainan, Guangdong
  - Shamian Island (1859–1949) (a fifth of the island)
- Palestine
- Syria or French Syria (1920–1946) (French Mandate of Syria)
  - Alawite State (1920–1936)
  - State of Aleppo (1920–1924)
  - State of Jabal Druze (1921–1936)
  - State of Damascus (1920–1924)
  - Sanjak of Alexandretta (now part of Turkey)
  - State of Greater Lebanon (now it is Lebanon) (1920–1946)
- Lebanon or French Lebanon (1920–1946) (French Mandate of Lebanon)
  - Mount Lebanon (An international protocol fixes the autonomy of the mount Lebanon under the protection of France.)
- Yemen
  - Cheikh Saïd (Some French atlases and history books claimed the territory was French, but France never occupied it and never claimed jurisdiction or sovereignty over the territory, which therefore was never French, remaining under Turkish, then Yemen's control.)

== See also ==
- United Nations list of non-self-governing territories
- Dependent territory
- List of predecessors of sovereign states in Asia
- Cold War in Asia
- Persian Gulf Residency
- Western imperialism in Asia
- Taiwan under Japanese rule
- Decolonisation
- Wars of national liberation
