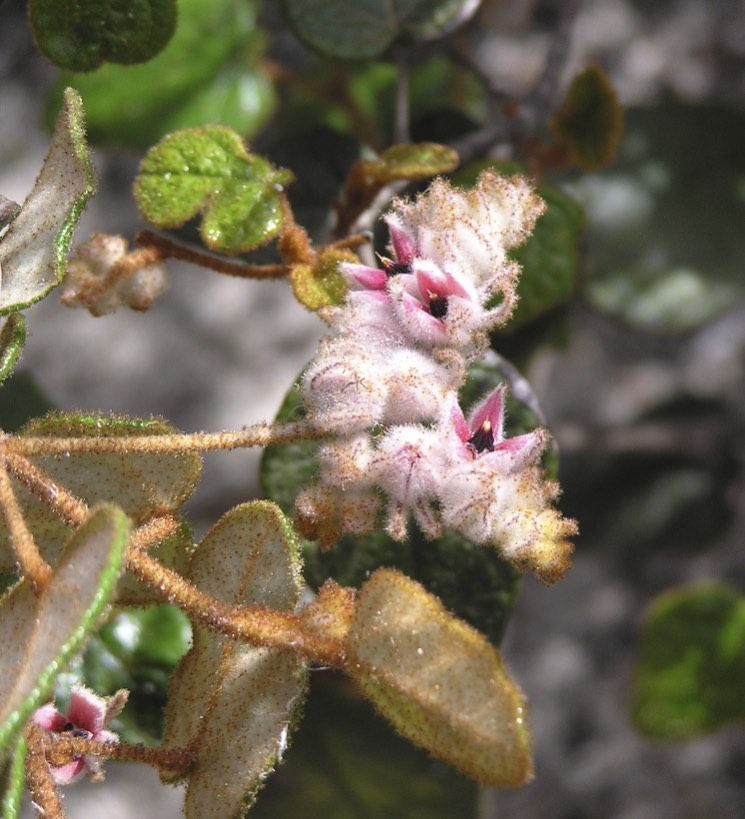
- Near Eneabba

Conservation status
- Priority Three — Poorly Known Taxa (DEC)

Scientific classification
- Kingdom: Plantae
- Clade: Tracheophytes
- Clade: Angiosperms
- Clade: Eudicots
- Clade: Rosids
- Order: Malvales
- Family: Malvaceae
- Genus: Lasiopetalum
- Species: L. oldfieldii

Binomial name
- Lasiopetalum oldfieldii F.Muell.

Synonyms
- Lasiopetalum acutiflorum var. oldfieldii (F.Muell.) Bentham

= Lasiopetalum oldfieldii =

Species of shrub

Lasiopetalum oldfieldii is a species of flowering plant in the family Malvaceae and is endemic to the south-west of Western Australia. It is a low, spreading shrub with rusty-hairy young stems, egg-shaped to narrowly egg-shaped leaves and pink and dark red flowers.

== Description ==
Lasiopetalum oldfieldii is a spreading shrub that typically grows to a height of 0.3–1.5 m (1 ft 0 in – 4 ft 11 in), its stems covered with white or rust-coloured, star-shaped hairs when young. The leaves are arranged alternately along the stems, egg-shaped to narrowly egg-shaped, 15–52 mm (0.59–2.05 in) long and 8–21 mm (0.31–0.83 in) wide on a petiole 5–17 mm (0.20–0.67 in) long. The lower surface of the leaves is densely covered with white and rust-coloured, star-shaped hairs. The flowers are borne in loose groups of 16 to 18, 21–53 mm (0.83–2.09 in) long, each group on a hairy peduncle 13–26 mm (0.51–1.02 in) long, each flower on a pedicel 0.8–2.3 mm (0.031–0.091 in) long with narrowly egg-shaped bracts 1–5 mm (0.039–0.197 in) long at the base and three bracteoles 3.1–9.5 mm (0.12–0.37 in) long below the base of the sepals. The sepals are pink, sometimes with a green base, the lobes 3.3–4.9 mm (0.13–0.19 in) long, white and hairy on the back. The petals are 0.7–1 mm (0.028–0.039 in) long and dark red, the anthers dark red and 2.0–2.8 mm (0.079–0.110 in) long on filaments 0.8–1.4 mm (0.031–0.055 in) long. Flowering occurs from August to November.

== Taxonomy ==
Lasiopetalum oldfieldii was first formally described in 1860 by Ferdinand von Mueller in Fragmenta Phytographiae Australiae from specimens collected near the Murchison River by Pemberton Walcott and Augustus Oldfield. The specific epithet (oldieldii) honours Oldfield.

== Distribution and habitat ==
This lasiopetalum grows in open mallee woodland, scrub or shrubland from near Port Gregory to near Mullewa in the Geraldton Sandplains biogeographic region of south-western Western Australia.

== Conservation status ==
Lasiopetalum oldfieldii is listed as "Priority Three" by the Government of Western Australia Department of Biodiversity, Conservation and Attractions, meaning that it is poorly known and known from only a few locations but is not under imminent threat.
