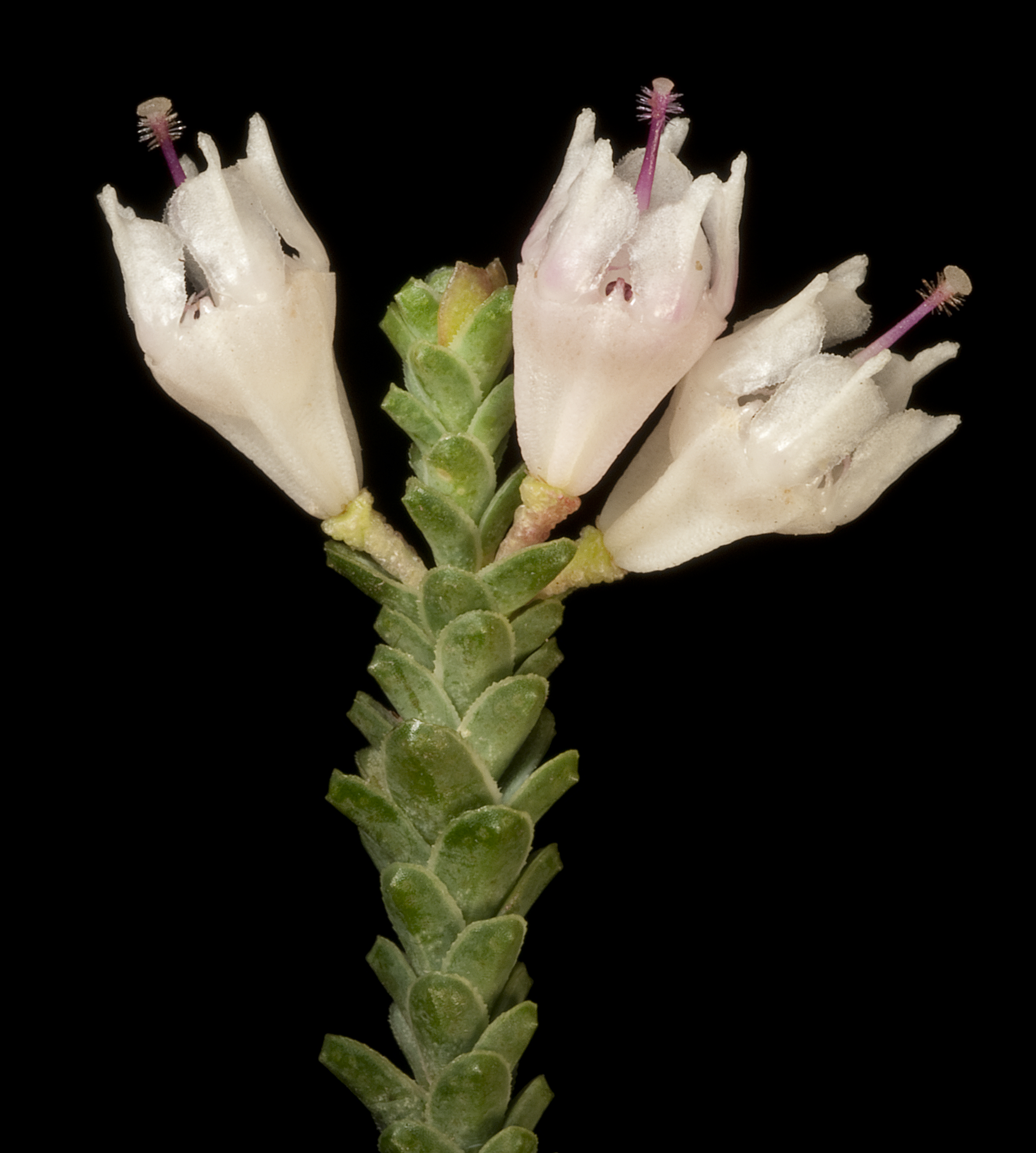

Scientific classification
- Kingdom: Plantae
- Clade: Tracheophytes
- Clade: Angiosperms
- Clade: Eudicots
- Clade: Rosids
- Order: Myrtales
- Family: Myrtaceae
- Genus: Darwinia
- Species: D. pauciflora

Binomial name
- Darwinia pauciflora Benth.
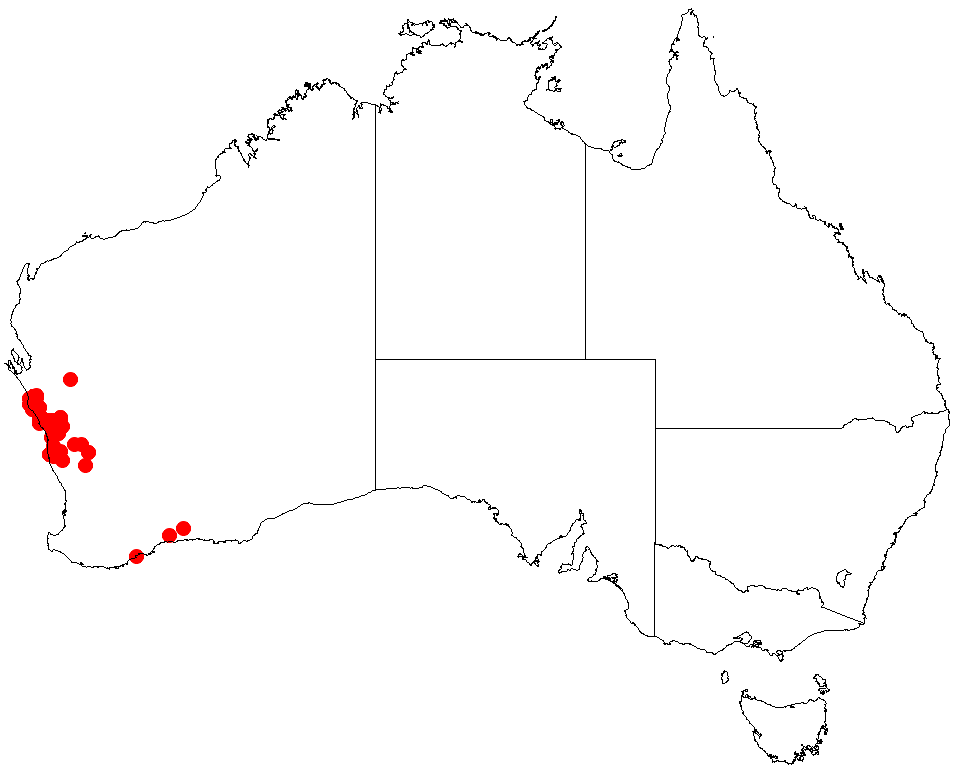
- Occurrence data from AVH

= Darwinia pauciflora =

Species of flowering plant

Darwinia pauciflora is a species of flowering plant in the family Myrtaceae and is endemic to the southwest of Western Australia. It is an open to bushy shrub with oblong to egg-shaped leaves and heads of erect, creamy-white and pink flowers.

== Description ==
Darwinia pauciflora is an open to bushy shrub that typically grows to height of 0.3–1.5 m (1 ft 0 in – 4 ft 11 in) and has many short side branches. Its leaves are oblong to egg-shaped with the narrower end towards the base, sometimes overlapping, 2.0–4.2 mm (0.079–0.165 in) long and usually glaucous. The flowers are arranged in upper leaf axils or on the ends of branches, in heads of 3 to 6, surrounded by short, broad bracteoles but that fall off as the flowers open. The sepal tube is almost 4.2 mm (0.17 in) long and top-shaped with very short lobes. The petals are creamy-white and pink, almost as long as the sepal tube and the style is slightly longer than the petals. Flowering mainly occurs from May to October.

== Taxonomy ==
Darwinia pauciflora was first formally described in 1865 by George Bentham in the Journal of the Linnean Society, Botany from a specimen collected by Augustus Oldfield near the Hutt River. The specific epithet (pauciflora) means "few-flowered".

== Distribution and habitat ==
This darwinia is found on hillsides or sandplains in the Avon Wheatbelt, Geraldton Sandplains and Swan Coastal Plain bioregions in the south-west of Western Australia where it grows in sandy soils.
