= Prostanthera scutata =

Conservation status
- Priority Two — Poorly Known Taxa (DEC)

Scientific classification
- Kingdom: Plantae
- Clade: Tracheophytes
- Clade: Angiosperms
- Clade: Eudicots
- Clade: Asterids
- Order: Lamiales
- Family: Lamiaceae
- Genus: Prostanthera
- Species: P. scutata

Binomial name
- Prostanthera scutata C.A.Gardner
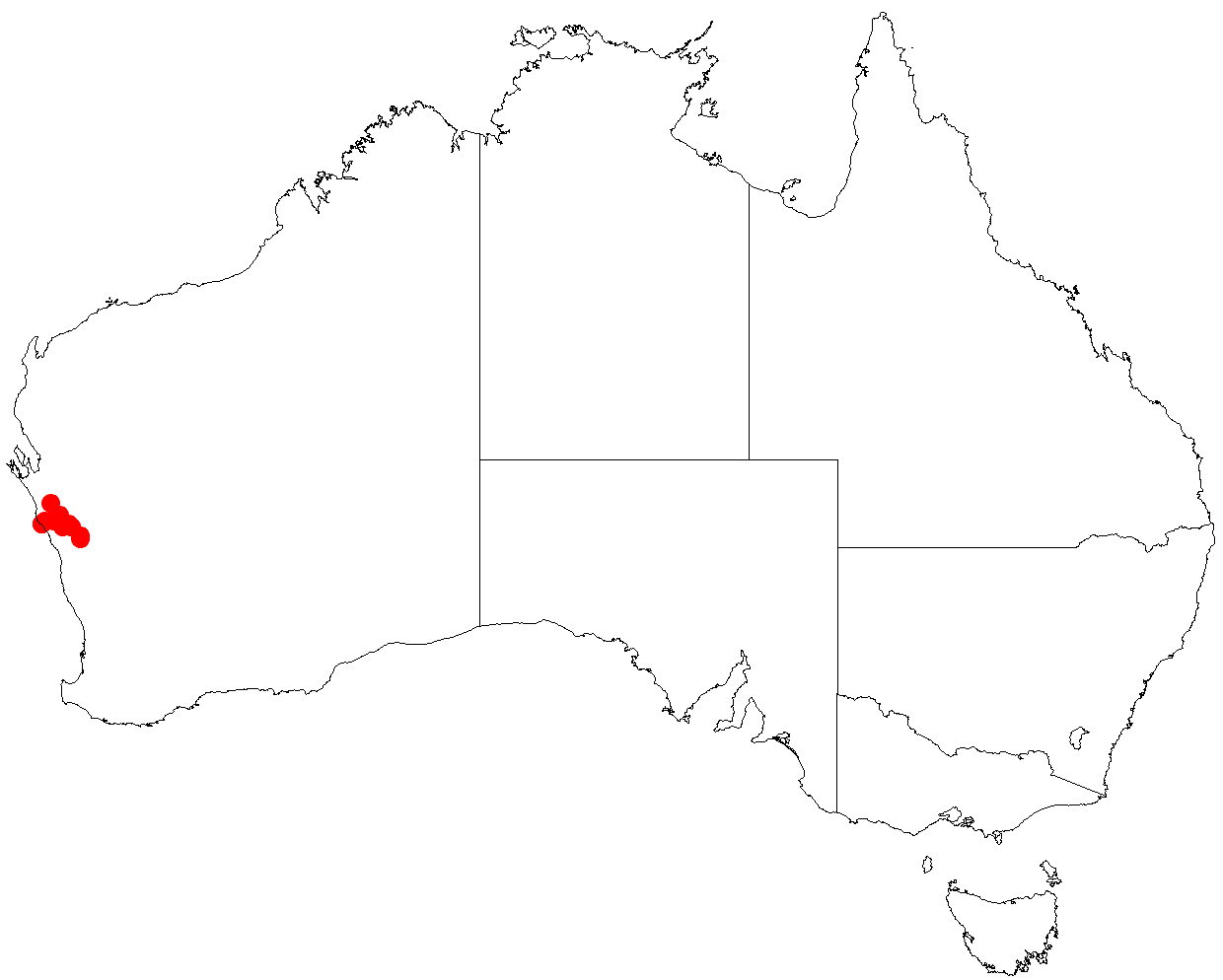
- Occurrence data from AVH

Species of flowering plant

Prostanthera scutata is a species of flowering plant in the family Lamiaceae and is endemic to Western Australia. It is a small, erect, compact shrub with densely hairy branches, elliptic to narrow elliptic leaves and pale blue or faintly violet flowers.

== Description ==
Prostanthera magnifica is an erect, compact shrub that typically grows to a height of 20–30 cm (7.9–11.8 in) and has densely hairy branches. The leaves are elliptic to narrow elliptic, 1.5–11 mm (0.059–0.433 in) long and 1–6 mm (0.039–0.236 in) wide on a petiole 0.5–2 mm (0.020–0.079 in) long. The flowers are arranged in bunches of six to twenty near the ends of branchlets, each flower on a pedicel 1.5–2.5 mm (0.059–0.098 in) long. The sepals are dark greyish green, forming a tube 2.5–4 mm (0.098–0.157 in) long with two egg-shaped to broadly egg-shaped lobes, the lower lobe 2–4.5 mm (0.079–0.177 in) long and 2.5–4.5 mm (0.098–0.177 in) wide, the upper lobe 4–8.5 mm (0.16–0.33 in) long and 4.5–8 mm (0.18–0.31 in) wide. The petals are pale blue to faintly violet, 12–20 mm (0.47–0.79 in) long forming a tube 14–15 mm (0.55–0.59 in) long with two lips. The central lobe of the lower lip is 3.5–5 mm (0.14–0.20 in) long and 3–4.5 mm (0.12–0.18 in) wide and the side lobes 2.5–4.5 mm (0.098–0.177 in) long and 3–4.5 mm (0.12–0.18 in) wide. The upper lip is 2.2–5 mm (0.087–0.197 in) long and 5–8 mm (0.20–0.31 in) wide with a central notch 1–2.5 mm (0.039–0.098 in) deep. Flowering occurs in October, December or January.

== Taxonomy ==
Prostanthera scutata was first formally described in 1964 by Charles Austin Gardner in the Journal of the Royal Society of Western Australia from specimens he collected near the Hutt River.

== Distribution and habitat ==
This mintbush grows in gravelly soil in the Avon Wheatbelt and Geraldton Sandplains biogeographic regions of Western Australia.

== Conservation status ==
This mintbush is classified as "Priority Two" by the Western Australian Government Department of Parks and Wildlife meaning that it is poorly known and from only one or a few locations.
