= Hutt Lagoon =

Marine salt lake near the coast of Western Australia

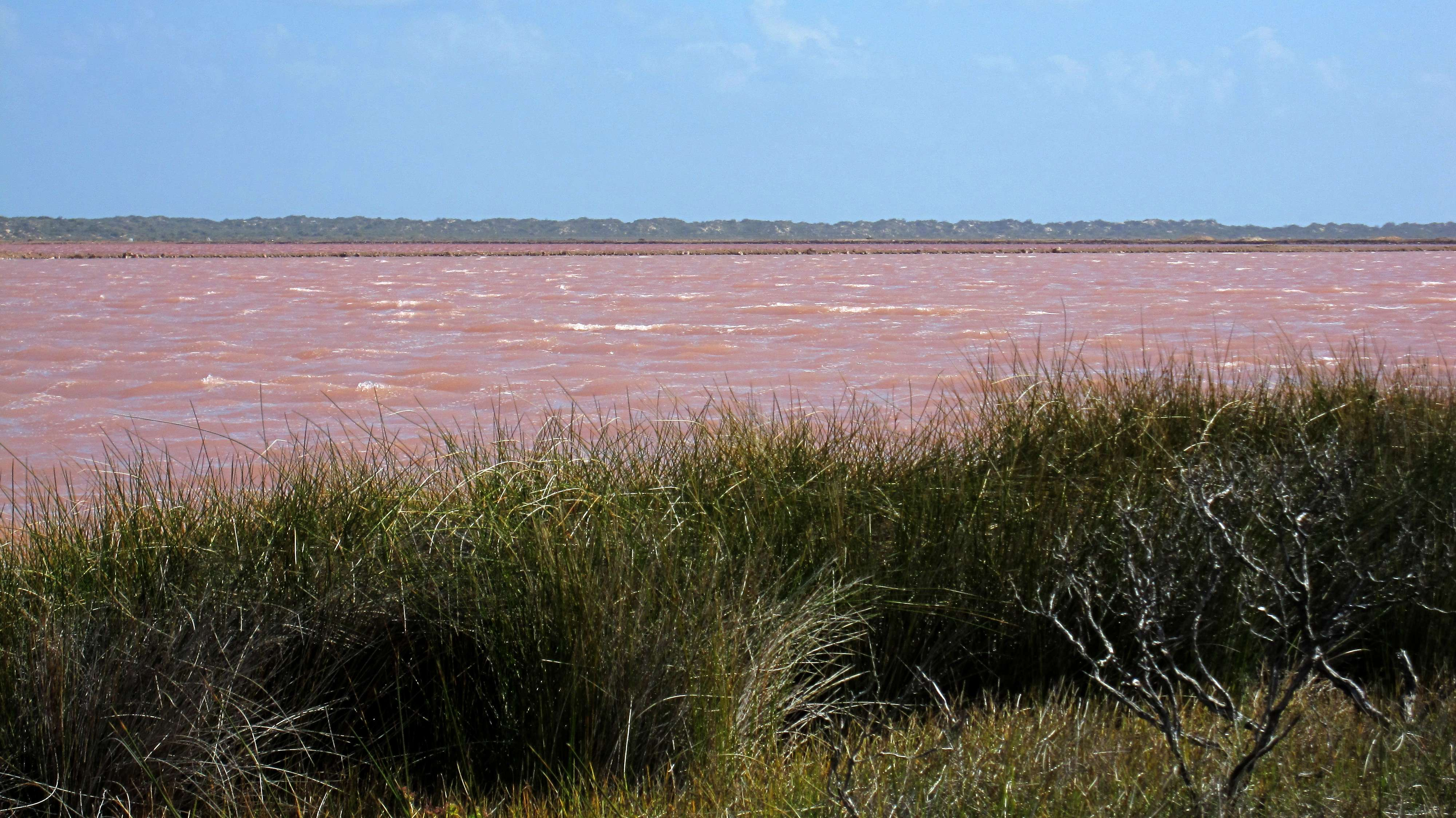
- View of Hutt Lagoon from south east shore

- Location in Western Australia
- Interactive map of Hutt Lagoon
- Location: Mid Western Australia
- Coordinates: 28°08′S 114°13′E
- Type: Marine lake
- Basin countries: Australia
- Max. length: 14 km (8.7 mi)
- Max. width: 2.3 km (1.4 mi)
- Max. depth: 0.65 m (2 ft 2 in)
- Surface elevation: below sea-level

Hutt Lagoon is a marine salt lake located near the Indian Ocean coast 2 kilometres (1.2 mi) north of the mouth of the Hutt River, in the Mid West region of Western Australia.

== Geography ==
Hutt Lagoon is an elongate lake that sits in a dune swale adjacent to the coast. The town of Gregory is located between the ocean and the lake's southern shores. The road between Northampton and Kalbarri, George Grey Drive, runs along its eastern edge.

The lake is about 14 km (9 mi) in length along its northwest-southeast axis, parallel with the coast, and around 2.3 km (1.4 mi) wide.

Hutt Lagoon encompasses most of the Hutt Lagoon System, a DIWA-listed wetland system that also takes in a number of adjacent small lakes, such as Utcha Swamp.

== Hydrology ==
The lagoon, a marginal-marine salina or marine lake, is an elongate depression about 70 square kilometres (27 sq mi) in area, with most of it lying a few metres below sea level. It is separated from the Indian Ocean by a beach barrier ridge and barrier dune system. Similar to Lake MacLeod, 40 kilometres (25 mi) to the north of Carnarvon, Hutt Lagoon is fed by marine waters through the barrier ridge and by meteoric waters through springs.

Due to the salina’s sub-sealevel position, seepage of seawater into the salina is continuous year round. During the winter wet season, the amount of water coming into the salina is substantially increased by the influx of meteoric groundwater. Hutt Lagoon has a Mediterranean climate, with mean annual rainfall of 449 mm (17.7 in) (mainly May to August), and a mean annual evaporation rate of 2,445 mm (96.3 in). These factors combine to form a setting within which salt is deposited seasonally and the rates and style of precipitation follow a balance between influx of water and removal by evaporation. During the summer about 95% of the salina surface is a dry salt flat.

== History ==
Hutt Lagoon was named by the explorer George Grey, who camped on its eastern edge on 4 April 1839 while on his second disastrous expedition along the Western Australian coast. He mistook the wet season lagoon for a large estuary and named "the river and estuary now discovered" after William Hutt, brother of John Hutt, the second Governor of Western Australia. William Hutt was a British Liberal politician who was heavily involved in the colonization of Western Australia, New Zealand and South Australia.

After Grey's arrival back in Perth, John Hutt dispatched the colonial schooner Champion under Captain Dring to investigate the large estuary and river discovered. In summer, January 1840, George Fletcher Moore aboard Champion reported the Hutt River at its mouth to be dry, and could not locate the large estuary described by Grey.

== Resources ==
=== β-carotene ===
Hutt Lagoon is a pink lake, a salt lake with a red or pink hue due to the presence of the carotenoid-producing algae Dunaliella salina, a source of β-carotene, a food-colouring agent and source of vitamin A. The lagoon contains the world's largest microalgae production plant, a 250-hectare (620-acre) series of artificial ponds used to farm Dunaliella salina.

=== Brine shrimp ===
Hutt Lagoon provides a commercial supply of Artemia parthenogenetica brine shrimp. Artemia is a specialty feed used by prawn and fish farmers and the aquarium fish trade.

=== Salt and gypsum ===
In 1854 the explorer Augustus Charles Gregory promoted the quantity and quality of the salt deposits at Hutt Lagoon and their proximity to Port Gregory. He also commended the gypsum deposits on the western shore of the lagoon.

At the 1873 Sydney Intercolonial Exhibition salt from the Hutt Lagoon deposit was highly commended. Hutt Lagoon gypsum received a bronze medal. Hutt Lagoon salt was also exhibited at the 1880 Melbourne Exhibition.

In August 1908 Port Gregory Saltworks consigned its first shipment of salt on SS Venus. Production was seasonal, of the order of 4,000 tons per year and employing up to 50, until the salt operation went into liquidation in 1924.

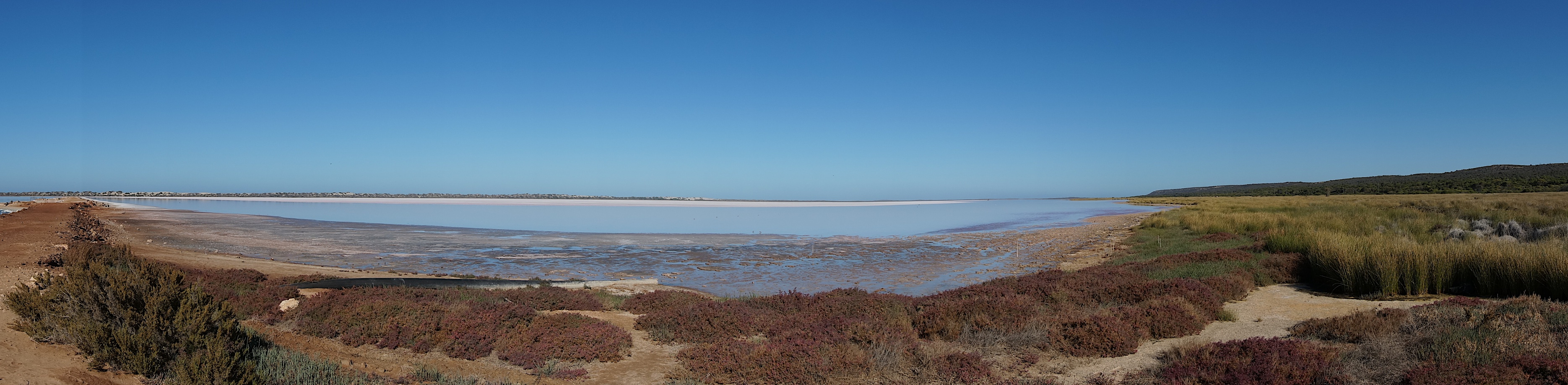
Hutt Lagoon, 2014

== See also ==
- List of lakes of Australia § Western Australia
