= Hutt River (Western Australia) =

Coordinates: 28°13′15″S 114°18′12″E

Location
- Country: Australia

Physical characteristics
- Source
  - location: 23 km (14 mi) north-east of Northampton
  - elevation: 284 m (932 ft)
- Mouth
  - location: Broken Anchor Bay, Indian Ocean
- Length: 60 km (37 mi)
- Basin size: 1,078.43 km^{2} (416.38 sq mi)
- Discharge
  - average: 10,660 ML/a (0.338 m^{3}/s; 11.93 cu ft/s)

Hutt River is a river in the Mid West region of Western Australia.

The river rises 20 kilometres (12 mi) east of the North West Coastal Highway, between Northampton and Binnu. It flows in a westerly direction until reaching Broken Anchor Bay on the Indian Ocean 6 kilometres (4 mi) south-east of Port Gregory. The main tributary for the Hutt River is Kennedy Creek. Others are Yarder Gully and Swamp Gully, which are important contributors of fresh water to the river.

Under normal flow, the Hutt River runs to the north for less than 500 metres (1,600 ft) before breaking through the final dune and flowing to the sea. Under heavy flow it breaks straight through.

Hutt Lagoon, 2 kilometres (1.2 mi) north of the river mouth, is a marginal marine salina. Similar to Lake MacLeod, north of Carnarvon, Hutt Lagoon is fed by marine waters through a barrier ridge and by meteoric waters through springs. Due to the salina's below-sea-level position, seepage of seawater into the salina is continuous year round.

== History ==
The first European to discover the river was probably Francisco Pelsaert, who hove to in Broken Anchor Bay at the mouth of the Hutt River on 9 June 1629, following the sinking of Batavia on the Houtman Abrolhos. He probably returned to the mouth of the Hutt River in Sardam on 16 November 1629. His crew explored the area, and two mutineers, Wouter Loos and Jan Pelgrom de Bye, appear to have been abandoned here, becoming Australia's first European residents.

The first British explorer to encounter Hutt River was Lieutenant George Grey on 5 April 1839, naming the river after his friend William Hutt. Hutt was a British Liberal politician who was heavily involved in the colonization of Western Australia, New Zealand and South Australia, and the brother of John Hutt, the second Governor of Western Australia. Hutt was for a time chairman of the Western Australian Land Company. The next day, Grey named the nearby Bowes River after Hutt's wife, Mary Bowes.

The Principality of Hutt River was a micronation located midway along the river. The Principality covered an area of 18,500 acres (75 km^{2}) and claimed to be an independent sovereign state that seceded from Australia in 1970 as a result of a dispute over wheat production quotas. It was not recognised by the Australian state or federal governments, or any other country. It dissolved in August 2020.
