= Burringurrah Aboriginal Community =

Community in Western Australia

Burringurrah
- Town
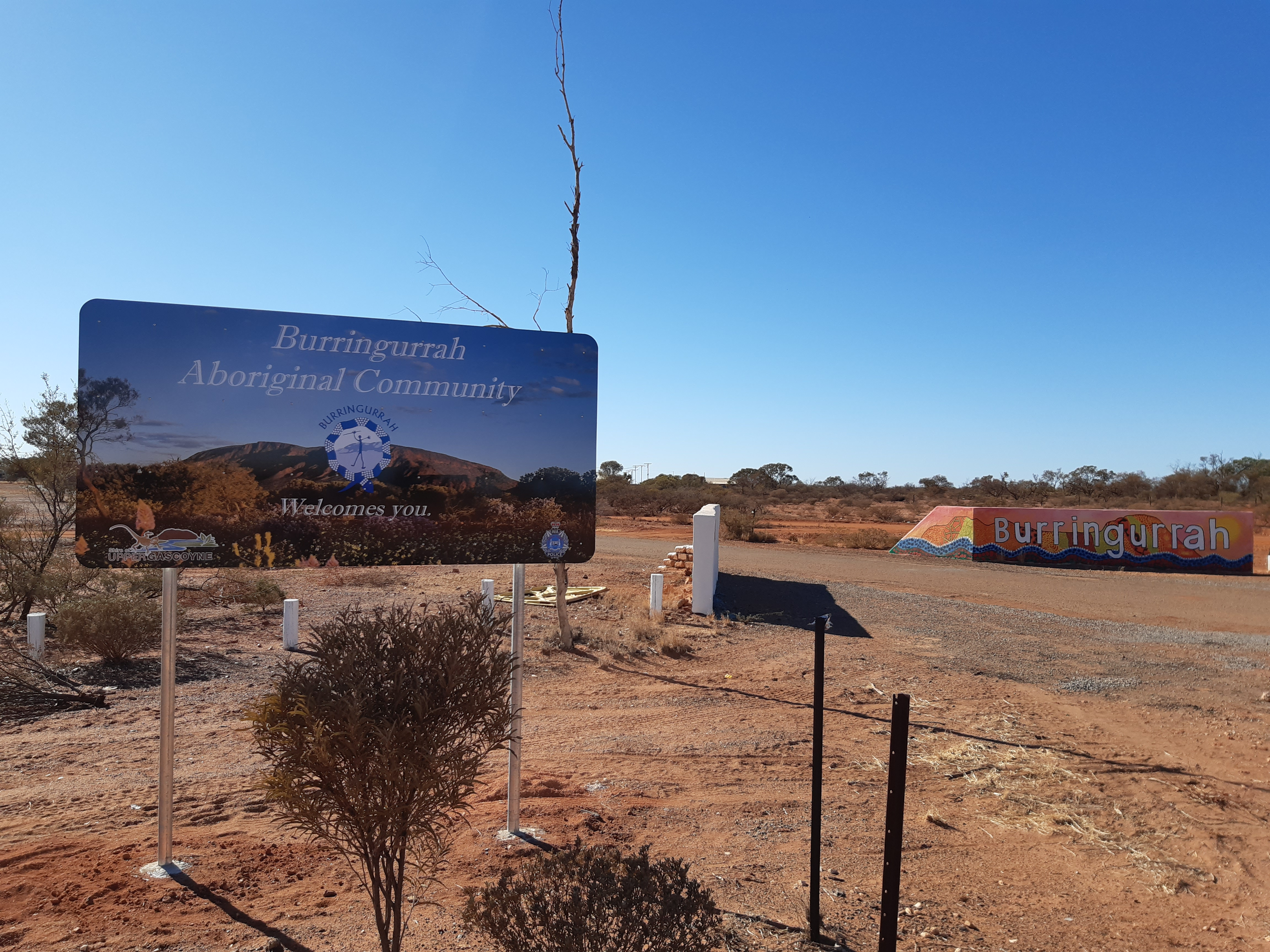
- Burringurrah Aboriginal Community welcome sign

- Interactive map of Burringurrah
- Coordinates: 24.65045°0′S 116.93304°0′E
- Country: Australia
- State: Western Australia
- LGA: Shire of Upper Gascoyne
- Location: 443 km (275 mi) E of Carnarvon; 303 km (188 mi) NW of Meekatharra; 269 km (167 mi) E of Gascoyne Junction

Government
  - State electorate: North West
  - Federal division: Durack

Population
  - Total: 70 (ILOC 2021)
- Postcode: 6705

Burringurrah (also referred to as Mt Augustus) is a medium-sized Aboriginal community, located in the Gascoyne region of Western Australia, within the Shire of Upper Gascoyne. In the 2011 census, Burringurrah had a total population of 117, including 102 Aboriginal and Torres Strait Islander people. The 2021 census recorded 70 Aboriginal/Torres Strait Islander people in the area. The inselberg also once known as Mount Augustus is situated nearby.

== History ==
The community is situated on a 45,000-hectare (110,000-acre) reserve that was excised from the Mount James pastoral lease. It was incorporated in 1999.

The community store had to close in 2011 saying that the transient population made the business non-viable. The remote CMS had taken over the store in 2009 and had kept it running until April 2011 despite closing for a short while from seasonal flooding.

The 2011 floods had isolated the community for a few weeks and it was not until nearly a year later, in early 2012, that all basic services were returned to the town. The community store re-opened in 2025. before its re-opening, many residents traveled to Carnarvon, ten hours' drive away, for grocery shopping, as the much closer small corner shop near Mount Augustus National Park was prohibitively expensive. This caused issues with school attendance, as parents would take their children to Carnarvon for weeks at a time. It also caused malnutrition (especially scurvy and boils), as the lack of available grocery stores meant that the primary form of subsistance was hunting, predominantly meat-based, as foraging for seeds and bush tucker is much more labour-intensive.

== Native title ==
The community is located within the registered area of the Wajarri Yamatji (WAD6033/98) native title claim.

== Governance ==
The community is managed through its incorporated body, Burringurrah Community (Aboriginal Corporation), incorporated under the Aboriginal Councils and Associations Act 1976 on 9 September 1987.

== Town planning ==
Burringurrah Layout Plan No.2 has been prepared in accordance with State Planning Policy 3.2 Aboriginal Settlements. Layout Plan No.2 was endorsed by the community on 16 February 1999 and the Western Australian Planning Commission WAPC on 21 October 2003. The Layout Plan map-set and background report can be viewed at Planning Western Australia's website.
