= Shelling of Port Gregory =

Coordinates: 28°11′23″S 114°15′02″E

- Part of the Battle for Australia during World War II
Date	28 January 1943
Location	Port Gregory, Western Australia, Australia
Result	Japanese operational failure. Artillery fire directed at incorrect location; no damage caused.

Belligerents
Empire of Japan	Australia

Commanders and leaders
(Empire of Japan) Lieutenant Commander Tatenosuke Tosu	—

Strength
(Empire of Japan) One submarine (I-165)	(Australia) Two RAN Coastwatchers

Casualties and losses
None	None

The shelling of Port Gregory took place on 28 January 1943 during World War II. The attack was conducted by the Japanese submarine I-165, under the command of Lieutenant Commander Tatenosuke Tosu, as a part of attempts to divert Allied attention away from the evacuation of Japanese forces from Guadalcanal, in the Solomon Islands. None of the 10 shells fired at Port Gregory, Western Australia caused any damage. The attack was not noticed by the Allied naval authorities until a radio signal sent by Tosu was intercepted and decoded a week later.

It is likely that Geraldton, about 120 kilometres (75 mi) south-southwest of Pt Gregory, was the original target of the bombardment. Geraldton, a major regional port, was also a Allied military base, whereas Pt Gregory had no military role whatsoever.

== Purpose ==
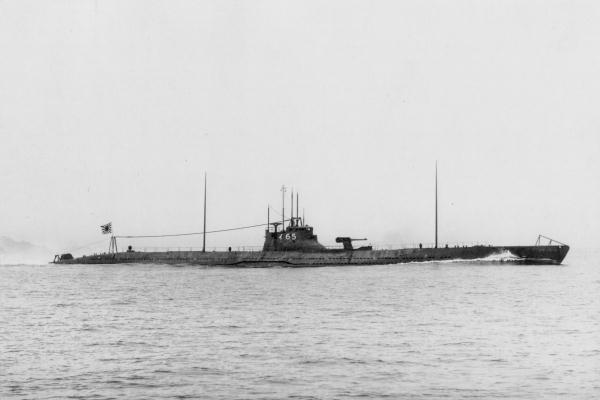
I-165 in 1932.

During the Pacific War Japanese submarines occasionally operated off Western Australia. In early 1943, the major Japanese headquarters directed their forces to make small attacks on Allied positions, in an attempt to divert attention away from the planned evacuation of Guadalcanal, Operation Ke. In mid-January, the commander of the Japanese Southwest Area Fleet ordered I-165 to attack Allied shipping off north-western Australia. As part of the fleet's contribution to diversionary operations, I-165 was also directed to bombard a coastal Australian town.

I-165 sailed from Surabaya in the occupied Dutch East Indies on 21 January 1943. (Another Japanese submarine, I-166, was ordered to conduct a similar mission against the Cocos Islands.)

== The attack ==
On the evening of 27 January, I-165, arrived just north of Geraldton. While preparing for the attack, the crew of I-165 sighted three aircraft and a surface vessel that Tosu believed was a destroyer. Consequently, Tosu decided to postpone the bombardment, and to withdraw further north, temporarily. While running on the surface, the submarine passed within 3.2 kilometres (2 miles) of what was identified as a destroyer, without being noticed.

The following evening, just after midnight, I-165 surfaced 6,400 metres (4 miles) off Port Gregory. From a range of 7,000 metres (7,700 yd; 4.3 mi), her crew fired about 10 rounds from the submarine's 100 mm (3.9-inch) Type 88 deck gun, at a derelict crayfish cannery, which they had misidentified as an ammunition factory. None of the shells caused any damage. Tosu did not attempt to observe the results of the bombardment, and resumed patrolling off the coast of Western Australia.

Two Australian coastwatchers stationed near Port Gregory noticed gunfire at night on 28 January, but neither observed any shells landing. Allied naval authorities only learned of the attack when the submarine's battle report radio signal was intercepted and decoded a week later. I-165 returned to Surabaya on 16 February without having sunk any Allied ships during her patrol.

Australian naval historian David Stevens noted that, in terms of its objective as a diversion, the bombardment was "an abject failure". Within Allied naval circles, it was regarded as a "graphic example of the poor planning and inadequate doctrine so common in the Japanese submarine force".

The attack on Port Gregory was one of three submarine shellings on Australian towns and cities, the other two being the attacks on Newcastle and Sydney in June 1942.
