= Marine lake =

Type of lake

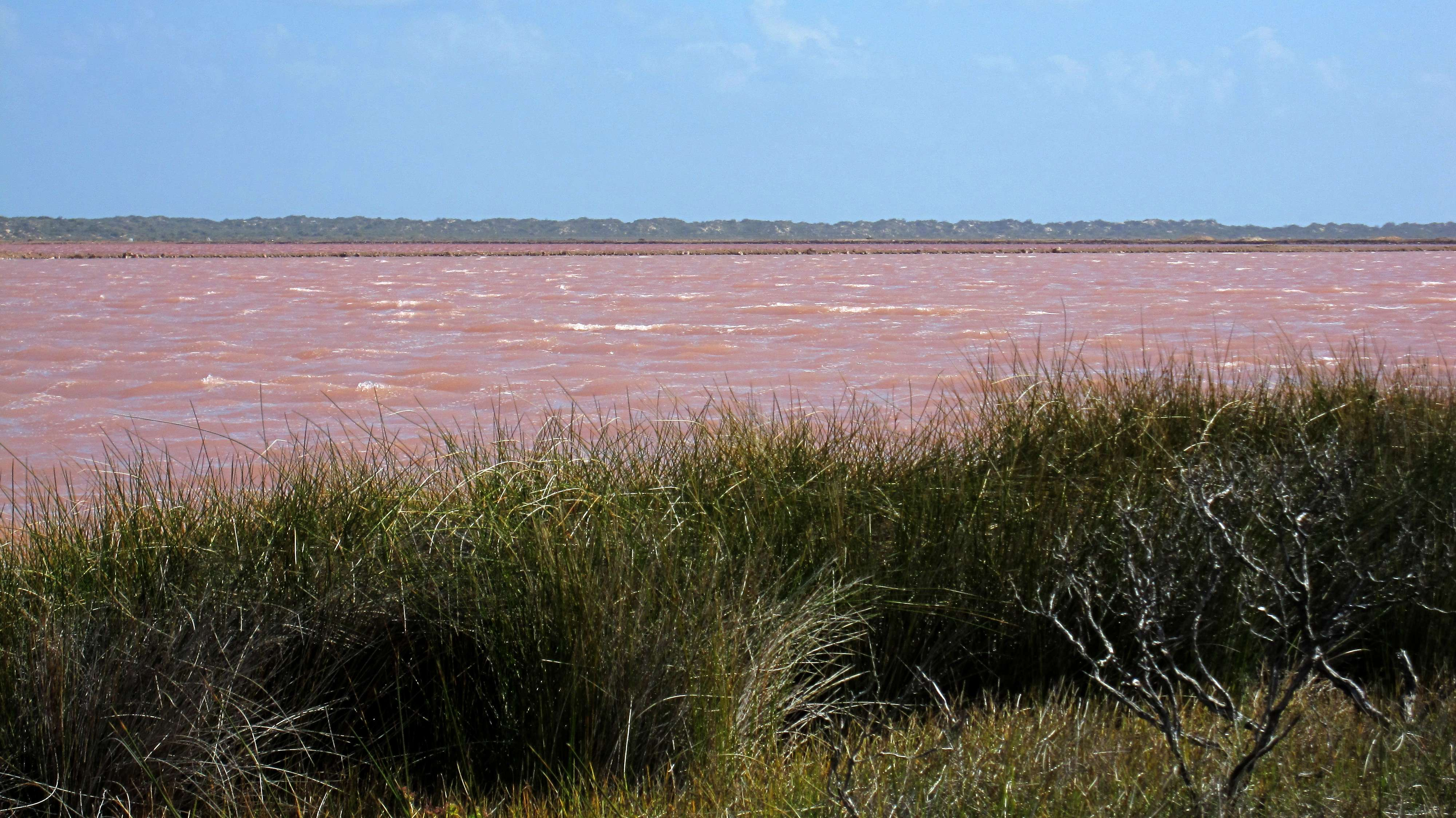
Hutt Lagoon, Australia

A marine lake is a lake situated very close to the sea, which has a connection to this sea, via tunnels or cracks in the soil. Marine lakes are fed with seawater but are usually also fed with rainwater, meaning that the salt content of the water is usually lower. The measure of salt greatly depends on the size of the tunnel or crack connecting it to the sea.

Due to the specific level of salt in the water, and the fact that the lakes are so secluded, marine lakes house a large amount of unique species, often found nowhere else on the planet. Destruction of one such lake means that many species can become extinct with it.

== Lakes around the world ==
There are about 200 known marine lakes. Most of these are located in Vietnam, Palau, and Indonesia. A notable marine lake is Ongeim’l Tketau, in Palau, known for its vast numbers of jellyfish, to which it owes its nickname, Jellyfish Lake.

== Threats ==
Marine lakes are vulnerable to threats from human activities and climate change. Common threats are:

- introduction of non-endemic species
- uncontrolled development of tourism
- use as fishponds to store recent catch or to cultivate captured fish
- use as public toilets

== See also ==
- Biodiversity hotspot
