= Gregory, Western Australia =

Gregory
- Town
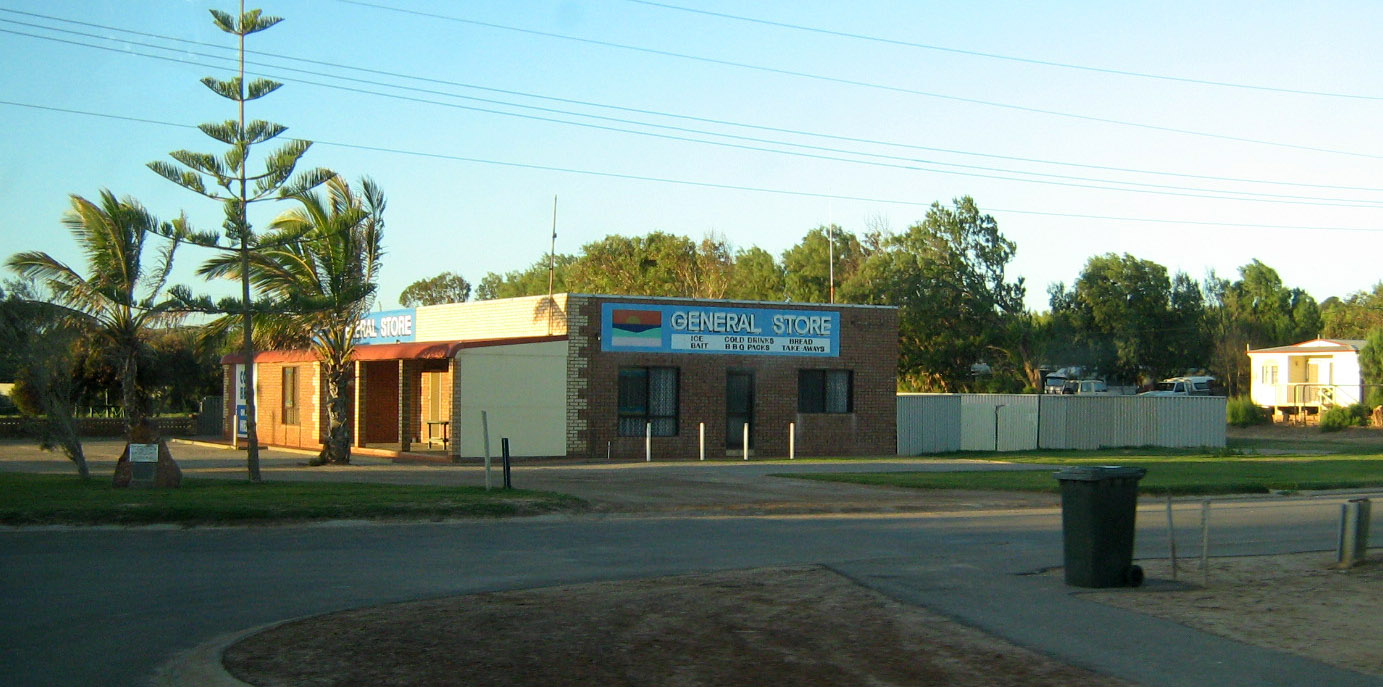
- Port Gregory general store

- Interactive map of Gregory
- Coordinates: 28°11′17″S 114°15′04″E
- Country: Australia
- State: Western Australia
- LGA: Shire of Northampton
- Location: 520 km (320 mi) N of Perth; 54 km (34 mi) SE of Kalbarri; 41 km (25 mi) NW of Northampton
- Established: 1853

Government
  - State electorate: Moore
  - Federal division: Durack

Area
  - Total: 3 km^{2} (1.2 sq mi)
- Elevation: 6 m (20 ft)

Population
  - Total: 53 (SAL 2021)
- Postcode: 6535

Gregory, previously known as Port Gregory and Pakington, is a small town and port located 7 km (4.3 mi) northwest of the mouth of the Hutt River, in the Mid West region of Western Australia. At the 2016 census, Gregory had a population of 64 in 83 dwellings. Most of the dwellings are holiday houses. The population of Gregory fluctuates depending on tourism; with the town at full capacity during school holidays and throughout the summer. During the census (Tuesday 9 August 2016) 50% of dwellings were unoccupied (national average 11%).

The first European to visit the site of Gregory was the explorer George Grey, who camped on the eastern edge of Hutt Lagoon on 4 April 1839 while on his second disastrous expedition along the Western Australian coast.

Port Gregory, formerly called Boat Harbour, was established in 1849 and named after brothers Augustus and Frank Gregory, two of Western Australia's most active explorers. In May 1853 sixty convicts and Pensioner Guards arrived from England via Fremantle in the brigantine Leander and the cutter Gold Digger.

The townsite was gazetted in 1853, as Pakington; at or about the same time, Lynton 8 km (5 mi) to the south-west, on the Hutt River, was gazetted as a townsite, including the convict depot and facilities for the guards, other staff and their families. The convicts were used for Government works and in establishing a road to the Murchison River and the Geraldine Lead Mine, operated from 1849 to 1875. Ticket-of-leave men from the depot were hired out for work at the port and on nearby farms and stations.

A major employer was Captain William Ayshford Sanford who, as magistrate for the region and the Superintendent of Convicts, built an impressive homestead alongside Lynton. He resigned in 1854 and took up pastoral and whaling pursuits, establishing a whaling facility just north of the Pakington townsite. John Bateman and others also established whaling facilities nearby. The name Pakington was rarely used however and the name Port Gregory, the harbour located next to the town, was more generally accepted. Initially the port was used by whalers and pastoralists and to ship lead ore and pig lead from the mines, notably the Geraldine mine. Salt from nearby Hutt Lagoon was shipped until the depression when the port and both the 'towns' became deserted.

On 27 January 1943 the Japanese submarine I-165, while planning to bombard the nearby port of Geraldton, observed three aircraft and what was believed to be a destroyer and aborted the attack. On the following night the submarine bombarded Port Gregory with about ten 100-mm (3.9-inch) shells from her deck gun, in the belief that a crayfish cannery was an ammunition factory. There was no damage and Port Gregory was at the time deserted. Naval authorities only learned of the attack when the submarine's battle report radio signal was intercepted and decoded a week later.

There are many shipwrecks in the vicinity, most caused by the unsuitability of the port for large vessels. These include trading and whaling vessels and the screw steamer SS Xantho, which sank while loaded with lead ore from the Geraldine mine.

The town changed its name to Gregory in 1967.

== Climate ==
Gregory lies in the warm-summer Mediterranean climate zone (Köppen: Csa). Winters are warm with moderate precipitation, and summers are hot and dry.
