= One Mile Jetty =

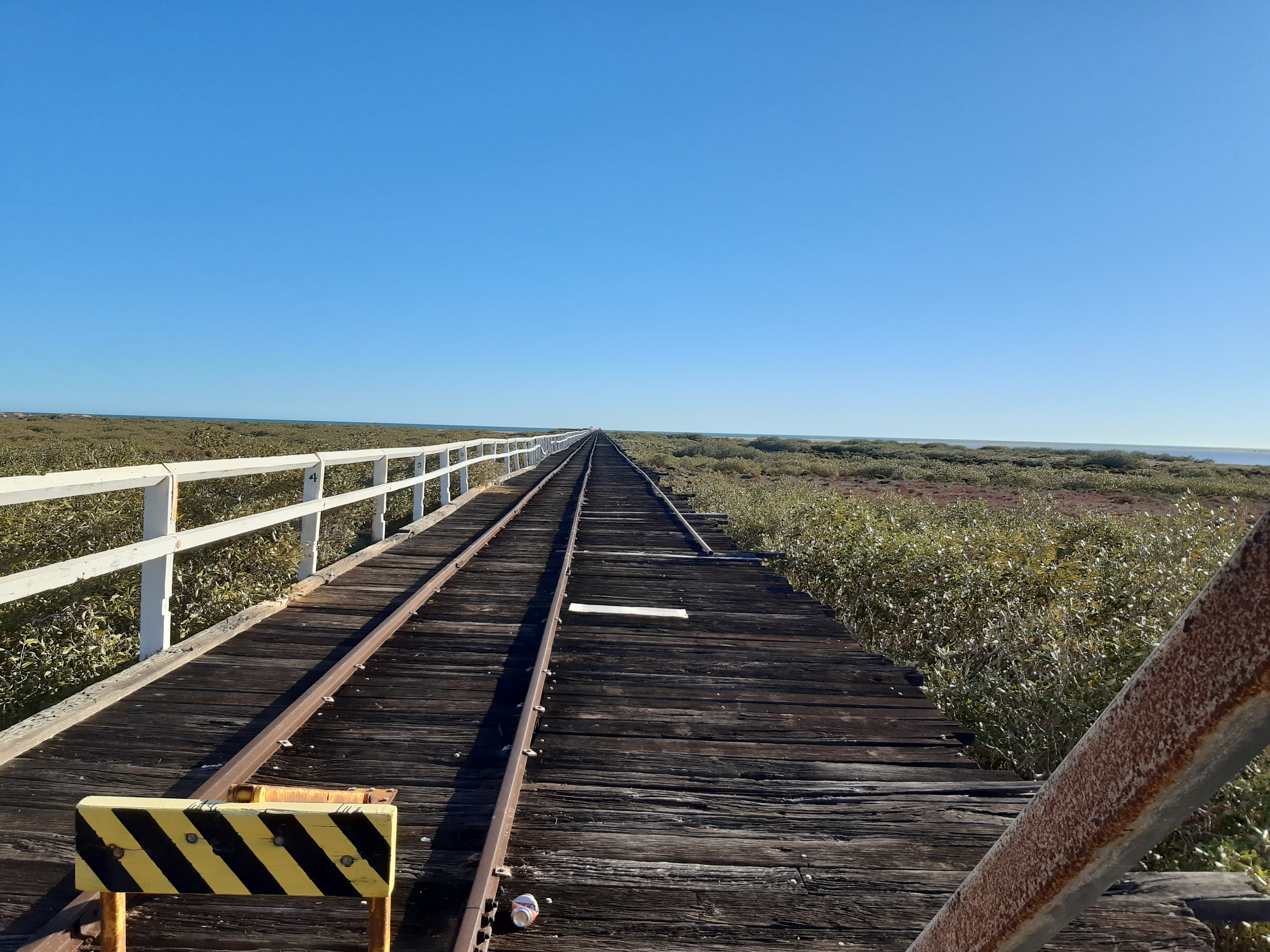
- One Mile Jetty in July 2020
- Interactive map of the One Mile Jetty area

General information
- Type: Jetty
- Location: Carnarvon, Western Australia
- Coordinates: 24°52′37″S 113°37′37″E
- Completed: 1898

Website
- onemilejettyprecinct.com.au

One Mile Jetty is a jetty in Carnarvon, Western Australia.

== History ==
One Mile Jetty was completed in 1898 by the Public Works Department in Carnarvon, Western Australia. It was extended in 1900, 1904, 1912, 1937 and 1959. In 2017 it was declared unsafe and closed to the public.

In April 2021, part of the jetty was damaged by Cyclone Seroja. In 2026 work began to restore 200 metres of the jetty.
