= Carnarvon, Western Australia =

Carnarvon Kuwinywardu (Yinggarda)
- Town
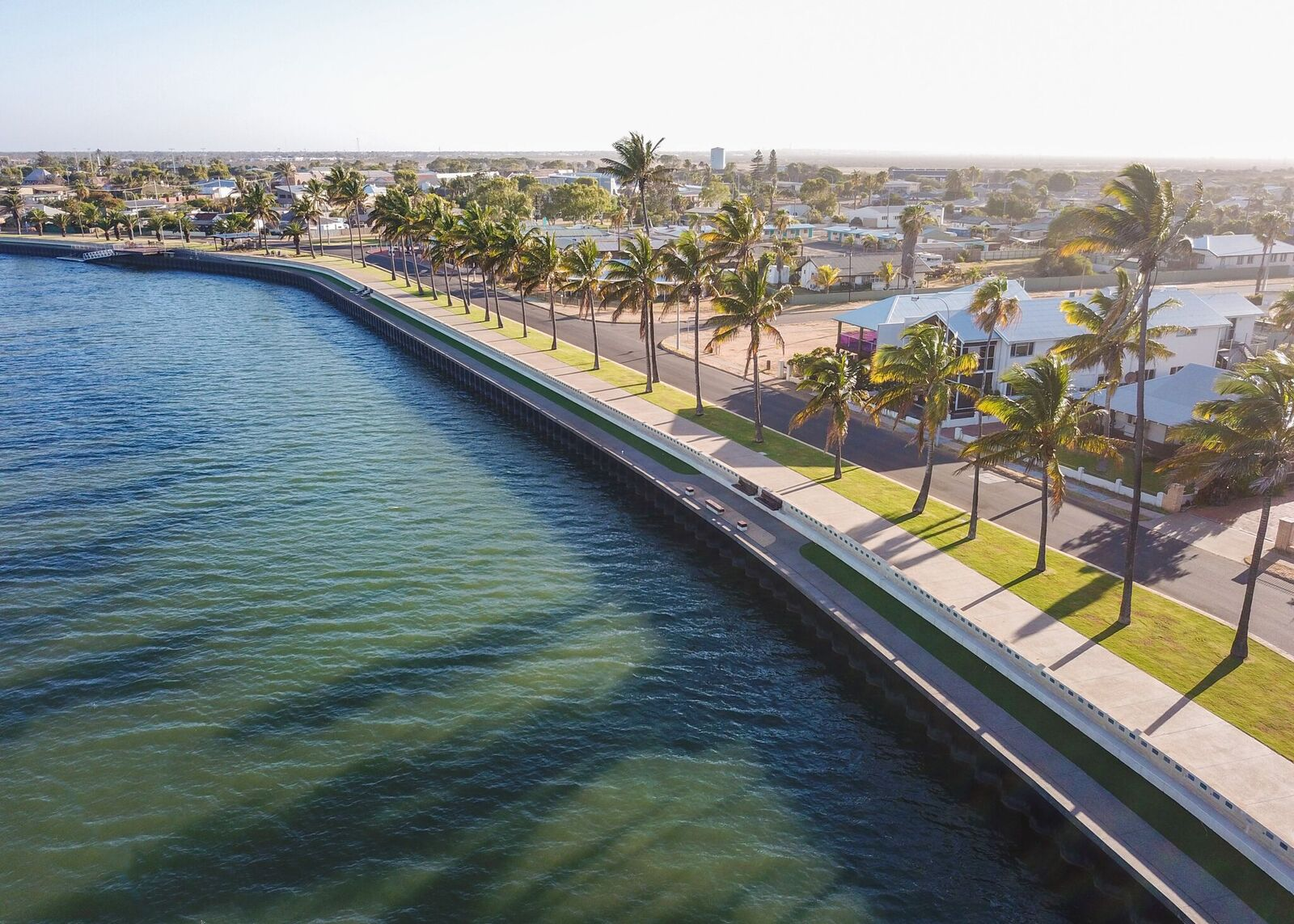
- The Carnarvon Fascine boardwalk

- Coordinates: 24°53′2″S 113°39′25″E
- Country: Australia
- State: Western Australia
- LGA: Shire of Carnarvon
- Location: 906 km (563 mi) NW of Perth; 477 km (296 mi) N of Geraldton; 646 km (401 mi) SW of Karratha
- Established: 1883

Government
  - State electorate: Mid-West
  - Federal division: Durack
- Elevation: 4 m (13 ft)

Population
  - Total: 4,879 (2021 census)
- Postcode: 6701
- Mean max temp: 27.8 °C (82.0 °F)
- Mean min temp: 17.3 °C (63.1 °F)
- Annual rainfall: 209.4 mm (8.24 in)

Carnarvon (/kərˈnɑːrvən/ kər-NAR-vən) is a coastal town situated approximately 900 kilometres (560 mi) north of Perth, in Western Australia. It lies at the mouth of the Gascoyne River on the Indian Ocean. The Shark Bay world heritage area lies to the south of the town and the Ningaloo Reef and the tourist town of Exmouth lie to the north. Mungullah Aboriginal Community was formerly in the town however it has moved east of the town.

Inland, Carnarvon has strong links with the town of Gascoyne Junction and the Burringurrah Community. At the 2021 census, Carnarvon had a population of 4,879.

== History ==
The Inggarda people are the traditional owners of the region around Carnarvon. Before European settlement the place now called Carnarvon, located at the mouth of the Gascoyne River, was known as Kuwinywardu which means 'neck of water'. Indigenous Australians associating with the Carnarvon area typically associate as being Yamatji, traditionally speaking the Wajarri language.

The town was founded in 1883, initially as a port and supply centre for the surrounding region, and is the administrative centre for the Shire of Carnarvon. The town site was officially gazetted on 4 June 1891, named after Henry Herbert, 4th Earl of Carnarvon, a past Secretary of State for the Colonies.

=== One Mile Jetty ===
One Mile Jetty was built in the late 1890s and had reached its maximum length in 1904. In 2021, it was destroyed by Cyclone Seroja.

=== Carnarvon Tram ===
Carnarvon has had three tramways.

- The first, shown on a Public Works Department map of 1884, ran from a landing site on the river, across Olivia Terrace to a shed on the other side of the road – a very short tramway indeed. The trolley used on this tramway was supposed to be hand powered, using a lever attached to crank on two of the wheels. However, there is a reference to the use of wind-power.
- The second tramway, constructed between 1886 and 1887, ran west from Olivia Terrace in a straight line to the jetty, which was halfway between Mangrove Point and Conspicuous Clump. It was horse drawn.
- The third, and partially remaining, tramway was completed on 9 November 1900. It runs from the townsite, across Babbage Island to the deep-sea jetty. It was constructed with a rail gauge of 610 millimetres (2 ft). It was 3.3 kilometres (2.06 mi) long. Due to the heavy loads of wool being carried on what was a very light railway, it was decided to convert the tramway to 1,070-millimetre (3 ft 6 in) gauge in 1908–09. This tramway was worked with a steam locomotive. The tramway ceased operation in December 1965.

The Carnarvon Light Railway Association operated trains along restored tracks on the jetty; however, due to unsafe conditions the jetty was closed to the public. In 2021 it was destroyed by Cyclone Seroja.

=== Aerospace ===
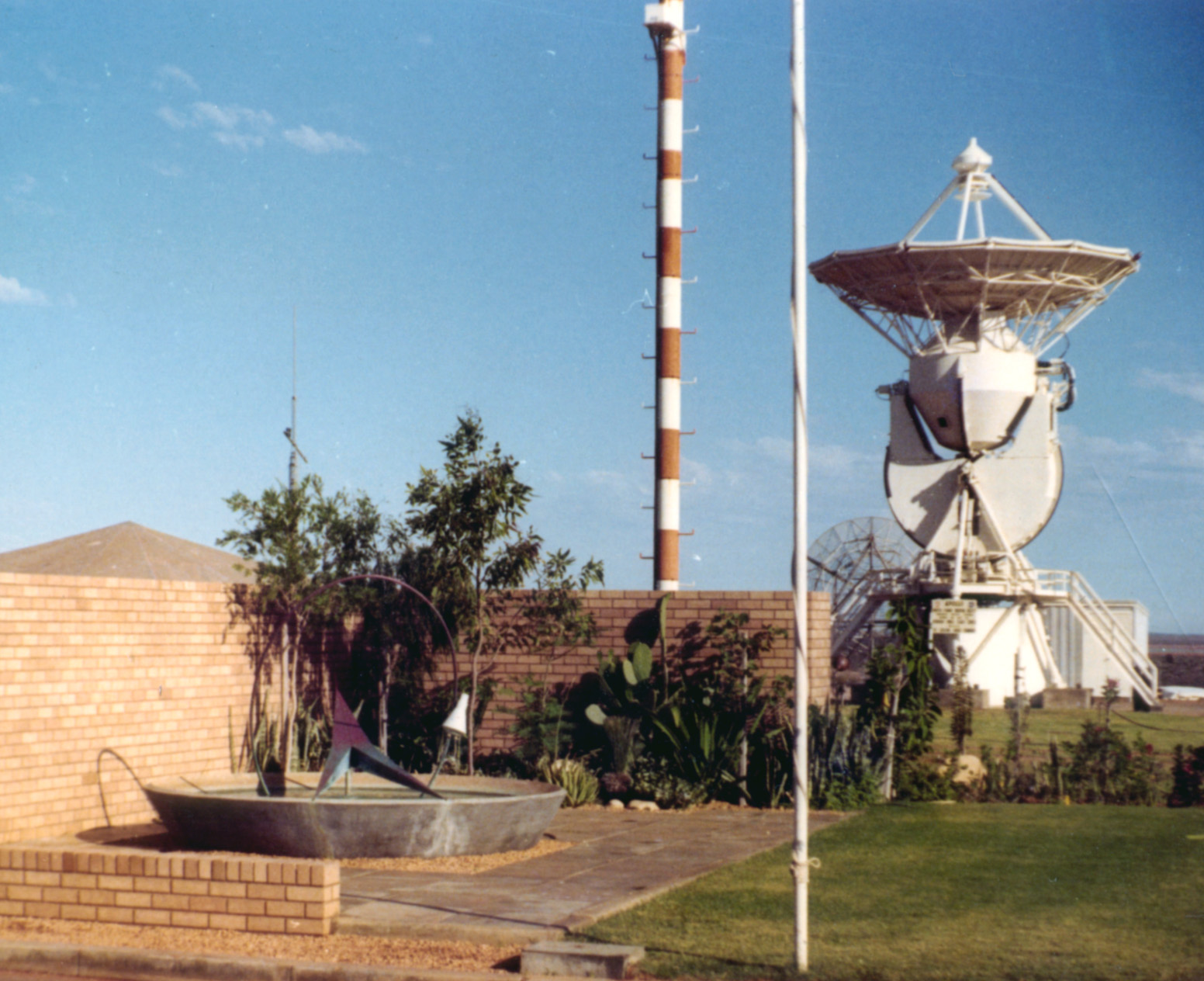
NASA Tracking Station c. 1969

From 1964 to 1965, 12 sounding rockets were launched from Carnarvon to a maximum altitude of 120 kilometres (75 mi).

During the 1960s, NASA set up a tracking station nearby to support the Gemini and Apollo space programs. The tracking station was closed in the mid-1970s. Only the foundations of the historical site remain. The site is adjacent to the OTC Satellite Earth Station Carnarvon.

=== Korean Star ===
On 20 May 1988, the bulk carrier Korean Star ran aground in bad weather near Cape Cuvier, within the port limits of Carnarvon. Around 600 tonnes (1.3 million pounds) of fuel oil were spilled into the ocean. Damage was limited to 10 kilometres (6 mi) of remote beaches and coastline. The ship was not salvaged and left grounded; however, very little of the wreck remains to be seen.

== Economy ==
Main economic activities of the Gascoyne region include:

- mining, at a salt mine on nearby Lake Macleod and at inland mines
- fishing (major focus is a prawn fishery)
- tourism
- agriculture, including cattle, goats, sheep and wool, and horticulture, the major industry of the area. A range of products are grown along the Gascoyne River, particularly bananas (mainly Cavendish bananas) and tomatoes, as well as grapefruit, mangoes and table grapes. Climatic advantages enable the growers to meet out of season demand both locally and in export markets.

Radio Australia had a shortwave relay station (built during the 1970s) that used to relay programming to Europe, South Asia and Southeast Asia.

== Education ==
There are five schools in the town; one Catholic, three Western Australia Department of Education schools and one independent. These are St Mary's Star of the Sea Catholic School, which was built in 1906, Carnarvon Community College (formerly Carnarvon Primary School, East Carnarvon Primary School, and Carnarvon Senior High School), Carnarvon School of the Air and Carnarvon Christian School.

== Transport ==
Air travel is served by Carnarvon Airport which provides daily direct flights to Perth that are operated by Rex Airlines.

The town is along the North West Coastal Highway that links between Geraldton and Port Hedland.

== Climate ==
Carnarvon has a hot desert climate (BWh). Average yearly rainfall is 210 millimetres (8.27 in) with the rainiest months (and the most reliable rainfall) being between May and July as the northern edges of winter cold fronts brush the region. Occasional tropical cyclones affect Carnarvon during the summer months bringing heavy rain and strong winds. Apart from this erratic source of rainfall summers are normally dry. Temperatures range from an average maximum of 33 °C (91 °F) in February to 23 °C (73 °F) in July. Average minimums are 23 °C (73 °F) and 11 °C (52 °F) respectively. On 18 February 2024, Carnarvon recorded its highest ever temperature of 49.9 °C (121.8 °F). The town is extremely sunny, having 211.0 clear days annually.

Climate data for Carnarvon (1991–2020, extremes 1945–present)
| Month | Jan | Feb | Mar | Apr | May | Jun | Jul | Aug | Sep | Oct | Nov | Dec | Year |
|---|---|---|---|---|---|---|---|---|---|---|---|---|---|
| Record high °C (°F) | 47.9 (118.2) | 49.9 (121.8) | 47.8 (118.0) | 41.1 (106.0) | 38.2 (100.8) | 32.2 (90.0) | 32.5 (90.5) | 33.6 (92.5) | 38.8 (101.8) | 43.9 (111.0) | 43.4 (110.1) | 45.6 (114.1) | 49.9 (121.8) |
| Mean daily maximum °C (°F) | 31.7 (89.1) | 32.5 (90.5) | 32.1 (89.8) | 29.8 (85.6) | 27.1 (80.8) | 24.0 (75.2) | 23.1 (73.6) | 23.8 (74.8) | 24.8 (76.6) | 26.6 (79.9) | 28.4 (83.1) | 30.1 (86.2) | 27.8 (82.0) |
| Daily mean °C (°F) | 27.3 (81.1) | 28.1 (82.6) | 27.3 (81.1) | 24.6 (76.3) | 21.0 (69.8) | 18.0 (64.4) | 17.0 (62.6) | 17.7 (63.9) | 19.4 (66.9) | 21.7 (71.1) | 23.7 (74.7) | 25.6 (78.1) | 22.6 (72.7) |
| Mean daily minimum °C (°F) | 22.8 (73.0) | 23.6 (74.5) | 22.4 (72.3) | 19.4 (66.9) | 14.8 (58.6) | 12.0 (53.6) | 10.8 (51.4) | 11.6 (52.9) | 13.9 (57.0) | 16.7 (62.1) | 19.0 (66.2) | 21.1 (70.0) | 17.3 (63.1) |
| Record low °C (°F) | 15.9 (60.6) | 15.6 (60.1) | 13.2 (55.8) | 8.9 (48.0) | 6.1 (43.0) | 3.6 (38.5) | 2.4 (36.3) | 3.4 (38.1) | 5.9 (42.6) | 8.1 (46.6) | 10.7 (51.3) | 14.0 (57.2) | 2.4 (36.3) |
| Average precipitation mm (inches) | 7.9 (0.31) | 17.2 (0.68) | 19.1 (0.75) | 15.4 (0.61) | 23.8 (0.94) | 42.5 (1.67) | 41.9 (1.65) | 16.4 (0.65) | 7.4 (0.29) | 3.0 (0.12) | 2.6 (0.10) | 12.3 (0.48) | 209.4 (8.24) |
| Average precipitation days (≥ 1 mm) | 1.2 | 1.6 | 1.3 | 1.5 | 2.4 | 5.0 | 3.8 | 3.0 | 1.7 | 0.8 | 0.6 | 0.4 | 23.3 |
| Average relative humidity (%) (at 15:00) | 57 | 58 | 55 | 55 | 51 | 49 | 50 | 48 | 50 | 50 | 52 | 55 | 53 |
| Average dew point °C (°F) | 19.5 (67.1) | 20.4 (68.7) | 18.8 (65.8) | 16.8 (62.2) | 13.1 (55.6) | 9.9 (49.8) | 9.4 (48.9) | 9.5 (49.1) | 11.0 (51.8) | 13.0 (55.4) | 14.9 (58.8) | 17.5 (63.5) | 14.5 (58.1) |
Source: Bureau of Meteorology: Carnarvon Airport

== Notable people ==
- Andrew Broad, Australian politician
- Troy Cook, Australian rules footballer (Sydney Swans, Fremantle Dockers)
- Craig Fong, actor
- Shelley Gare, journalist and author
- Daniel Johnson, basketball player (Melbourne Tigers, Adelaide 36ers)
- Michael Mitchell, Australian rules footballer (Richmond Tigers)
- Keith Murdoch, New Zealand Rugby union player (All Blacks, Otago), spent his final years in Carnarvon
- Cleo Smith, 2021 missing person (aged four at the time)
- Tom Vandeleur, Australian rules footballer (Fremantle Dockers rookie)
- Jay Watson, Australian musician (Tame Impala, Pond)
