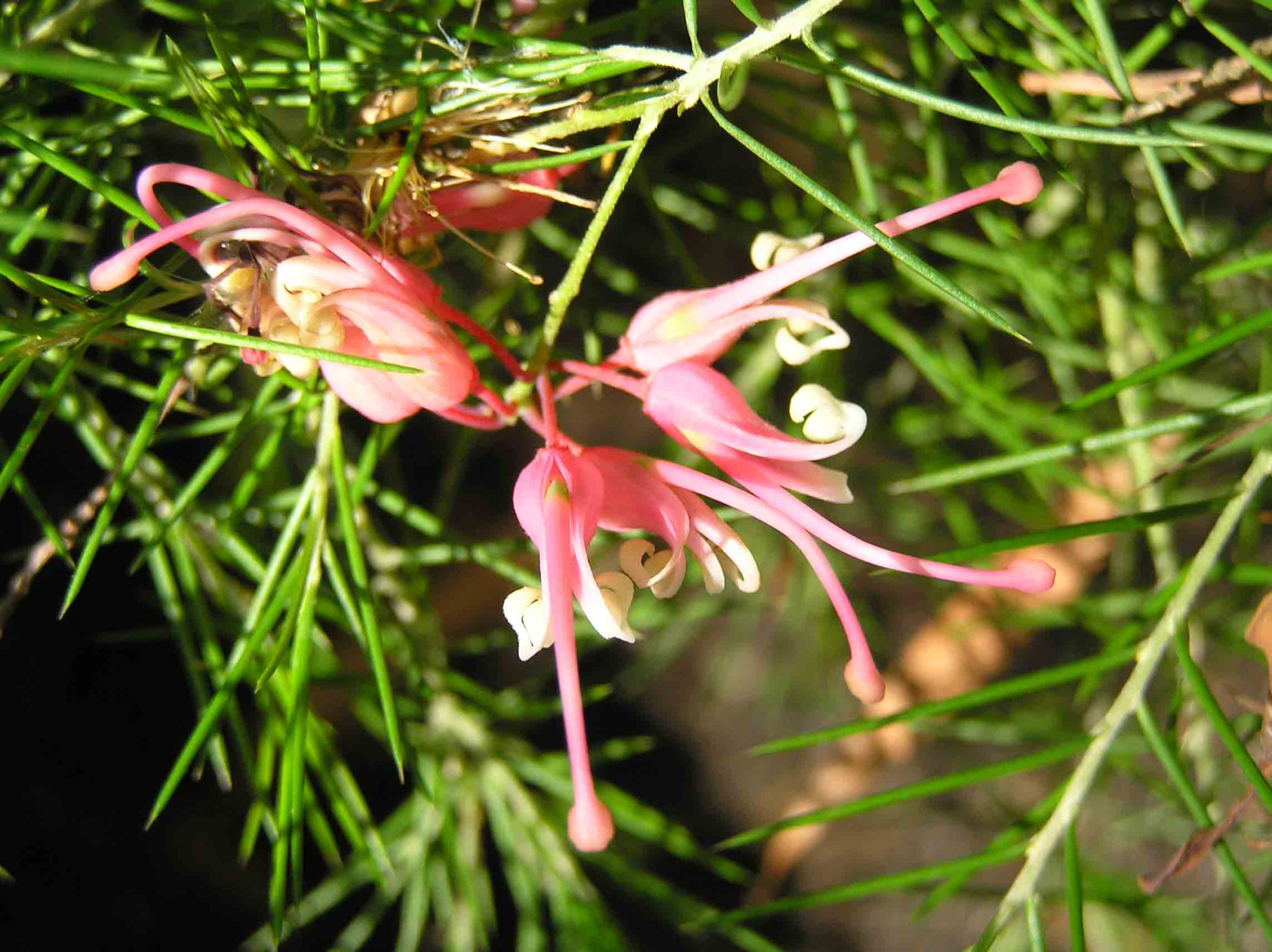
- In Amsterdam Botanic Garden

Conservation status
- Least Concern (IUCN 3.1)

Scientific classification
- Kingdom: Plantae
- Clade: Embryophytes
- Clade: Tracheophytes
- Clade: Spermatophytes
- Clade: Angiosperms
- Clade: Eudicots
- Order: Proteales
- Family: Proteaceae
- Genus: Grevillea
- Species: G. deflexa

Binomial name
- Grevillea deflexa F.Muell.

= Grevillea deflexa =

Species of shrub native to Western Australia

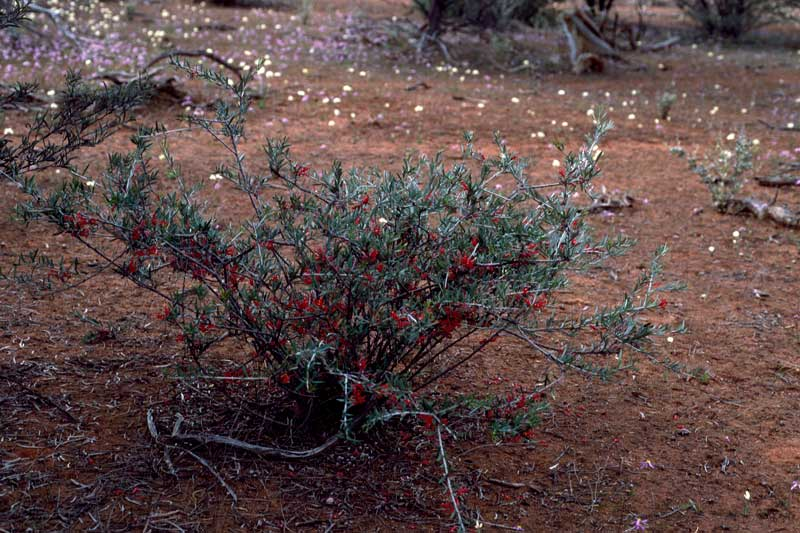
Habit near Yalgoo

Grevillea deflexa is a species of flowering plant in the family Proteaceae and is endemic to inland areas of central Western Australia. It is a shrub with linear to elliptic or egg-shaped leaves, and groups of red, yellow or red and yellow flowers.

== Description ==
Grevillea deflexa is a low to open, erect shrub that typically grows to a height of 0.2–2 m (7.9 in – 6 ft 6.7 in). Its leaves are linear, elliptic, narrowly egg-shaped, or lance-shaped, 10–90 mm (0.39–3.54 in) long and 0.7–10 mm (0.028–0.394 in) wide, the lower surface silky-hairy. The flowers are arranged in loose groups of two to five in leaf axils on a rachis 20–50 mm (0.79–1.97 in) long. The flowers are red, yellow or red and yellow with a red or yellow style, the pistil 17–24 mm (0.67–0.94 in) long and silky-hairy. Flowering occurs from May to October and the fruit is an elliptic to oval follicle 11–16 mm (0.43–0.63 in) long.

== Taxonomy ==
Grevillea deflexa was first formally described in 1883 by Ferdinand von Mueller in The Chemist and Druggist with Australasian Supplement from specimens collected near the Gascoyne River. The specific epithet (deflexa) means "bent or turned downwards", referring to the flowers.

== Distribution and habitat ==
This grevillea grows in mulga between Laverton and the upper Gascoyne River and between the Thomas River and Mount Singleton in Avon Wheatbelt, Carnarvon, Gascoyne, Geraldton Sandplains, Murchison and Yalgoo biogeographic regions of central inland Western Australia.

== Conservation status ==
Grevillea decurrens is listed as least concern on the IUCN Red List of Threatened Species. It has a large distribution, a stable population and is not currently facing any major threats.

== See also ==
- List of Grevillea species
