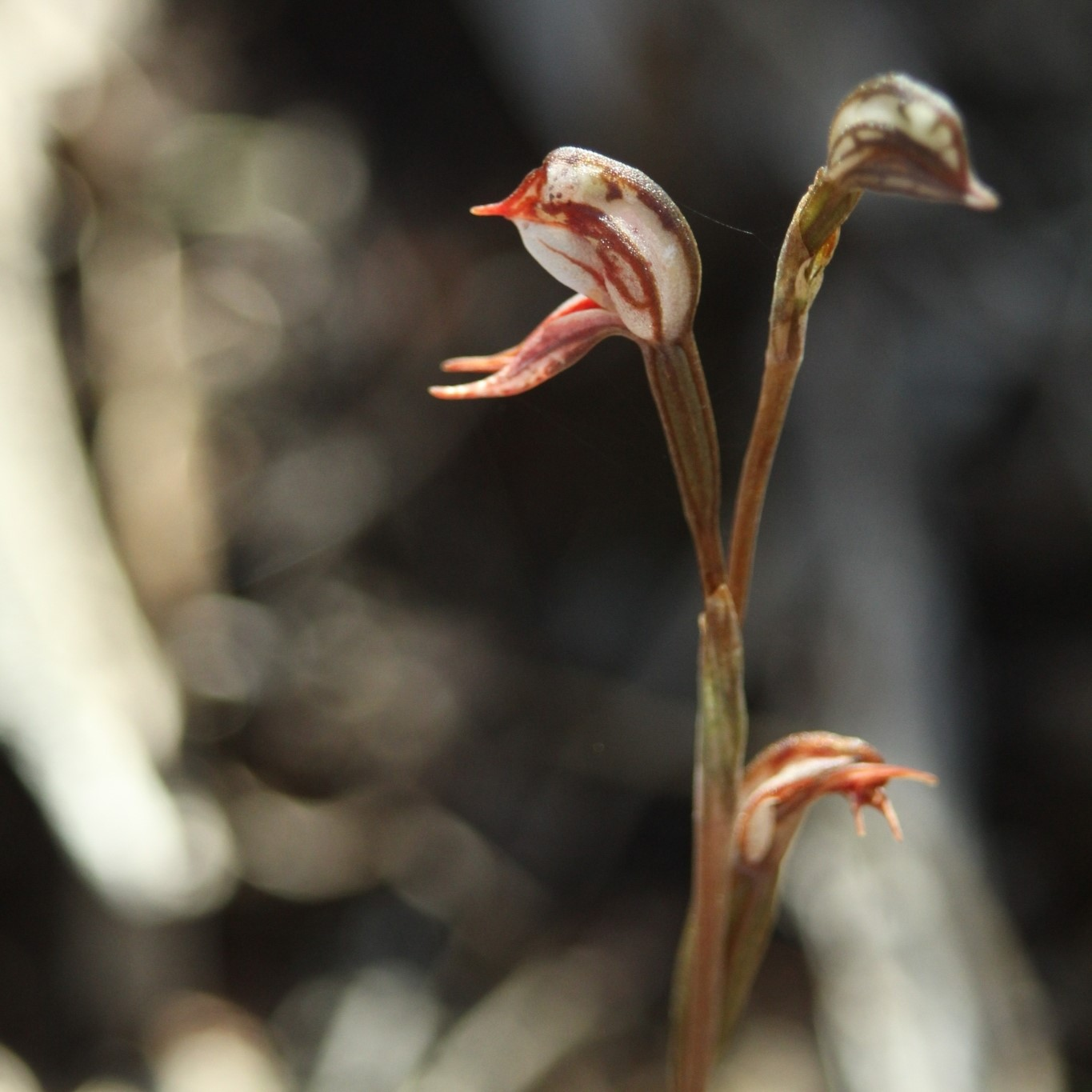

Scientific classification
- Kingdom: Plantae
- Clade: Embryophytes
- Clade: Tracheophytes
- Clade: Angiosperms
- Clade: Monocots
- Order: Asparagales
- Family: Orchidaceae
- Subfamily: Orchidoideae
- Tribe: Cranichideae
- Genus: Pterostylis
- Species: P. perculta

Binomial name
- Pterostylis perculta (D.L.Jones & C.J.French) D.L.Jones

Synonyms
- Oligochaetochilus percultus D.L.Jones & C.J.French; Oligochaetochilus sp. Ongerup (K.R.Newbey 4874); Pterostylis aff. pusilla; Pterostylis platypus A.P.Br., P.Dundas, K.W.Dixon & Hopper nom. inval.; Pterostylis platypus N.Hoffman & A.P.Br. nom. inval., nom. nud.; Pterostylis sp. Ongerup

= Pterostylis perculta =

Ruddy hood

Species of orchid

Pterostylis perculta, commonly known as ruddy hood is a plant in the orchid family Orchidaceae and is endemic to the south-west of Western Australia. Both flowering and non-flowering plants have a relatively large rosette of leaves and flowering plants have up to five reddish-brown and white flowers with relatively short tips on the sepals.

== Description ==
Pterostylis perculta is a terrestrial, perennial, deciduous, herb with an underground tuber and a rosette of leaves, the rosette up to 30 mm (1 in) in diameter. Flowering plants have a rosette at the base of the flowering stem but the leaves are usually withered by flowering time. Up to five reddish-brown and white flowers 4–6 mm (0.16–0.24 in) wide are borne on a flowering stem 70–150 mm (3–6 in) tall. The dorsal sepal and petals form a hood or "galea" over the column with the dorsal sepal having a short point on its end. The lateral sepals turn downward with short tips curving forwards. The labellum is small, almost glabrous, dark brown and insect-like. Flowering occurs from September to November.

== Taxonomy and naming ==
This orchid was first formally described in 2014 by Mark Clements and Christopher French and given the name Oligochaetochilus percultus from a specimen collected near Cascade and the description was published in Australian Orchid Review. In 2015 David Jones changed the name to Pterostylis perculta "to allow for the different taxonomic views". It has previously been known as Pterostylis sp. 'Ongerup'. The specific epithet (perculta) a Latin word meaning "highly adorned".

== Distribution and habitat ==
The ruddy hood grows in rocky soil in shrubland and mallee woodland between the Stirling Range and the Thomas River.

== Conservation ==
Pterostylis perculta is classified as "not threatened" by the Western Australian Government Department of Parks and Wildlife.
