= Ptilotus actinocladus =

Conservation status
- Priority One — Poorly Known Taxa (DEC)

Scientific classification
- Kingdom: Plantae
- Clade: Tracheophytes
- Clade: Angiosperms
- Clade: Eudicots
- Order: Caryophyllales
- Family: Amaranthaceae
- Genus: Ptilotus
- Species: P. actinocladus

Binomial name
- Ptilotus actinocladus T.Hammer & R.W.Davis

Species of grass-like plant

Ptilotus actinocladus is a species of flowering plant in the family Amaranthaceae and is endemic to inland Western Australia. It is a prostrate annual herb with a central stem and radiating lateral stems, linear to lance-shaped stem leaves, pink spherical or cylindrical spikes of flowers with long, silky hairs, and four fertile stamens.

== Description ==
Ptilotus actinocladus is a prostrate, annual herb that typically grows up to 10 cm (3.9 in) high and 5 cm (2.0 in) wide, with a central stem and radiating lateral stems up to 18 cm (7.1 in) long. The stem leaves are linear to lance-shaped, 4–22 mm (0.16–0.87 in) long and 0.5–3 mm (0.020–0.118 in) wide. The flowers are pink, borne in spherical to cylindrical heads 5–15 mm (0.20–0.59 in) long and 11–14 mm (0.43–0.55 in) wide on the end of lateral stems. There are egg-shaped, glabrous, translucent bracts and broadly egg-shaped bracteoles. The tepals are narrowly lance-shaped, less than 10 mm (0.39 in) long, the outer surface with long, silky, knotty hairs. There are four fertile stamens and one staminode 2.3–2.5 mm (0.091–0.098 in) long. Flowering has been observed from July to November.

== Taxonomy ==
Ptilotus actinocladus was first formally described in 2018 by Timothy Hammer and Robert Davis in the journal Nuytsia from specimens collected on Doolgunna Station in 2003. The specific epithet (actinocladus) is from Ancient Greek words meaning 'a ray or beam' and 'a branch or stem', referring to the sometimes many prostrate flowering stems of this species.

== Distribution and habitat ==
Ptilotus actinocladus has been collected on Doolgunna Station, Woodlands Station and Belele Station in the Gascoyne and Murchison bioregions of inland Western Australia, where it grows on seasonally flooded plains, with sparse vegetation.

== Conservation status ==
This species of Ptilotus is listed as "Priority One" by the Government of Western Australia Department of Biodiversity, Conservation and Attractions, meaning that it is known from only one or a few locations where it is potentially at risk.

== See also ==
- List of Ptilotus species
