= Goodenia quasilibera =

Scientific classification
- Kingdom: Plantae
- Clade: Tracheophytes
- Clade: Angiosperms
- Clade: Eudicots
- Clade: Asterids
- Order: Asterales
- Family: Goodeniaceae
- Genus: Goodenia
- Species: G. quasilibera

Binomial name
- Goodenia quasilibera Carolin

Species of plant

Goodenia quasilibera is a species of flowering plant in the family Goodeniaceae and is native to Western Australia and South Australia. It is an ascending to erect herb with lance-shaped leaves at the base of the plant, sometimes with toothed edges and racemes of yellow flowers with brownish lines.

== Description ==
Goodenia quasilibera is an ascending to erect herb that typically grows to a height of up to 30 cm (12 in) with simple and glandular hairs. The leaves at the base of the plant are lance-shaped, 30–60 mm (1.2–2.4 in) long and 3–7 mm (0.12–0.28 in) wide, sometimes with toothed edges. The flowers are arranged in racemes up to 50 mm (2.0 in) long, with leaf-like bracts, each flower on a pedicel 15–50 mm (0.59–1.97 in) long. The sepals are elliptic, 3–5 mm (0.12–0.20 in) long, the petals yellow with brownish lines and 12–17 mm (0.47–0.67 in) long. The lower lobes of the corolla are 6–7 mm (0.24–0.28 in) long with wings about up to 2.5 mm (0.098 in) wide. Flowering mainly occurs from August to January.

== Taxonomy and naming ==
Goodenia quasilibera was first formally described in 1992 by Roger Charles Carolin in the Flora of Australia from a specimen collected by Alex George in the Thomas River valley in 1960. The specific epithet (quasilibera) means "almost free", referring to the sepals that are almost free from the ovary.

== Distribution ==
This goodenia grows in sandy soil and clay on flats and occurs in disjunct populations between Meekatharra and Cape Arid in Western Australia and the Eyre Peninsula in South Australia.

== Conservation status ==
Goodenia quasilibera is classified as "not threatened" by the Government of Western Australia Department of Parks and Wildlife.
