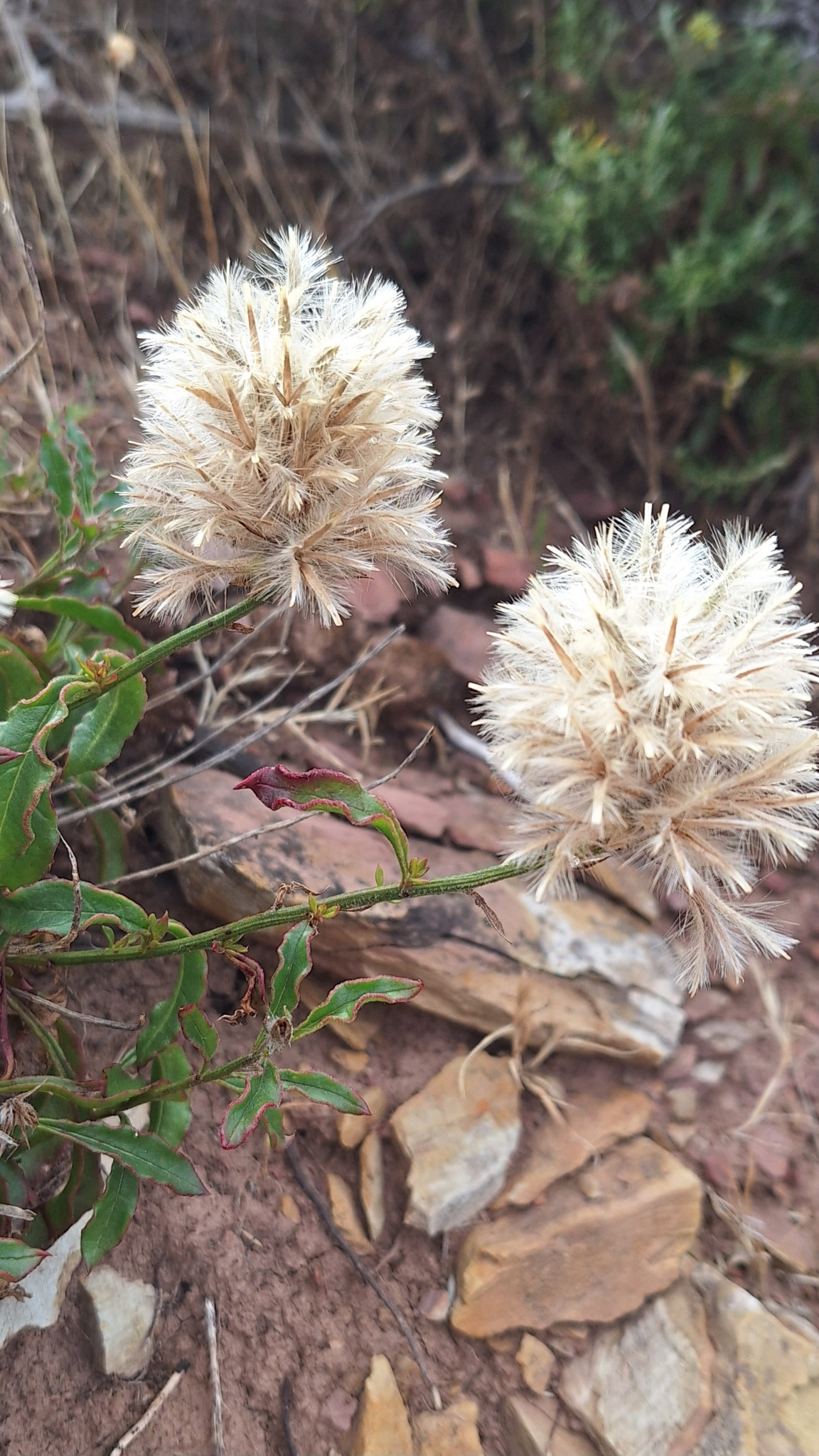

Scientific classification
- Kingdom: Plantae
- Clade: Tracheophytes
- Clade: Angiosperms
- Clade: Eudicots
- Order: Caryophyllales
- Family: Amaranthaceae
- Genus: Ptilotus
- Species: P. angustifolius

Binomial name
- Ptilotus angustifolius (Benl) T.Hammer

Synonyms
- Ptilotus nobilis subsp. angustifolius (Benl) Lally & W.R.Barker; Ptilotus nobilis var. angustifolius Benl

= Ptilotus angustifolius =

Species of grass-like plant

Ptilotus angustifolius, commonly known as regal fox tails, is a species of flowering plant in the family Amaranthaceae and is endemic to South Australia. It is a low, bushy herb with several stems, narrowly egg-shaped leaves at the base of the plant, oval, intensely fragrant spikes of purple flowers and cylindrical heads of many long, hairy fruits.

== Description ==
Ptilotus angustifolius is a low, bushy herb with several stems arising from a rhizome. The leaves at the base of the plants are linear to narrowly spatula-shaped, 10–40 mm (0.39–1.57 in) long and 2–6 mm (0.079–0.236 in) wide. The flowers are purple in intensely fragrant groups of about 15 flowers, borne in oval heads up to 50–200 mm (2.0–7.9 in) long. Flowering occurs in October and November and the fruit is borne in long, papery and hairy heads, each fruit containing one seed.

== Taxonomy ==
This species was first formally described in 1959 by Gerhard Benl who gave it the name Ptilotus nobilis var. angustifolius in the journal Mitteilungen der Botanischen Staatssammlung Munchen from specimens collected by Max Koch in the Flinders Ranges in 1901. In 2018, Timothy Andrew Hammer raised the variety to species status as Ptilotus angustifolius in Australian Systematic Botany. The specific epithet (angustifolius) means 'narrow-leaved'.

== Distribution and habitat ==
Ptilotus angustifolius grows on rocky slopes or hills in association with Eucalyptus microcarpa, from near Quorn to Victor Harbour.

Ptilotus angustifolius

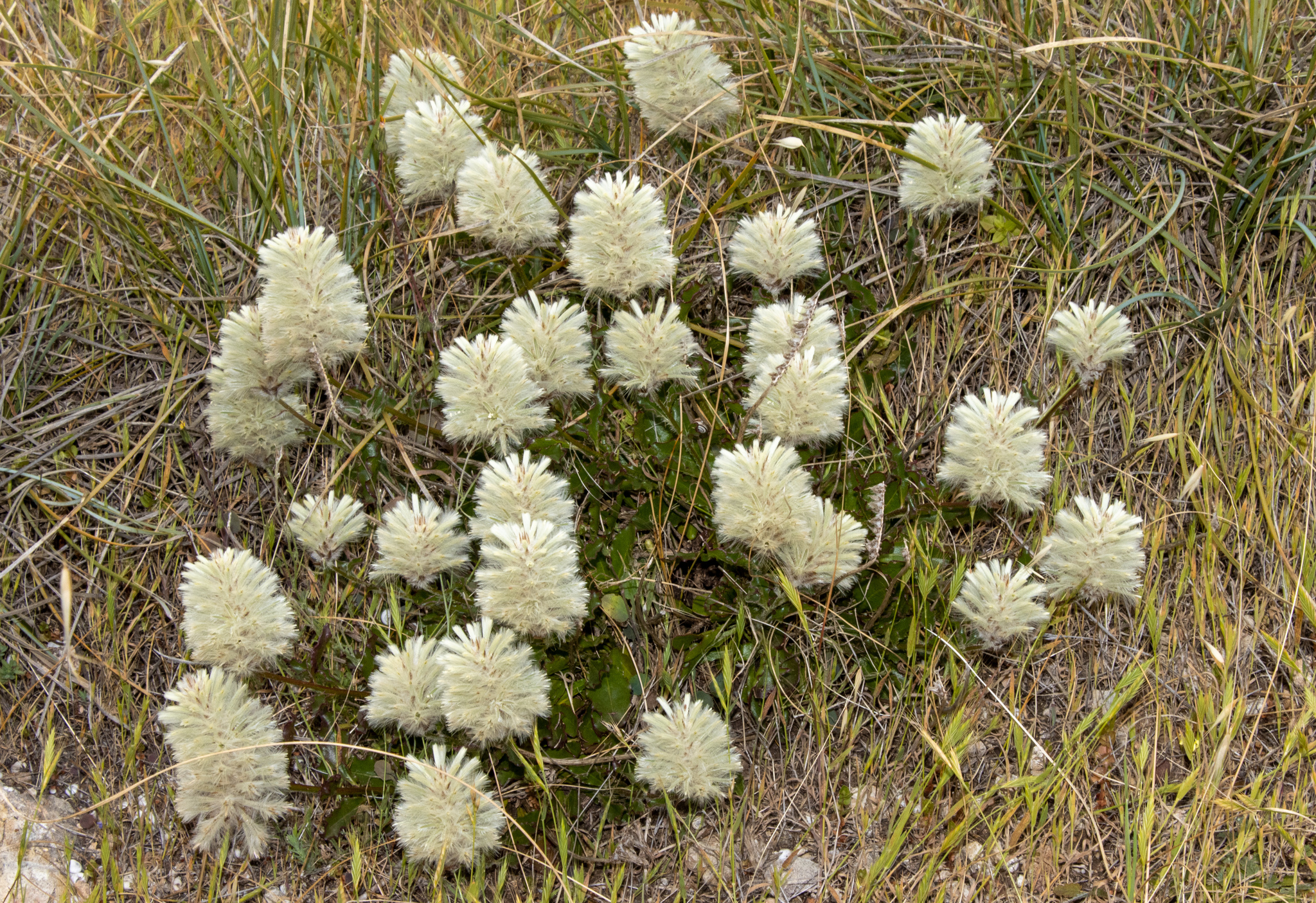

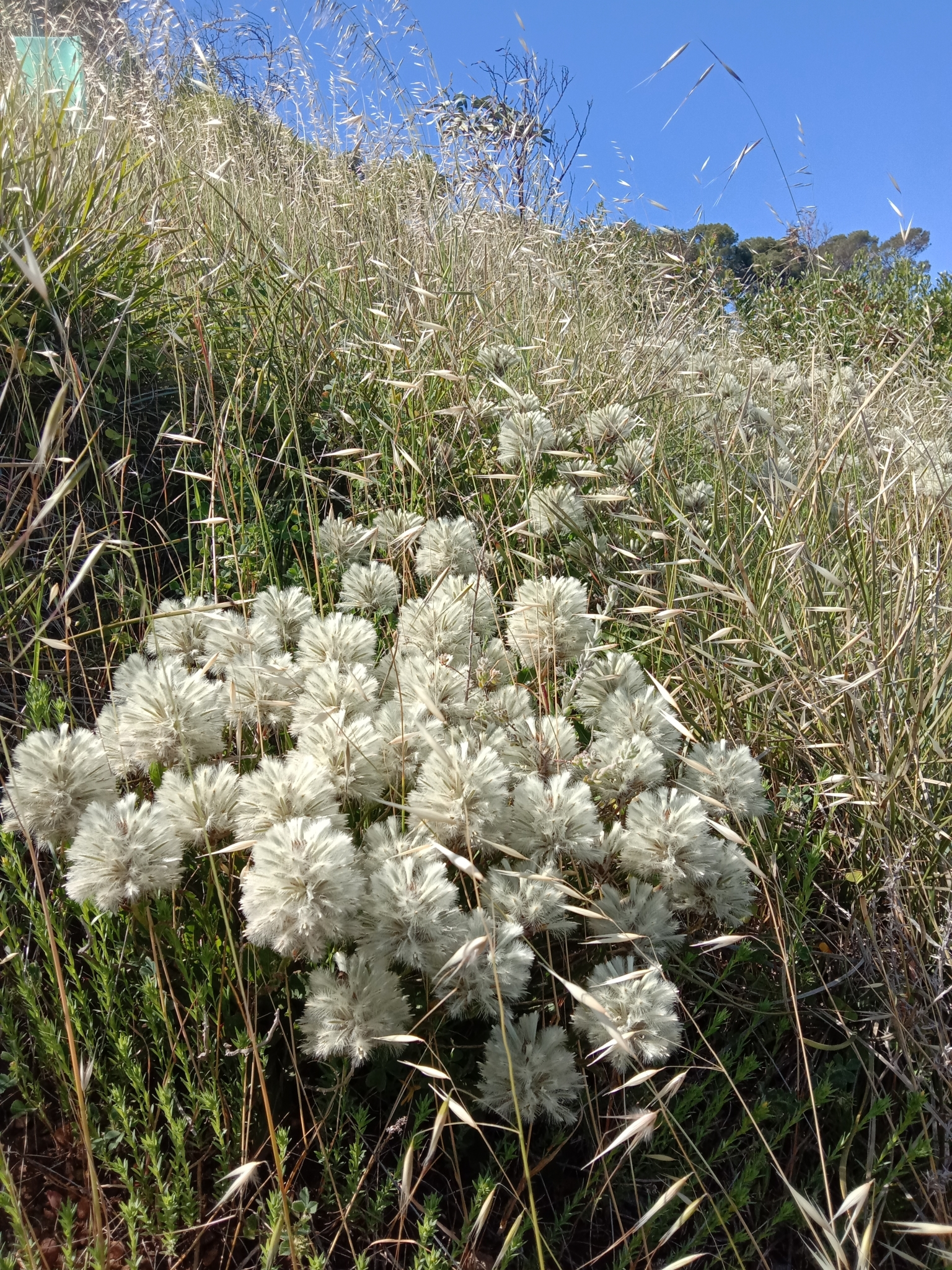

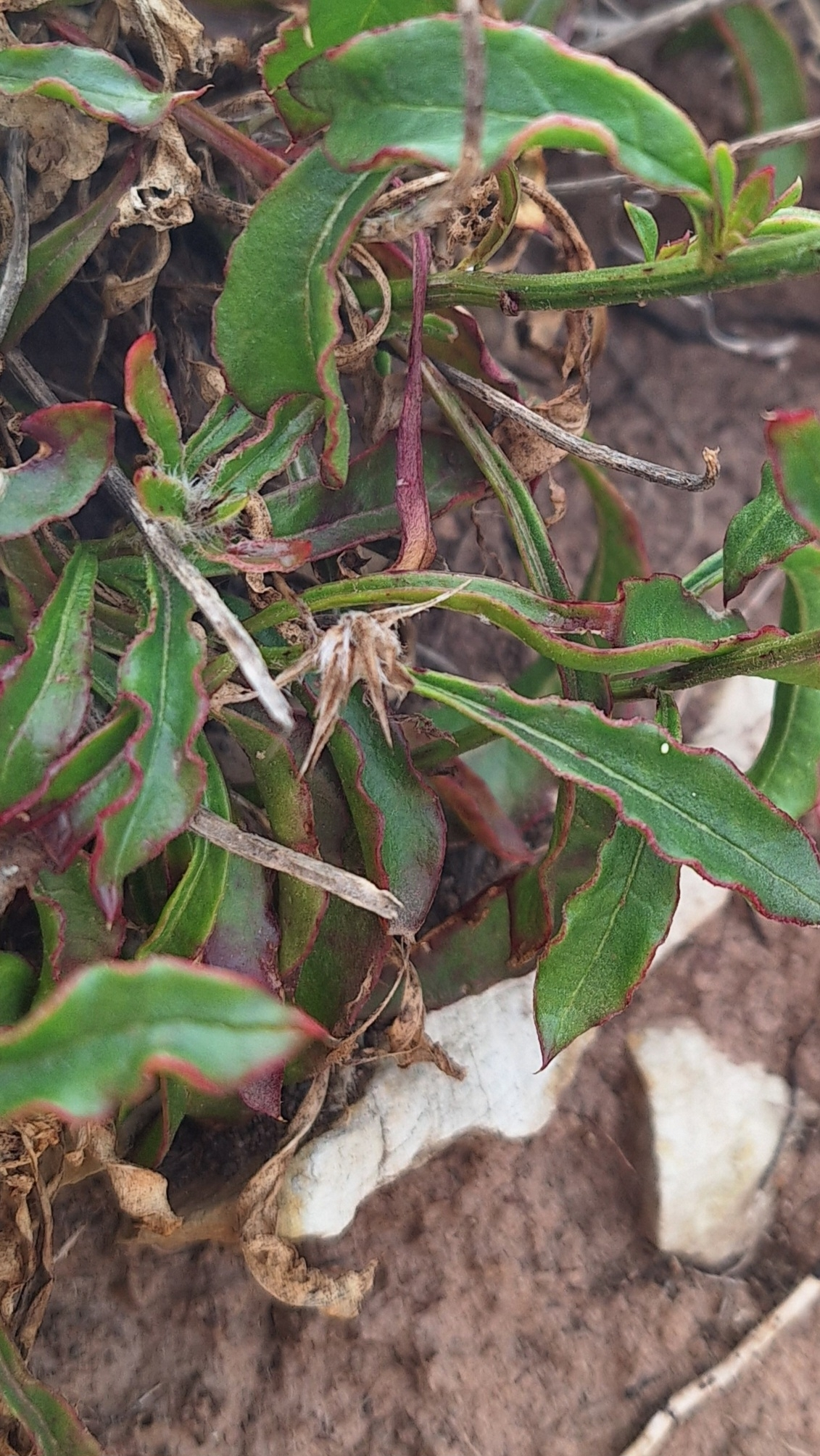

== See also ==
- List of Ptilotus species
