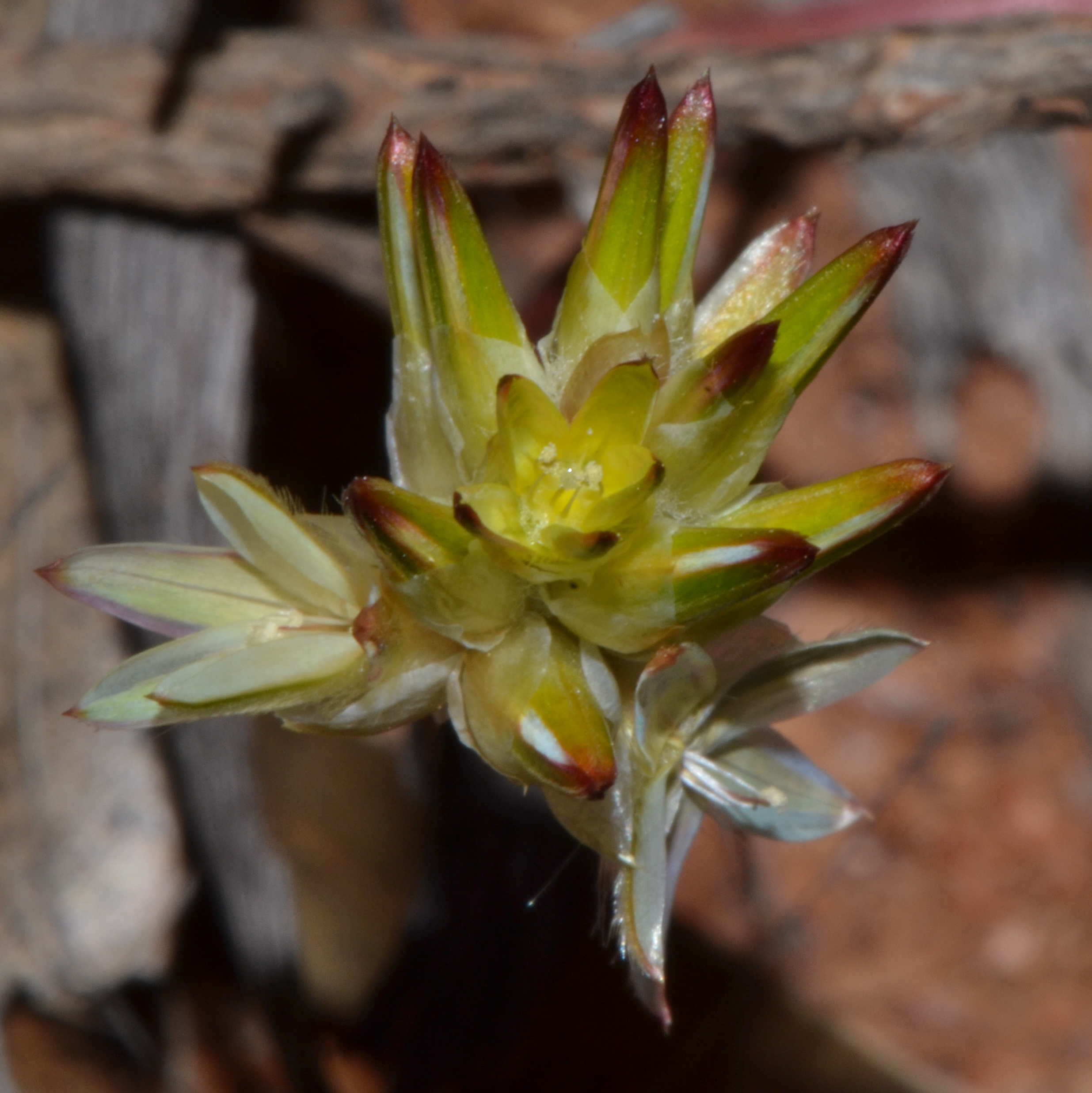
- About 50 km (31 mi) north-east of Wubin

Scientific classification
- Kingdom: Plantae
- Clade: Tracheophytes
- Clade: Angiosperms
- Clade: Eudicots
- Order: Caryophyllales
- Family: Amaranthaceae
- Genus: Ptilotus
- Species: P. eremita

Binomial name
- Ptilotus eremita (S.Moore) R.W.Davis & T.Hammer

Synonyms
- Ptilotus gaudichaudii subsp. eremita (S.Moore) Lally; Trichinium eremita S.Moore

= Ptilotus eremita =

Species of grass-like plant

Ptilotus eremita is a species of flowering plant in the family Amaranthaceae and is endemic to the south-west of Western Australia. It is a sometimes prostrate, annual herb with hairy leaves on the stems and at the base of the plant and green or yellow, oval or cylindrical spikes of flowers.

== Description ==
Ptilotus eremita is an erect, sometimes prostrate annual herb and has several stems. Leaves on the stem and in the rosette at the base of the plant are 4–15 mm (0.16–0.59 in) long and 0.8–5 mm (0.031–0.197 in) wide. The flowers are green or yellow, borne in oval to cylindrical heads. There are glabrous, colourless bracts 3.5–3.6 mm (0.14–0.14 in) long and bracteoles 4.8–5 mm (0.19–0.20 in) long. The outer tepals are 7.3–7.5 mm (0.29–0.30 in) long and the inner tepals 7.0–7.2 mm (0.28–0.28 in) with a tuft of hairs on the inner surface. The style is 2.0–2.5 mm (0.079–0.098 in) long and fixed to the side of the ovary.

== Taxonomy ==
This species was first formally described in 1899 by Spencer Le Marchant Moore who gave it the name Trichinium eremita in Botanical Journal of the Linnean Society. In 2018, and Robert Davis and Timothy Hammer transferred the species to Ptilotus as P. eremita in Australian Systematic Botany. The specific epithet (eremita) means a close connection with desert, in other words 'desert dweller'.

== Distribution ==
This species of Ptilotus is widely distributed in the Avon Wheatbelt, Carnarvon, Coolgardie, Geraldton Sandplains, Mallee, Murchison, Swan Coastal Plain and Yalgoo bioregions of south-western Western Australia

== Conservation status ==
Ptilotus eremita is listed as "not threatened" by the Government of Western Australia Department of Biodiversity, Conservation and Attractions.

== See also ==
- List of Ptilotus species
