= Three Rivers Station =

Pastoral lease in Western Australia

Coordinates: 25°07′30.75″S 119°09′06.17″E

Location in Western Australia

Three Rivers or Three Rivers Station is a pastoral lease and sheep station located in the Mid West region of Western Australia. Three Rivers and the neighbouring Bryah Station occupy an area of 513,000 hectares (1,267,651 acres) on the headwater of the Gascoyne River and primarily composed of grasslands.

Three Rivers Station has a total area of 480,000 hectares (1,186,106 acres).

The longest river in Western Australia, the Gascoyne River, rises near the Great Northern Highway on the property and then flows west to the coast.

The station is situated approximately 120 miles (193 km) north of Meekatharra. It was established by the pastoralist Frederick Francis Burdett Wittenoom in 1884 when Wittenoom and B. J. Carlyon took up a large tract of land beyond Peak Hill and stocked it with cattle from Nookawarra Station.

The station had a registered office on St Georges Terrace in Perth that was established in 1920.

The well known pastoralist, David Stewart, acquired a share in the station in 1921.

The shearer, Harry Finlay, once shore 301 sheep in a day at the station in 1926.

Wesley Hall Taylor was found dead at the station in 1928 with a shotgun wound to the head. It was later determined that he had accidentally inflicted the wound to himself.

The station sold 1,200 sheep and 105 cattle, which were trucked out via Meekatharra in 1939.

In 1940, Paul Hanson, a book-keeper from the station, collapsed and died in his car about 25 miles (40 km) from the station. The woman he was driving, who did not know the country or how to drive a car, was stranded at the spot for three days and nights. She was found in a distraught condition by the station manager, Mr J. Bowman.

The area had good rains in 1948 with the station receiving over 3 inches (76 mm) in five days. Road were closed, as were many landing strips around the area.

An escapee from Barton's Mill prison farm, John Henry Price was caught and arrested at the station by Constable R. Carr in 1954.

The Forsyth family acquired Bryah Station in 1973 and expanded by acquiring Three Rivers in 1984. At this time the station was stocked with about 2,300 sheep and 250 cattle. The 1980s and 1990s were hard times with the area experiencing prolonged droughts and a boom in gold mining.

The lessee of Three Rivers in 2012 was Plutonic; Three Rivers is operating under the Crown Lease number CL168-1970 and has the Land Act number LA3114/926.

== See also ==
- List of ranches and stations
- List of the largest stations in Australia
