= Ptilotus falcatus =

Conservation status
- Priority One — Poorly Known Taxa (DEC)

Scientific classification
- Kingdom: Plantae
- Clade: Tracheophytes
- Clade: Angiosperms
- Clade: Eudicots
- Order: Caryophyllales
- Family: Amaranthaceae
- Genus: Ptilotus
- Species: P. falcatus

Binomial name
- Ptilotus falcatus R.W.Davis & T.Hammer

Species of grass-like plant

Ptilotus falcatus is a species of flowering plant in the family Amaranthaceae and is endemic to Western Australia. It is a prostrate to ascending perennial herb with annual stems from a woody rootstock, lance-shaped stem leaves with the narrower end towards the base, and single green or white, oval spikes of flowers.

== Description ==
Ptilotus falcatus is a prostrate to ascending perennial herb with annual stems from a woody rootstock and that typically grows to a height of up to 10 cm (3.9 in). The leaves on the stems are lance-shaped, with the narrower end towards the base, 28–45 mm (1.1–1.8 in) long and 1–4 mm (0.039–0.157 in) wide, and hairy mostly on the midrib and edges. There are egg-shaped or sickle-shaped, reddish brown bracts 8.9–10.0 mm (0.35–0.39 in) long and lance-shaped to narrowly egg-shaped bracteoles 8.5–9.1 mm (0.33–0.36 in) long with reddish-brown strip along the midrib. The flowers are borne in a green or white, oval spike, the outer tepals 18–20 mm (0.71–0.79 in) long, the inner tepals narrowly lance-shaped, 17–19 mm (0.67–0.75 in) long. There are 5 fertile stamens, the style is curved, 2.5–2.8 mm (0.098–0.110 in) long and fixed to the side of the ovary.

== Taxonomy ==
Ptilotus falcatus was first formally described in 2014 by Robert Wayne Davis and Timothy Hammer in the journal Nuytsia from specimens collected near Warradarge in 2011. The specific epithet (falcatus) means 'sickle-shaped', referring to the floral bracts of this species.

== Distribution ==
This species of Ptilotus is only known from one small population on private property near Warradarge growing in low heath on a north-east facing slope in the Geraldton Sandplains bioregion of Western Australia.

== Conservation status ==
Ptilotus falcatus is listed as "Priority One" by the Government of Western Australia Department of Biodiversity, Conservation and Attractions, meaning that it is known from only one or a few locations where it is potentially at risk.

== See also ==
- List of Ptilotus species
