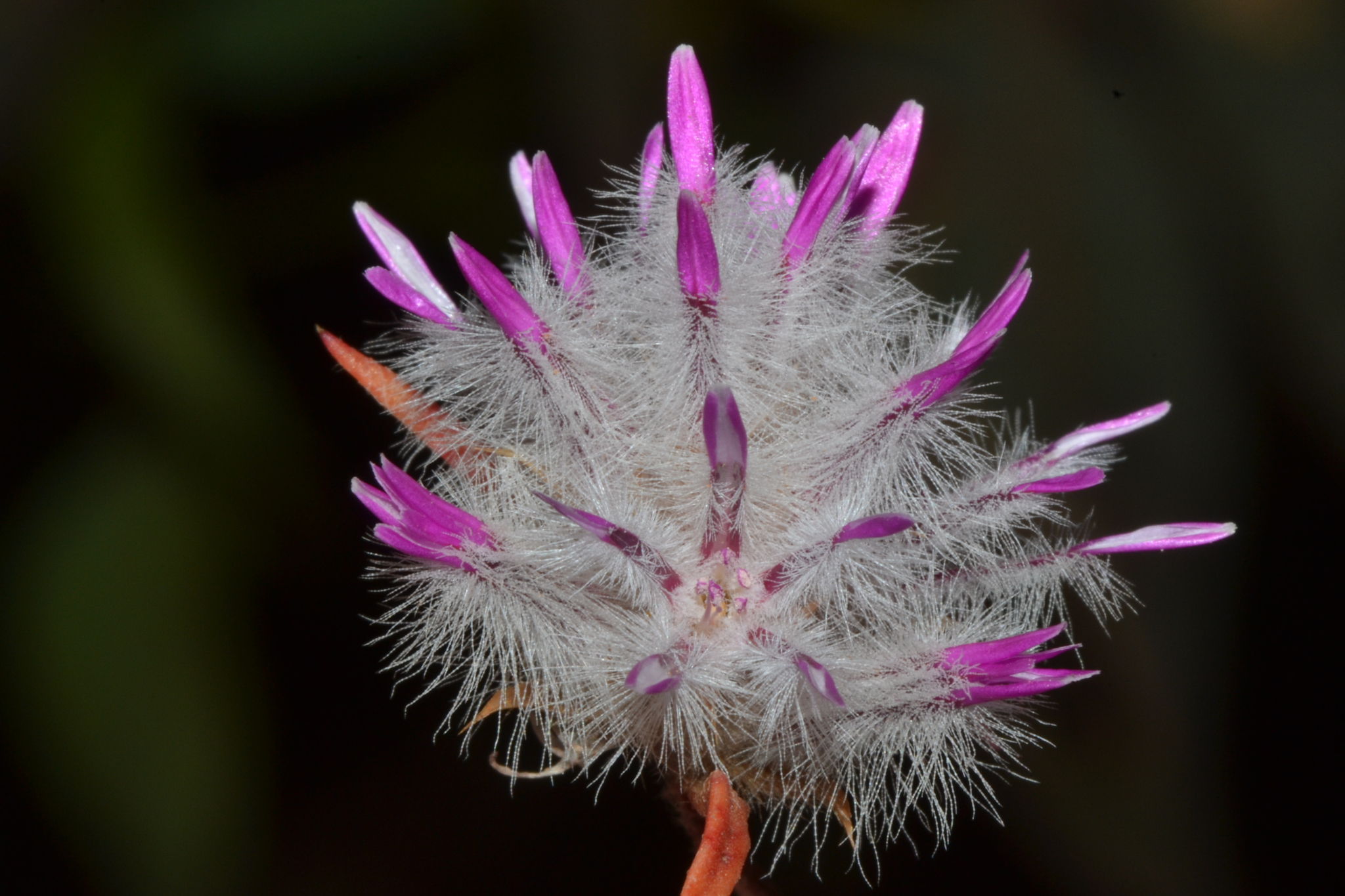

Scientific classification
- Kingdom: Plantae
- Clade: Tracheophytes
- Clade: Angiosperms
- Clade: Eudicots
- Order: Caryophyllales
- Family: Amaranthaceae
- Genus: Ptilotus
- Species: P. davisii

Binomial name
- Ptilotus davisii T.Hammer

= Ptilotus davisii =

Species of grass-like plant

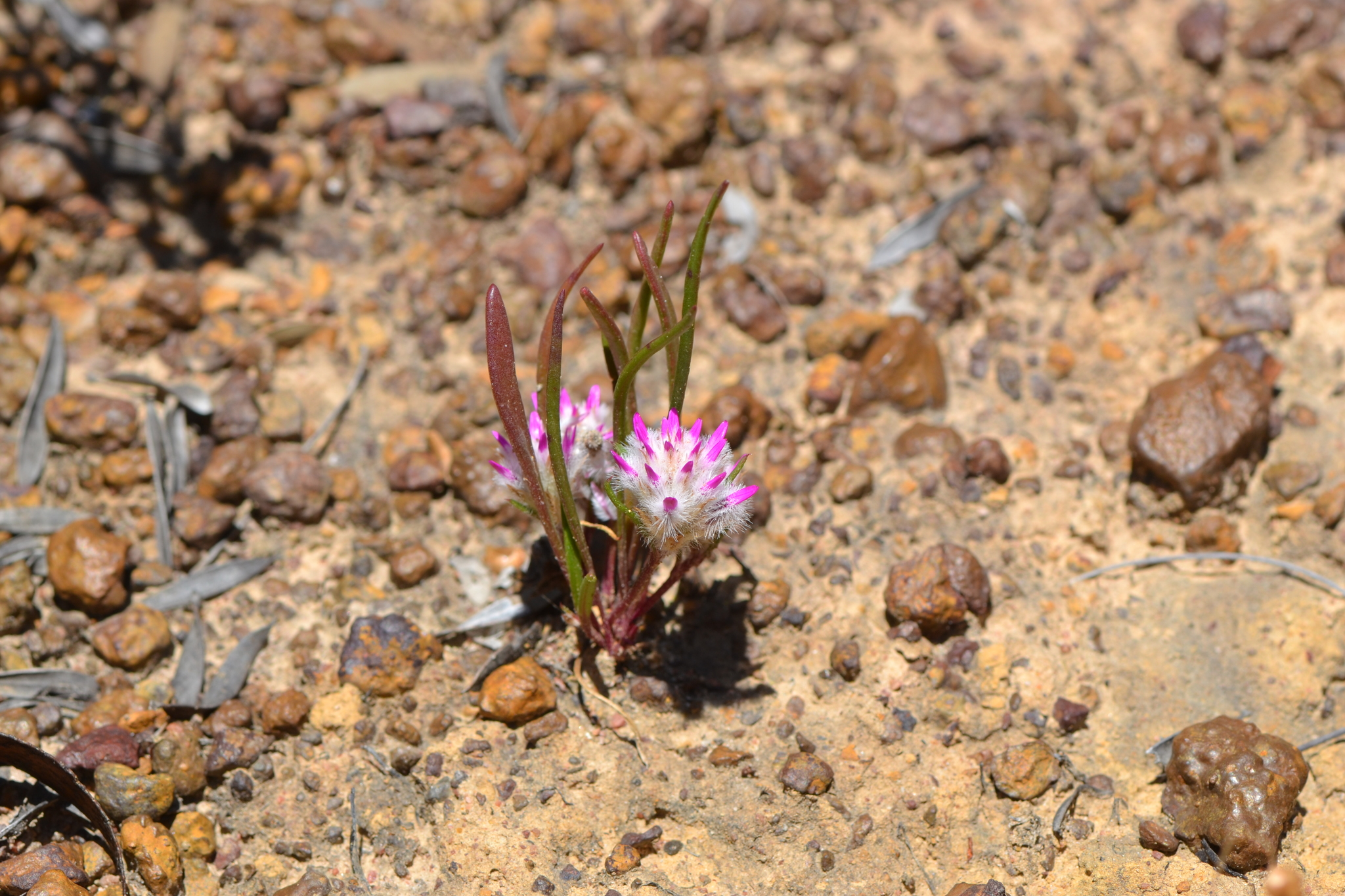
Habit near Mount Barker

Ptilotus davisii, commonly known as Davis's mulla mulla, is a species of flowering plant in the family Amaranthaceae and is endemic to the south-west of Western Australia. It is a perennial herb with hairy, linear to lance-shaped leaves, and hemispherical to spherical spikes of pink or magenta flowers.

== Description ==
Ptilotus davisii is a shrub that typically grows to 40–150 mm (1.6–5.9 in) high and 50–200 mm (2.0–7.9 in) wide and has several low-lying to erect, ribbed stems. The leaves at the base of the plants are linear to lance-shaped with the narrower end towards the base, 40–150 mm (1.6–5.9 in) long and 0.5–7 mm (0.020–0.276 in) wide and the stem leaves are linear to narrowly lance-shaped 10–30 mm (0.39–1.18 in) long and 0.5–4 mm (0.020–0.157 in) wide. The flower spikes are hemispherical to spherical, rarely oval, up to 10–35 mm (0.39–1.38 in) long and 20–40 mm (0.79–1.57 in) wide with brown or white egg-shaped bracts 6.8–9 mm (0.27–0.35 in) long and 2.5–3.5 mm (0.098–0.138 in) wide and bracteoles 6.2–11.5 mm (0.24–0.45 in) long and 2.6–3.9 mm (0.10–0.15 in) wide. The outer sepals are lance-shaped, 9–13.5 mm (0.35–0.53 in) long and 1.1–2.1 mm (0.043–0.083 in) wide and the inner sepals are lance-shaped, 8.2–14 mm (0.32–0.55 in) long and 1.0–1.6 mm (0.039–0.063 in) wide. There are three to five fertile stamens, up to two staminodes and the ovary is cone-shaped and glabrous. Flowering has been observed from November to February.

== Taxonomy ==
Ptilotus davisii was first formally described in 2020 by Timothy Andrew Hammer in the journal Swainsona from specimens collected near Woogenellup in 2018. The specific epithet (davisii) honours Robert Wayne Davis, a Western Australian botanist who has authored 16 species of Ptilotus.

== Distribution and habitat ==
This species of Ptilotus has been collected on winter-wet plains, near creeks and in roadside drains, often in wandoo woodland and Melaleuca shrubland in the Avon Wheatbelt, Esperance Plains, Jarrah Forest and Mallee bioregions of south-western Western Australia.

== Conservation status ==
Ptilotus davisii is listed as "not threatened" by the Government of Western Australia Department of Biodiversity, Conservation and Attractions.

== See also ==
- List of Ptilotus species
