= Swainsona katjarra =

Conservation status
- Declared rare (DEC)

Scientific classification
- Kingdom: Plantae
- Clade: Tracheophytes
- Clade: Angiosperms
- Clade: Eudicots
- Clade: Rosids
- Order: Fabales
- Family: Fabaceae
- Subfamily: Faboideae
- Genus: Swainsona
- Species: S. katjarra

Binomial name
- Swainsona katjarra R.W.Davis & T.Hammer

Species of plant

Swainsona katjarra, commonly known as Birriliburu swainsona, is a species of flowering plant in the family Fabaceae and is endemic to inland Western Australia. It is an erect annual herb with imparipinnate leaves with 4 to 6 lance-shaped to egg-shaped to elliptical leaflets, and racemes of 15 to 25 magenta flowers.

== Description ==
Swainsona katjarra is an erect annual herb, that typically grows to a height of about 50 cm (20 in)and has several stems 2.5–5 mm (0.098–0.197 in) wide. Its leaves are imparipinnate, 60–90 mm (2.4–3.5 in) long on an elongated petiole with 4 to 6 egg-shaped to elliptical leaflets with the narrower end towards the base, 10–20 mm (0.39–0.79 in) long and 4–8 mm (0.16–0.31 in) wide. There are triangular stipules 8–10 mm (0.31–0.39 in) long at the base of the petiole. The flowers are arranged in racemes 100–200 mm (3.9–7.9 in) long with 15 to 25 flowers on a peduncle 50–70 mm (2.0–2.8 in) wide, each flower 8–11 mm (0.31–0.43 in) long on a pedicel 2.0–2.5 mm (0.079–0.098 in) long. The sepals are joined at the base, forming a tube 2–3 mm (0.079–0.118 in) long, the sepal lobes 3.5–4.5 mm (0.14–0.18 in) long. The petals are magenta, the standard petal 12–12.5 mm (0.47–0.49 in) long and 11–12 mm (0.43–0.47 in) wide, the wings purple and 9.5–11 mm (0.37–0.43 in) long, and the keel purple and 11–12 mm (0.43–0.47 in) long and 5.5–5.8 mm (0.22–0.23 in) deep. Flowering occurs has been observed in August, and the fruit is an elliptical pod 8–10 mm (0.31–0.39 in) long and hairy.

== Taxonomy ==
Swainsona katjarra was first formally described in 2020 by Robert Davis and Timothy Hammer in the journal Swainsona from specimens collected on the south side of the Carnarvon Range. The specific epithet (katjarra) is the indigenous name for the Carnarvon Range.

== Distribution and habitat ==
This species of Swainsona is only known from the Carnarvon Range in the Gascoyne, Little Sandy Desert and Murchison bioregions of inland Western Australia.

== Conservation status ==
Swainsona katjarra is listed as "Threatened Flora (Declared Rare Flora — Extant)" by the Western Australian Government Department of Biodiversity, Conservation and Attractions.
