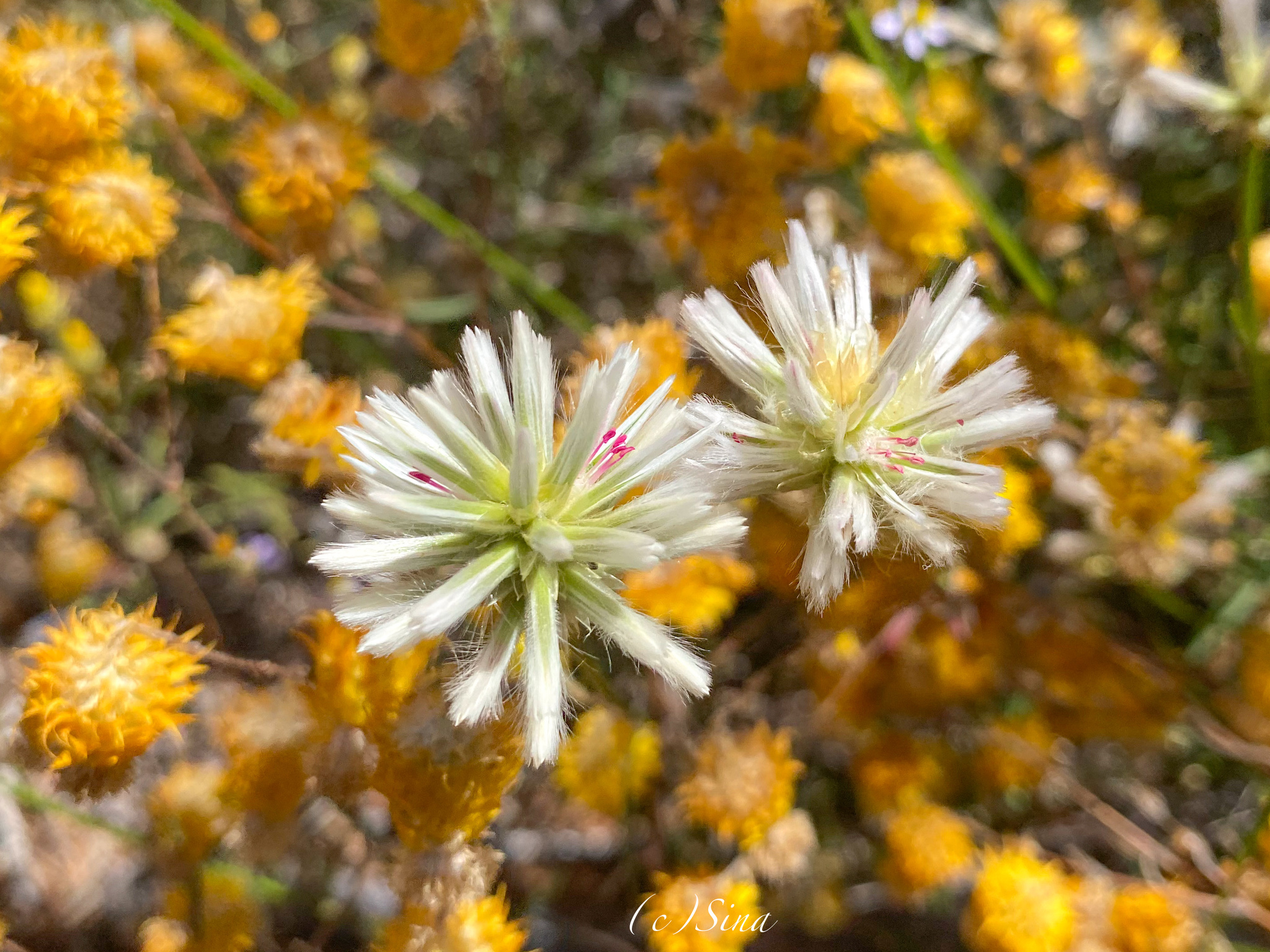

Scientific classification
- Kingdom: Plantae
- Clade: Tracheophytes
- Clade: Angiosperms
- Clade: Eudicots
- Order: Caryophyllales
- Family: Amaranthaceae
- Genus: Ptilotus
- Species: P. benlii

Binomial name
- Ptilotus benlii R.W.Davis & T.Hammer

= Ptilotus benlii =

Species of grass-like plant

Ptilotus benlii is a species of flowering plant in the family Amaranthaceae and is endemic to northern Western Australia. It is an erect, perennial herb with a ribbed stem, narrowly lance-shaped stem leaves with the narrower end towards the base, green or white, oval or cylindrical spikes of flowers with long, silky hairs, and five fertile stamens.

== Description ==
Ptilotus benlii is an erect, perennial herb that typically grows up to 45 cm (18 in) high, with a ribbed, hairy stem. The stem leaves are narrowly lance-shaped stem with the narrower end towards the base, 10–60 mm (0.39–2.36 in) long and 1–4 mm (0.039–0.157 in) wide. There are no leaves at the base of the plant. The flowers are green or white, borne in oval to cylindrical heads 20–48 mm (0.79–1.89 in) long and 28–34 mm (1.1–1.3 in) wide on the end of stems. There are egg-shaped, glabrous, transparent bracts 5.5–7.7 mm (0.22–0.30 in) long and 3.0–3.2 mm (0.12–0.13 in) wide, and broadly egg-shaped bracteoles. The tepals are narrowly lance-shaped, 13–16 mm (0.51–0.63 in) long, 1.1–1.8 mm (0.043–0.071 in) wide, the inner tepals with woolly hairs. There are five fertile stamens, the style is 5.5–7.3 mm (0.22–0.29 in) long and the ovary is glabrous. Flowering occurs from mid to late spring.

== Taxonomy ==
Ptilotus benlii was first formally described in 2018 by Robert Davis and Timothy Hammer in the journal Nuytsia from specimens collected 20 km (12 mi) north-west of Northampton in 2005. The specific epithet (benlii) honours the German botanist Gerhard Benl (1910–2001), for his significant contribution to the taxonomy of the genus Ptilotus.

== Distribution and habitat ==
This species of Ptilotus grows in a range of habitats, often in open scrub or mallee woodland with Acacia rostellifera, from near Northampton to Nungarin and Youanmi Station in the Avon Wheatbelt, Geraldton Sandplains, Murchison and Yalgoo bioregions of Western Australia.

== Conservation status ==
Ptilotus benlii is listed as "not threatened" by the Government of Western Australia Department of Biodiversity, Conservation and Attractions.

== See also ==
- List of Ptilotus species
