= Landor River =

River in Western Australia

Landor
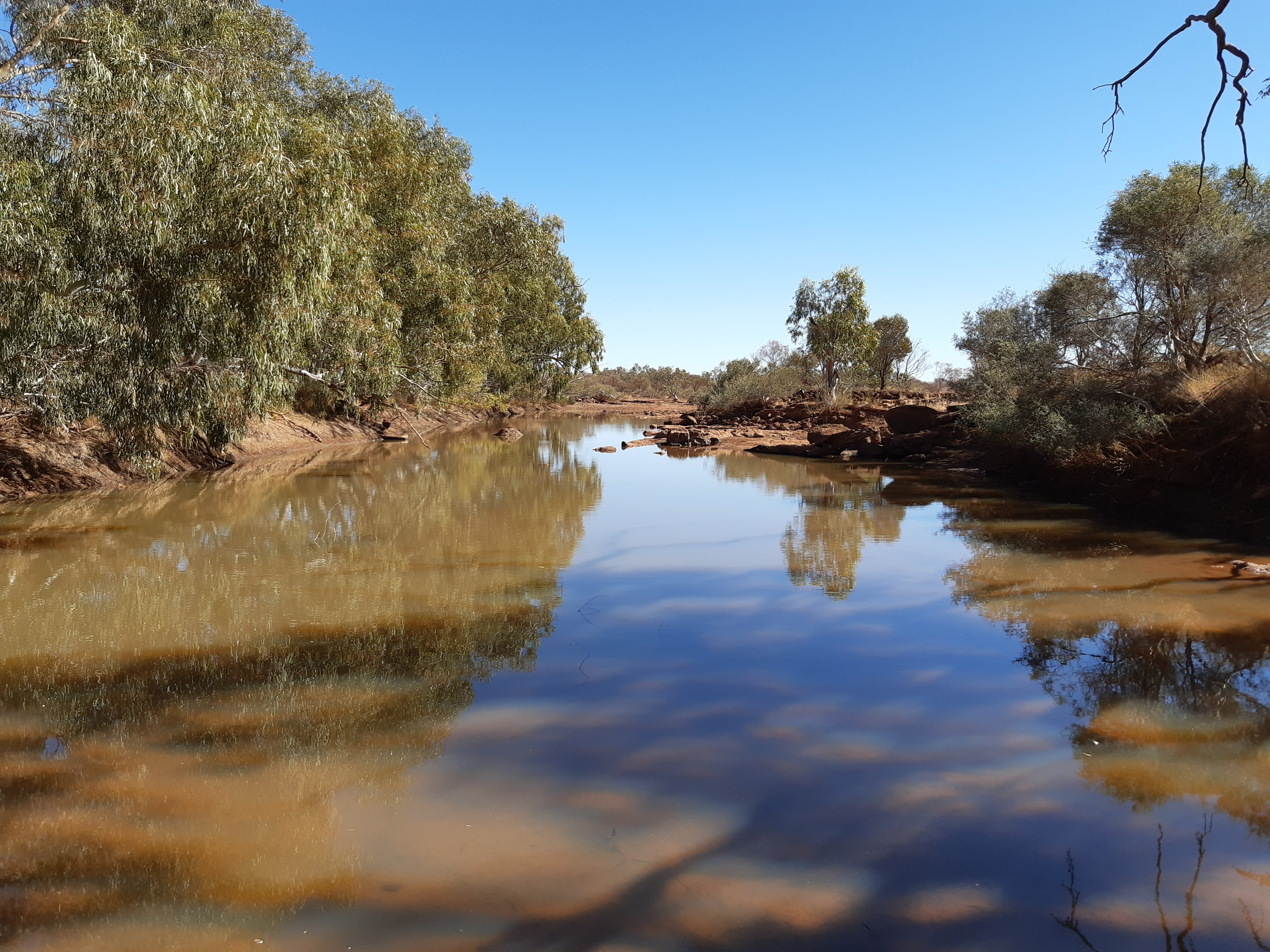
- The Landor River south of the Dalgety Downs-Landor Road crossing
- Etymology: Perth barrister, E. W. Landor

Location
- Country: Australia
- State: Western Australia
- Region: Gascoyne

Physical characteristics
- Source: Mount Erong
  - coordinates: 25°30′30″S 116°40′16″E
  - elevation: 383 m (1,257 ft)
- Mouth: confluence with the Gascoyne River
  - location: near Landor Station homestead
  - coordinates: 25°13′31″S 116°38′29″E
  - elevation: 346 m (1,135 ft)
- Length: 32 km (20 mi)
- Discharge
  - location: mouth

Basin features
- River system: Gascoyne River catchment
- Tributaries
  - left: Fleury Creek
  - right: Flinerty Creek

The Landor River is a river in the Gascoyne region of Western Australia.

The headwaters of the Landor rise north of Mount Erong and flow generally north, joined by two minor tributaries, Flinerty Creek and Fleury Creek. The river forms confluence with the Gascoyne River near the Landor Station homestead. The river descends 37 metres (121 ft) over its 32-kilometre (20 mi) course.

The first European to find the river was the surveyor, Henry Carey in 1882. It is thought that he named the river after a prominent Perth barrister, E. W. Landor.

== See also ==
- List of watercourses in Western Australia
