= Ptilotus crinitus =

Scientific classification
- Kingdom: Plantae
- Clade: Tracheophytes
- Clade: Angiosperms
- Clade: Eudicots
- Order: Caryophyllales
- Family: Amaranthaceae
- Genus: Ptilotus
- Species: P. crinitus

Binomial name
- Ptilotus crinitus R.W.Davis & T.Hammer

Species of grass-like plant

Ptilotus crinitus, commonly known as long-haired mulla mulla, is a species of flowering plant in the family Amaranthaceae and is endemic to the Northern Kimberley region of Western Australia. It is a rounded, ascending perennial herb or subshrub with narrowly lance-shaped or narrowly elliptic leaves, and spikes of greenish flowers with a pink tinge and three stamens.

== Description ==
Ptilotus crinitus is a rounded, ascending perennial herb or subshrub that typically grows up to 30–40 cm (12–16 in) high, and has mostly glabrous stems and leaves. The leaves are narrowly lance-shaped to narrowly elliptic, 5–20 mm (0.20–0.79 in) long and 0.4–0.8 mm (0.016–0.031 in) wide. The flowers are greenish with a pink tinge and borne in spikes of more than ten flowers, the spikes 30–100 mm (1.2–3.9 in) long. There are narrowly lance-shaped bracts 2.9–3.2 mm (0.11–0.13 in) long, and straw-coloured bracteoles with a prominent mid-rib. The outer sepals are 12–13 mm (0.47–0.51 in) long and tinged with pale pink, the inner sepals 11.5–12 mm (0.45–0.47 in) long and hairy on the lower surface. There are three stamens, the style is curved, 2.0–2.5 mm (0.079–0.098 in) long and the ovary 1.8–2.0 mm (0.071–0.079 in) long, 1.3–1.5 mm (0.051–0.059 in) wide and covered with silky hairs. Flowering has been observed in February and probably occurs between January and April.

== Taxonomy ==
Ptilotus crinitus was first formally described in 2021 by Robert Davis and Timothy Andrew Hammer in the journal Swainsona from specimens collected in the Northern Kimberley region in 2008. The specific epithet (crinitus) means 'long-haired', referring to hairs on the lower surface of the sepals.

== Distribution and habitat ==
This species of Ptilotus is only known from the type location where it grows on shallow sand near a beach in woodland with a grassy understorey.

== Conservation status ==
Ptilotus crinitus is listed as "Priority One" by the Government of Western Australia Department of Biodiversity, Conservation and Attractions, meaning that it is known from only one or a few locations where it is potentially at risk.

== See also ==
- List of Ptilotus species
