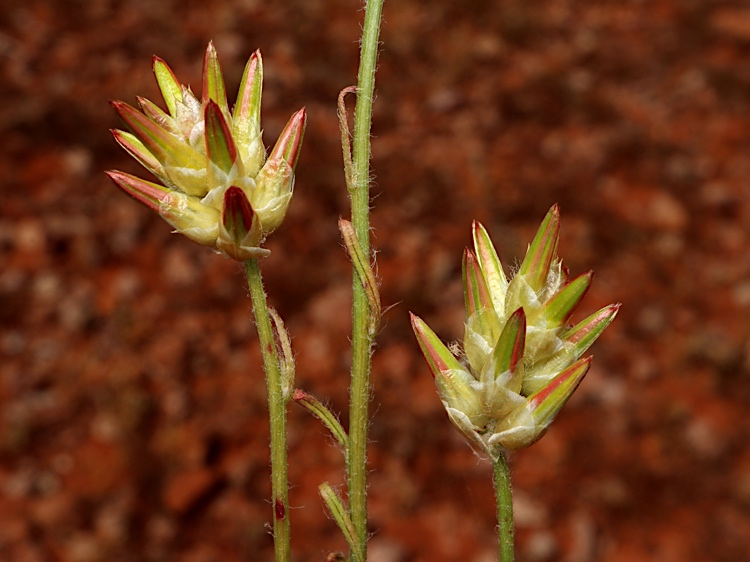

Scientific classification
- Kingdom: Plantae
- Clade: Tracheophytes
- Clade: Angiosperms
- Clade: Eudicots
- Order: Caryophyllales
- Family: Amaranthaceae
- Genus: Ptilotus
- Species: P. modestus

Binomial name
- Ptilotus modestus T.Hammer

Synonyms
- List: Hemisteirus psilotrichodes F.Muell.; Ptilotus gaudichaudii subsp. parviflorus (Benth.) Lally; Ptilotus gaudichaudii var. parviflorus (Benth.) Benl; Ptilotus hemisteirus F.Muell. nom. illeg., nom. superfl.; Trichinium corymbosum var. parviflora Benth. orth. var.; Trichinium corymbosum var. parviflorum Benth.; Ptilotus gaudichaudii auct. non (Steud.) J.M.Black: Council of Heads of Australasian Herbaria (2006)

= Ptilotus modestus =

Species of plant

Ptilotus modestus, commonly known as paper foxtail is a species of flowering plant in the family Amaranthaceae and is endemic to eastern continental Australia. It is an erect annual or short-lived perennial herb, with lance-shaped leaves at the base of the plant, more or less sessile stem leaves, and oval to hemispherical spikes of green flowers.

== Description ==
Ptilotus modestus is an erect annual or short-lived perennial herb that typically grows to a height of up to 20 cm (7.9 in) and has a sparse covering of hairs when young. The leaves at the base of the plant are more or less sessile, lance-shaped with the narrower end towards the base, 5–30 mm (0.20–1.18 in) long and 3–6 mm (0.12–0.24 in) wide. The stem leaves are more or less sessile, linear to narrowly lance shaped, 5–25 mm (0.20–0.98 in) long and 1–4 mm (0.039–0.157 in) wide. The flowers are green and arranged in an oval to hemispherical spike 12–24 mm (0.47–0.94 in) long and 15–20 mm (0.59–0.79 in) wide. There are broadly egg-shaped bracts 3–4 mm (0.12–0.16 in) long and broadly egg-shaped bracteoles 3.6–5 mm (0.14–0.20 in) long. The tepals are overlapping, 6–8.8 mm (0.24–0.35 in) long, green along the midline and whitish or opaque with a slight reddish tinge along the edges. The outer surface has short hairs along the midline, the inner surface with tufts of hairs on the edges. There are three or four fertile stamens and two staminodes, and the style is curved, 4.5–5.5 mm (0.18–0.22 in) long. Flowering mainly occurs from May to October, sometimes in February to April and November.

== Taxonomy ==
Ptilotus modestus was first formally described in 2018 by Timothy Andrew Hammer in Australian Systematic Botany. The specific epithet (modestus) means 'modest', "in reference to flowers that are smaller, less colourful and less widely gaping than the more showy flowers of P. gaudichaudii".

== Distribution and habitat ==
Paper foxtail grows on gravelly hills or rises and plains dominated by mulga shrubland and in eucalypt woodland, in the south of the Northern Territory and the western slopes and plains of New South Wales. It also occurs in Queensland and South Australia.
