= Ptilotus clivicola =

Scientific classification
- Kingdom: Plantae
- Clade: Tracheophytes
- Clade: Angiosperms
- Clade: Eudicots
- Order: Caryophyllales
- Family: Amaranthaceae
- Genus: Ptilotus
- Species: P. clivicola

Binomial name
- Ptilotus clivicola R.W.Davis & T.Hammer

Species of grass-like plant

Ptilotus clivicola is a species of flowering plant in the family Amaranthaceae and is endemic to the south-west of Western Australia. It is a prostrate perennial to upright herb with flat, lance-shaped leaves with the narrower end towards the base on the stems, magenta, oval or cylindrical spikes of flowers with five stamens.

== Description ==
Ptilotus clivicola is a prostrate to upright perennial herb that typically grows up to 10 cm (3.9 in) high, and has single stems arising from a hairy rhizome. The leaves on the stems are lance-shaped with the narrower end towards the base, 10–35 mm (0.39–1.38 in) long and 2–4 mm (0.079–0.157 in) wide. There are no leaves at the base of the plant. The flowers are magenta and borne in oval or cylindrical spikes 15–25 mm (0.59–0.98 in) long, 20–25 mm (0.79–0.98 in) wide. There are narrowly egg-shaped bracts 5.6–6.2 mm (0.22–0.24 in) long, and reddish brown bracteoles. The outer tepals are 14–16 mm (0.55–0.63 in) long and glabrous on the inner surface, the inner tepals 13–15 mm (0.51–0.59 in) long and glabrous on the inner surface. There are five stamens, the style is slightly curved, 1.7–2.1 mm (0.067–0.083 in) long and the ovary is glabrous, oval, 1.8–4.5 mm (0.071–0.177 in) long and 1.5–1.8 mm (0.059–0.071 in) wide. Flowering in late October and early November.

== Taxonomy ==
Ptilotus clivicola was first formally described in 2014 by Robert Davis and Timothy Andrew Hammer in the journal Nuytsia from specimens collected south of Eneabba in 2013. The specific epithet (clivicola) means 'slope-inhabiting', referring to the gentle rises where this species occurs.

== Distribution and habitat ==
This species of Ptilotus grows in heath on gently sloping rises on coarse sand in two separate locations - one near a sand mine south-east of Eneabba, and the other in Lesueur National Park, in the Geraldton Sandplains bioregion of south-western Western Australia.

== Conservation status ==
Ptilotus clivicola is listed as "Priority One" by the Government of Western Australia Department of Biodiversity, Conservation and Attractions, meaning that it is known from only one or a few locations where it is potentially at risk.

== See also ==
- List of Ptilotus species
