= Doolgunna =

Pastoral lease in Western Australia

Coordinates: 25.687°S 119.226°E

Location in Western Australia

Doolgunna or Doolgunna Station is a pastoral lease and sheep station located in the Mid West region of Western Australia.

It is located approximately 124 kilometres (77 mi) north east of Meekatharra and 263 kilometres (163 mi) south of Newman. The station occupies an area of approximately 325,000 acres (131,523 ha). The name of the property is Aboriginal in origin but the meaning is not known.

The southern branch of the Gascoyne River rises near the Doolgunna homestead.

Established at some time prior to 1927, Doolgunna was owned by G. J. Howard in 1929. The property was acquired by the Davies family in 1950.

In 2009 Sandfire Resources announced the discovery of a large high grade copper and gold deposit within the station boundaries at the DeGrussa tenement. The mine operated until 2022, powered off-the-grid by diesel, 10 MW solar and a 6 MW / 1.4 MWh battery. Other exploration companies such as Great Western Exploration, Ausgold and Thundelarra Exploration were quick to pick up adjoining tenements.

== See also ==
- List of ranches and stations
