= Landor Station =

Pastoral lease in Western Australia

Location in Western Australia

Landor or Landor Station is a pastoral lease and sheep station located in the Gascoyne region of Western Australia.

The station is situated approximately 130 miles (209 km) by air north west of Meekatharra. The distance by road is considerably longer, 236 miles (380 km) via the Great Northern Highway. The station occupies an area of 3,504 square kilometres (1,353 sq mi) and has double frontage to the Gascoyne River, Landor Creek, and Aurila Creek over a total distance of over 200 kilometres (124 mi), with the property mostly composed of flood plain country. It is well grassed with buffel, saltbush, bluebush, cotton bush, and other vegetation, including mulga, acacia, and currara.

== Background ==
The property was established before 1925 as a cattle station, then swapped to sheep. Approximately 12,00 sheep were shorn in 1925, with numbers increasing to 40,000 in 1926 and 50,000 in 1927. In 1998, the 4,050-square-kilometre (1,564 sq mi) property was acquired by Richie Brennan from Malcolm McCusker. In 2013, Brennan had reported that cattle worth A$500,000 had been stolen from the property over the last decade.

The station homestead is situated close to where the Landor River meets the Gascoyne River. Both the river and the station were named by the surveyor HS Carey, most likely after the barrister EW Landor.

The heritage-listed Nundigo well and stockyards are found on the station. They are located close to the boundary of Landor and Errabiddy station between the tributaries of Bubbagundy Creek and the soft country. The eastern side of the yard is surrounded by flood gums, while open scrub is found to the west. The yards were used by drovers as a staging area for cattle headed to the railhead at Meekatharra. They were deliberately built in soft country so that the cattle could be shod, so they could more easily cross the stony country that lay ahead.

== Landor Races ==
The Landor Races are an annual event held at the racecourse, which is currently 22 miles (35 km) north of the homestead (24.93912°S 116.97845°E). Originally, the racecourse was located about half a mile from the homestead. The racecourse has its own airstrip, stables, water and electricity supply, dance hall, dining room, and grandstand. The public campsite that is adjacent to the course has its own toilet and shower facilities. Races are held on the first weekend in October, coinciding with the school holidays.

The races were first held in 1921 when stockmen from stations in the area, such as Mount Augustus, Milgun, Mount Seabrook, and Erravilla, held a race on their day off to find who had the fastest horse. The races have been held almost continuously ever since, with races not being held for several years during World War II. No starting gates exist; all races are walk-up starts. The inaugural winner of the 1922 Eastern Gascoyne Race Club Landor Cup, run over a mile, was a horse named "Johnny the Gun". The winner of the 2012 Landor Cup was "Cathcart". The Landor Cup is currently run over 1,800 metres (5,906 ft).

== See also ==
- List of pastoral leases in Western Australia
