= Gascoyne River =

River in Western Australia

Gascoyne
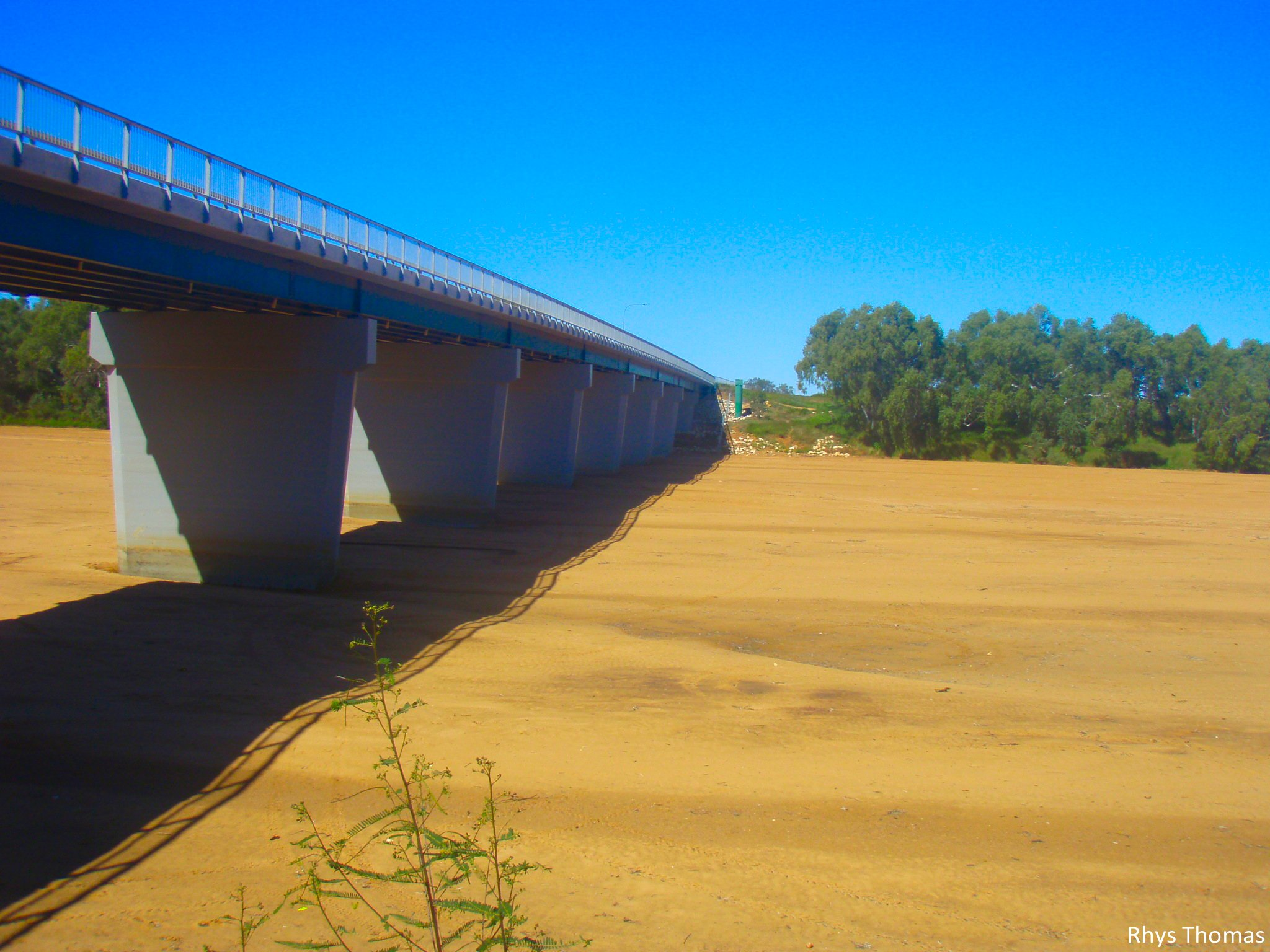
- The Gascoyne riverbed near Carnarvon
- Etymology: Captain John Gascoyne RN, son of Bamber Gascoyne

Location
- Country: Australia
- State: Western Australia
- Region: Gascoyne
- City: Carnarvon

Physical characteristics
- Source: Collier Range
  - location: Three Rivers Station
  - coordinates: 24°39′8″S 119°44′58″E
  - elevation: 514 m (1,686 ft)
- 2nd source: Gascoyne River (Middle)
  - location: west of Beyondie Lakes
  - coordinates: 25°20′42″S 119°38′53″E
- 3rd source: Gascoyne River (South)
  - location: near the Doolgunna homestead
  - coordinates: 25°41′45″S 119°13′17″E
- Source confluence: Gascoyne River (North)
  - coordinates: 25°18′29″S 119°6′42″E
- Mouth: Indian Ocean
  - location: Shark Bay
  - coordinates: 24°52′14″S 113°36′57″E
  - elevation: 0 m (0 ft)
- Length: 865 km (537 mi)
- Basin size: 76,254 km^{2} (29,442 sq mi)
- Discharge
  - location: mouth

Basin features
- Tributaries
  - left: Landor River, Thirty One River, Lyons River
  - right: Thomas River
- Natural pools: Tibingoona Pool; Bibbingoona Pool; Nungamarra Pool; Mibbley Pool; Mutherbukin Pool; Beelu Pool; Bilyarra Pool; Piddendoora Pool; and Gnardune Pool

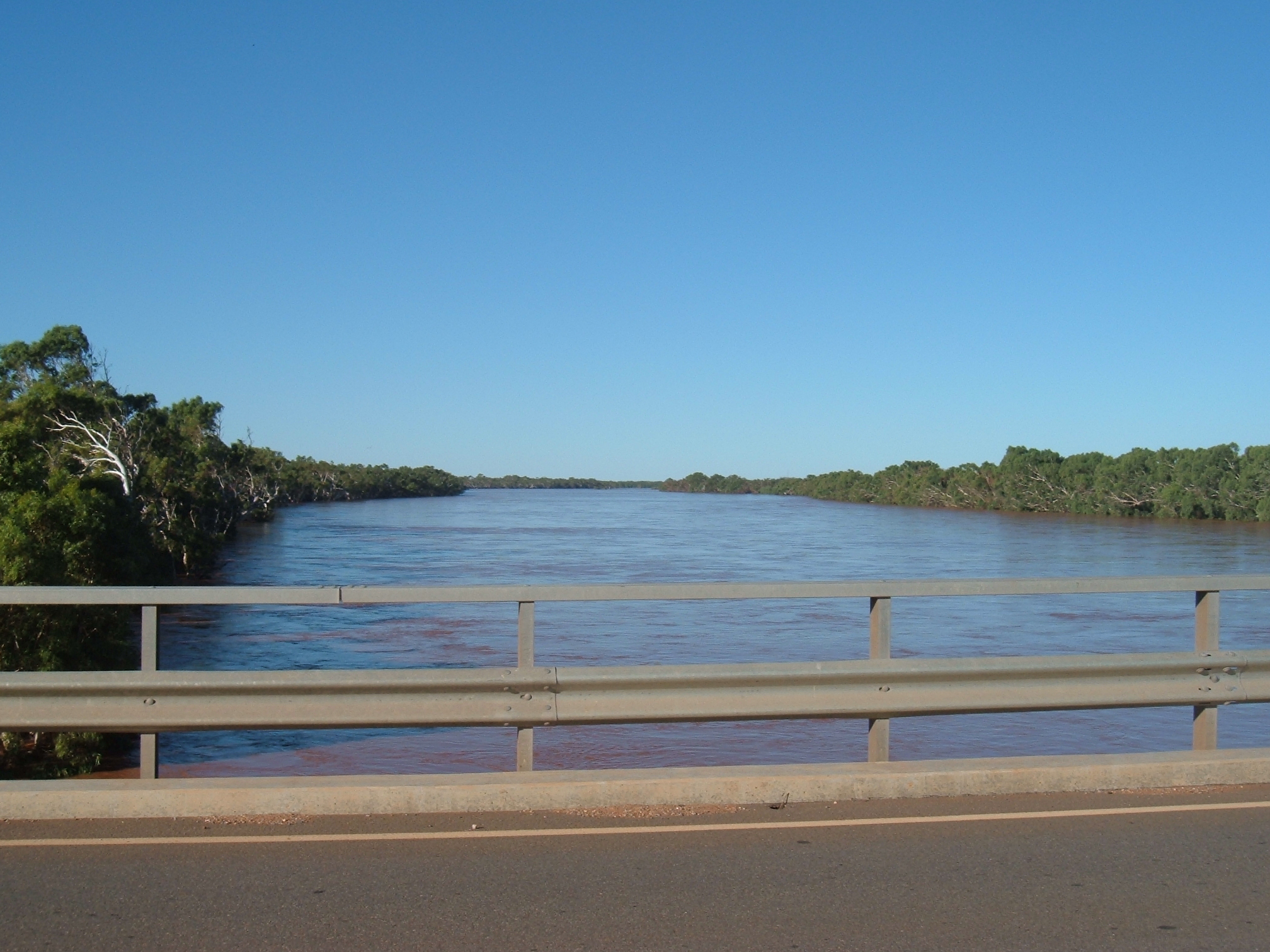
Gascoyne River in flood, 2006

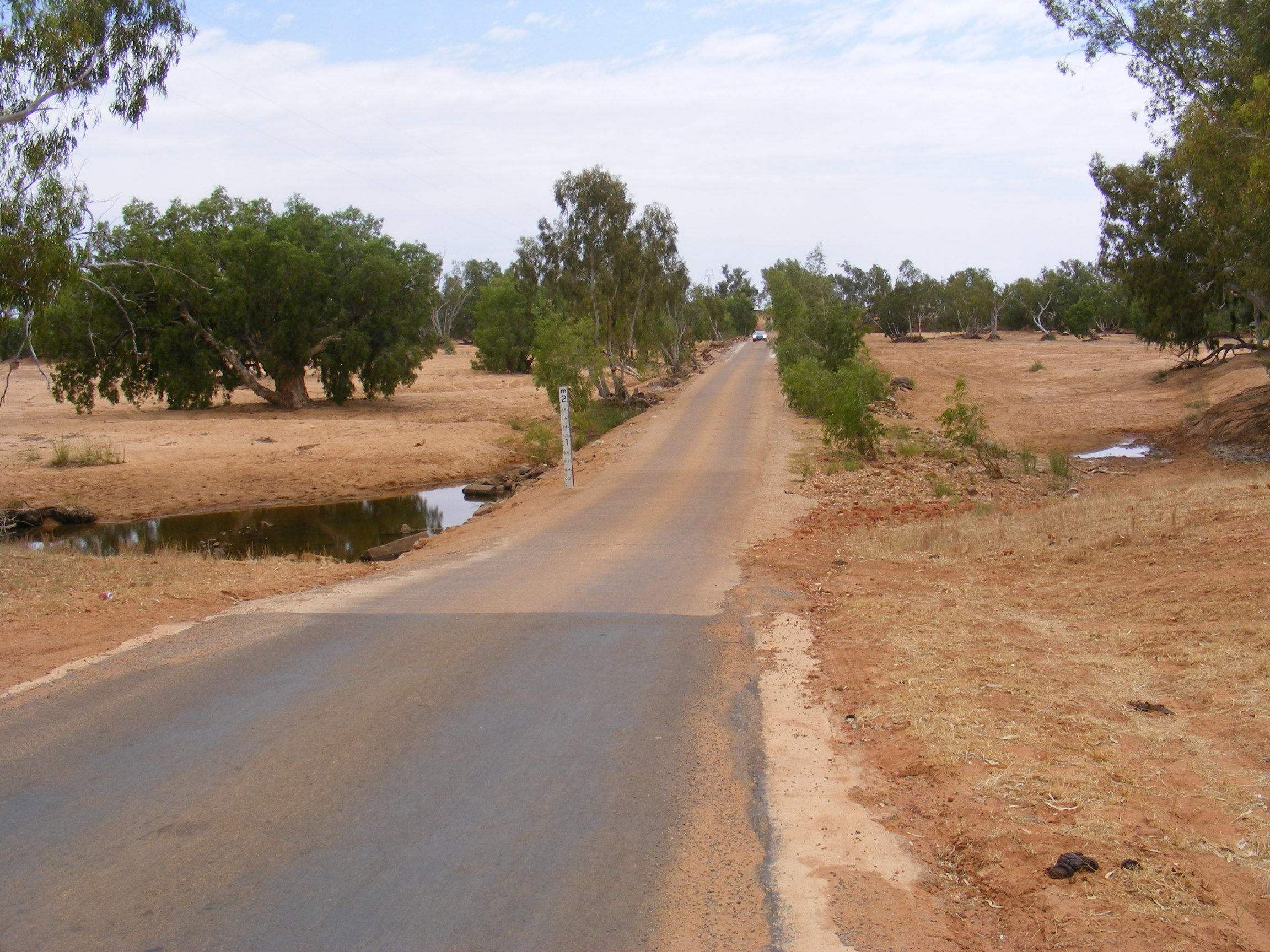
Gascoyne River crossing, 2007

The Gascoyne River is a river in the Gascoyne region of Western Australia. At 865 kilometres (537 mi), it is the longest river in Western Australia.

== Description ==
The Gascoyne River comprises three branches in its upper reaches. Draining the Collier Range, the river rises as the Gascoyne River (North Branch) on Three Rivers Station near the Great Northern Highway, 100 kilometres (62 mi) northeast of Peak Hill and flows for approximately 125 kilometres (78 mi). The Gascoyne River (Middle Branch) rises west of Beyondie Lakes, east of Kumarina and east of the Great Northern Highway and flows for approximately 15 kilometres (9.3 mi). The Gascoyne River (South Branch) rises near the Doolgunna homestead and flows for approximately 15 kilometres (9.3 mi).

The Gascoyne flows generally west by south-west and is joined by 36 tributaries, including the Lyons River, Landor River, Thomas River, and numerous other creeks and gullies. The two main rivers, the Gascoyne and Lyons together provide a catchment area of 68,326 square kilometres (26,381 sq mi) that lies entirely to the east of the Kennedy Ranges and extends some 480 kilometres (298 mi) inland. The river reaches its mouth as it flows into Shark Bay and the Indian Ocean at Carnarvon. The river descends 514 metres (1,686 ft) over its 865-kilometre (537 mi) course.

It is said to be an "upside-down river", because it flows for about 120 days of the year and below the dry river bed for the remainder of the year. It is, in effect, a huge water storage system with the river aquifer lying below the desert sands.

The Gascoyne flows through sparsely vegetated countryside which is used mainly for gold mining, and sheep and cattle grazing. It includes many permanent pools that are valuable to both stock and native species. Some of the main pools located along the river include Tibbingoona Pool, Mutherbokin Pool and Mibbley Pool.

== History ==
The extensive catchment of the Gascoyne River means that it flows through the country of a number of Aboriginal peoples, the principal ones being the Baiyungu, Yinggarda, Thudgari, Malgana and Wajarri.

The first Europeans to see the river, on 4 March 1839, were a party led by the explorer Lieutenant George Grey, who named the river after a friend, Captain John Gascoyne RN, son of Bamber Gascoyne, a Lord Commissioner of the Admiralty. Captain Gascoyne was a committee member of the London-based Western Australian Missionary Society and a member of the London Association for the Protection of the Interests of the Colony.

From mid 1909 to early 1913, the area had three dry years, with the Gascoyne River not running for any of that time, and Carnarvon had water supply problems as a result.

== Floods ==
The most severe flooding of the Gascoyne River occurred in December 2010. Triggered by record-breaking rainfall, amounting to over 6,000 percent of the monthly mean, 313.6 millimetres (12.35 in) and 5 millimetres (0.20 in) respectively, in just four days, the floods caused widespread damage in the region. The water reached record levels at three stations along the river, cresting at 15.53 metres (51 ft) near Fishy Pool.

Evacuation orders were issued for several towns affected by rising waters. The most substantial impact was felt in Carnarvon where entire homes were washed away. Following the disaster, emergency supplies and funds were distributed to affected residents to aid in restoring their livelihoods. Though no people died, an estimated two thousand head of cattle perished, and damage was estimated at A$100 million. The size of the flood, and the region it affected, created widespread problems.

In March 2015, Cyclone Olwyn affected the Gascoyne River and caused the most severe flooding since 2010.

== Gallery ==
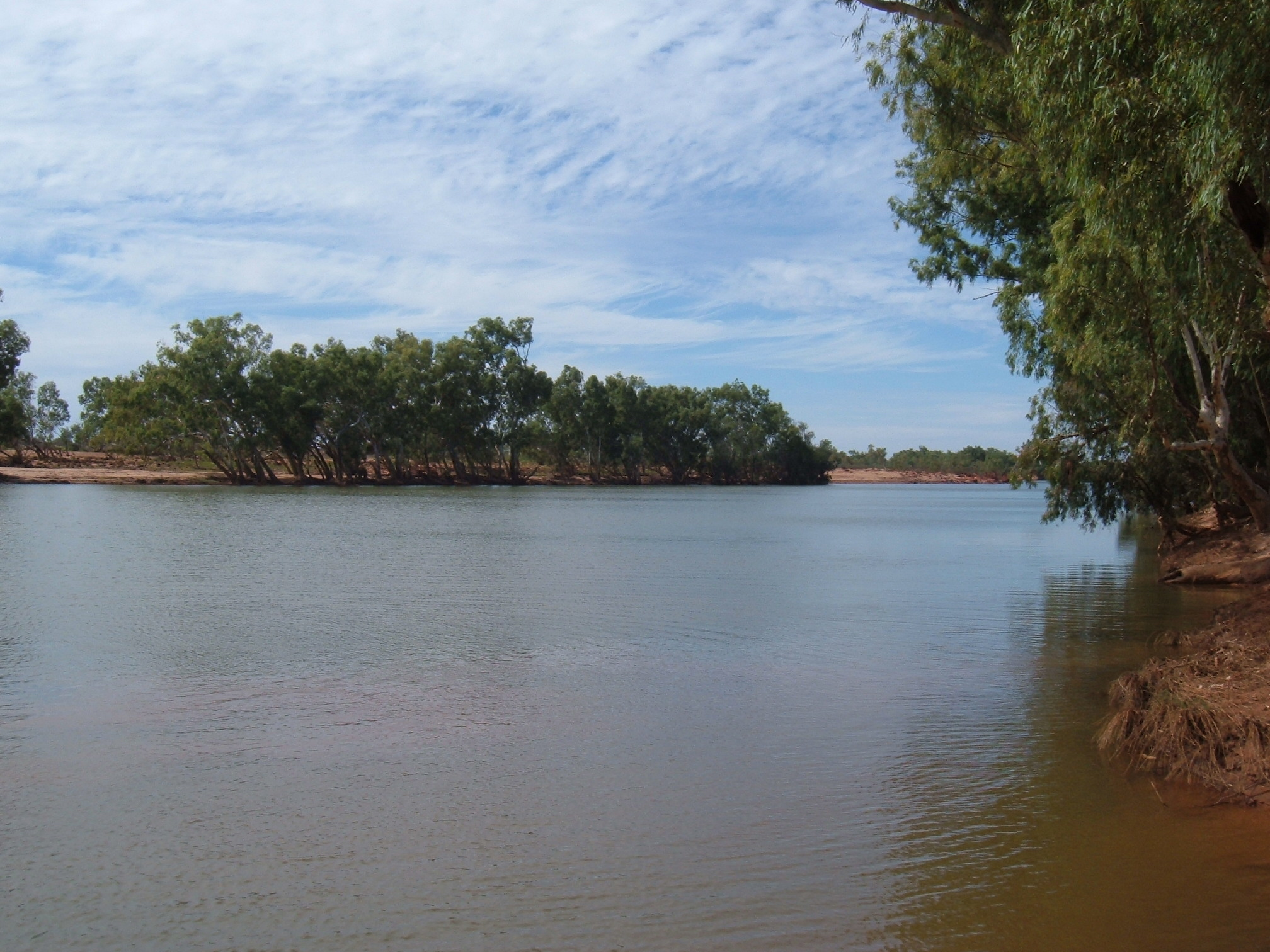
Rocky Pool, Gascoyne River, April 2006

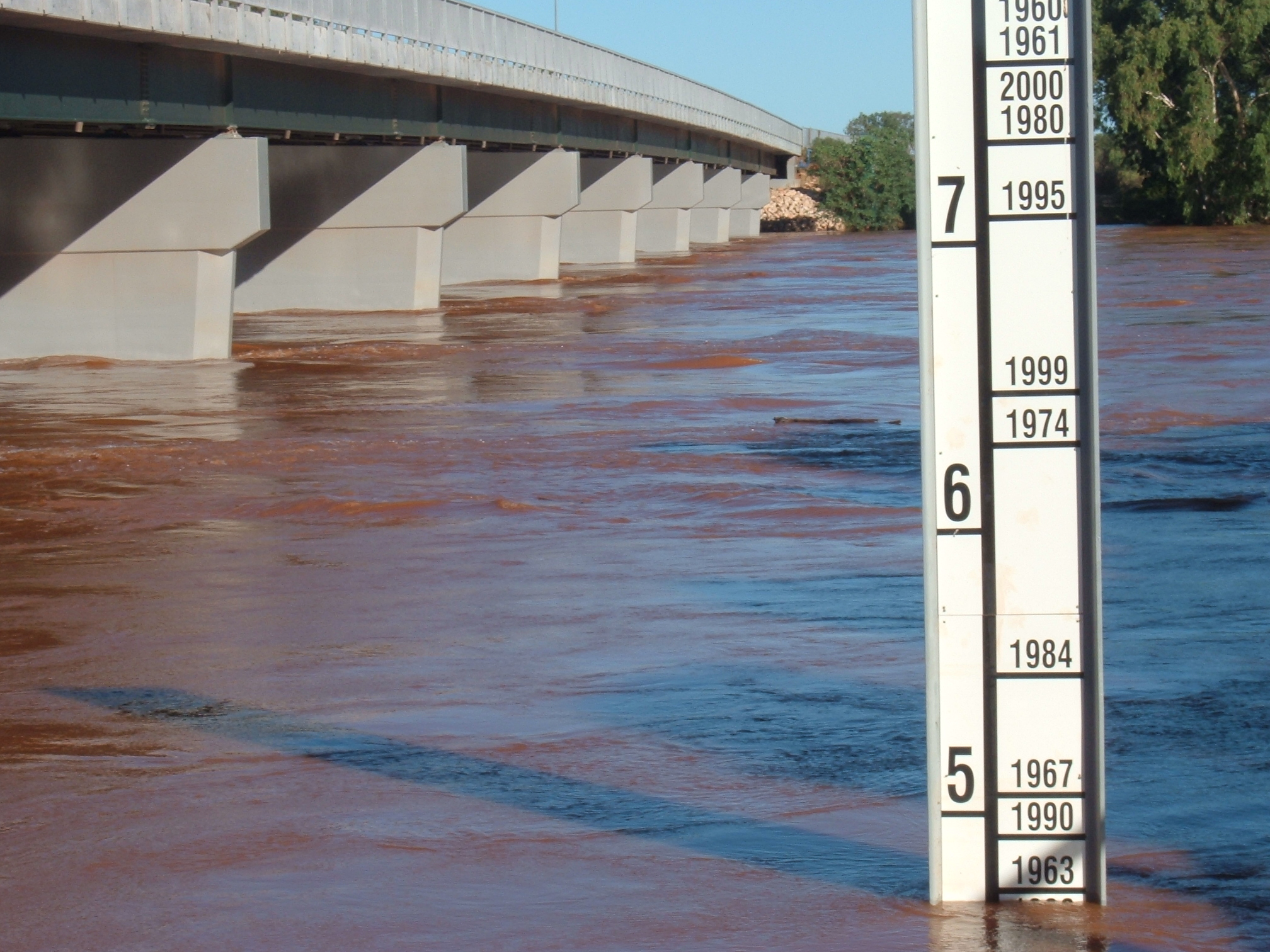
Gascoyne River in flood, April 2006

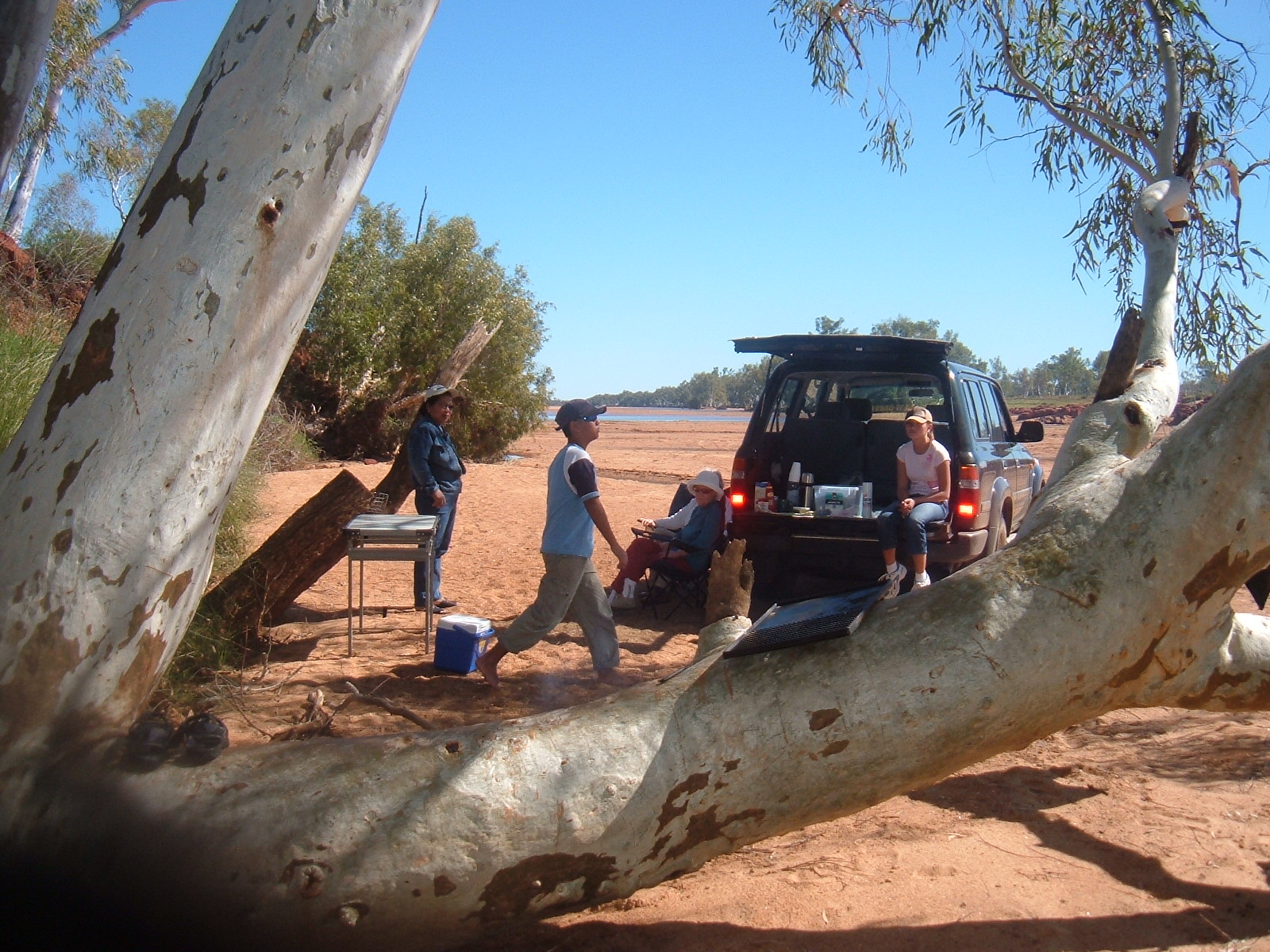
Dry Gascoyne riverbed, July 2005

== See also ==
- List of watercourses in Western Australia
