= Thomas River =

River in Western Australia

Thomas

Location
- Country: Australia
- State: Western Australia
- Region: Gascoyne

Physical characteristics
- Source: Teano Range
  - location: south of Double Peak
  - coordinates: 24°38′16″S 117°10′13″E
  - elevation: 463 m (1,519 ft)
- Mouth: confluence with the Gascoyne River
  - location: near Landor Station homestead
  - coordinates: 24°43′33″S 116°15′2″E
  - elevation: 294 m (965 ft)
- Length: 127 km (79 mi)
- Discharge
  - location: mouth

Basin features
- River system: Gascoyne River catchment

The Thomas River is a river in the Gascoyne region of Western Australia.

The headwaters of the river rise south of Double Peak and flows westwards, joined by two minor tributaries; Coondoondoo Creek and Pink Hills Creek. The river forms its confluence with the Gascoyne River near the Police Station Woolshed. The Thomas flows through the Murrumburra Pool on its way to the Gascoyne. The river descends 169 metres (554 ft) over its 127-kilometre (79 mi) course.

Significant gold and tin deposits have been found in the Thomas River Gascoyne gold fields.

== See also ==
- List of watercourses in Western Australia
