= Timothy Andrew Hammer =

Australian botanist (born 1984)

Timothy A. Hammer
- Born: 1984 (age 41–42); United States
- Education: Ph.D.
- Scientific career
- Fields: Botany, Taxonomy, Systematics
- Workplaces: State Herbarium of South Australia, University of Adelaide
- Author abbrev. (botany): T.Hammer

Timothy Andrew Hammer is an Australian botanist and plant taxonomist at the University of Adelaide and State Herbarium of South Australia. He was awarded a PhD from the University of Western Australia in 2019, completing a thesis on the taxonomy and systematics of Ptilotus and related genera in Amaranthaceae. In addition to Ptilotus, he has published taxonomic revisions and new species for the very diverse genus Hibbertia in the family Dilleniaceae, and he has authored the Flora of Australia treatments of Dilleniaceae, including the genera Dillenia, Hibbertia and Tetracera. In 2021, Tim Hammer and Kevin Thiele submitted proposals to amend the International Code of Nomenclature for algae, fungi, and plants to allow the rejection of offensive scientific names.

== Some taxa authored by T.Hammer ==
- Hibbertia advena T.Hammer & Toelken
- Hibbertia archeri T.Hammer & K.R.Thiele
- Hibbertia elachophylla K.R.Thiele & T.Hammer
- Hibbertia fulva T.Hammer
- Hibbertia hapalophylla K.R.Thiele & T.Hammer
- Hibbertia hesperia T.Hammer
- Hibbertia micrantha K.R.Thiele & T.Hammer
- Hibbertia pendula T.Hammer
- Hibbertia remanens K.R.Thiele & T.Hammer
- Hibbertia scopulicola T.Hammer
- Hibbertia triquetra T.Hammer
- Paraerva T.Hammer
- Ptilotus actinocladus T.Hammer & R.W.Davis
- Ptilotus benlii R.W.Davis & T.Hammer
- Ptilotus clivicola R.W.Davis & T.Hammer
- Ptilotus crinitus T.Hammer & R.W.Davis
- Ptilotus davisii T.Hammer
- Ptilotus falcatus R.W.Davis & T.Hammer
- Ptilotus modestus T.Hammer
- Ptilotus ostentans T.Hammer & R.W.Davis
- Ptilotus psilorhachis T.Hammer & R.W.Davis
- Ptilotus xerophilus T.Hammer & R.W.Davis
- Ptilotus yapukaratja R.W.Davis & T.Hammer
- Swainsona katjarra R.W.Davis & T.Hammer
- Swainsona picta R.W.Davis & T.Hammer
- Wadithamnus T.Hammer & R.W.Davis
