= Callagiddy =

Pastoral lease in Western Australia

Coordinates: 25.051°S 114.028°E

Location in Western Australia

Callagiddy Station, commonly referred to as Callagiddy, is a pastoral lease that operates as a cattle station in the Gascoyne region of Western Australia. The name Callagiddy is a Kimberly name picked up on a droving trip by the original owner Dansy Powell. It means, like many Aboriginal place names, "plenty water" and is pronounced with a hard G (J). Why the name Callagiddy was significant to Powell is unknown, however he named his seventh child, "Amy Callagiddy Powell". The original homestead on Callagiddy was located in the north-east section of the property known today as "Old Callagiddy". It was later relocated "lock, stock and barrel" to the centre of the property, when the lease was expanded in 1918, where it stands today. It is situated about 41 kilometres (25 mi) south east of Carnarvon, 109 kilometres (68 mi) north east of Denham and 26 kilometres (16 mi) east of Great Northern Highway. On the north and west boundary is Brick House Station, north-east boundary Meeragoolia station, eastern boundary Ella Valla Station and southern boundary Edagee Station. The Gascoyne River is 30 kilometres (19 mi) north of the northern boundary and the coast 12.5 kilometres (7.8 mi) west of the western boundary. The long term average rainfall is 214 mm and the median average is 194 mm.

== History ==
In 1867 Dansy Powell (aged 5) arrived in Fremantle, Australia with his mother and sister Sarah to meet up with his father George Powell, from Herefordshire, England, who had been sent out as a convict (convict no 7821) for sheep stealing. In 1882 Dansy Powell arrived in the Gascoyne District with a survey party and shortly afterwards took up Meeragoolia Station. He then sold Meeragoolia to Dan Matheson and took up the Callagiddy country, which was the first portion of the area between Carnarvon and Wooramel to be taken up and stocked. In 1894 Powell married Ellen Matilda Bird, and their first child James was born at Callagiddy in 1896. They had nine children, all of whom except the last, Jessie, were born at the station. After the sale of Callagiddy in 1909 the family moved to Wagin, where they farmed over the generations until 2018. Records show in 1905 the property was owned by Messrs Powell and McNish, who were running sheep on Callagiddy. The partnership was dissolved in 1906 with Powell taking full ownership. Powell sold the property in 1909 to Messrs Jackman and Balston for £16,500; at the time it was stocked with 11,000 sheep. H. Farrar was appointed manager in 1910 of Callagiddy after three years at Minilya Station. Later the same year 10,000 sheep were shorn, producing 168 bales of wool.

A large portion of the property was burned in 1923 by bushfires. Surrounding properties, including Jimba Jimba, Boologooroo, Brick House, Minilya and Wandagee, also lost large areas of grassland in the blaze. More bushfires swept through the area in 1927, with Callagiddy, Brick House, Doorawarrah, Ella Valla and other properties all losing large areas of feed to the fires.

Jackman sold the property in 1930 for £37,000 to the Waite family. The 160,000-acre (64,750 ha) property was stocked with 16,000 sheep at the time. In 1969 Jim Waite sold the property to the Johnston family. Peter Johnston took over management of the family station in 1985 and had full ownership by 1987. The property was running Dorper and Damara sheep along with cattle, and had diversified into growing sweetcorn, sorghum and sunflowers.

The property was placed on the market in 2010 and sold to David Chown in May 2011; it occupied an area of 654 square kilometres (253 sq mi) with a high carrying capacity, 99.2 percent of the property being rated either very high or high under the government's rangeland ratings. The property suffered little damage from the 2010 Gascoyne River flood, or fires in 2012 (700,000 hectares of the Gascoyne burnt), but had substantial damage to infrastructure from cyclone Olwyn in 2015. In 2017 the western Gascoyne was in severe drought, with the lowest rainfall in recorded history. The property currently carries Hereford-cross cattle and has area suitable for horticulture with good artesian water supply having a salt content of only 219 gr/gal or 2812 mg/litre.

== See also ==
- List of pastoral leases in Western Australia
