= Minilya, Western Australia =

Location in Western Australia

Coordinates: 23.815°S 114.009°E

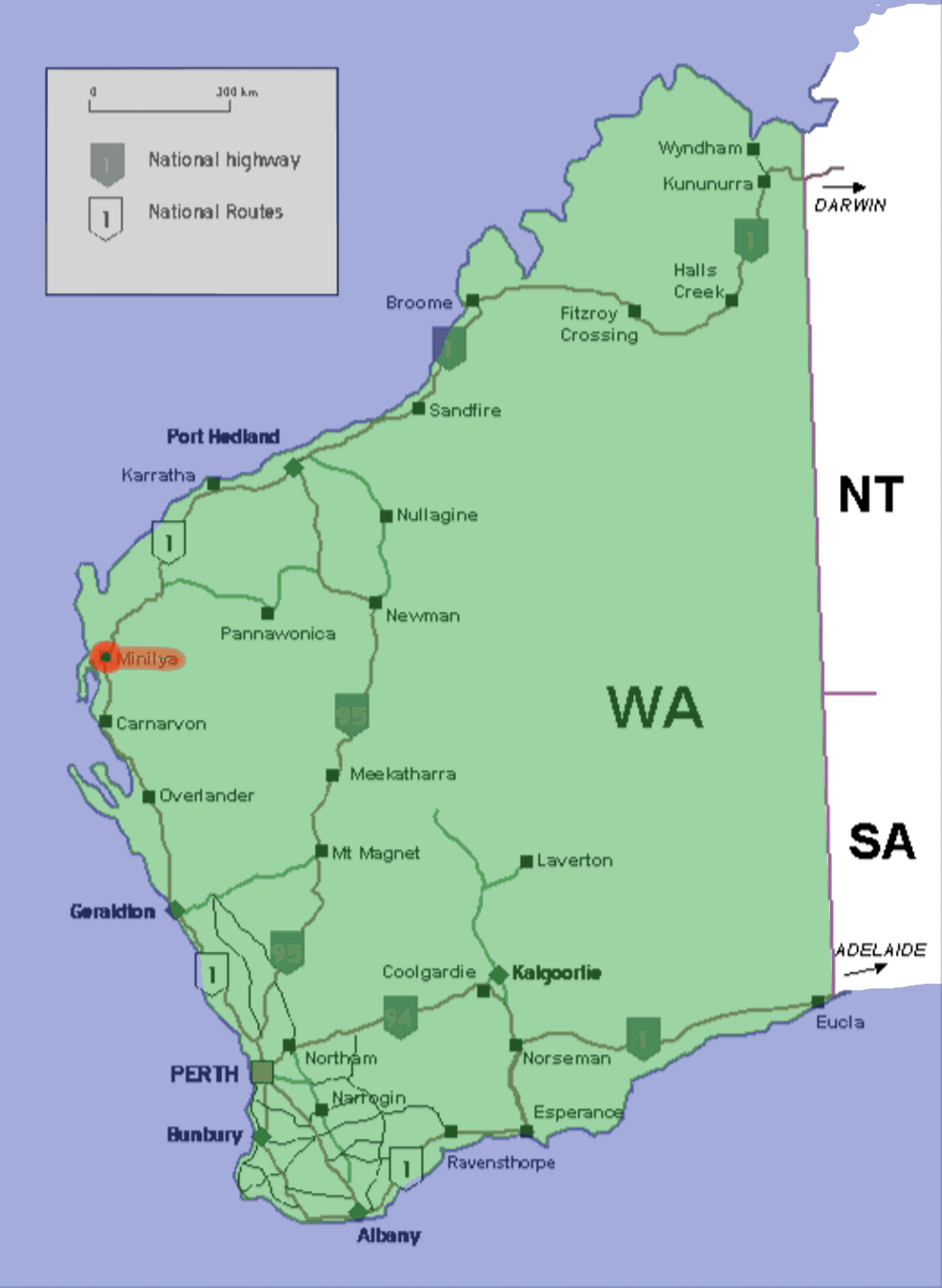
Location of Minilya in Western Australia (red)

Minilya is a location in Western Australia north of Carnarvon on the North West Coastal Highway. It is at a junction in the North West Coastal Highway, where the turn off to Exmouth is 220 kilometres (140 mi) from that location. The main highway then continues to the next junction 217 kilometres further, at Nanutarra Roadhouse.

At the 2016 census, Minilya had a population of 19, down from 137 in 2006.

Marsh Hill and the Lyndon River lie north of Minilya. The Lyndon River flows into Lake Macleod.

Charles Brockman and George Hamersley were the first to visit the area, in 1876. Brockman and Hamersley named both the Minilya River (origin unknown, of an Aboriginal source) and the Lyndon River. The pseudonymous photographer Coyarre won multiple awards and was published in the Western Mail with her photographs of the area.

== See also ==
- List of roadhouses in Western Australia
- Minilya River
- Minilya Station
