= Leioproctus canutus =

Scientific classification
- Kingdom: Animalia
- Phylum: Arthropoda
- Clade: Pancrustacea
- Class: Insecta
- Order: Hymenoptera
- Family: Colletidae
- Genus: Leioproctus
- Species: L. canutus

Binomial name
- Leioproctus canutus Houston, 1990

Species of bee

Leioproctus canutus, or Leioproctus (Leioproctus) canutus, is a species of bee in the family Colletidae and subfamily Colletinae. It is endemic to Australia. It was described by Australian entomologist Terry Houston in 1990.

== Etymology ==
The specific epithet canutus (Latin: "white-haired") is an anatomical reference.

== Description ==
The male holotype body length is 7 mm. Integumental colouration is mainly dark brown to black; the hair is white.

== Distribution and habitat ==
The species occurs in Western Australia. The type locality is Meedo homestead in the Gascoyne region.

== Behaviour ==
The adults are flying mellivores. Flowering plants visited by the bees include Eremophila maitlandii.

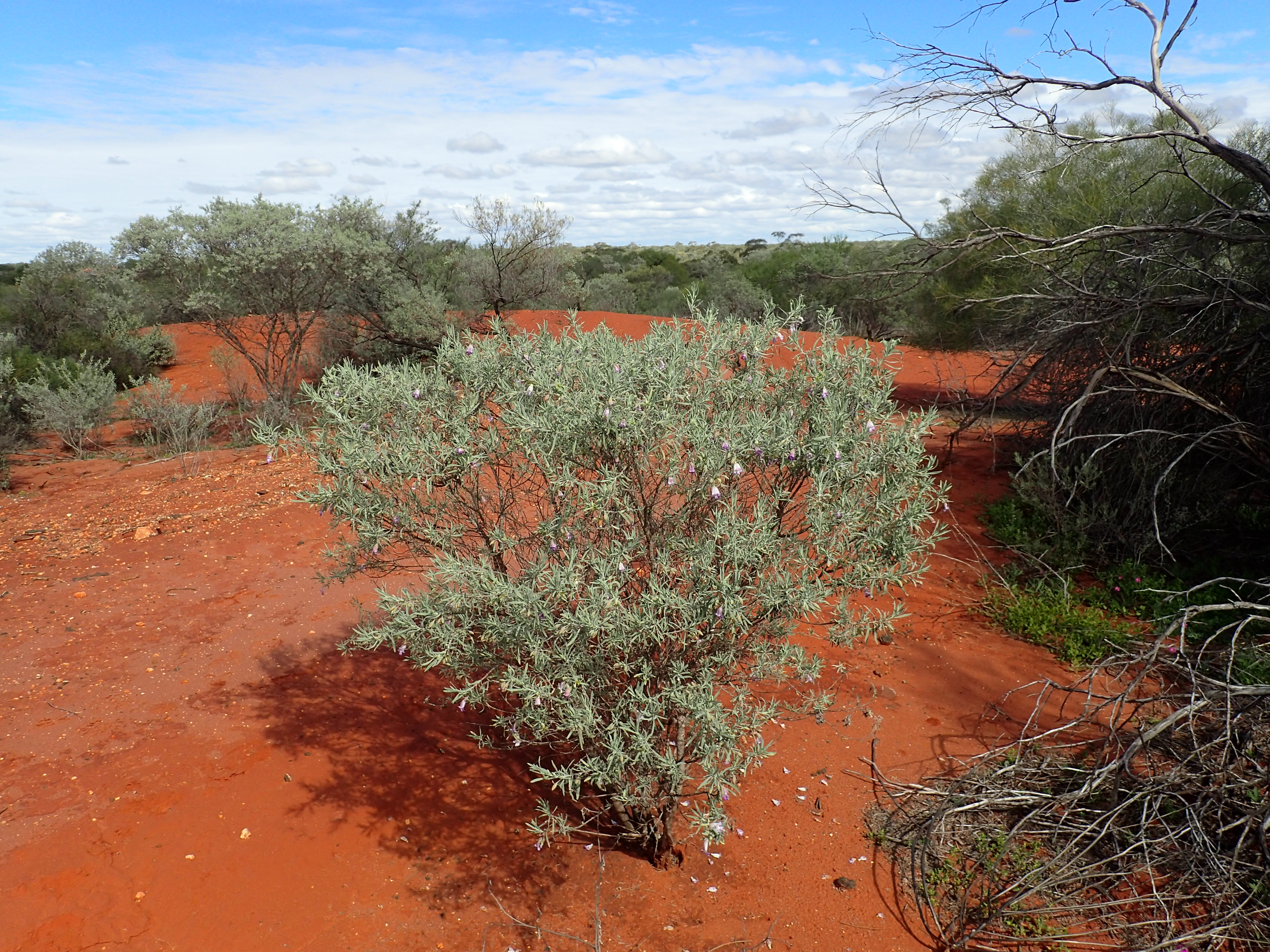
Eremophila maitlandii (Shark Bay poverty bush), a forage plant of the bees

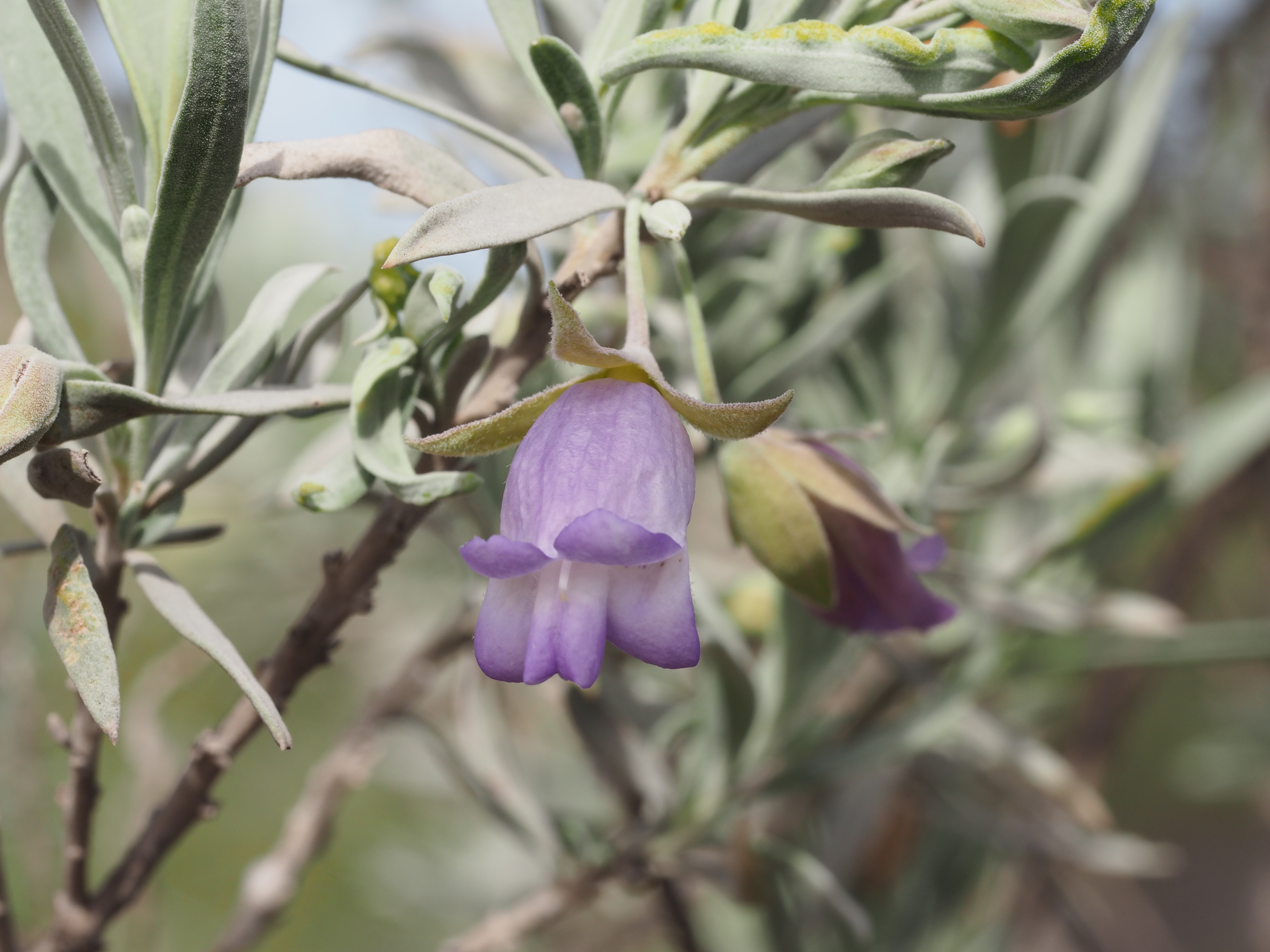
Eremophila maitlandii flowers
