= Doorawarrah =

Pastoral lease in Western Australia

Coordinates: 24.809°S 114.434°E

Location in Western Australia

Doorawarrah Station, commonly referred to as Doorawarrah, is a pastoral lease that operates as a cattle station in Western Australia.

It is situated about 79 kilometres (49 mi) east of Carnarvon and 196 kilometres (122 mi) south of Coral Bay in the Gascoyne region. Doorawarrah is bounded to the west by Brick House Station and has 80 kilometres (50 mi) of double frontage to the Gascoyne River.

In 1890 the property was acquired by James Munro, who developed the property over many years.

In 1905 approximately 32,000 sheep were shorn at Doorawarrah. By 1908 the flock size had increased to 36,368, and 558 bales of wool were produced from shearing. 42,459 sheep were clipped in 1910, yielding 768 bales. The area had three dry years from mid 1909 to early 1913, with the Gascoyne River not running for any of that time.

Munro sold Doorawarrah and took up the Pallinup Estate near Gnowangerup. Reginald George Burt who had once managed neighbouring Brick House Station acquired Doorawarrah and the 33,000 sheep the property was stocked with in 1922 and retained possession until his death in 1957. His daughter, Winsome Mabel Burt, maintained ownership of Doorawarrah until it was sold in 2009.

Massive bushfires swept through the area in 1927, with Doorawarrah, Brick House, Ella Valla, Callagiddy and other properties all losing large areas of feed to the fires.

The 2,197-square-kilometre (848 sq mi) property was sold for A$3 million in 2009 to a local pastoralist who owned two other properties in the area. The new owners, David and Geneveive Robinson, lost a few cattle from the property during the 2010 floods, but had a good season in 2011 after the rains broke a long drought.

In 2012 the area was threatened by bushfires that burned an area of 700,000 hectares (1,729,738 acres) in total. Doorawarrah and other stations such as Jimba Jimba, Boolathana and Meedo all received bushfire advice warnings.

== See also ==
- List of pastoral leases in Western Australia
