= Acacia atopa =

Conservation status
- Priority Three — Poorly Known Taxa (DEC)

Scientific classification
- Kingdom: Plantae
- Clade: Tracheophytes
- Clade: Angiosperms
- Clade: Eudicots
- Clade: Rosids
- Order: Fabales
- Family: Fabaceae
- Subfamily: Caesalpinioideae
- Clade: Mimosoid clade
- Genus: Acacia
- Species: A. atopa

Binomial name
- Acacia atopa Pedley
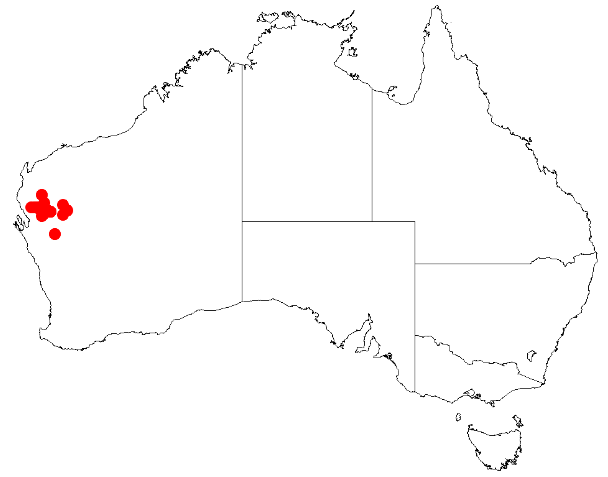
- Occurrence data from AVH

Synonyms
- Acacia atopa Pedley nom. inval.; Racosperma atopum (Pedley) Pedley

Species of legume

Acacia atopa is a species of flowering plant in the family Fabaceae and is endemic to a small area in the west of Western Australia. It is slender, occasionally weeping tree with linear phyllodes that are circular in cross section, cylindrical spikes of flowers, and linear pods up to 35 mm (1.4 in) long.

== Description ==
Acacia atopa is a slender, occasionally weeping tree that typically grows to a height of up to 4.5 m (15 ft). Its branchlets are slender with white hairs pressed against the surface between brown resinous ribs. Its phyllodes are linear, circular in cross section, 60–120 mm (2.4–4.7 in) long and 0.7–11 mm (0.028–0.433 in) wide and striated with longitudinal, resinous ribs. The flowers are arranged in cylindrical spikes about 20 mm (0.79 in) long in axils, on a peduncle 4–8 mm (0.16–0.31 in) long. Flowering occurs in August and September, and the fruit is a linear pod, up to 35 mm (1.4 in) long, 2–4 mm (0.079–0.157 in) wide and square in cross section.

== Taxonomy ==
Acacia atopa was first formally described in 2001 by Leslie Pedley in the Flora of Australia from specimens collected south of Winderie Station in 1973. The specific epithet (atopa) means 'strange' or 'anomalous', referring to the species being without close relatives.

== Distribution and habitat ==
This species of Acacia grows in clay or clay loam, sometimes in rocky situations, in a small area near Gascoyne Junction in the west of Western Australia.

== Conservation status ==
Acacia atopa is listed as "Priority Three" by the Government of Western Australia Department of Biodiversity, Conservation and Attractions meaning that it is poorly known and known from only a few locations but is not under imminent threat.

== See also ==
- List of Acacia species
