= Acacia pteraneura =

Scientific classification
- Kingdom: Plantae
- Clade: Tracheophytes
- Clade: Angiosperms
- Clade: Eudicots
- Clade: Rosids
- Order: Fabales
- Family: Fabaceae
- Subfamily: Caesalpinioideae
- Clade: Mimosoid clade
- Genus: Acacia
- Species: A. pteraneura

Binomial name
- Acacia pteraneura Maslin & J.E.Reid
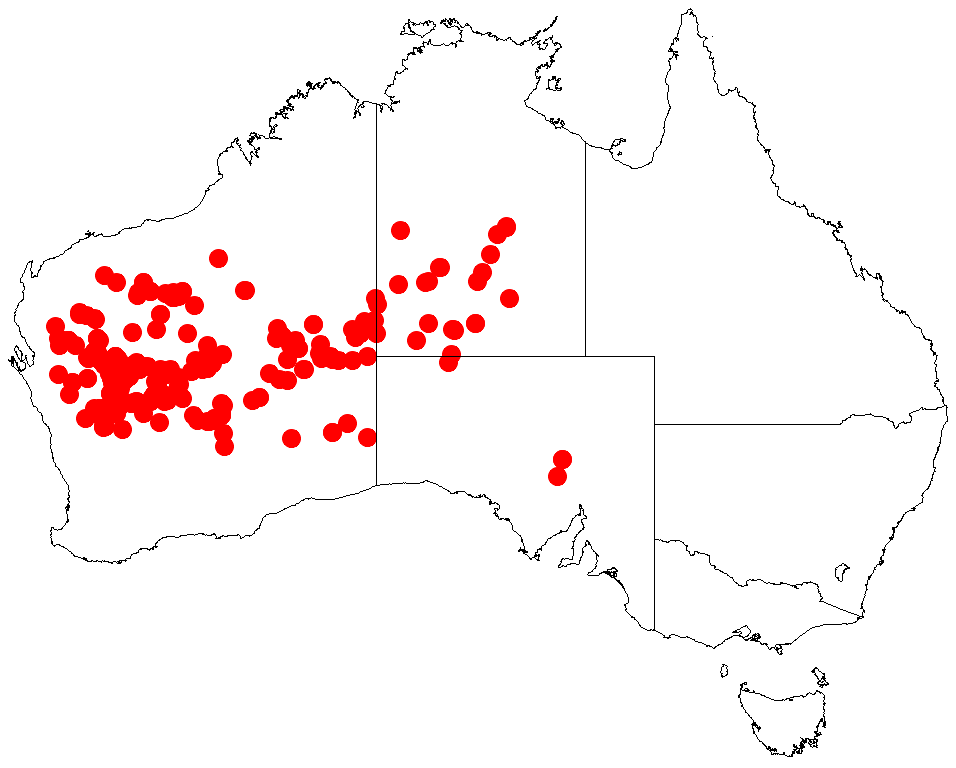
- Occurrence data from AVH

Species of legume

Acacia pteraneura is a shrub belonging to the genus Acacia and the subgenus Juliflorae that is endemic to arid areas of central Australia.

== Description ==
The plant either grows as a shrub to a height of around 3 m (9.8 ft) or as a tree with a height of 6 to 8 m (20 to 26 ft) that sometimes resembles a conifer and has straightish to crooked trunks and main branches. The hoary red-brown to dark grey branchlets have resinous or non-resinous ribs at the extremities. Like most species of Acacia it has phyllodes rather than true leaves. The evergreen phyllodes have a green to grey-green colour are sometimes curved to sinuous or have a sigmoid shape with a length of 40 to 100 mm (1.6 to 3.9 in) that appear in clusters of two to five on juvenile plants.

== Distribution ==
It is native to the Pilbara, Mid West and Goldfields regions of Western Australia. where the bulk of the population is found from around Gascoyne Junction in the west to around Yalgoo and then extending east into the Northern Territory and South Australia where it is found in many different types of habitats but usually situated on stony plains growing in sandy loam, clay or sandy soils commonly over hardpan as a part of mixed open Mulga shrubland or woodland communities.

== See also ==
- List of Acacia species
