= Boologooroo =

Pastoral lease in Western Australia

Coordinates: 24.335°S 114.033°E

Location in Western Australia

Boologooroo Station, commonly referred to as Boologooroo, is a pastoral lease that operates as a sheep station in Western Australia.

== Description ==
It is situated about 71 kilometres (44 mi) north east of Carnarvon and 137 kilometres (85 mi) south of Coral Bay in the Gascoyne region. The station is bordered to the south by Boolathana Station, to the north by Minilya Station and to the east by Cooralya Station. Lake MacLeod forms the western boundary of the station.

The property occupies an area of 741 square kilometres (286 sq mi), of which 653 square kilometres (252 sq mi) is described as being in good or fair condition. It has a carrying capacity of 10,500 sheep. The country is mostly alluvial plains with duplex soils and many sandy rises. The vegetation is mixed shrubland of currant bush, many acacias and some Gascoyne bluebush. The western portion of the station is made up of flat, saline alluvial plains that support salt bush, blue bush and taller acacia species.

== History ==
Boologoroo was established in 1894 by Robert Campbell. Campbell had previously taken up Beringarra Station in 1881 before acquiring Boologooroo. By 1906 the property was owned by Harry Campbell. Robert Campbell died of heart failure in 1909 and Harry took full ownership of Boologooroo.

A thunderstorm struck the station in 1911, and the windmill near the homestead was destroyed by the winds. 1.5 inches (38 mm) of rain fell in just over an hour and the temperature dropped from 112 °F (44 °C) to 70 °F (21 °C) in forty minutes. In 1923 the area was struck by a cyclone, with Boologooroo receiving 12 inches (305 mm) over a few days.

The area of the property in 1924 was 183,000 acres (74,057 ha) and it had a flock of 23,000 sheep in 1925.

The body of Jack Smith was found in the woolshed in an advanced state of decomposition in 1932. Smith had enquired about work of the station but then committed suicide in the shed.

In 2018 Boologooroo was sold to Gordon Cattle Company.

== See also ==
- List of pastoral leases in Western Australia
