= Brickhouse Station =

Pastoral lease in Western Australia

Coordinates: 24.821°S 113.786°E

Location in Western Australia

Brickhouse Station, formerly spelt Brick House Station, is a pastoral lease in Western Australia. It once operated as a sheep station but now operates as a cattle station, with some 90 ha (220 acres) turned over to mango cultivation .

It is located 15 kilometres (9 mi) north east of Carnarvon and 185 kilometres (115 mi) south of Coral Bay in the Gascoyne region. It occupies an area of 225,315 hectares (556,765 acres) with 60 kilometres (37 mi) of Indian Ocean frontage. The Gascoyne River runs through the property for 40 kilometres (25 mi) of its length and it is bounded to the east by Doorawarrah Station.

In 1888 the property was owned by Forrest, Burt and Co., who were sending consignments of sheep, including one of 2,040 sheep, to Frederick Piesse in Williams. A heat-wave during January 1896 produced temperatures as high as 125 °F (52 °C) in the shade, with hundreds of birds dying. No rain fell at the property between August 1896 and May 1897, and only 5 inches (127 mm) fell over the preceding 22-month period. By 1898 the station was being stocked up, taking delivery of 10,000 sheep from Mundabullangana station.

The first bores were sunk at the property in 1905. One bore recorded a flow of 5,000 US gallons (18,927 L) per hour when sunk to a depth of 1,200 feet (366 m). It was later sunk down to 1,360 feet (415 m) to obtain flows of 20,000 US gallons (75,708 L) per hour, which Burt found disappointing and insufficient for him to open up thousands of extra acres of land for stock.

A shearer named Lonton was murdered at Brick House in 1906 when another shearer named Fleming shot him in the chest in a drunken argument. Fleming committed suicide a few hours afterwards. During shearing later in October 189 bales of wool were produced from the 10,565 sheep sheared.

Following the death of Septimus Burt in 1919 the property was left to one of his four surviving sons, Reginald Edward Burt. Reginald had worked at Brick House from 1901 to 1903 as a station hand and became the manager in 1904, a position he held until 1922. He remained a co-owner of the station until his own death in 1957.

Massive bushfires swept through the area in 1927 with Brick House, Doorawarrah, Ella Valla, Callagiddy and other properties all losing large areas of feed to the fires.

Tragedy occurred at the station in 1971 when a light plane crashed during mustering, killing the two men flying.

The property has been flooded several times; severe flooding occurred in 1961 and in the flood of 2000 the water rose high enough to enter the kitchen by about 6 inches (152 mm). During the 2010 flood, water entered many of the outbuildings and the Burt family expected to lose about a quarter of the 5,000 head of cattle depastured on the property.

The station was owned or co-owned by the Burt family since the 1880s, but was put up for sale in 2013. The property was acquired by Andrew Forrest in 2015 along with Minilya Station for an estimated A$10 million, and is now spelt Brickhouse Station. In 2017 Forrest obtained approval to put 90 ha (220 acres) under irrigation to grow mangoes.

== See also ==
- List of pastoral leases in Western Australia
