= Cundlego Formation =

Lagerstätte formation in the Carnavon Basin, Western Australia

- Stratigraphic range: Cisuralian (Artinskian) 290.1–283.3 Ma
- Type: Geological formation
- Unit of: Byro Group
- Underlies: Quinnanie Shale
- Overlies: Bulgadoo Shale
- Thickness: 374 m (1,227 ft) (Type section); 394 m (1,293 ft) (Kennedy Range I); 412 m (1,352 ft) (near Gascoyne Junction)

Lithology
- Primary: Siltstone
- Other: Sandstone

Location
- Location: Gascoyne Junction, Western Australia
- Coordinates: 23.75833333°S 114.41666667°E (Type section)
- Region: Western Australia
- Country: Australia
- Extent: Carnarvon Basin
- Cundlego Formation (Australia) Cundlego Formation (Western Australia)

The Cundlego Formation, formerly known as the Cundlego Series is a Lagerstätte formation that dates back to the Artinskian stage of the Early Permian, between 290.1 and 283.3 million years ago. It is about 374 metres (1,227 ft) in thickness in the type section, along the Minilya River, north of Wandagee Hill; 394 metres (1,293 ft) at Kennedy Range I; and 412 metres (1,352 ft) near Gascoyne Junction. The Cundlego Formation is part of the Byro Group, as is the overlying Quinnanie Shale, and the underlying Bulgadoo Shale. Its rocks primarily consist of gray siltstone inter-bedded with fine to medium grained, cross stratified sandstone. Its strata were deposited during a storm sweep in a marine shelf. The formation is best known for its slabs of the crinoid Jimbacrinus bostocki, which have been preserved in densities of over 150 per square metre, notably in a 'trauma' position, as they were swept en masse via a storm into deeper waters, subsequently being rapidly buried by sediment, leading to the spectacular preservation of individuals in densities of 150 or more per square metre. However, this is only one of the formation's species, as its rocks also harbour bivalves, brachiopods, bryozoans, other crinoids, foraminifera and nautiloids.

== Geology, age and stratigraphy ==
The Cundlego Formation, at its type locality, consists mainly of siltstone with gray colouration, interbedded with swaley cross-stratified and hummocky sandstone, with little sign of bioturbation. Coquinas of discontinuous and thin nature derived from marine invertebrates are known. The formation is interpreted to be the result of deposition during a storm sweep, in shoreface to offshore environment, and many of the sand bodies within the sequence are calcareous.

In multiple locations, such as Cundlego Crossing for example, these are preserved as accumulated beds of fossils. The primary difference between this formation and the Bulgadoo Shale is understood as environmental differences, rather than evolutionary change. The Cundlego Formation is dated to the Artinskian stage of the Early Permian.

The Cundlego Formation is overlain by the open marine Quinnanie Shale, and overlies the also open marine Bulgadoo Shale. The latter of the two and the Cundlego Formation were assigned to Cycle II, one of four comparable shoaling upward parasequences within the Byro Group. Detached, exposed fossiliferous slabs in the bed of the Gascoyne River likely underwent transportation via periodic flooding, prohibiting the confidence in determining vertical and lateral relationships of the beds. Some exposures are preserved in situ and thus represent deposition in a shallow marine environment, which was subject to periodic storms. Shaley rip-up clasts, often linked to storm deposits such as tempestites and turbidites, are also recorded on some slabs.

== Distribution and thickness ==
The Cundlego Formation is only recognized in the Merlinleigh Sub-basin, between the Gascoyne and Minilya Rivers. As with other Byro Group formations, the Cundlego Formation has not been differentiated in petroleum-exploration wells, which have penetrated the Byro Group in the Gascoyne Sub-basin. It is doubted whether intersections in these wells were as high up stratigraphically as the Cundlego Formation.

The Cundlego Formation is seemingly relatively uniform thickness wise: 374 m (1,227 ft) in the type section, 394 m (1,293 ft) in Kennedy Range I, and 412 m (1,352 ft) near Gascoyne Junction. Smaller figures have been given for the eastern side of Kennedy Range, but these are due to subpar exposure and unidentified faulting.

== Paleobiota ==
The Cundlego Formation consists of a marine fauna of bivalves, brachiopods, bryozoans, cnidarians, other crinoids, foraminifera and nautiloids.

=== Asterozoa ===
Asterozoans of the Cundlego Formation
Genus	Species	Clade	Image
Ambigaster	wandageensis	Kermasida, Permasteridae	
Teleosaster	T. creasyi	Oegophiurida, Protasteridae	

=== Bivalvia ===
Bivalves of the Cundlego Formation
Genus	Species	Clade	Image
Glyptoleda	G. coleyi	Nuculanida, Nuculanidae	

=== Brachiopoda ===
Brachiopods of the Cundlego Formation
Genus	Species	Clade	Image
Demonedys	D. granti	Productida, Anopliidae	
Fusispirifer	F. cundlegoensis	Spiriferida, Trigonotretidae	
Gilledia	G. cf. homevalensis	Terebratulida, Gillediidae	
Heteralosia	H. (Etherilosia) prendergastae	Productida, Strophalosiidae	
Hoskingia	H. kennediensis	Terebratulida, Beecheriidae	
Neochonetes	N. (Sommeria) tenuicapillatus	Productida, Rugosochonetidae	
Neotornquistia (Formerly Tornquistia aff. T. tropicalis)	N. tropicalis	Productida, Anopliidae	
Quinquenella	Q. australis	Productida, Rugosochonetidae	
Retimarginifera	R. perforata	Productida, Productellidae	
Spiriferella	S. cundlegoensis	Spiriferida, Spiriferellidae	
Streptorhynchus	S. hoskingae	Orthotetida, Schuchertellidae	
Wyndhamia	W. multispinifera	Productida, Strophalosiidae	

=== Bryozoa ===
Bryozoans of the Cundlego Formation
Genus	Species	Clade	Image
Synocladia	S. spinosa	Fenestrida, Septoporidae	

=== Cnidaria ===
Cnidarians of the Cundlego Formation
Genus	Species	Clade	Image
Plerophyllum	P. sp.	Stauriida, Plerophyllidae	
Verbeekiella	V. mersa	Stauriida, Verbeekiellidae	

=== Crinoidea ===
Crinoids of the Cundlego Formation
Genus	Species	Clade	Image
Archaeoisocrinus	A. occiduaustralis	Isocrinida, Isocrinidae	
Jimbacrinus	J. bostocki	Ampelocrinida, Calceolispongiidae	Fossil of J. bostocki.
Neocamptocrinus	N. occidentalis	Monobathrida, Dichocrinidae	
