= Scaevola spicigera =

Scientific classification
- Kingdom: Plantae
- Clade: Tracheophytes
- Clade: Angiosperms
- Clade: Eudicots
- Clade: Asterids
- Order: Asterales
- Family: Goodeniaceae
- Genus: Scaevola
- Species: S. spicigera

Binomial name
- Scaevola spicigera Carolin

Species of flowering plant

Scaevola spicigera is a species of flowering plant in the family Goodeniaceae. It is a small, spreading shrub with white flowers and is endemic to Western Australia.

== Description ==
Scaevola spicigera is a spreading shrub to 50 cm (20 in) high and more or less hairy. The leaves narrowly oblong to elliptic to oblanceolate, usually more hairy on the lower surface, margins smooth, apex pointed, and gradually narrowing toward the base with a noticeable tuft of soft hairs. The bracteoles lance-shaped, 4–6 mm (0.16–0.24 in) long and up to 2 mm (0.079 in) wide. The white flowers are arranged in spike-like clusters up to 20 cm (7.9 in) long in leaf axils, corolla, 5–6 mm (0.20–0.24 in) long with more or less simple, soft, flattened hairs on the outside and short, soft hairs on the inside. The lobes are oblong-elliptic shaped, about 2.5 mm (0.098 in) long, about 0.5 mm (0.020 in) wide, wings less than 0.5 mm (0.020 in) long. Flowering occurs from June to February and the fruit is cylinder-shaped, 3 mm (0.12 in) long, wrinkled, covered in short, soft hairs, ribbed and mostly one-seeded.

== Taxonomy and taxonomy ==
Scaevola spicigera was first formally described in 1990 by Roger Charles Carolin and the description was published in Telopea. The specific epithet (spicigera) means "flower spike".

== Distribution and habitat ==
This scaevola grows on red sandy soils in grassland between Learmonth and Lake MacLeod.
