= Swainsona ecallosa =

Conservation status
- Priority One — Poorly Known Taxa (DEC)

Scientific classification
- Kingdom: Plantae
- Clade: Tracheophytes
- Clade: Angiosperms
- Clade: Eudicots
- Clade: Rosids
- Order: Fabales
- Family: Fabaceae
- Subfamily: Faboideae
- Genus: Swainsona
- Species: S. ecallosa

Binomial name
- Swainsona ecallosa Sprague

Species of legume

Swainsona ecallosa is a species of flowering plant in the family Fabaceae and is endemic to central Western Australia. It is an erect, single-stemmed, annual herb with imparipinnate leaves with about 17 narrowly egg-shaped leaflets, and racemes of purple flowers in racemes of up to 20.

== Description ==
Swainsona ecallosa is an erect, annual herb, that has a single stout stem up to 5 mm (0.20 in) wide arising from a slender taproot. The leaves are imparipinnate, mostly 70–100 mm (2.8–3.9 in) long with about 17 egg-shaped leaflets with their narrower end towards the base, the lower leaflets 15–25 mm (0.59–0.98 in) long and 4–12 mm (0.16–0.47 in) wide on with narrow stipules 2–3 mm (0.079–0.118 in) long at the base of a short petiole. The flowers are purple, arranged in racemes of up to 20 on a peduncle 2–3 mm (0.079–0.118 in) wide with bracts about 1.5 mm (0.059 in) long at the base. The sepals are joined at the base and hairy, forming a tube 3–4 mm (0.12–0.16 in) long with lobes up to twice as long as the tube. The standard petal is 15–20 mm (0.59–0.79 in) long, the wings about 10 mm (0.39 in) long and the keel 16–20 mm (0.63–0.79 in) long and 5–6 mm (0.20–0.24 in) deep. Flowering occurs from August to October and the fruit is a broadly egg-shaped pod 8–20 mm (0.31–0.79 in) long and 6–8 mm (0.24–0.31 in) wide.

== Taxonomy and naming ==
Swainsona ecallosa was first formally described in 1903 by Thomas Archibald Sprague in the Gardeners' Chronicle from specimens collected near the Minilya River. The specific epithet (ecallosa) means "without calluses", referring to this species lacking a callus on the standard petal, unlike others in the genus.

== Distribution ==
This species of pea grows in the Carnarvon bioregion of central Western Australia, sometimes in stony flats.

== Conservation status ==
Swainsona ecallosa is listed as "Threatened" by the Western Australian Government Department of Biodiversity, Conservation and Attractions, meaning that it is in danger of extinction.
