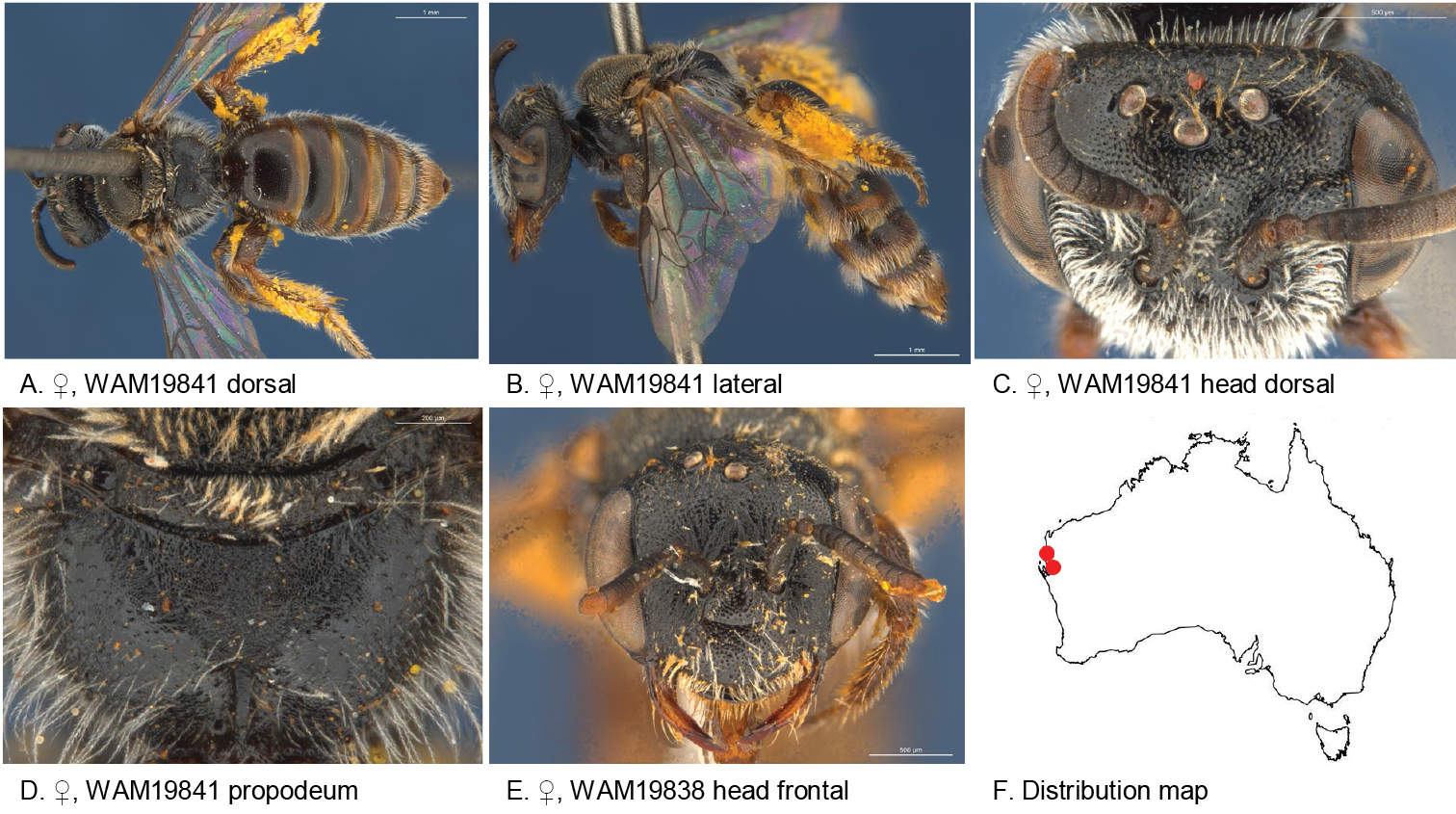
- Female holotype

Scientific classification
- Kingdom: Animalia
- Phylum: Arthropoda
- Clade: Pancrustacea
- Class: Insecta
- Order: Hymenoptera
- Family: Colletidae
- Genus: Leioproctus
- Species: L. longivultu

Binomial name
- Leioproctus longivultu Leijs 2018

= Leioproctus longivultu =

Species of bee

Leioproctus longivultu, or Leioproctus (Colletellus) longivultu, is a species of bee in the family Colletidae and subfamily Colletinae. It is endemic to Australia. It was described by entomologist Remko Leijs in 2018.

== Etymology ==
The specific epithet longivultu refers to the elongated face.

== Description ==
The female holotype body length is 6.3 mm, head width 2 mm. Integumental colouration is mainly black, orange and brown. The hair is mostly light brown.

== Distribution and habitat ==
The species occurs in Western Australia. The type locality is 7 km east of Boologooroo in the Gascoyne region.

== Behaviour ==
The adults are flying mellivores. Flowering plants visited by the bees include Parakeelya polyandra.
