= Charles Brockman =

Charles Brockman may refer to:

- Charles Samuel Brockman (1845–1923), explorer and pastoralist in Western Australia
- Charlie Brockman (1928–2005), American broadcaster
