= Boolathana Station =

Pastoral lease in Western Australia

Coordinates: 24°39′9.65″S 113°41′38.98″E

Location in Western Australia

Boolathana Station is a pastoral lease currently operating as a cattle station that once operated as a sheep station in Western Australia.

== Description ==
The property is situated approximately 26 kilometres (16 mi) north of Carnarvon and 167 kilometres (104 mi) south of Coral Bay in the Gascoyne region. The property is bounded by Quobba station to the west and the north. The homestead is situated on the banks of a large dam about 2 miles (3.2 km) long and 0.25 miles (402 m) wide. The country is mostly of a coastal nature with alternating sand ridges and salt bush flats. Several different native grasses, shrubs and the wattle variety Wanu provide good feed for stock. The station was one of the first in the district to bore for artesian water; one bore provides 1,500,000 imperial gallons (6,819,135 L) of water per day.

== History ==
The first Europeans to visit the area were an expedition led by Charles Brockman and George Hamersley in 1876. Brockman later established Boolanthana after acquiring the lease for 40,000 acres (16,187 ha).

In 1915, the drover Alf Cream took 2350 sheep from Boolathana and drove them overland for nine weeks to Meeberrie, another station owned by Butcher. The journey should have taken five weeks but the country was waterlogged following twenty consecutive days of heavy rain. The Wooramel River had risen 20 feet (6 m) and the drovers had to wait nine days to cross.

The property was sold in 1928 by James and Charles Butcher to Messrs Chenery and McIntyre for £130,000. By this stage Boolathana occupied an area of 390,000 acres (157,827 ha), was well watered by bores that provided over 3,000,000 imperial gallons (13,638,270 L) of water per day, and carried a flock of over 40,000 sheep.

In 1949 the property was owned by Harry Butcher, who was no relation to the previous owners; he acquired the property in 1947, about the same time that the area was struck by drought for a three-year period until good rainfalls were recorded in the winter of 1951. The property was a bird sanctuary by 1949 with large numbers of cockatoos living around the homestead. The 1949 shearing season was reasonably good with 25,000 sheep shorn. The record over the previous 30 years had been 50,000 with an average of about 20,000 per year.

In 2012 the area was menaced by bushfires that burned an area of 700,000 hectares (1,729,738 acres) in total. Boolathana and other stations such as Jimba Jimba, Doorawarrah and Meedo all received bushfire advice warnings.

In 2015 the station owners had to renegotiate the lease agreement with the state government, including having the government excise sections of pastoral land along the world-heritage listed Ningaloo Coast from the property, for conservation and tourism ventures.

== See also ==
- List of pastoral leases in Western Australia
