= Meedo =

Pastoral lease in Western Australia

Coordinates: 25.665°S 114.628°E

Location in Western Australia

Meedo Station, commonly referred to as Meedo, is a pastoral lease that operates as a cattle station in Western Australia.

It is situated about 113 kilometres (70 mi) east of Denham and 160 kilometres (99 mi) south east of Carnarvon in the Gascoyne region. The homestead lies along the Wooramel River and is about 40 kilometres (25 mi) from the North West Coastal Highway. Meedo shares a boundary with Wahroonga, Pimbec, Towrana, Yaringa and Wooramel Stations.

Occupying an area of approximately 1,465 square kilometres (566 sq mi) Meedo mostly consists of red sandplain country covered by thin mixed shrublands with denser stands of gidgee on the dunes. The property is capable of carrying a flock of 12,850 sheep but had flocks of up to 18,660 in 1970. During the drought of 1980 Meedo was only carrying 2,684 sheep.

The property was owned by John Henry Thomas Monger and William Felix Monger in 1900, having been established prior to that year.

Approximately 9,000 sheep were shorn at Meedo in 1906; a light clip was produced as rains had come late in the season. The total rainfall for the same year was about 6 inches (152 mm).

By 1908 the property was supporting a flock of over 10,000 sheep but had sold off the small herd of cattle that were on the property. Problems with wild dogs were becoming an issue.

William Felix Monger died in 1914, followed by his brother John Henry Thomas in 1920. In 1921 14,881 sheep were shorn, producing an average of 10.67 pounds (5 kg) of wool per sheep. By 1922 the property had been acquired by J.E. and N.M. Dempster.

A 70,298-acre (28,449 ha) portion of the lease was surrendered in 1951. In 1954 the Dempsters acquired another property, The Grange, for £100,000. The Grange, with an area of 19,600 acres (7,932 ha), was situated along the Irwin River and was to be run in conjunction with Meedo.

In 2012 the area was threatened by bushfires that burned an area of 700,000 hectares (1,729,738 acres) in total. Meedo and other stations such as Jimba Jimba, Boolathana and Doorawarrah all received bushfire advice warnings.

== See also ==
- List of pastoral leases in Western Australia
