= Cyclone Olwyn =

Category 2 Australian region tropical cyclone in 2015

Severe Tropical Cyclone Olwyn
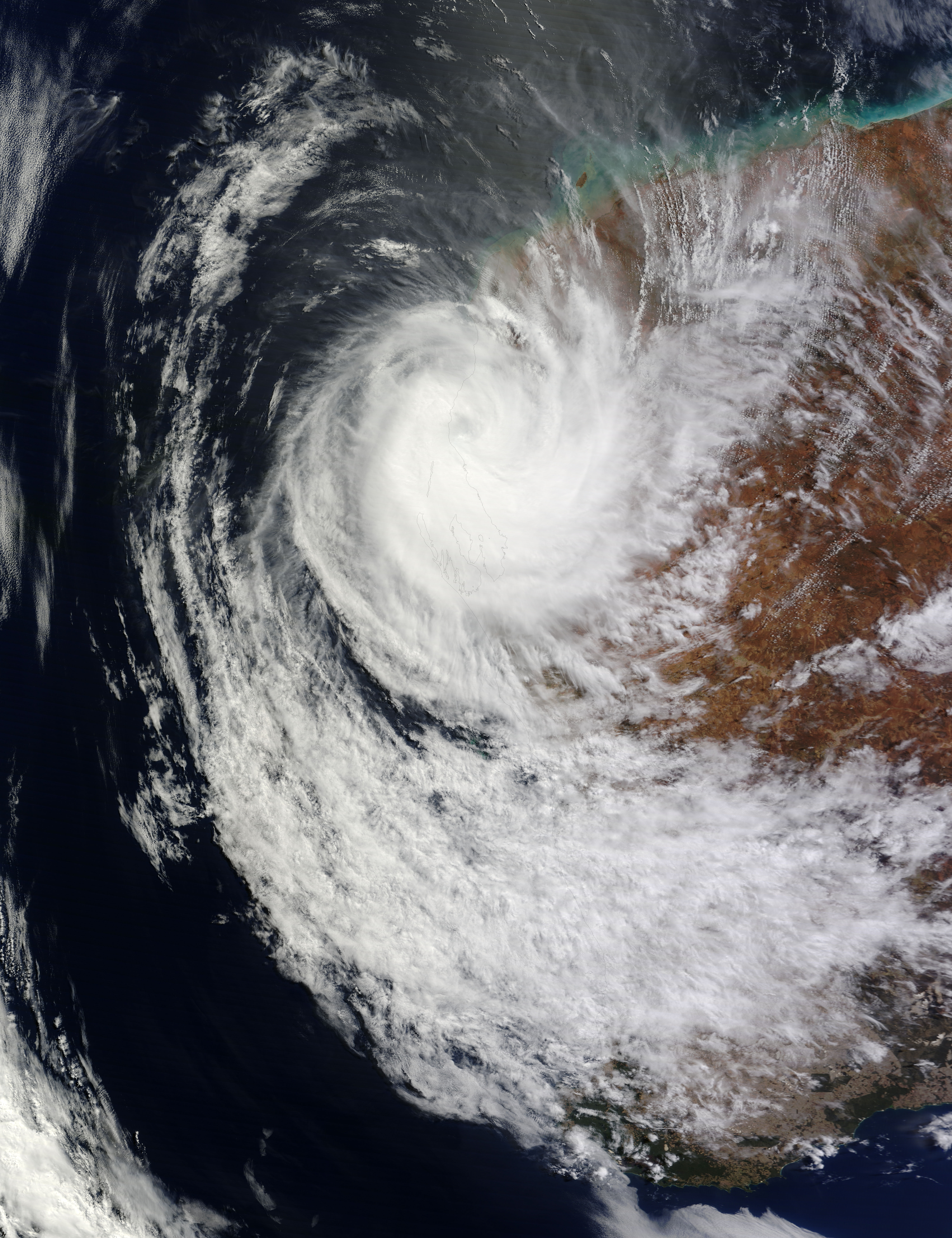
- Olwyn at its peak intensity on March 13, 2015.

Meteorological history
- Formed: 8 March 2015
- Dissipated: 14 March 2015

Category 3 severe tropical cyclone
- 10-minute sustained (BOM)
- Highest winds: 140 km/h (85 mph)
- Lowest pressure: 955 hPa (mbar); 28.20 inHg

Category 2-equivalent tropical cyclone
- 1-minute sustained (SSHWS/JTWC)
- Highest winds: 155 km/h (100 mph)
- Lowest pressure: 955 hPa (mbar); 28.20 inHg

Overall effects
- Fatalities: None
- Damage: $76.3 million (2015 USD)
- Areas affected: Western Australia.
- Part of the 2014–15 Australian region cyclone season

Severe Tropical Cyclone Olwyn was a strong tropical cyclone that caused extensive damage across the northwestern coast of Western Australia in March 2015. The twelfth tropical low, the sixth named storm and cyclone, and the fourth severe tropical cyclone; Olwyn formed from a weak tropical low over Western Australia on March 8. Olwyn rapidly intensified as it tracked south-southeast, reaching category 3 strength on March 11. The cyclone made landfall near Exmouth on March 13 as a category 3 cyclone, with winds of up to 185 km/h (115 mph). Olwyn weakened slightly after landfall, but continued to track south-southeast, bringing heavy rain and strong winds to coastal areas.

The cyclone caused extensive damage to infrastructure and property along its path. In Exmouth, the storm surge reached 1.8 meters (6 feet), flooding homes and businesses. The cyclone also caused widespread power outages and damage to roads and bridges. In the days following the cyclone, emergency crews worked to assess the damage and provide assistance to those affected. Over 1,000 people were displaced from their homes, and at least one person was killed. Damages were estimated to be in excess of US$76.3 million (A$100 million).

In addition to the damage to infrastructure and property, Cyclone Olwyn also had a significant impact on the environment. The cyclone caused widespread flooding and erosion and damaged coral reefs and mangrove forests. The full extent of the environmental damage is still being assessed. Despite the extensive damage caused by Cyclone Olwyn, the people of Western Australia showed great resilience in the aftermath of the storm. The community came together to help those who were affected, and the government provided financial assistance to help with the recovery.

== Meteorological history ==
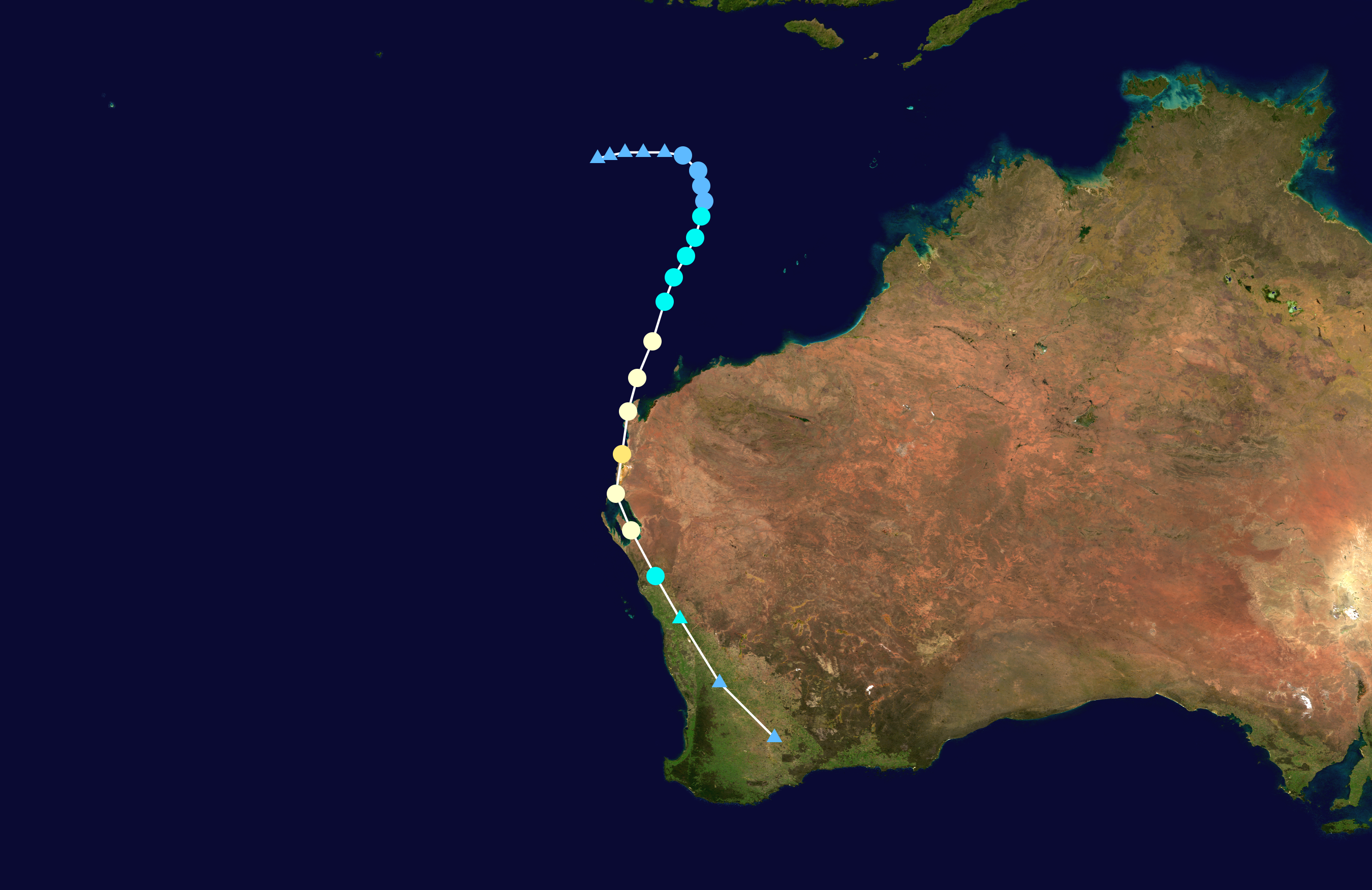
Map plotting the storm's track and intensity, according to the Saffir–Simpson scale Map key Saffir–Simpson scale Tropical depression (≤38 mph, ≤62 km/h) Tropical storm (39–73 mph, 63–118 km/h) Category 1 (74–95 mph, 119–153 km/h) Category 2 (96–110 mph, 154–177 km/h) Category 3 (111–129 mph, 178–208 km/h) Category 4 (130–156 mph, 209–251 km/h) Category 5 (≥157 mph, ≥252 km/h) Unknown Storm type Tropical cyclone Subtropical cyclone Extratropical cyclone, remnant low, tropical disturbance, or monsoon depression

Olwyn began as a weak tropical low in the monsoon trough off the coast of Western Australia on March 8, 2015. It slowly moved east at first, then turned south on March 10. It continued to track south while slowly strengthening and was upgraded to a tropical cyclone at 6:00 AM UTC (2:00 PM WST) on March 11.

Olwyn continued to move south-southwest, passing just west of Exmouth at 6:00 PM UTC on March 12. It reached its peak intensity of 75 knots (139 km/h) at this time, while located near North West Cape. Learmonth Airport reported sustained winds of 75 knots and gusts of up to 97 knots.

Olwyn continued to track south, passing just west of Coral Bay and then around 25 kilometers west of Carnarvon at 6:00 AM UTC on March 13. Carnarvon Airport reported sustained winds of 55 knots and gusts of up to 79 knots. Olwyn then turned to the southeast and crossed the coast over Shark Bay at 12:00 PM UTC on March 13. It had weakened below tropical cyclone strength by 12:00 AM UTC on March 14, inland of Geraldton.

Olwyn brought heavy rainfall to the western Pilbara and western Gascoyne districts. The heaviest rainfall was concentrated near the coast and caused localized flooding and road closures. The Greenough River and Irwin River catchments received widespread rainfall of 60 to 90 millimeters, which resulted in minor to moderate flooding.

== Preparations, impact, and aftermath ==
Olwyn caused extensive damage along the coast of Western Australia, from Onslow to Kalbarri. In preparation for the storm, the Pilbara Ports authority closed the ports of Dampier and Ashburton. The entire workforce on Barrow Island was evacuated to the island's cyclone shelter. 128 km/h (80 mph) wind gusts and 141.6 mm (5.57 in) of rain was recorded on the island as it was brushed by Olwyn. Upon landfall, a maximum wind gust of 180 km/h (110 mph) was recorded at Learmonth. Moderate property damage occurred at nearby Exmouth, with several houses being inundated with floodwater after 141.8 mm (5.58 in) of rain fell in 24 hours. Trees were uprooted and power was cut for several days. The Exmouth Yacht Club sustained heavy damage from Olwyn's storm surge. Damage was more severe further south at Carnarvon where most houses are not built to cyclone standards, unlike in Exmouth. Olwyn passed over the town at category 3 status, unroofing and severely damaging multiple houses, while many sheds and outbuildings were totally destroyed. The town's water and power facilities were damaged, leaving the area without water and electricity supplies for days. The entire banana crop in the Carnarvon area was destroyed by the storm's high winds and flooding. The Gascoyne River experienced its most severe flood since 2010 due to rains from Olwyn. One person sustained life-threatening injuries in a storm-related car accident, he was later on pronounced dead when he died in hospital from his injuries. Total damage in Carnarvon was estimated to be in excess of A$100 million (US$76.3 million), and Olwyn has been noted as the most severe cyclone to have hit the town since 1950.

A total of 121.8 mm (4.80 in) of rain fell in 24 hours at Shark Bay from Olwyn, setting a record for the highest amount of rainfall recorded in March at what is normally the most arid place on the Australian coast. Minor property and tree damage occurred in Denham. Further south, 8 mm (0.31 in) of rain and 76 km/h (47 mph) wind gusts were reported in Geraldton. The remnant low of Olwyn caused 15 mm (0.59 in) – 25 mm (0.98 in) of rain across the Wheatbelt, which was beneficial for farmers in the area. Perth recorded 12.8 mm (0.50 in) of rain and cooler temperatures as Olwyn's remnants moved into the Southern Ocean. On 15 March Olwyn's remnants brought severe storms to the Southern Western Australia. Olwyn was the first ex-tropical cyclone to affect Geraldton, the Wheatbelt region and Perth since Cyclone Iggy in 2012.

=== Retirement ===
Due to the extensive damage, the name Olwyn was retired. It was replaced with Oriana for future seasons.

== See also ==
- Tropical cyclones in 2015
- Cyclone Seroja – A powerful Tropical cyclone that had a track similar to Olwyn.
- 2014–15 Australian region cyclone season
