= Jimba Jimba Station =

Pastoral lease in Western Australia

Coordinates: 25.045°S 115.131°E

Location in Western Australia

Jimba Jimba Station, most often referred to as Jimba Jimba, is a pastoral lease currently operating as a cattle station in Western Australia, that once operated as a sheep station.

The property is situated near Gascoyne Junction, approximately 150 kilometres (93 mi) east of Carnarvon and 310 kilometres (190 mi) north of Kalbarri. The property has double frontage to an approximately 50-kilometre (31 mi) length of the Gascoyne River, and backs onto the Kennedy Range in the Gascoyne region of Western Australia.

== Description ==
The station was established in 1878 by G. Hamersley and S. Simms and occupied an area of 100,000 acres (40,469 ha). By 1885, the station had changed hands and was owned by Samuel James Phillips and his brother John H. Phillips.

Jimba Jimba was severely flooded along with surrounding properties including Erivilla and Clifton Downs in 1896 following heavy rains. The Gascoyne River and many of its tributaries broke their banks resulting in loss of stock.

By 1906 Messrs S. J. Phillips and Company owned Jimba Jimba and a total of 23,000 sheep were shorn producing 290 bales of wool.

Philip Ryan managed the station until 1907, when Douglas Philips, John Phillip's son, took over management of the property. In 1911 the property had a good shearing season with 400 bales of wool produced. Following the deaths of John and Samuel Philips the property passed onto Douglas in 1921. In 1926 approximately 19,000 sheep were shorn yielding 475 bales of wool.

A team of eight shearers led by Bill Young sheared 8,205 sheep in a 38½ hour week in 1954 at Jimba Jimba.

A seven-year drought was broken in 2010 when the area received its wettest day on record. This triggered massive flooding along the Gascoyne River, with water levels up to 17 metres (56 ft) above normal. Floodwaters almost surrounded the homestead, with people having to be winched from rooftops by a police helicopter.

== Geology ==
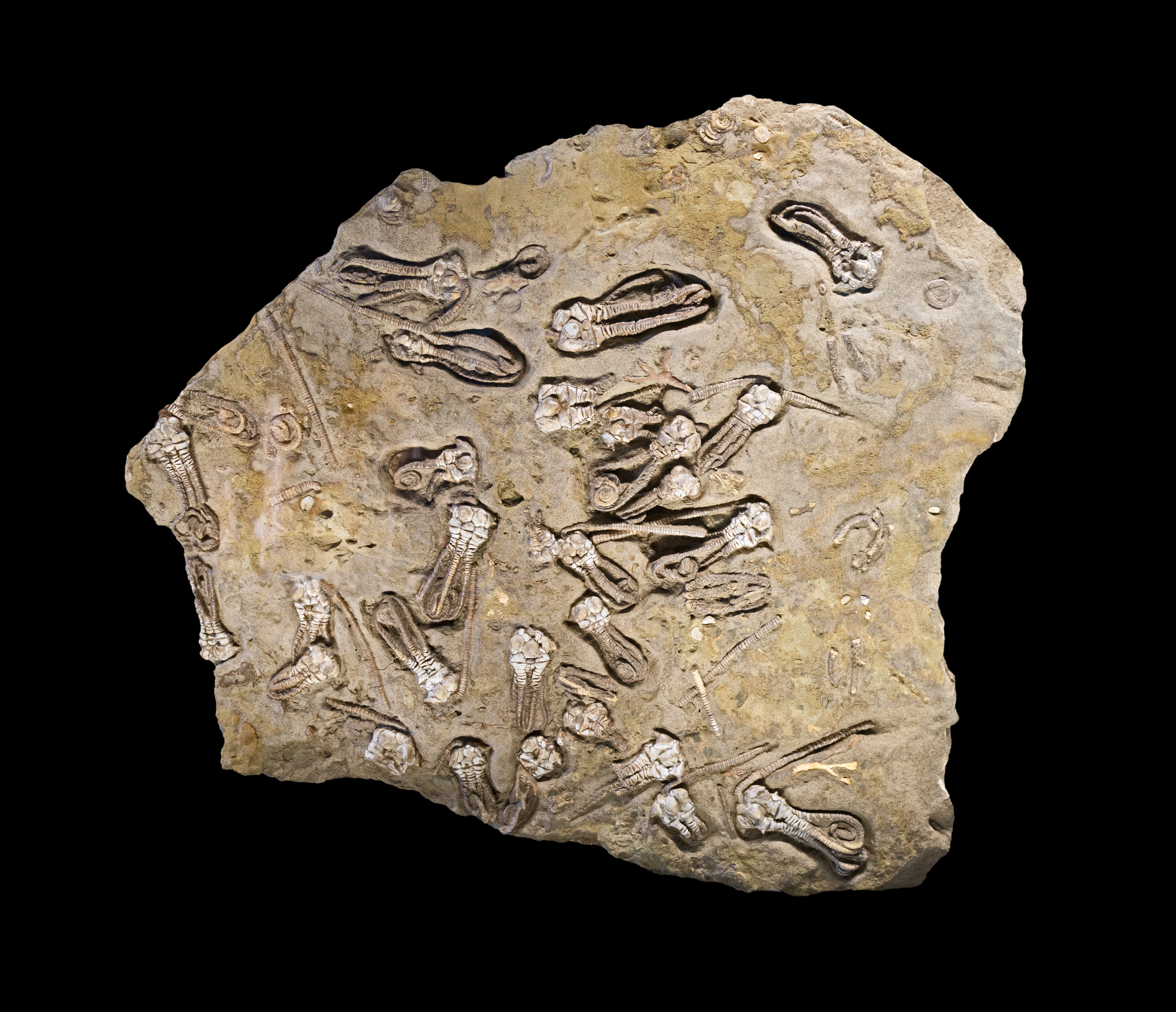
Jimbacrinus bostocki in sandstone of the Artinskian Cundlego Formation, found near Jimba Jimba

The station gave name to the Early Permian Jimba Jimba Formation, part of the Wooramel Group. In the limestones of the formation, many fossil bivalves, gastropods and brachiopods have been found. The crinoid Jimbacrinus bostocki, found in sandstones of the Cundlego Formation, was also named after the station.

== See also ==
- List of pastoral leases in Western Australia
- List of reduplicated Australian place names
