= Minilya River =

River in Western Australia

Minilya
- Etymology: Aboriginal: meaning unknown

Location
- Country: Australia
- State: Western Australia
- Region: Gascoyne

Physical characteristics
- Source: Black Range (Western Australia)
  - coordinates: 23°57′53″S 115°27′11″E
  - elevation: 275 m (902 ft)
- Mouth: Lake MacLeod
  - coordinates: 23°56′37″S 113°51′25″E
  - elevation: 0 m (0 ft)
- Length: 269 km (167 mi)
- Basin size: 52,662 km^{2} (20,333 sq mi)
- Discharge
  - location: Minilya Bridge
  - average: 45,652 ML/a (1.6122×10^{9} cu ft/a)

The Minilya River is a river in the Gascoyne region of Western Australia.

== Location and features ==
The headwaters of the river rise in the south-west of the Black Range and flows in a generally westerly direction, joined by three minor tributaries: Minilya River South, Bee Well Creek and Naughton Creek. The river is crossed by the North West Coastal Highway near the Minilya Roadhouse and then later discharges into Lake MacLeod. The area is semi-arid with a landscape of woodland and scrub used for sheep and cattle grazing. The Minilya River descends 278 metres (912 ft) over its 269-kilometre (167 mi) course.

The name of the river is Aboriginal in origin but its meaning is unknown. The first Europeans to visit the river were the explorers who named it, Charles Brockman and George Hamersley, who visited the area in 1876. Brockman and Hamersley also named the Lyndon River and Brockman later took up a 40,000 acres (16,187 ha) lease known as Boolathana then another property, Minilya Station.

The traditional owners of the area are the Tharrkari and Baiyungu peoples.

The soils throughout the river basin are eroded and the regional ecology is degraded as a result of cattle grazing from the numerous pastoral stations found through the area. As a result, fencing has been installed through the length of the river, water tanks and troughs installed and establishment of new grazing yards.

The Minilya is prone to occasional flooding following heavy rain events as it did in 1905. More flooding occurred 1918 when Minilya Station recorded 7.58 inches (193 mm) in just over two months isolating the homestead. Further flooding occurred in 1942 with many station homesteads being left isolated.

== See also ==
- List of watercourses in Western Australia
