= Lake Macleod =

Lake in Western Australia

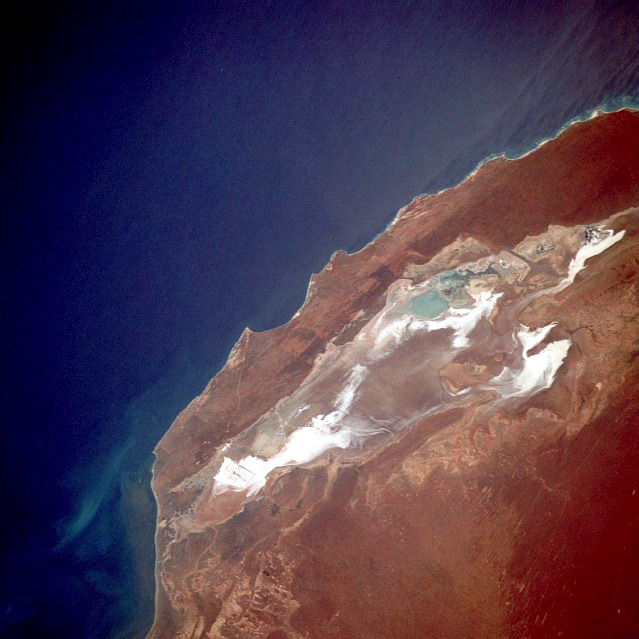
- Lake Macleod satellite image, 1989

- Location in northwest Western Australia
- Interactive map of Lake Macleod
- Location: Gascoyne, Western Australia
- Coordinates: 24°07′04″S 113°39′27″E
- Type: Salt lake
- Primary inflows: Lyndon River, Minilya River
- Primary outflows: none
- Basin countries: Australia
- Surface area: 2,000 km^{2} (770 sq mi)
- Average depth: 1.5 m (4.9 ft)
- Max. depth: 2.1 m (6.9 ft)

Lake Macleod is a marine salt lake in the Gascoyne region of Western Australia, 30 kilometres (19 mi) north of the port and regional centre of Carnarvon.

== History ==
Dirk Hartog, a Dutchman, made the first authenticated landing by a European along this coastline in 1616. Early explorers recorded phenomenal tidal ranges along this coast.

== Description ==
Most of Lake Macleod is normally dry, covering an area of 2,000 km^{2} (770 sq mi), 60 km^{2} (23 sq mi) of which is covered by perennial bodies of brine.

Climatically, this part of Western Australia is greatly influenced by the north-flowing Western Australian Current that brings cool water northward from Antarctica, which is not conducive to producing inland precipitation. This cool offshore current, coupled with a very flat coastal plain, contributes to the near-desert-like conditions along the coastal region as evidenced by the brown landscape around the lake and the highly reflective salt beds within the lake. The low point in the lake appears to be near the northern end where the light blues indicate some standing water. Close inspection of the image discloses very faint lines at the southernmost end of Lake Macleod where large evaporation beds are used for the production of high-quality salt and gypsum.

== Environment ==
The lake is recognised as a DIWA wetland as it is an outstanding example of a major lake situated on the coast that is periodically inundated by freshwater

=== Birds ===
Some 382 square kilometres (147 sq mi) of the permanent ponds in the north-western part of the lake have been identified by BirdLife International as an Important Bird Area (IBA) because they support fairy terns, over 1% of the world populations of red-necked stints, curlew sandpipers, banded stilts, red-necked avocets and red-capped plovers, as well as a population of dusky gerygones. The northern ponds consist of intermittently flooded, brackish to hypersaline mudflats surrounding saline springs and permanent saline channels and lagoons. Large numbers of red knots, Australian pelicans, little black cormorants, black-tailed godwits and black-winged stilts have been recorded. A substantial population of canary white-eyes is present. A review of the importance of the lake for shorebirds showed that it hosted significant populations of 10 species of which red knot, red-necked stint and curlew sandpiper occurred in internationally significant numbers.

== See also ==
- Leeuwin Current
- List of lakes of Australia § Western Australia
