= 2010 Gascoyne River flood =

2010 severe flood along the Gascoyne River in Western Australia

- 16 December satellite image of the tropical low that caused the flooding
- Date: 16–21 December 2010
- Location: Gascoyne River catchment in Western Australia
- Deaths: None reported
- Property damage: A$100 million (preliminary)

The 2010 Gascoyne River flood was regarded as the most severe flood to take place along the Gascoyne River in Western Australia on record. Triggered by record-breaking rainfall, amounting to over 6,000 percent of the monthly mean, 313.6 mm (12.35 in) and 5 mm (0.20 in) respectively, in just four days, the floods caused widespread damage in the region. By 17 December, the river began to rise in response to the heavy rains, eventually exceeding its banks within two days. Water levels reached record values at three stations along the river, cresting at 15.53 m (51.0 ft) near Fishy Pool. Evacuation orders were issued for several towns affected by rising waters. The most substantial impact was felt in Carnarvon where entire homes were washed away. Following the disaster, emergency supplies and funds were distributed to affected residents to aid them in restoring their livelihoods. Though no people died in the event, an estimated two thousand head of cattle perished and damage was estimated at A$100 million.

== Background ==
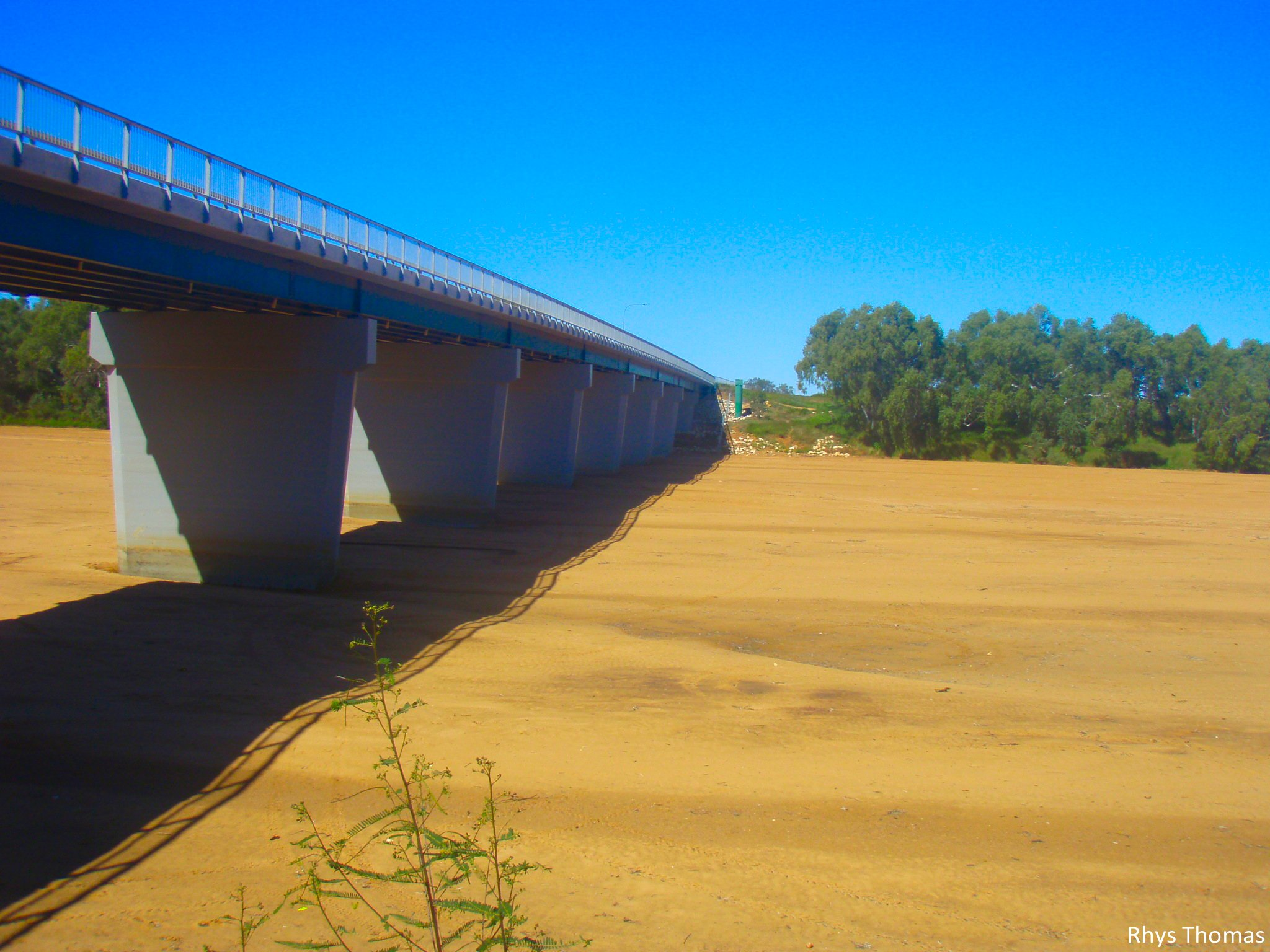
The normally dry Gascoyne Riverbed in February 2009

On 11 December 2010, a monsoon trough developed northwest of Western Australia. Slowly tracking to the south, the system spawned a low-pressure system (Tropical Low 03U) by 15 December. Turning southeastward, the low later made landfall near Coral Bay on 18 December. Within hours of moving inland, the system turned to the southwest and moved back over water the following morning. The storm was last noted on 20 December well off the coast of Western Australia.

Climatologically, the region affected by the floods is a dry area, with annual rainfall in most areas averaging between 200 and 300 mm (7.9 and 11.8 in). December is regarded as the third-driest month of the year, with a mean rainfall of just 5 mm (0.20 in). Prior to the event, much of the Gascoyne River catchment was suffering from a drought and many places abruptly shifted from drought conditions to record floods in less than 24 hours. Additionally, the river had no water flow before the floods, being a dry riverbed.

Between 16 and 20 December, the low produced heavy rains over much of the area around Shark Bay. These rains reached record amounts in numerous locations and greatly surpassed the monthly mean December rainfall; some areas reached levels of more than 6,000 percent above this value due to the storm. During a 24‑hour span on 17 December, a record-shattering 247.6 mm (9.75 in) of rain fell in Carnarvon. This value greatly exceeded both the previous record of 119.4 mm (4.70 in), set in 1923, and the city's annual average of 228.8 mm (9.01 in). Several other locations recorded similar rainfall in the region, also surpassing their annual rainfall totals in under two days. During the five-day span in which there was rainfall, a maximum of 313.6 mm (12.35 in) was measured in Carnarvon. A total of 23 stations and towns recorded record 24‑hour rainfall for the month of December in relation to the storm. According to the Bureau of Meteorology, Carnarvon Airport measured its wettest month on record, with 255 mm (10.0 in) of rain falling in just four days. The previous record was set in June 1895 at 219.7 mm (8.65 in).

== Impact ==
Event rainfall compared to climatological averages
Location	Rainfall	Average rainfall	
Location	Rainfall	December	Annual
Carnarvon	313.6 mm (12.35 in)	5.7 mm (0.22 in)	228.8 mm (9.01 in)
Marron	277.6 mm (10.93 in)	7 mm (0.28 in)	206.8 mm (8.14 in)
Doorawarrah	259.8 mm (10.23 in)	7.7 mm (0.30 in)	231.8 mm (9.13 in)
Mount Narryer	248 mm (9.8 in)	7.1 mm (0.28 in)	196 mm (7.7 in)
Carey Downs	244 mm (9.6 in)	9.7 mm (0.38 in)	206.2 mm (8.12 in)
Winderie	208 mm (8.2 in)	6.6 mm (0.26 in)	230.2 mm (9.06 in)

Prior to the arrival of the monsoon low, the Bureau of Meteorology issued a flood watch for the Gascoyne River catchment on 15 December, stating that 150 to 200 mm (5.9 to 7.9 in) of rain could fall over the following 72 hours. This was later upgraded to a flood warning as the situation worsened on 18 December. Once the rains ceased on 21 December, the warning was discontinued. During the torrential downpours, the Gascoyne River began to rise on 17 December, threatening to flood several towns along its banks. Water levels continuously rose through the morning of 19 December, at which time the floods attained their peak. In Fishy Pool, the river reached a record crest of 15.53 m (51.0 ft), surpassing the previous peak of 12.23 m (40.1 ft) in 1980. The floods subsided relatively quickly as the river dropped below flood stage on 21 December.

Once the river overflowed its banks, flood waters spread through vast agricultural and grazing areas, severely damaging crops and killing an estimated two thousand head of cattle. By 19 December, evacuations had taken place in rural parts of Carnarvon, with 200 residents residing in emergency shelters. The entire town was isolated from surrounding areas as flood waters cut off all roads; however, the main centre of the town remained untouched due to levees that were constructed in 1960. One person had to be rescued by a police helicopter after he was swept away by strong currents. Large portions of the North West Coastal Highway were shut down due to flooding for several days, hindering travel in the region. In Yalgoo, six residents required an airlift after becoming stranded in their home. A total of 30 people were rescued by helicopter on 20 December in Gascoyne Junction. Two days later, the entire town was evacuated and displaced residents sought refuge in Carnarvon. The most severe losses took place in the horticultural plantations which flank both sides of the river in Carnarvon, and in small communities and stations upriver. Several homesteads near Gascoyne Junction were washed away in the floods. and the center of the Gascoyne Junction township was referred to as an, "obliterated ghost town." Additionally, one person stated that he lost 50 percent of his banana crop. Throughout the affected area, preliminary assessments placed damage at A$100 million.

== Response ==
By 20 December, arrangements for the delivery of emergency food and water supplies were made and expected to reach Carnarvon later that day. Supplies were also sent to outlying Aboriginal communities affected by the floods. After evacuating on 20 December, residents were allowed to return to their homes two days later in Carnarvon. However, most were left without power and clean water and required assistance from local agencies. Following the disaster, there were concerns that the Australian government could have prevented at least some of the floods by following through with a flood mitigation program. Dudley Maslen, the President of The Shire of Carnarvon stated that he did not want to place blame on any agency, though hoped for improvement during the future. More than 100 local government areas and regions were declared natural disaster areas on 21 December, encompassing areas from central Western Australia to the Pilbara coastline.

By January 2011, much of the nation's attention had shifted from the Gascoyne flood to the devastating floods in Queensland. Many residents struggling to get their lives back together were frustrated with the government and demanded aid. Though people affected by the floods were to be given A$15,000 in funds, they expressed further anger after hearing that residents in Queensland would receive A$25,000. On 11 January, Prime Minister Julia Gillard stated that the imbalance in funds was to be corrected and residents of Western Australia would receive equal amounts to those in Queensland. By 20 January, donations for flood victims from the Lord Mayor's Distress Relief Fund exceeded A$1 million. Power restoration, especially in Gascoyne Junction, was unusually sluggish. Dozens of residents were without power for eight weeks, as electricity was finally restored between 12 and 13 February. This coincided with the arrival of replacement furniture from Paraburdoo; however, heavy rains renewed flooding and prevented most residents from picking up the supplies.

== See also ==
- 2010–11 Australian region cyclone season
- 2010–11 Queensland floods – catastrophic flooding in Queensland that began around the same time as the Gascoyne flood.
- Cyclone Olwyn
