= Charles Samuel Brockman =

Australian explorer and pastoralist

Charles Samuel Brockman (1845 – 28 November 1923) was a prominent explorer and pastoralist in the Gascoyne region of Western Australia.

Born in 1845 at Guildford, Western Australia, Charles' parents, Robert James Brockman and Elizabeth Elliot Walcott, were among the earliest pioneers in the Swan River Colony, later the Colony of Western Australia, arriving in 1830. He received some education through a private tutor, then went to manage his father's station in the Geraldton district at age fourteen, where he remained for the next five years. His younger brother was a fellow explorer and pastoralist, George Julius Brockman.

He started his own farm on the Greenough flats, which failed through the red rust that plagued most farmers in the area. He then entered the sandalwood industry in Dongara.

By 1872, Brockman had explored much of the country around Mount Magnet and tried to organise finance to establish a station in the area but without success. He then explored the Gascoyne in 1876, discovering Mount Clere and naming the Minilya River. In 1873 Brockman had established Minilya Station and stocked it with 7,000 sheep, in 1877 he established Boolathana Station with 3,000 sheep. Eventually his total landholding was approximately 1,600,000 acres (647,497 ha), and by 1882 he had a flock of about 20,000 sheep along with cattle and horses. Following troubles with the local Aboriginal people he eventually split the holding into three stations, two of which he sold.

In 1886, he bought a property on the Balingup River called Padbury's Brook. Renaming the property Brooklands, Brockman spent a lot on improvements and switched from cattle to sheep. Over time he reduced the size of the property and sold the last of the estate in 1911.

Brockman died 28 November 1923 at Sandridge Park in Bunbury after suffering from rheumatism, neuritis, and kidney trouble for some time. He left behind a widow, two sons and three daughters.
