= Minilya Station =

Pastoral lease in Western Australia

Coordinates: 23.85°S 113.971°E

Location in Western Australia

Minilya Station, most often referred to as Minilya, is a pastoral lease currently operating as a cattle station that once operated as a sheep station in the Gascoyne region of Western Australia.

The property is situated approximately 80 kilometres (50 mi) south of Coral Bay and 119 kilometres (74 mi) north of Carnarvon.

== History ==
Charles Brockman advertised to sell Minilya in 1882 when it had an area of 380,000 acres (153,781 ha). Stocked with 4,000 sheep, 40 cattle and horses the run was described as open grassy country with areas of saltbush and milkbush country. A large portion was well timbered and the run was well watered by clay pans, natural springs and North Brook. An estimated 70,000 acres (28,328 ha) of Minilya is situated along the coast and is bordered by Warroora Station. The entire property was estimated to have a carrying capacity of 70,000 sheep.

Minilya later was passed onto Brockman's brother, Julius, who put on the market in 1894. At this time Minilya encompassed an area of 200,000 acres (80,937 ha) and was stocked with 22,000 sheep and 50 horses. Minilya was divided into eight main paddocks which were mostly fenced and watered by tanks, wells and dams. A substantial five-bedroom homestead had been built along with outbuildings including a kitchen, stables, store, dairy and meat house. A new iron shearing shed along with a Farrer wool press, holding yards for 10,000 sheep and accommodation for 25 shearers were also included. It was later acquired by pastoralist and politician Donald Norman McLeod in 1899. By 1911 McLeod had a flock of 42,684 sheep running at Minilya and shearing produced 954 bales of wool.

McLeod died in 1914 and he property was left to his second son, Guy McLeod. Heavy rain during two months in 1918 (the property recorded 7.58 inches (193 mm)) caused the Minilya River to flood, isolating the homestead.

In 1925 over 58,724 sheep were shorn at Minilya. The property had grown in size and in 1925 occupied an area of 750,000 acres (303,514 ha). Lady Moulden from Adelaide bought a one third share of Minilya in 1933 for £22,000. The other partners were J. F. McLeod and D. G. McLeod, both of whom each had a third share. The property encompassed an area of 700,000 acres (283,280 ha) in 1933 and had 60 miles (97 km) of reticulation pipe laid down and was supporting a flock of 54,000 sheep. Following a period of drought about 10,000 sheep were sold off from the property and in 1937 a flock of 27,991 produced 768 bales of wool. A total of 830 bales of wool were produced in 1940 from the 33,511 sheep that were shorn.

The property supported a flock of about 33,000 sheep in 1954 and occupied an area of just under 700,000 acres (283,280 ha).

In 2010 Minilya was owned by WR Carpenter Agriculture Pty Ltd, Ric Stowe's cattle business, and occupied an area of 275,000 hectares (679,540 acres). A herd of Angus and Wagyu cattle all destined for the Asian market are run on the property. The property was acquired by Andrew Forrest in 2015 along with Brick House Station for an estimated A$10 million.

== See also ==
- List of pastoral leases in Western Australia
