= Gascoyne Junction, Western Australia =

Gascoyne Junction
- Town
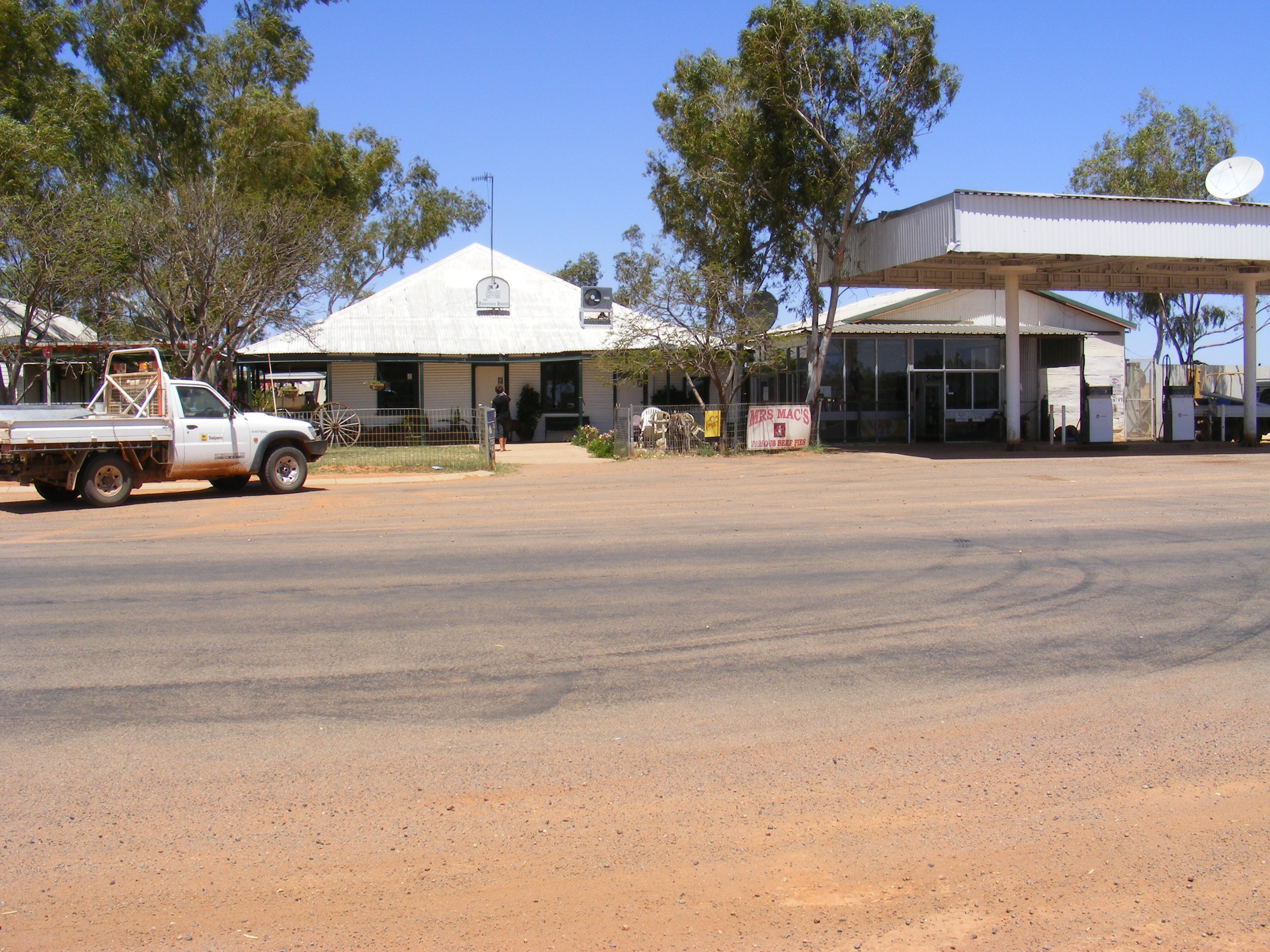
- The Gascoyne Junction Hotel in 2007, destroyed in the 2010 floods

- Interactive map of Gascoyne Junction
- Coordinates: 25.05°S 115.21°E
- Country: Australia
- State: Western Australia
- LGA: Shire of Upper Gascoyne
- Location: 965 km (600 mi) from Perth; 174 km (108 mi) from Carnarvon
- Established: 1897

Government
  - State electorate: North West
  - Federal division: Durack

Area
  - Total: 21.1 km^{2} (8.1 sq mi)
- Elevation: 144 m (472 ft)

Population
  - Total: 65 (SAL 2021)
- Postcode: 6705

Gascoyne Junction is a small town in the Gascoyne region of Western Australia, inland from Carnarvon on the junction of the Gascoyne River and Lyons River. At the 2006 census, Gascoyne Junction had a population of 149.

== History ==
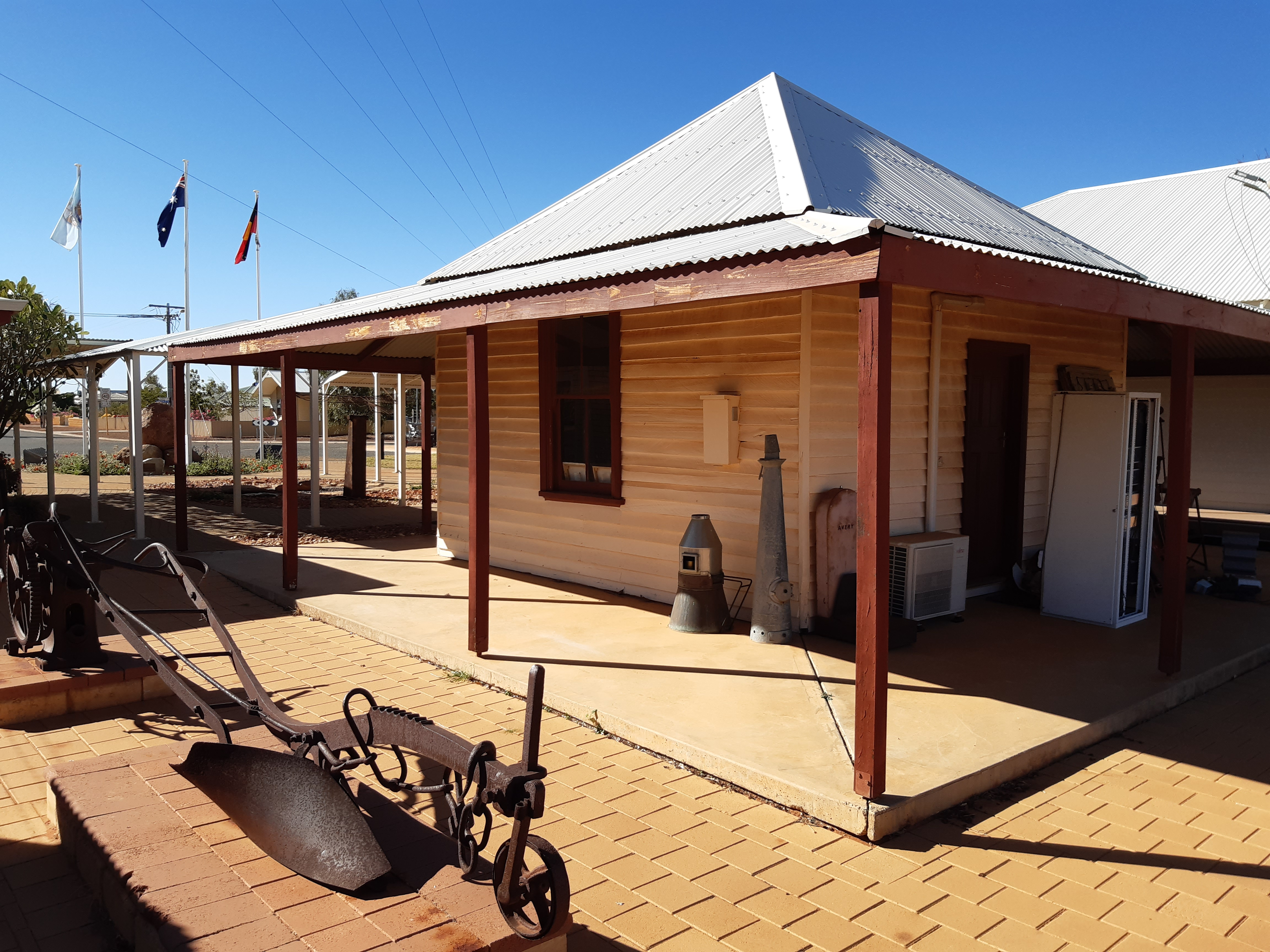
The Upper Gascoyne Road Board Office in 2020

The town is named for its position at the junction of the Gascoyne and Lyons Rivers. The Gascoyne River was named by the explorer Lieutenant George Grey in 1839 after his friend, Captain J. Gascoyne (RN).

A police station was built in about 1897, and settlers asked the Government to declare a townsite. By 1909, a general store and other buildings had been erected on private land, and in 1912, the Government finally acceded to the request, naming the town "Killili" after a local Aboriginal word meaning "bullrush" following the Surveyor General's request for a "euphonious native name". For many years, the police station, road board (1912) and hotel were the only buildings in the area, and in 1938, the Roads Board complained about the name, saying that "Gascoyne Junction" and "The Junction" were the names in common use, and asking the Lands Department to "expunge" the name of Killili. The name was changed and gazetted in 1939. The local road board office, now a heritage-listed site, was used as a meeting place for local associations, and later as the first school in the area (1960–1965) and, since the late 1990s, as a museum. The town's population has been stable since the 1950s.

== Present day ==
Gascoyne Junction is now a centre for mining, pastoral and desert merino fine wool industries, and serves as a gateway to nearby attractions such as Mount Augustus National Park and Kennedy Range National Park. The town contains the Shire of Upper Gascoyne Council Office, the Junction Pub and Tourist Park, Gascoyne Junction Community Resource Centre & Visitor Information Centre. The Community Resource Centre is an agency for Australia Post, the Western Australia Department of Transport, Services Australia and local library. The Junction Pub & Tourist Park provides a variety of accommodation, a pub and roadhouse with both diesel and unleaded fuel. Picnic and playground facilities with BBQ are available in Federation Park surrounding the Town Pavilion. In late 2021 a Visitor Stop will be finished welcoming visitors to the town, creating an outdoor museum and amphitheatre.

It was reported to be the least religious place in Australia, with 66.5 per cent of the population stating that they had no religion in the 2016 Census.

=== Transport and utilities ===
Power is supplied by Horizon Power, who run a diesel power station in the town. The town supplies its own water from bores, which is treated by the Water Corporation. The Carnarvon–Mullewa Road, which passes through the town, is sealed between Carnarvon and Gascoyne Junction; a ceremony to mark the reconstruction of the last section was held on 20 May 2011. Australia Post services the region with private contractors, who also deliver petroleum and cargo.

=== Education ===
A new Remote Community School was opened in 2005 for kindergarten through year 12, with high school and some TAFE classes being provided through the School of Isolated and Distance Education. It replaces an earlier school going back to 1960, and its students have historically used the Carnarvon School of the Air program. Many of the students are of Indigenous origin. The nearest TAFE facility is in Carnarvon, and the nearest university courses are offered at Carnarvon High School through Open Universities Australia, and through Pilbara TAFE in Karratha and Port Hedland, which offer some Curtin University courses through the Centre for Regional Education.

=== 2010 floods ===
Evacuation was required due to the Gascoyne River floods of late December 2010. This significant flood event saw the destruction of the town's original pub The Junction Hotel. It was originally constructed in 1906 as the general store.

== Climate ==
Gascoyne Junction has a hot desert climate (Köppen climate classification: BWh), with very hot summers and mild winters. It holds the Australian record for the hottest Christmas day of 48.3 °C (118.9 °F), set in 1997.

Climate data for Gascoyne Junction
Month	Jan	Feb	Mar	Apr	May	Jun	Jul	Aug	Sep	Oct	Nov	Dec	Year
Record high °C (°F)	48.6 (119.5)	49.2 (120.6)	46.9 (116.4)	44.2 (111.6)	38.5 (101.3)	32.5 (90.5)	32.1 (89.8)	36.2 (97.2)	39.6 (103.3)	44.0 (111.2)	45.0 (113.0)	48.3 (118.9)	49.2 (120.6)
Mean daily maximum °C (°F)	40.7 (105.3)	39.7 (103.5)	37.4 (99.3)	32.8 (91.0)	27.7 (81.9)	23.8 (74.8)	23.0 (73.4)	24.9 (76.8)	28.3 (82.9)	32.2 (90.0)	35.2 (95.4)	38.7 (101.7)	32.0 (89.7)
Mean daily minimum °C (°F)	23.8 (74.8)	24.4 (75.9)	22.5 (72.5)	18.6 (65.5)	13.8 (56.8)	10.5 (50.9)	9.3 (48.7)	10.0 (50.0)	12.0 (53.6)	15.3 (59.5)	18.1 (64.6)	21.3 (70.3)	16.6 (61.9)
Record low °C (°F)	15.5 (59.9)	15.6 (60.1)	13.0 (55.4)	8.3 (46.9)	3.9 (39.0)	2.4 (36.3)	1.4 (34.5)	1.3 (34.3)	4.4 (39.9)	6.1 (43.0)	8.9 (48.0)	14.0 (57.2)	1.3 (34.3)
Average rainfall mm (inches)	23.0 (0.91)	30.9 (1.22)	29.5 (1.16)	13.9 (0.55)	27.6 (1.09)	31.1 (1.22)	26.4 (1.04)	11.7 (0.46)	2.9 (0.11)	4.5 (0.18)	3.4 (0.13)	4.4 (0.17)	209.3 (8.24)
Average rainy days	2.9	3.6	2.7	2.2	3.7	4.7	4.3	2.7	1.1	1.0	0.9	0.9	30.7
Average relative humidity (%) (at 3pm)	20	24	24	29	34	42	40	33	25	21	20	18	28
Source: Bureau of Meteorology
