= List of Indigenous peoples =

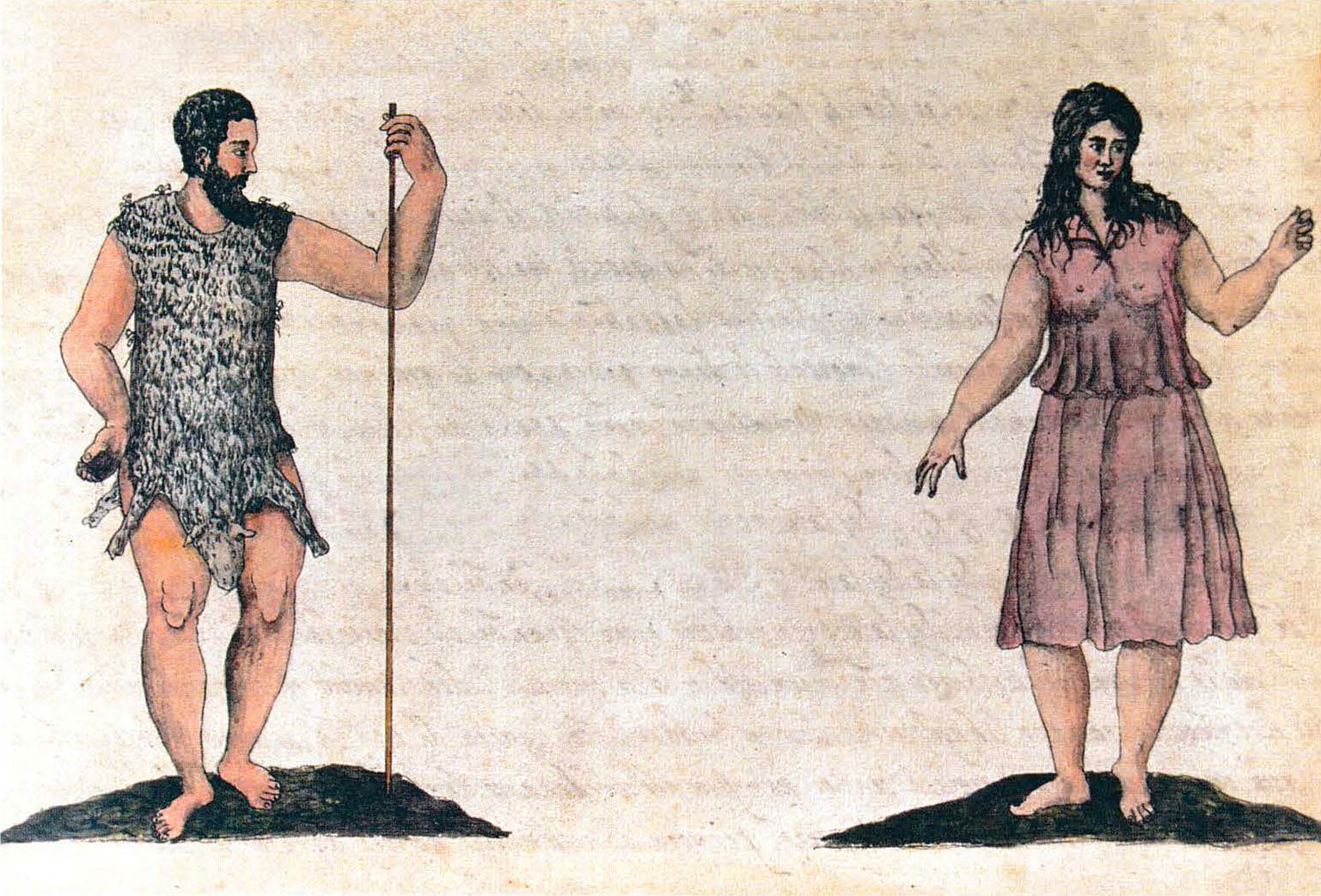
Painting of Bimbache of El Hierro by Leonardo Torriani, 1592

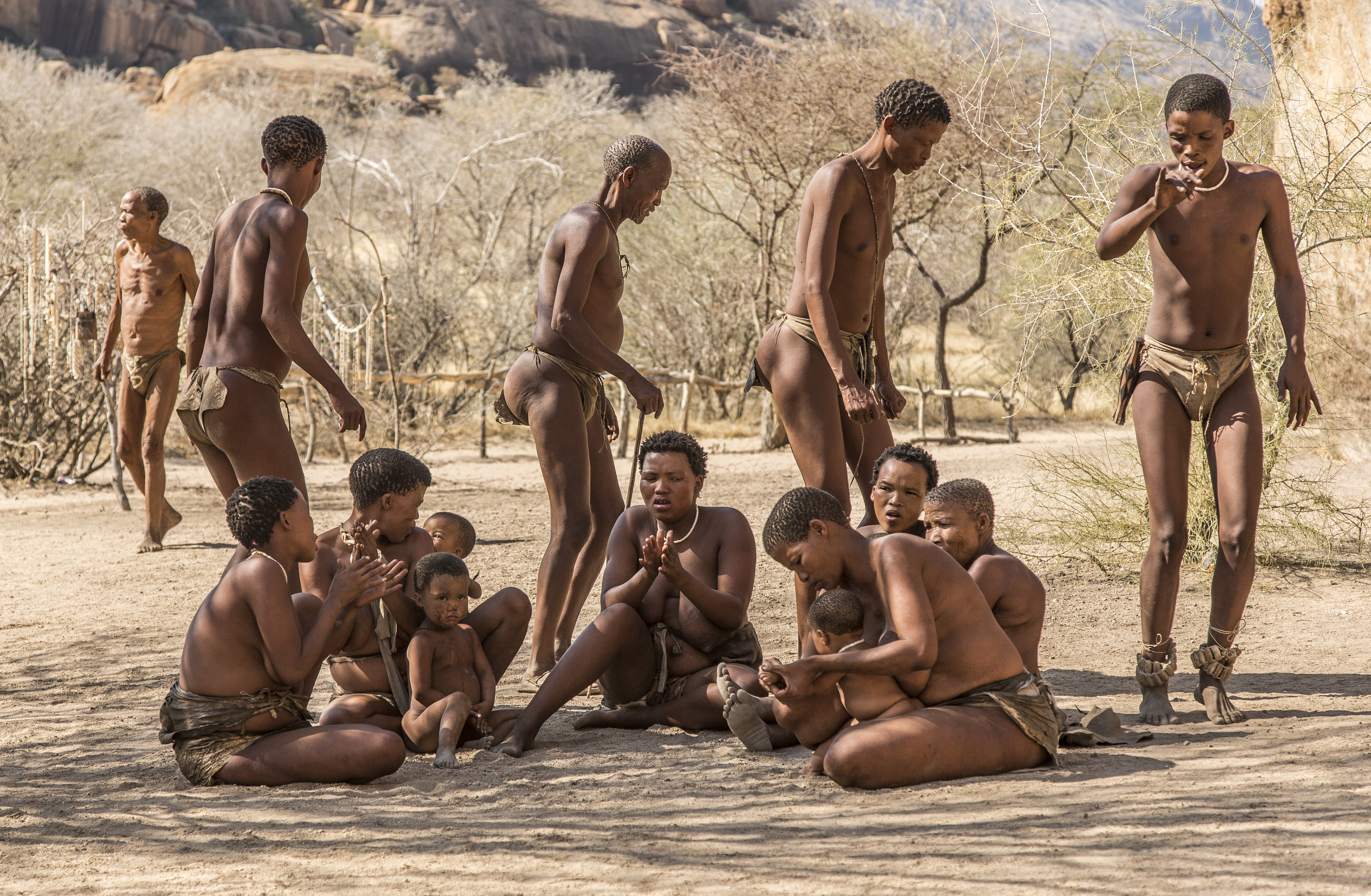
The San are the oldest inhabitants of Southern Africa

Indigenous peoples, communities, and nations are those which have a historical continuity with pre-invasion and pre-colonial societies that developed on their territories, and may consider themselves distinct from other sectors of the societies now prevailing on those territories, or parts of them. They form at present non-dominant sectors of society and are determined to preserve, develop and transmit to future generations their ancestral territories, and their ethnic identity, as the basis of their continued existence as peoples, in accordance with their own cultural patterns, social institutions and legal system.

This historical continuity may consist of the continuation, for an extended period reaching into the present of one or more of the following factors:

- Occupation of ancestral lands, or at least of part of them
- Common ancestry with the original occupants of these lands
- Culture in general, or in specific manifestations (such as religion, living under a tribal system, membership in an Indigenous community, dress, means of livelihood, lifestyle, etc.)
- Language (whether used as the only language, as mother-tongue, as the habitual means of communication at home or in the family, or as the main, preferred, habitual, general or normal language)
- Residence in certain parts of the country, or in certain regions of the world
- Other relevant factors.
- On an individual basis, an Indigenous person is one who belongs to these Indigenous populations through self-identification as Indigenous (group consciousness) and is recognized and accepted by these populations as one of its members (acceptance by the group). This preserves for these communities the sovereign right and power to decide who belongs to them, without external interference.

== Africa ==
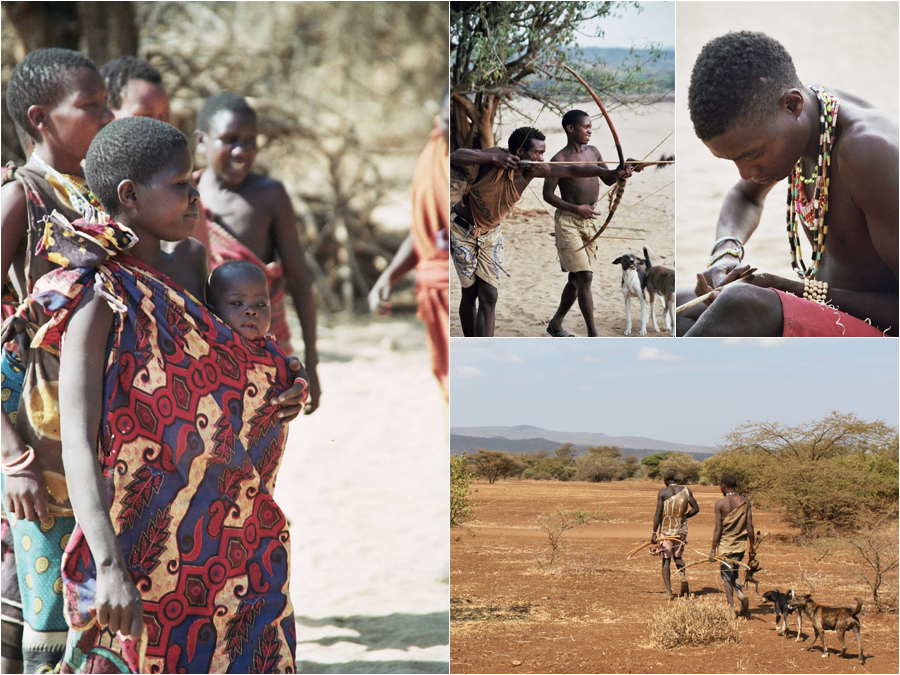
Hadza people, who are indigenous to the African Great Lakes

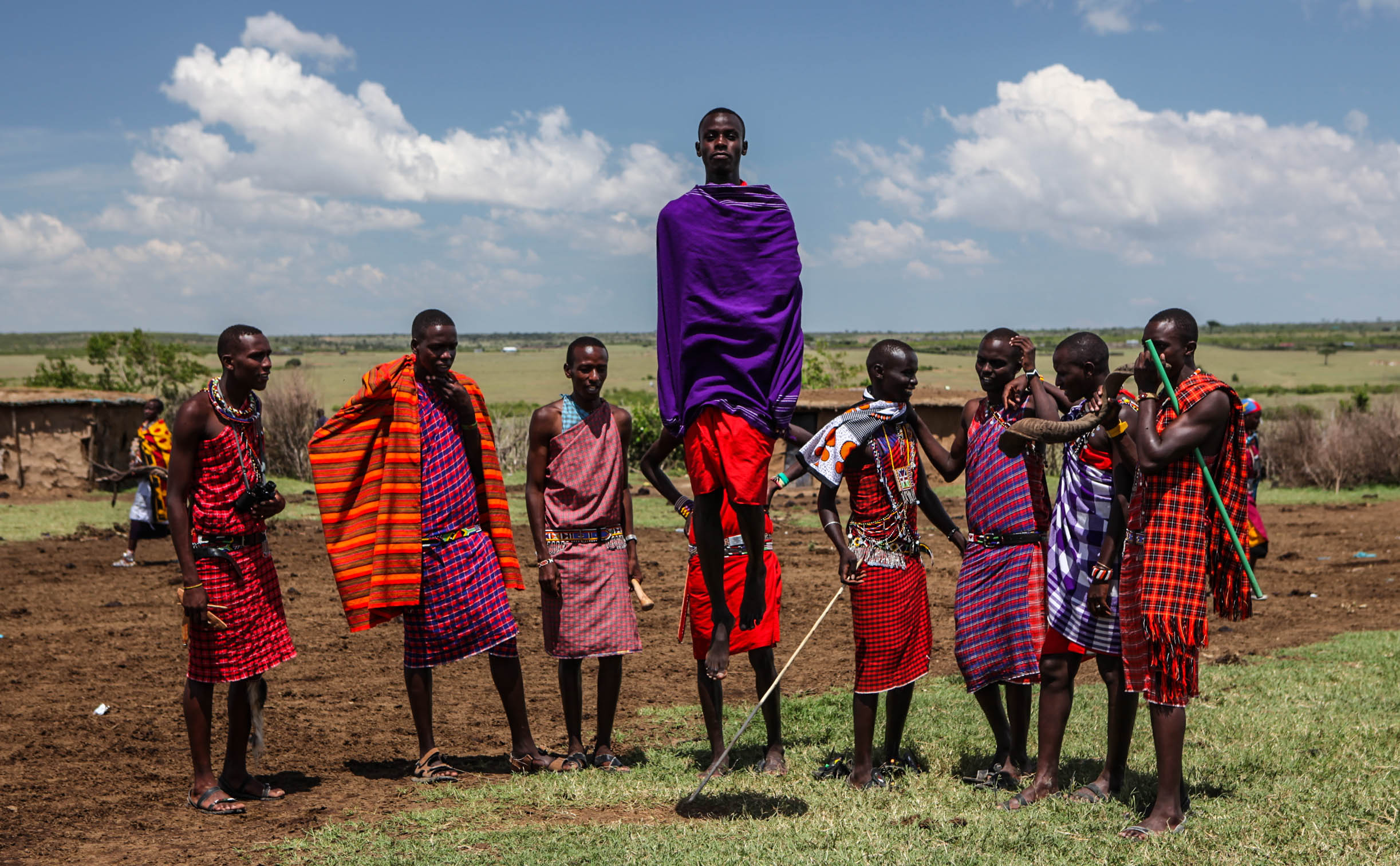
A Maasai traditional dance

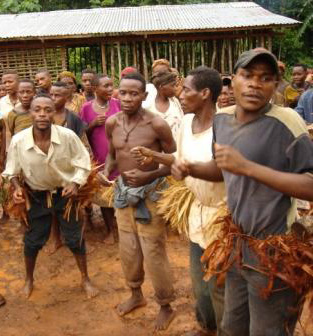
Baka pygmy dancers in the East Province of Cameroon

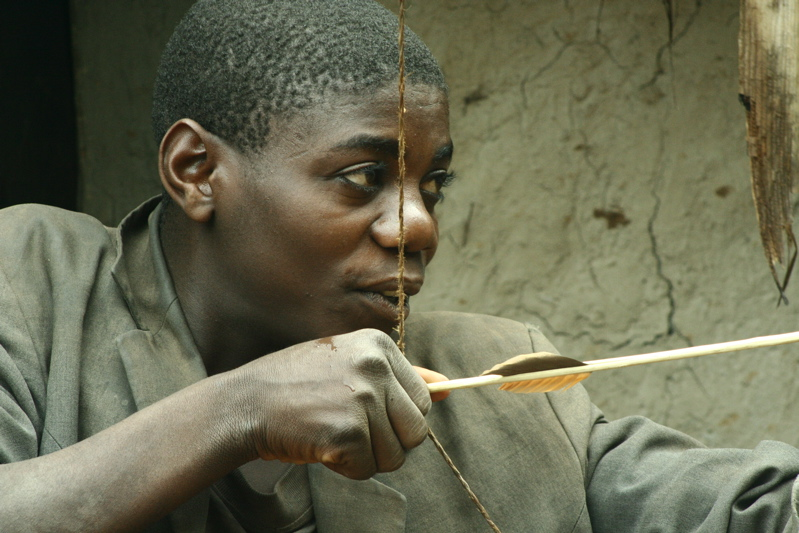
Batwa Pygmy with traditional bow and arrow

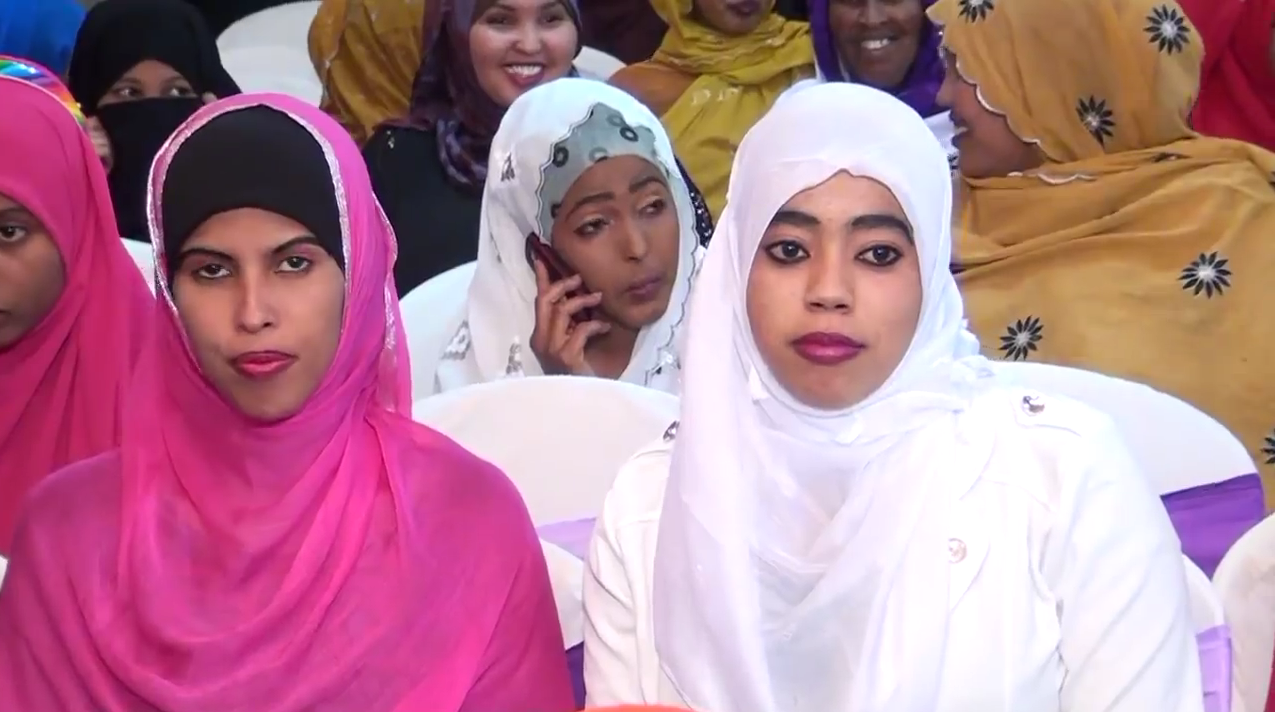
Somali women in hijab

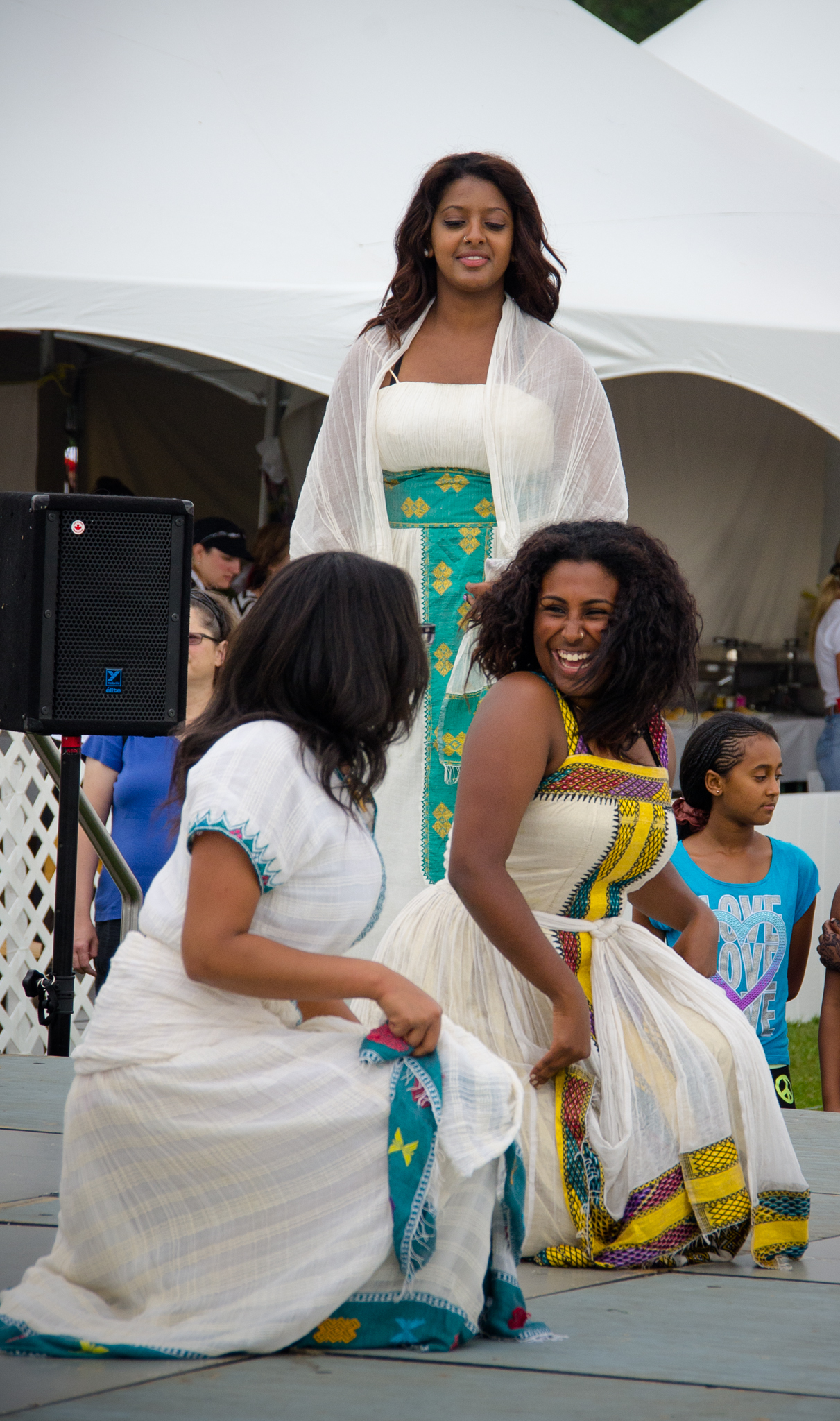
Tigrayan women in traditional attire

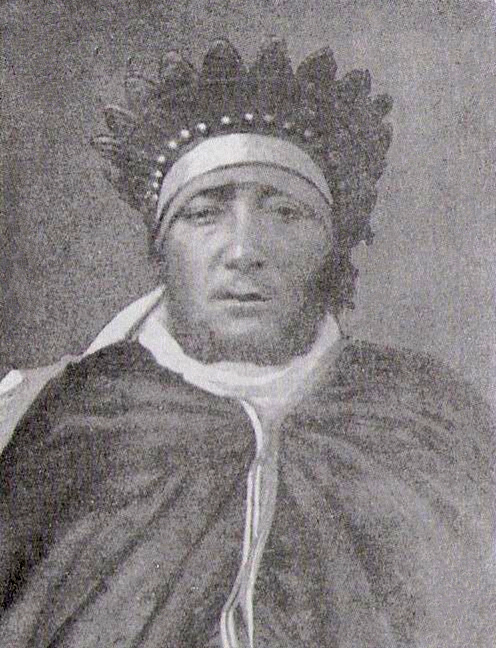
Wolayta chief

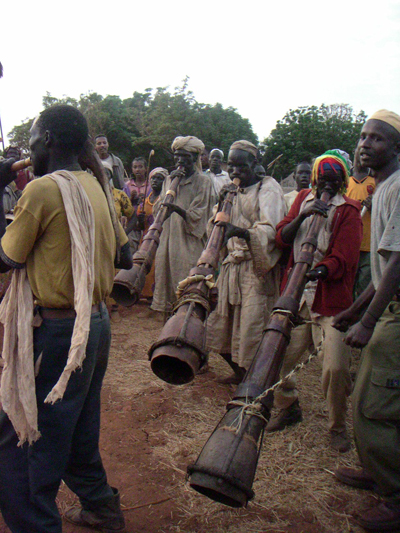
Berta people playing trumpets during a wedding ceremony

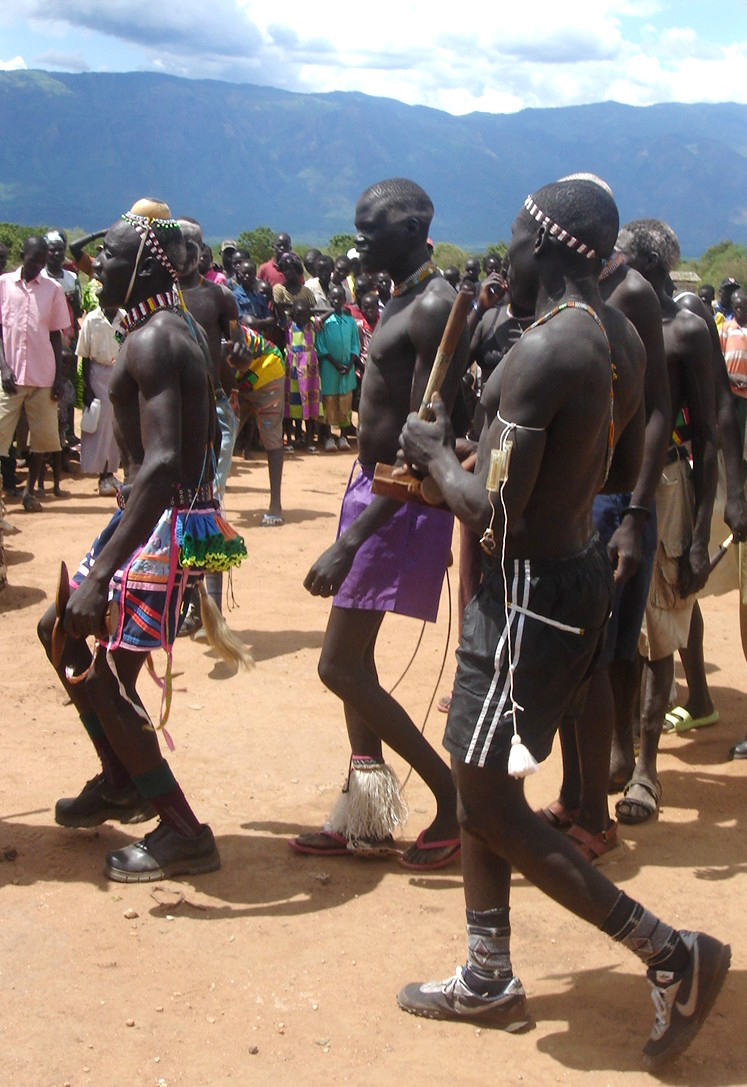
Nilotic men in Kapoeta, South Sudan

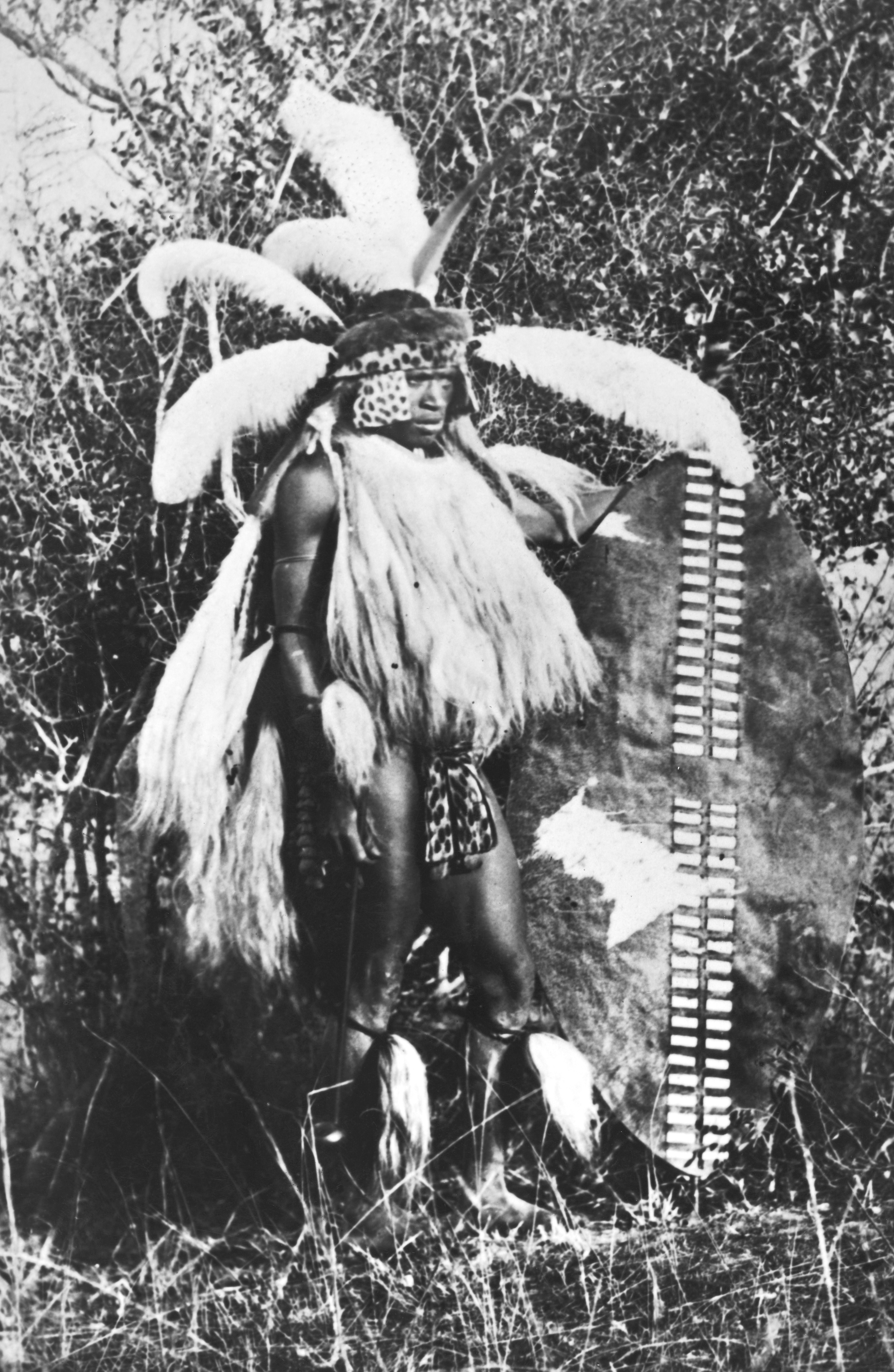
19th century Zulu man wearing a warrior's garb

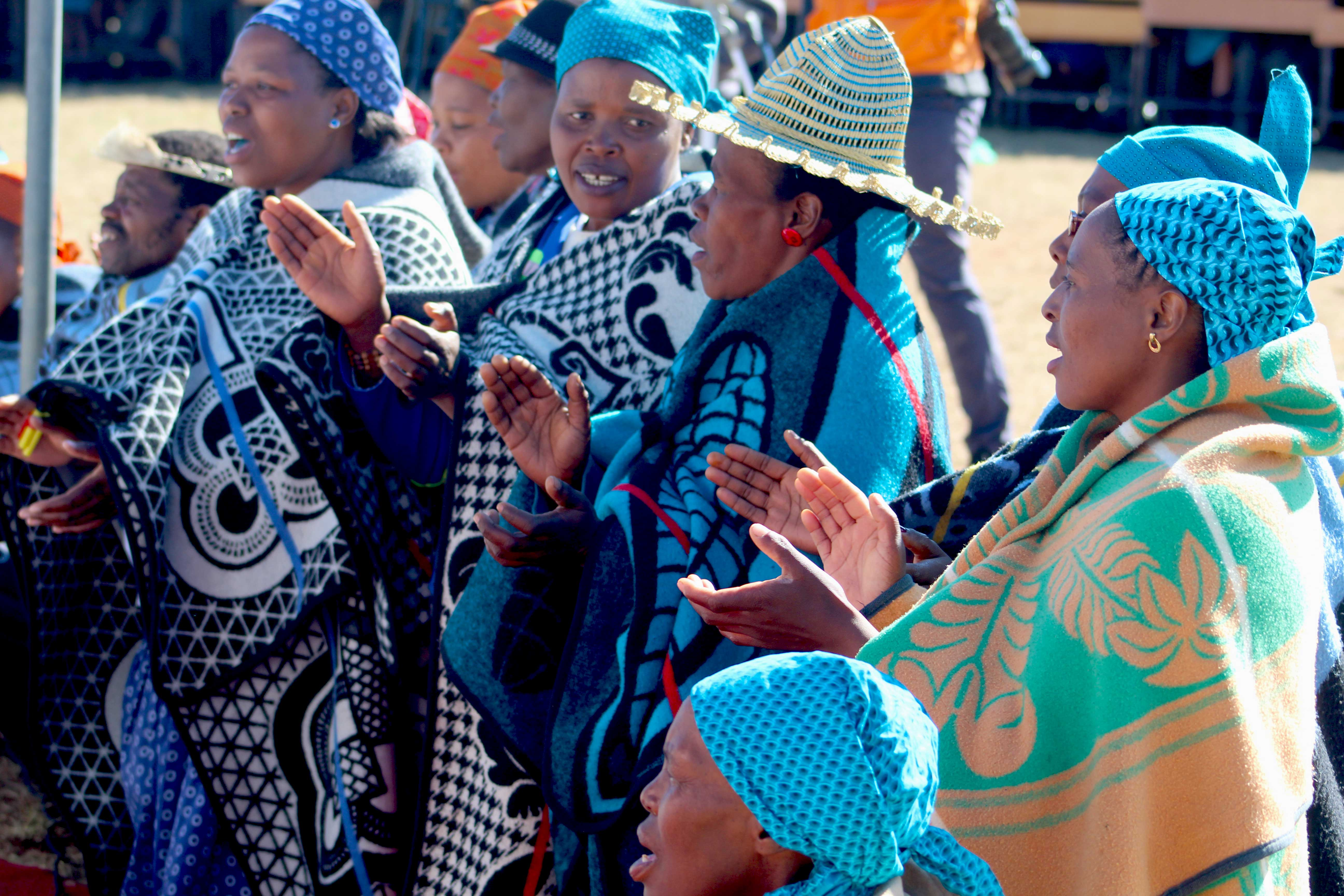
Sotho women wearing the traditional Seana Marena blanket

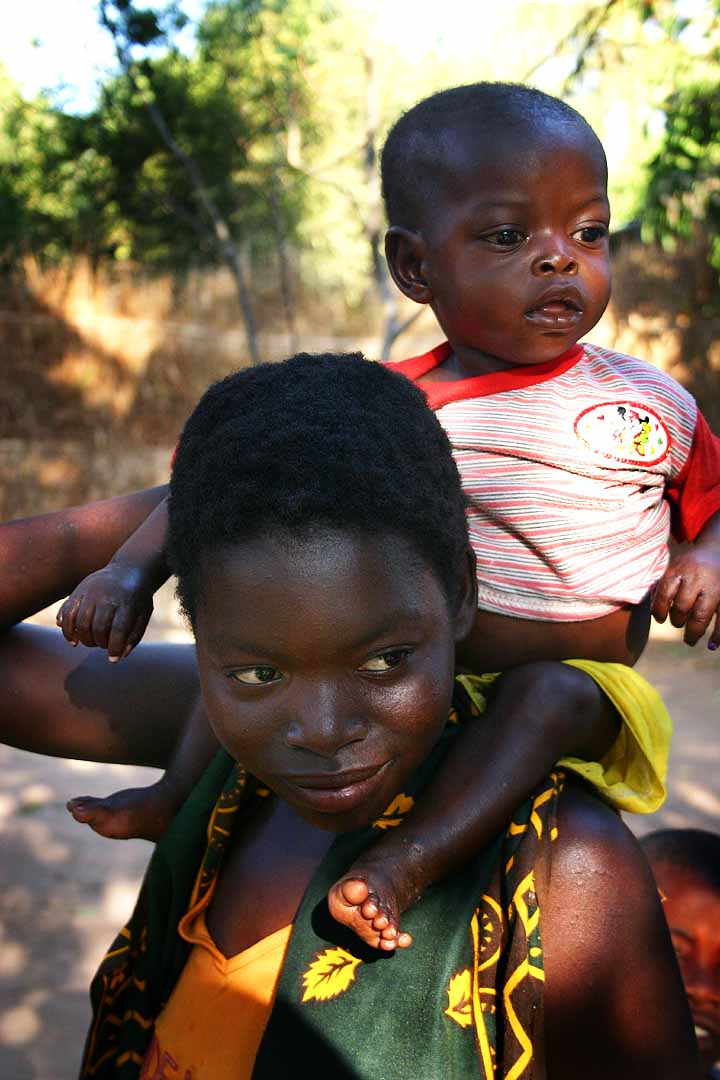
Makua mother and child

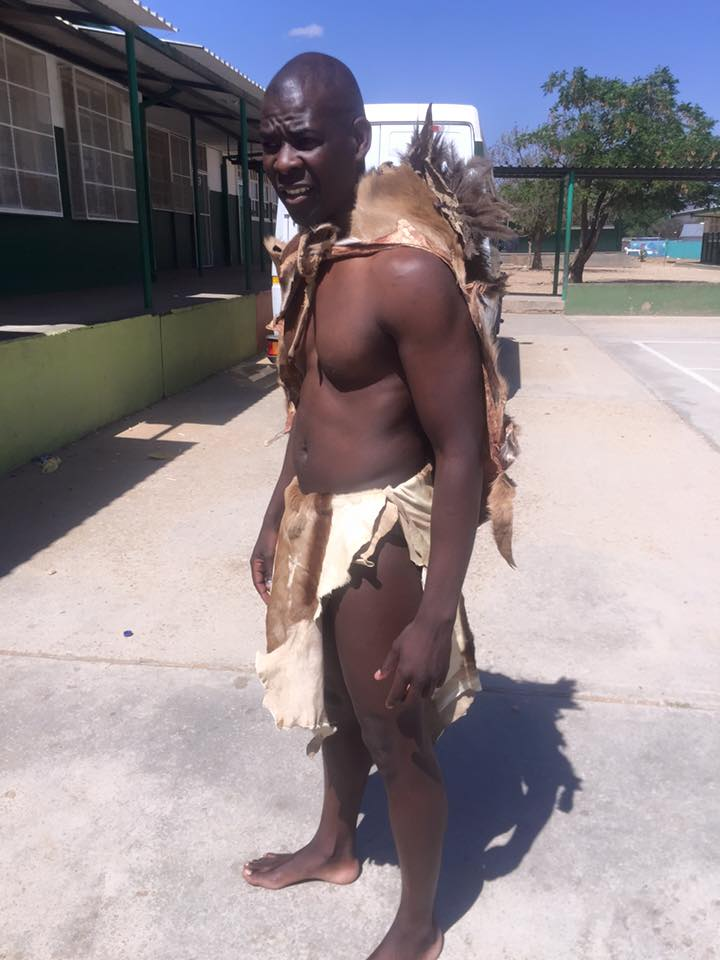
Damara man wearing the ǃgūb, a traditional attire

=== African Great Lakes ===
- Abagusii: Kenya
- Hadza (Hadzabe): Tanzania, Singida region: southeast, south and northwest of Lake Eyashi.
- Iraqw: Tanzania
- Kalenjin: Kenya
- Kikuyu: Kenya
- Luhya: Kenya
- Maasai: Kenya, Tanzania
- Rendille: Kenya
- Samburu: Kenya, Tanzania
- Sandawe: Tanzania, Dodoma region: Kondoa district, between Bubu and Mponde rivers, Singida region.
- Pygmy peoples:
  - Twa
    - Bangweulu Twa: Northern Zambia, Bangweulu Swamps,
    - Great Lakes Twa: Rwanda, Burundi, Uganda, Democratic Republic of Congo
    - Kafwe Twa: Southern Zambia, Kafue Flats
    - Lukanga Twa: Central Zambia, Lukanga Swamp
    - Nsua: Western Uganda

=== Central Africa ===
- Pygmy peoples:
  - Bedzan: Northern Central Cameroon
  - Mbenga:
    - Aka (Bayaka)
    - Baka (Bebayaka): Cameroon, Congo (Brazzaville), Gabon, and Central African Republic
    - Bongo (Babongo):
    - Gyele (Bagyele):
    - Kola (Bakola):
  - Mbuti (Bambuti):
    - Asua: Democratic Republic of the Congo
    - Efé: Democratic Republic of the Congo
    - Kango/Sua:
    - Mbuti:
    - Wochua:
  - Twa
    - Angola Twa: Northeastern, Eastern and Southern Angola
    - Kasai Twa (Kuba Twa): Central Democratic Republic of Congo
    - Mbote Twa: Southeastern Democratic Republic of Congo, Northwest of Lake Tanganyika
    - Mongo Twa (Ntomba Twa): Western Democratic Republic of Congo, Lake Tumba, Lake Mai-Ndombe
    - Upemba Twa (Luba Twa): Southeastern Democratic Republic of Congo, Upemba Depression
  - Laal peoples

=== Horn of Africa ===
- Afar people (Qafár/'Afár): the Afar Triangle of Djibouti, Eritrea, Ethiopia
- Amhara: Ethiopia
- Banna: Southwestern Ethiopia, Southern Nations, Nationalities, and Peoples Region (SNNPR)
- Basketo: Southwestern Ethiopia, Southern Nations, Nationalities, and Peoples Region (SNNPR)
- Berta (Funj): Western Ethiopia, Benishangul-Gumuz Region, Far Eastern Sudan
- Burji: Southern Ethiopia, Southern Nations, Nationalities, and Peoples Region (SNNPR)
- Gedeo: Southern Ethiopia, Southern Nations, Nationalities, and Peoples Region (SNNPR)
- Gumuz: Western Ethiopia, Benishangul-Gumuz Region, Far Eastern Sudan
- Hamer: Southwestern Ethiopia, Southern Nations, Nationalities, and Peoples Region (SNNPR)
- Karo: Southwestern Ethiopia, Southern Nations, Nationalities, and Peoples Region (SNNPR)
- Kunama: Western Eritrea, Gash-Barka Region, Far Eastern Sudan
- Maale: Southwestern Ethiopia, Southern Nations, Nationalities, and Peoples Region (SNNPR)
- Mursi (Mun): mainly in Debub Omo Zone, Southern Nations, Nationalities and Peoples Region, Southwest Ethiopia
- Nara: Western Eritrea, Gash-Barka Region, Far Eastern Sudan
- Oromo people: Ethiopia, Kenya
- Saho: Central Eritrea, Southern part of Northern Red Sea Region
- Shinasha (Shinasha): Northwestern Ethiopia
- Sidama: Southern Ethiopia, Southern Nations, Nationalities, and Peoples Region (SNNPR)
- Somalis: Somalia, Djibouti, eastern Ethiopia, northeastern Kenya
- Suri Baale: Ethiopia
- Suri Chai: Ethiopia
- Suri Timaga: Ethiopia
- Wolayta: Southwestern Ethiopia, Southern Nations, Nationalities, and Peoples Region (SNNPR)
- Yem: Southwestern Ethiopia, Southern Nations, Nationalities, and Peoples Region (SNNPR)

=== Sudan ===
- Nuba peoples: Sudan, Nuba Hills
- Nubians: Far Northern North Sudan and Far Southern Egypt, along middle Nile river valley banks
- Dinka (Jieng): mainly in Lakes, Warrap and Unity States, Upper Nile river course, Central and North South Sudan.
- Nuer (Naadh): mainly in Jonglei State, East of Upper Nile river course, East Central South Sudan.
- Anuak (Anywaa): mainly East Jonglei State, East South Sudan, and also mainly in Gambela Region, Lowlands of Far Southwest Ethiopia (border areas between South Sudan and Ethiopia).
- Shilluk (Chollo/Cøllø): mainly in North South Sudan, west of the Upper Nile river course, Upper Nile State, South Sudan (Kodok or Kothok, formerly known as Fashoda is in their territory).
- Fur (Fòòrà): Darfur, Western Sudan
- Masalit: Darfur, Western Sudan
- Kadu peoples: Sudan, Nuba Hills

=== Southern Africa ===
- Bantu languages-speaking peoples of Southern Africa: South Africa, Lesotho, Eswatini, Botswana, Mozambique, Zimbabwe, Namibia, southern Angola.
  - Nguni people
    - Xhosa
    - Zulu
    - Ndebele
      - Northern Ndebele people (Zimbabwe)
      - Southern Ndebele people (South Africa)
        - South Ndebele
        - Sumayela Ndebele
    - Swati
    - Phuthi
    - Lala
    - Bhaca
    - Hlubi
    - Nhlangwini
  - Sotho–Tswana people
    - Tswana
    - Bobirwa
    - Tswapong
    - Kgalagadi
    - Sotho
    - Northern Sotho
    - East Sotho (Pulana, Khutswe and Pai)
    - Lozi
  - Makua people
    - Makhuwa
    - Koti
    - Sakati (Nathembo)
    - Lomwe
    - Chuwabu
    - Moniga
  - Tswa–Ronga languages people
    - Tsonga
    - Ronga
    - Tswa
  - Venda people
  - Shona/Shonic people - speaking peoples: Zimbabwe, Mozambique, Botswana m
    - Zezuru
    - Korekore
    - Manyika
    - Barwe
    - Karanga
    - Kalanga people
    - Ndau
  - Chopi people
    - Chopi
    - Guitonga
  - Chewa people
  - Yeyi people
  - Kavango languages-speaking peoples
    - Ovambo people
    - Herero people
    - Himba people
    - Kavango people
- Southern Khoekhoe languages-speaking peoples: Angola, Namibia, Botswana, Kalahari Desert, Zimbabwe, west and southwestern South Africa.
  - Khoekhoe
  - Nama (Namaqua)
  - Damara
  - Haiǁom
  - Gǀu and Gǁana
  - Naro
  - Tsoa/Tshwa/Kua
- Southern San languages-speaking peoples: Angola, Namibia, Botswana, Kalahari Desert, west and southwestern South Africa.
  - Kxʼa/Ju–ǂHoan
    - ǃKung/Juu
      - ǂʼAmkoe
      - ǂKxʼao-ǁʼae (Auen)
  - Tuu
  - ǃKwi (!Ui)
    - ǀXam
    - ǂKhomani (Nǀu)
    - Khwe (Khoi, Kxoe)
  - Taa
    - ǃXooŋake/Nǀumde

=== West Africa ===
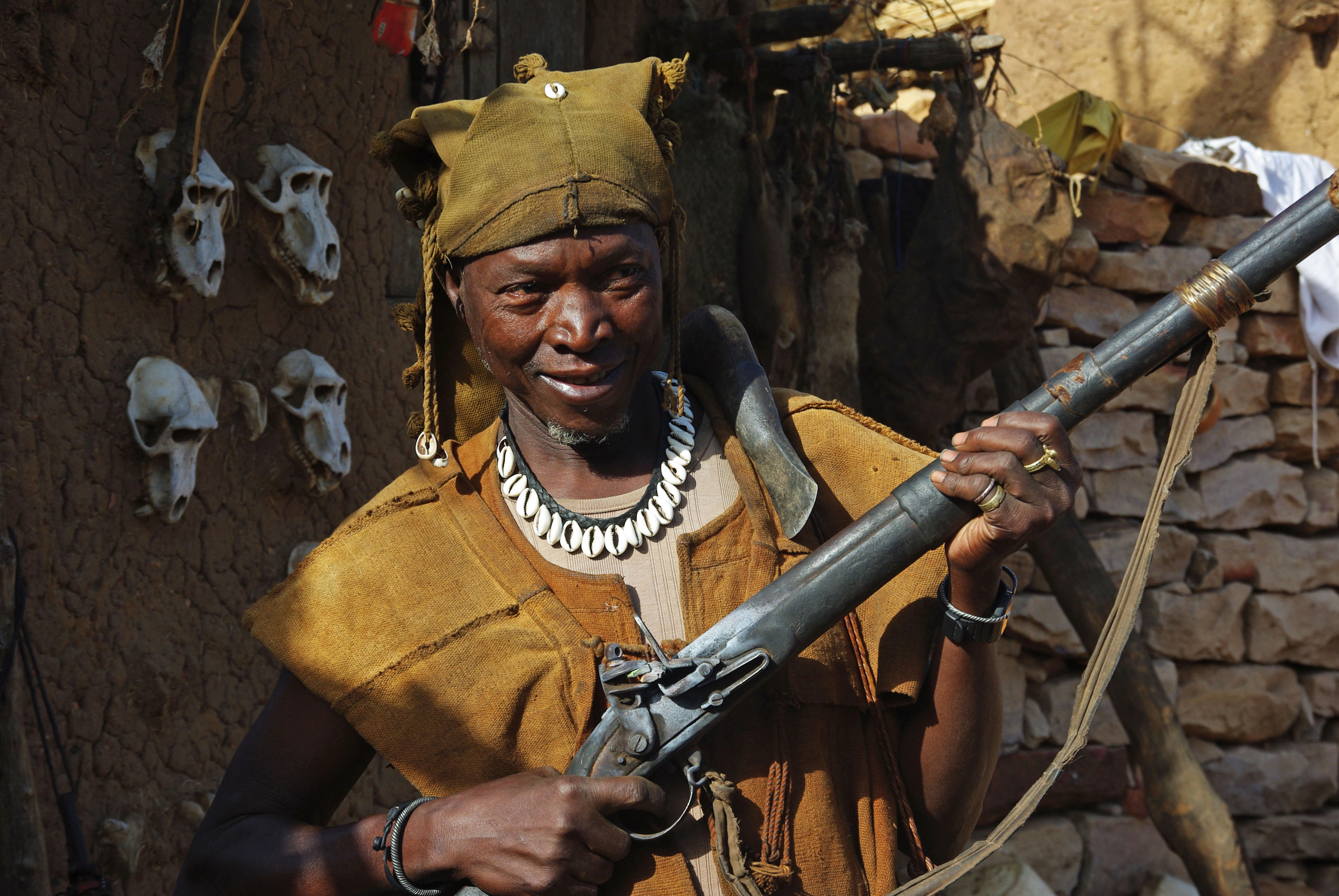
A Dogon hunter with a flintlock musket, 2010

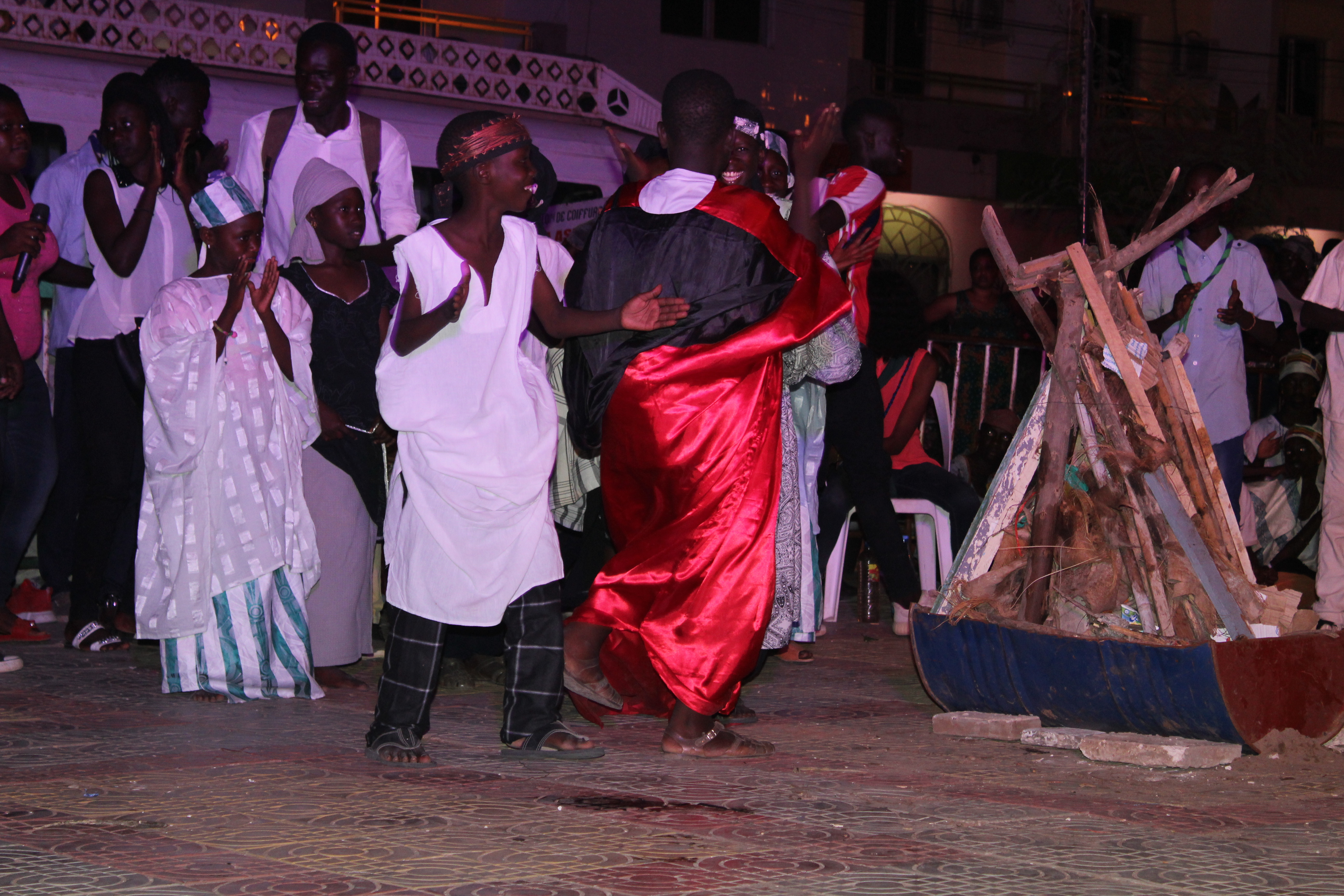
Serer cultural vigil in Senegal

- Dogon people: Mali, and small population in Burkina Faso.
- Jola people: Guinea-Bissau, The Gambia, and Senegal
- Serer people: Senegal, The Gambia, Guinea-Bissau, Mauritania, and formally North Africa.
- Mandinka people: Guinea, Mali, Senegal, The Gambia, Guinea Bissau, Ghana, Liberia, and Sierra Leone.
- Soninke people: Mali, Senegal, and The Gambia.
- Wolof people: Senegal, The Gambia, and Mauritania.
- Mossi people: Burkina Faso, Côte d'Ivoire, and Ghana.
- Hausa people: Nigeria, Niger, Cameroon, Côte d'Ivoire, Ghana, Benin, and Togo.
- Ogoni people
- Yoruba people: Nigeria, Benin, Ghana, Togo, Côte d'Ivoire, Niger, Sierra Leone, and The Gambia.
- Fula people: Nigeria, Senegal, Sierra Leone, Guinea, Mali, Burkina Faso, Niger, Benin, Mauritania, Guinea Bissau, The Gambia, Togo, Ghana, and Côte d'Ivoire.
- Igbo people: Nigeria

=== North Africa ===
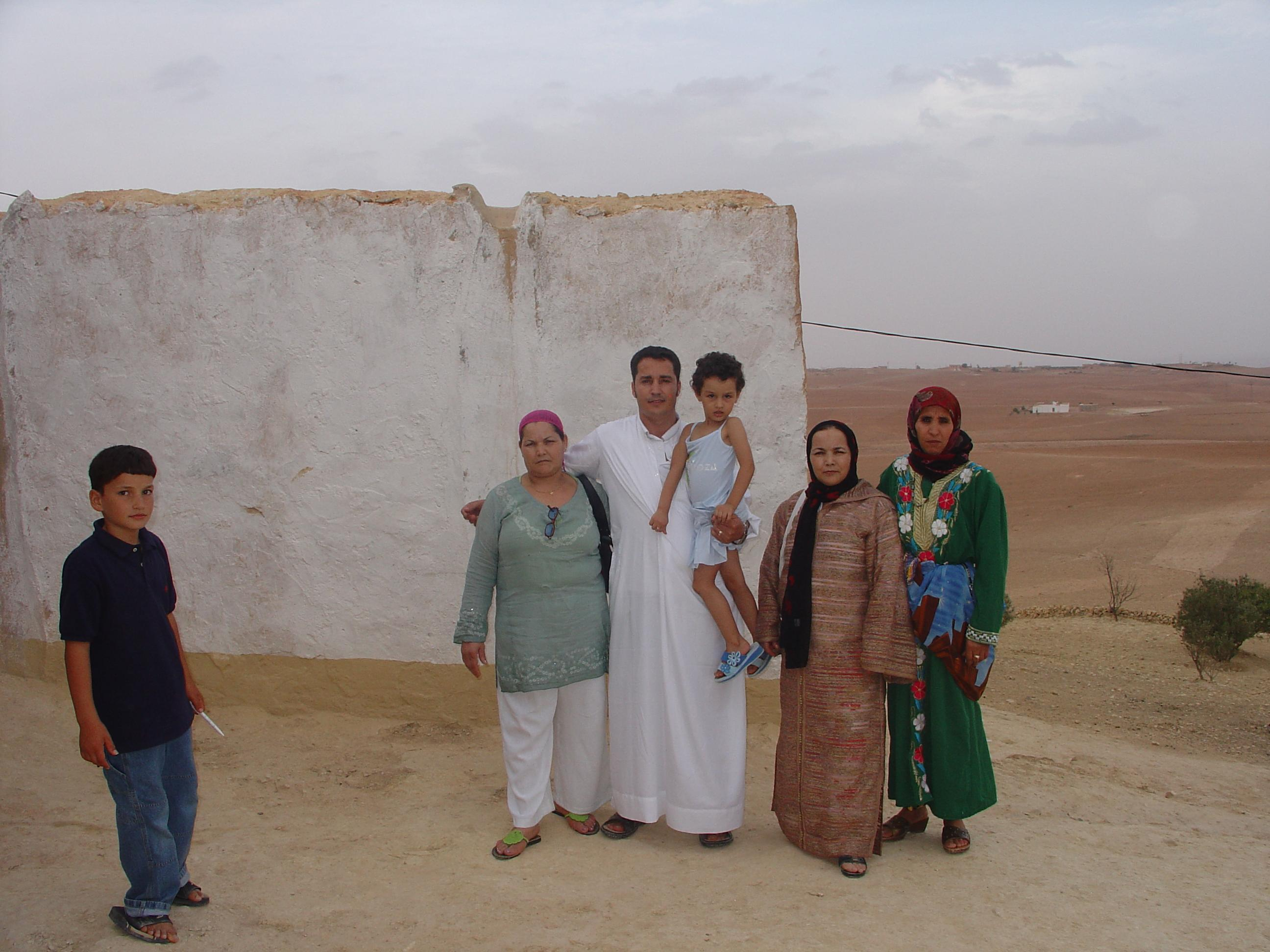
Shilha Berbers in Morocco

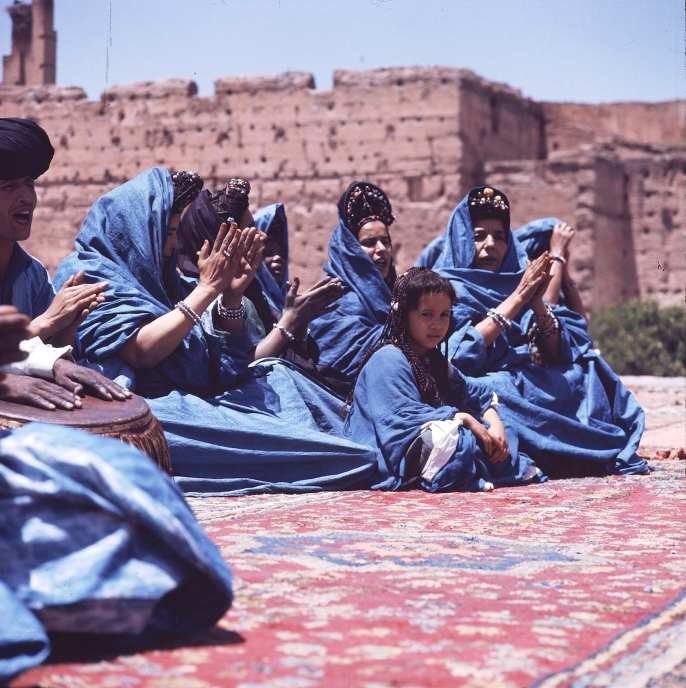
Sanhaja Berber traditional dancers

- Afroasiatic languages
  - Berbers (Imazighen): Morocco, Tunisia, Algeria, Libya, Egypt, Mauritania, Mediterranean Coast, Atlas Mountains (Idurar n Waṭlas), North and Western Sahara
    - Eastern Berbers
      - Nafusa people: Nafusa Mountains (Drar n infusen), Tripolitania, northwestern Libya
      - Zuwara Berbers: Zuwara, coast of western Tripolitania in northwestern Libya.
      - Matmata Berbers: Matmâta, southern Tunisia
      - Djerba Berbers: Djerba Island, southern Tunisia coast
      - Sokna Berbers: Sokna Oasis (Isuknan), Fezzan, north central Libya, Sahara
      - Awjila: Awjila oasis, Cyrenaica, eastern Libya, Sahara
      - Ghadamès: Ghadamès Oasis, western Libya, Sahara
      - Siwis: Siwa Oasis (Isiwan), western Egypt, Sahara
    - Northern Berbers
      - Kabyles (Iqvayliyen): Kabylie (Tamurt n Iqvayliyen), Mediterranean coast of northern Algeria
      - Zenati (Iznaten/Iznasen) speakers: regions in Algeria and Morocco
        - Mozabites (At Mzab): Mzab region, northern Sahara, north central Algeria
        - Shawiya (Išawiyen): Aurès Mountains (Idurar n Awras), northeastern Algeria
        - Shenwa (Ichenwiyen): west-central mountains of northwestern Algeria
        - Riffians (Irifiyen): Rif, Rif Mountains (Arrif), northern Morocco
        - Sanhaja (Iẓnagen/Iẓnajen) peoples: regions in Middle West Atlas Mountains and Eastern Morocco
        - Masmuda peoples: regions in Northern and Western Morocco
          - Ghomara: Far West Rif Mountains (Arrif), Northern Morocco
          - Shilha (Shlḥi): West Atlas Mountains, Western Morocco
- Haratin: Indigenous population of the Maghreb and Sahara of uncertain origin; members now speak either Berber languages or Arabic; inhabit Morocco, Mauritania, Western Sahara, Algeria.
- Serer - current habit Senega, Gambia, Guinea-Bissau and Mauritania
- Toubou: Chad
- Copts (Rem en Khēmi/Rem en Kēme): Egypt, the majority of Egypt's population descended from Ancient Egyptians
- Beja: Northeastern Sudan, between Red Sea coast and almost to the Nile River (White Nile and Blue Nile) eastern banks, Far Northwest Eritrea, Sahara Eastern Desert, Far Southeast Egypt
- Guanches: Canary Islands, Spain

== Eurasia ==
=== West Asia ===
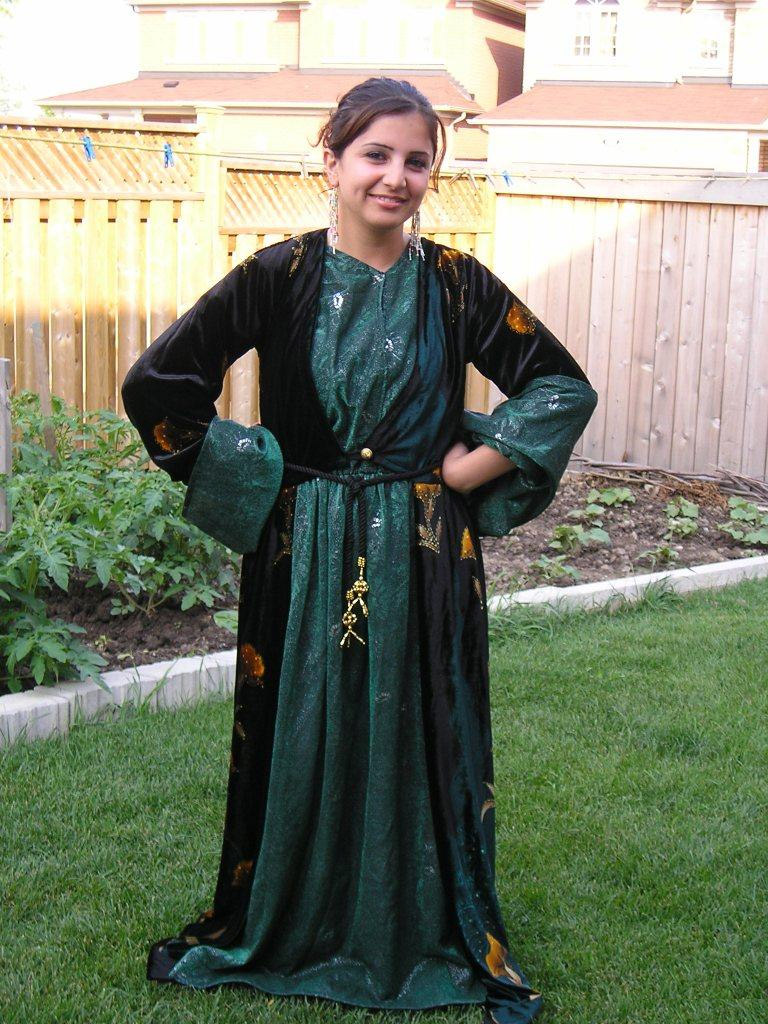
An Assyrian woman wearing traditional clothing in Zakho

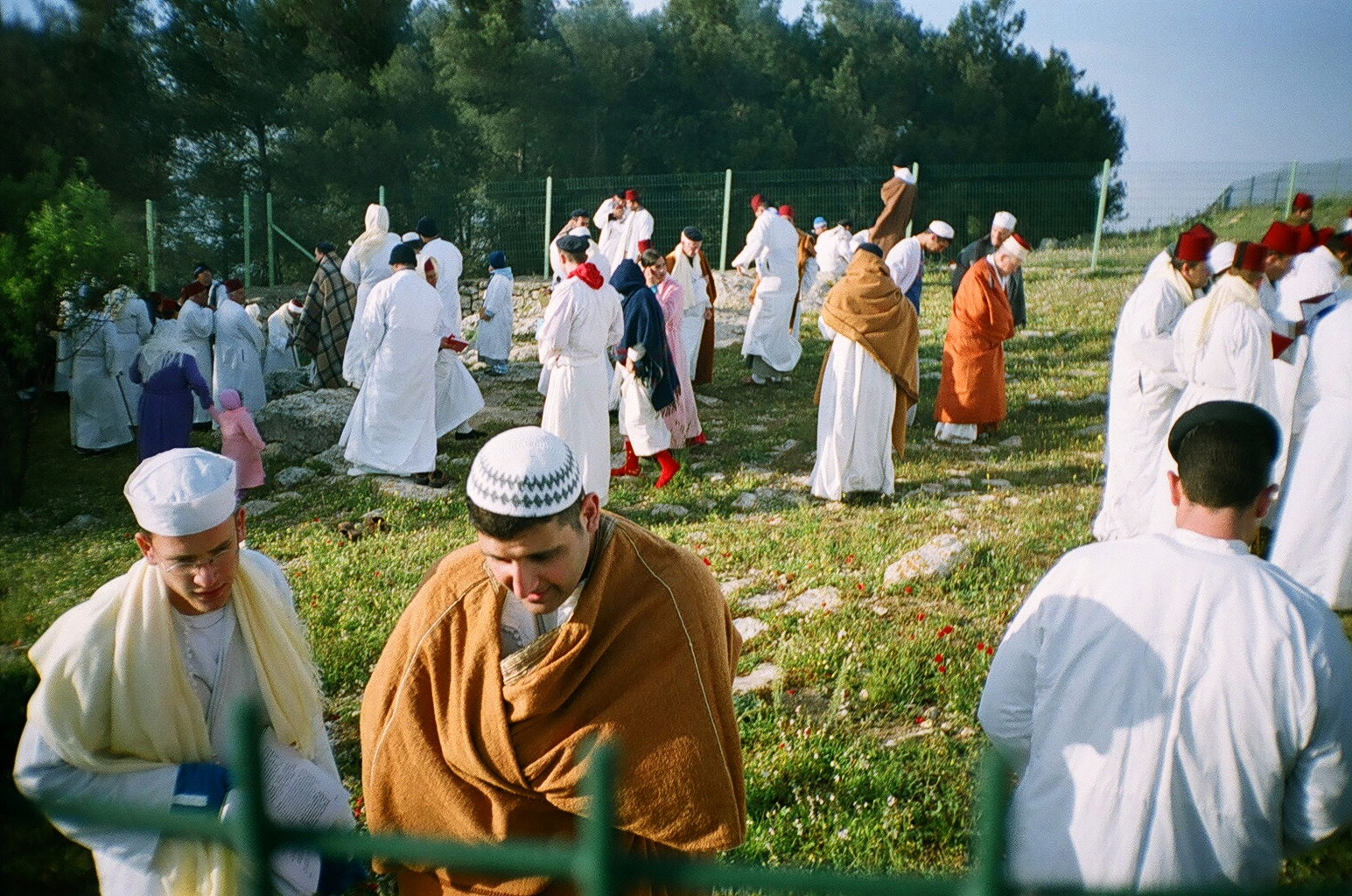
Samaritans on Mount Gerizim

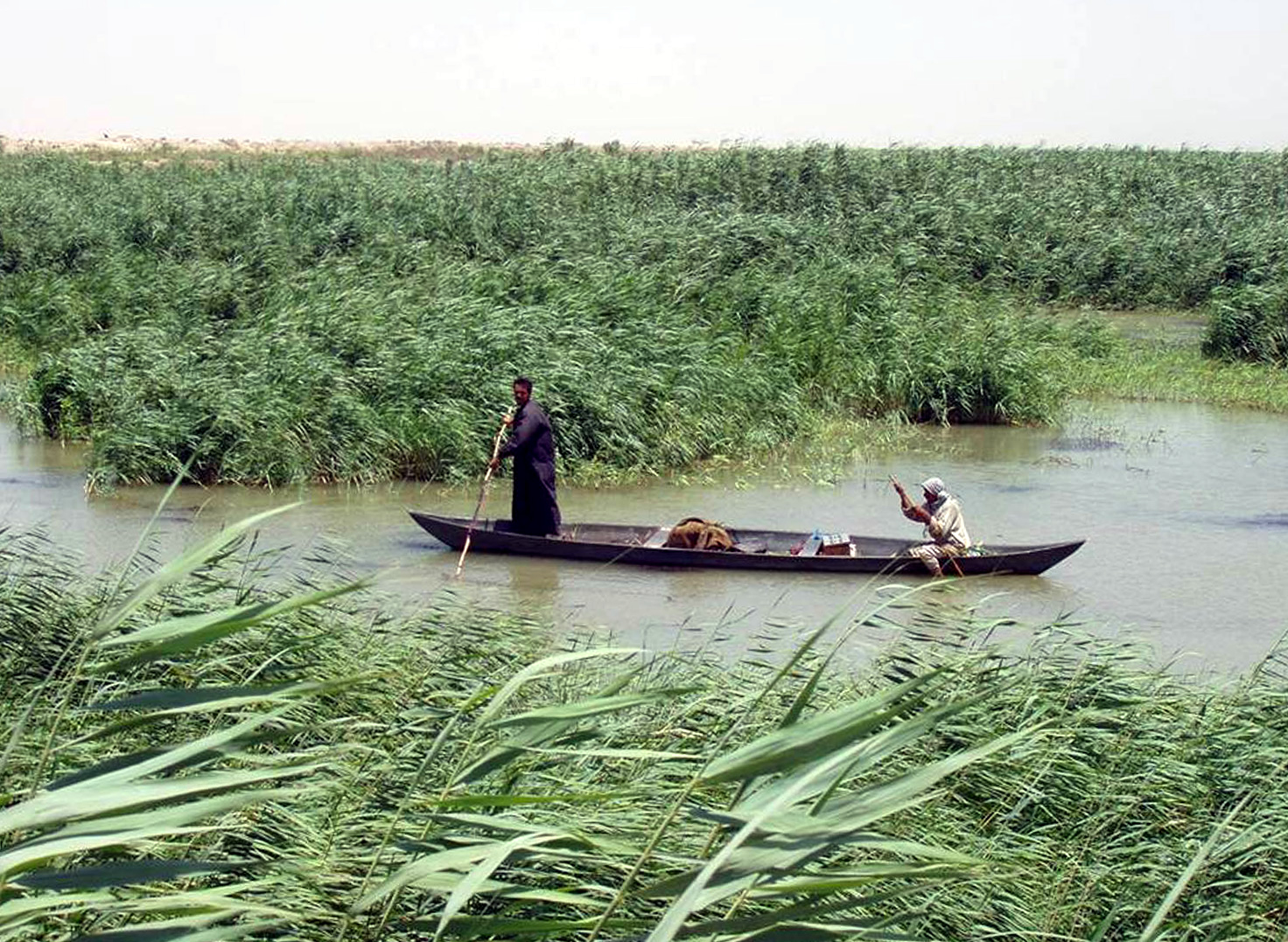
Marsh Arabs/Ma'dan poling a mashoof in the Mesopotamian Marshes

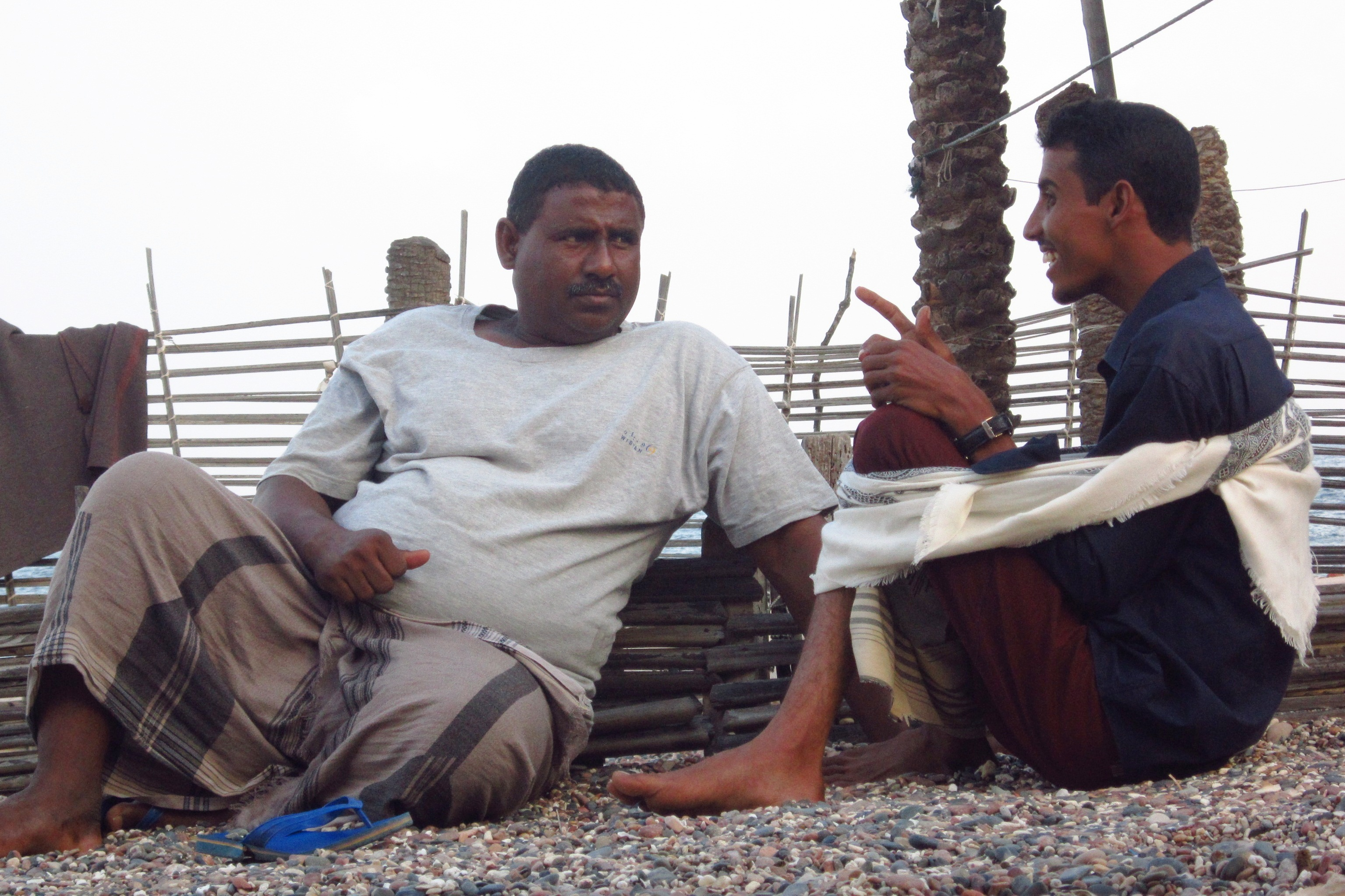
Soqotran men

- Semitic
  - Assyrians (Āṯūrāyē / Sūrāyē / Sūryāyē) originally spoke Akkadian, an East Semitic language, and later adopted Aramaic, a Northwest Semitic language, from the Arameans. There is documented historical continuity between ancient and modern Assyrians, particularly among those who have remained in the Assyrian homeland since antiquity, prior to the Arab conquest of Mesopotamia. Not all Assyrians identify under this designation, and some groups have adopted an Assyrian identity at later points.
  - Central Semitic
    - Northwest Semitic
      - Arameans (Āramayē): Central and Western Syria, ancient land of the Aramaeans (Aram) in the Levant, an Aramaic-speaking people that descends from ancient Aramaeans. In recent years, there has been an attempt to revive Western Aramaic among Aramean Christians living in the Israeli village of Jish.
      - Mandaeans
      - Canaanites
        - Samaritans (Samerim): of Samaria. An ethno-religious group of the Levant, closely related genetically and culturally to the Jewish diaspora and are understood to have branched off from the latter around the time of the Assyrian exile. The Samaritans are adherents of Samaritanism, an Abrahamic religion closely related to Judaism. Their sole norm of religious observance is the Samaritan Pentateuch.
        - Jews: along with Samaritans, descend from the Israelites of the southern Levant, who are believed by archaeologists and historians to have branched out of the Canaanite peoples and culture through the development of a distinct monolatrous—and later monotheistic—religion centered on El/Yahweh, one of the Ancient Canaanite deities. A Jewish diaspora existed for several centuries before the fall of the Second Temple, and their dwelling in other countries for the most part was not a result of compulsory dislocation. Following the Roman Siege of Jerusalem, destruction of Herod's Temple, and failed Jewish revolts, some Jews were either expelled, taken as slaves to Rome, or massacred, while other Jews continued to live in the region over the centuries, despite the conversion of many Jews to Christianity and Islam as well as persecution by the various conquerors of the region, including the Romans, Arabs, Ottomans, and the British. Additionally, a substantial number of diaspora Jews immigrated to Palestine during the 19th and 20th centuries (mainly under the Zionist movement), as well as after the modern State of Israel was established in 1948. This was coupled with the revival of Hebrew, the only Canaanite language still spoken today. Genetic studies of Jews show that many major diaspora Jewish communities derive a substantial portion of their ancestry from ancient Israelites.
        - Due to changes in the demographic history of Palestine, there are competing claims that Jews and Palestinian Arabs are indigenous. The argument entered the Israeli–Palestinian conflict in the 1990s, with Jews claiming indigeneity based on historic ties to the region. Palestinians claim Indigenous status as a pre-existing population displaced by Jewish settlement, and currently constituting a minority in the State of Israel. In 2007, the Negev Bedouin were officially "recognized as an indigenous people of Israel" by the United Nations. This has been criticized both by scholars associated with the Israeli state, who dispute the Bedouin's claim to indigeneity, and those who argue that recognising just one group of Palestinians as Indigenous risks undermining others' claims and "fetishising" nomadic cultures.
    - Arab
      - Bedouin (Badawī) of the interior deserts of Arabia and Syria.
      - Druze (Al-Muwaḥḥidūn/Al-Muwaḥḥidīn/Ahl al-Tawḥīd): of Jabal al-Druze, Syria, Lebanon, Jordan and Israel. The faith of the Druze is a blend of Islam's Ismailism, Judaism, Christianity, Neoplatonism, Pythagoreanism, Gnosticism and Greek philosophy. The foundational text of the faith is the Epistles of Wisdom. Even though they have been a minority for their entire history, they have played a significant role in shaping the history of the Levant. Although the faith originally developed out of Ismaili Islam, Druze are usually not considered Muslims. The oldest and most densely populated Druze communities exist in Mount Lebanon and in the south of Syria around Jabal al-Druze (literally the "Mountain of the Druze").
      - Marsh Dwellers/Marsh Arabs (Ma'dan/ʻArab al-Ahwār): An Arabic-speaking people living in the marshes of southern Iraq or on the Iranian side of the Shatt al-Arab.
  - South Semitic peoples
    - Bathari people: Dhofar, Southern Oman. Descendants from the original people of Dhofar before Arabization.
    - Harasis: Jiddat al-Harasis, Central Oman. Descendants from the original people of South Arabia before Arabization.
    - Hobyót people: Dhofar, Southern Oman, Far Eastern Yemen. Descendants from the original people of Dhofar before Arabization.
    - Mahris: Al-Mahra, Eastern Yemen, Dhofar, Southern Oman. Descendants from the original people of Dhofar before Arabization.
    - Shehri people/Jibbali people: Dhofar, Southern Oman. Descendants from the original people of Dhofar before Arabization.
    - Soqotrans: Soqotra island and group of islands, southeast of mainland Yemen, Indian Ocean. Descendants from the original natives of South Arabia before Arabization.

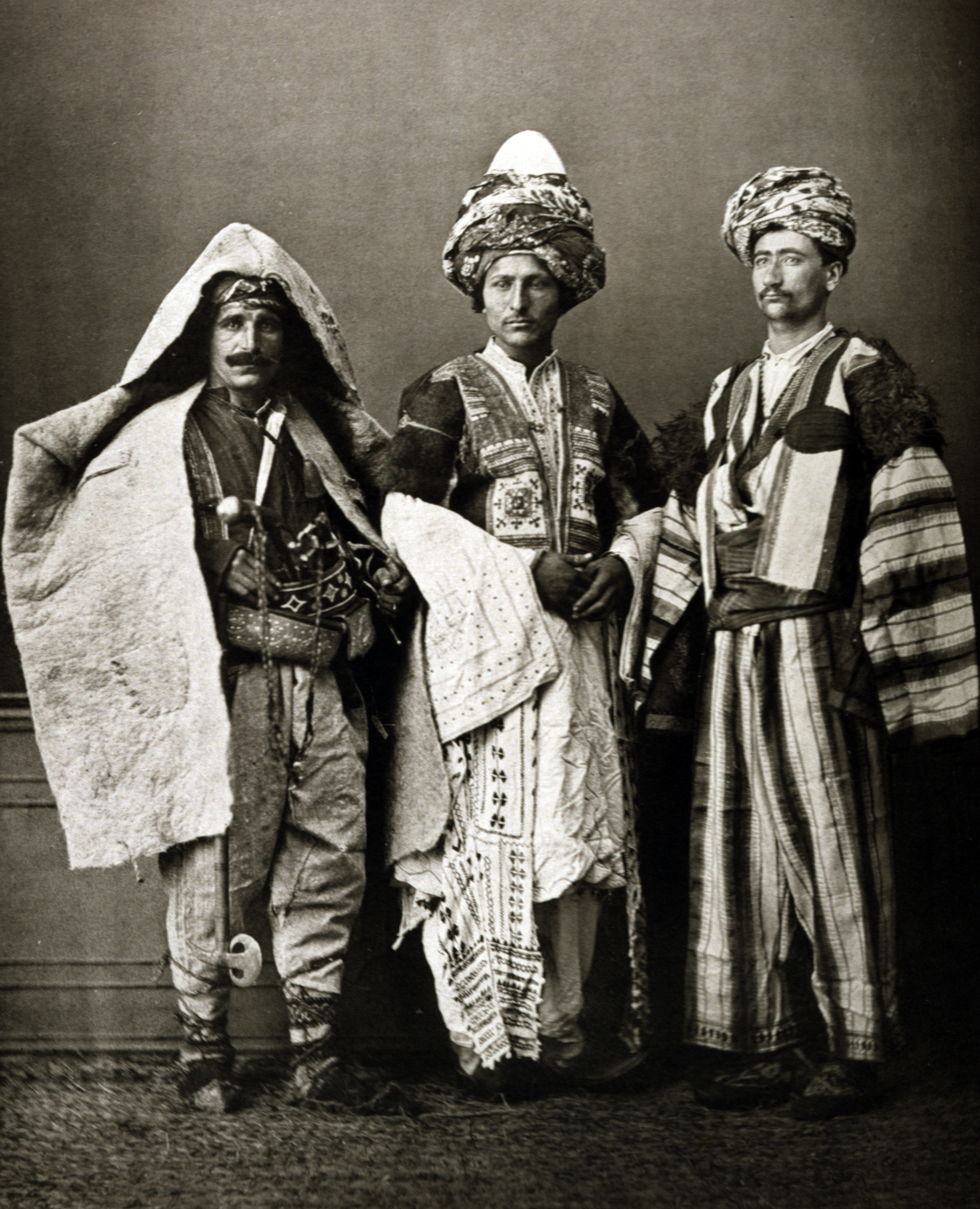
Kurds wearing traditional clothing

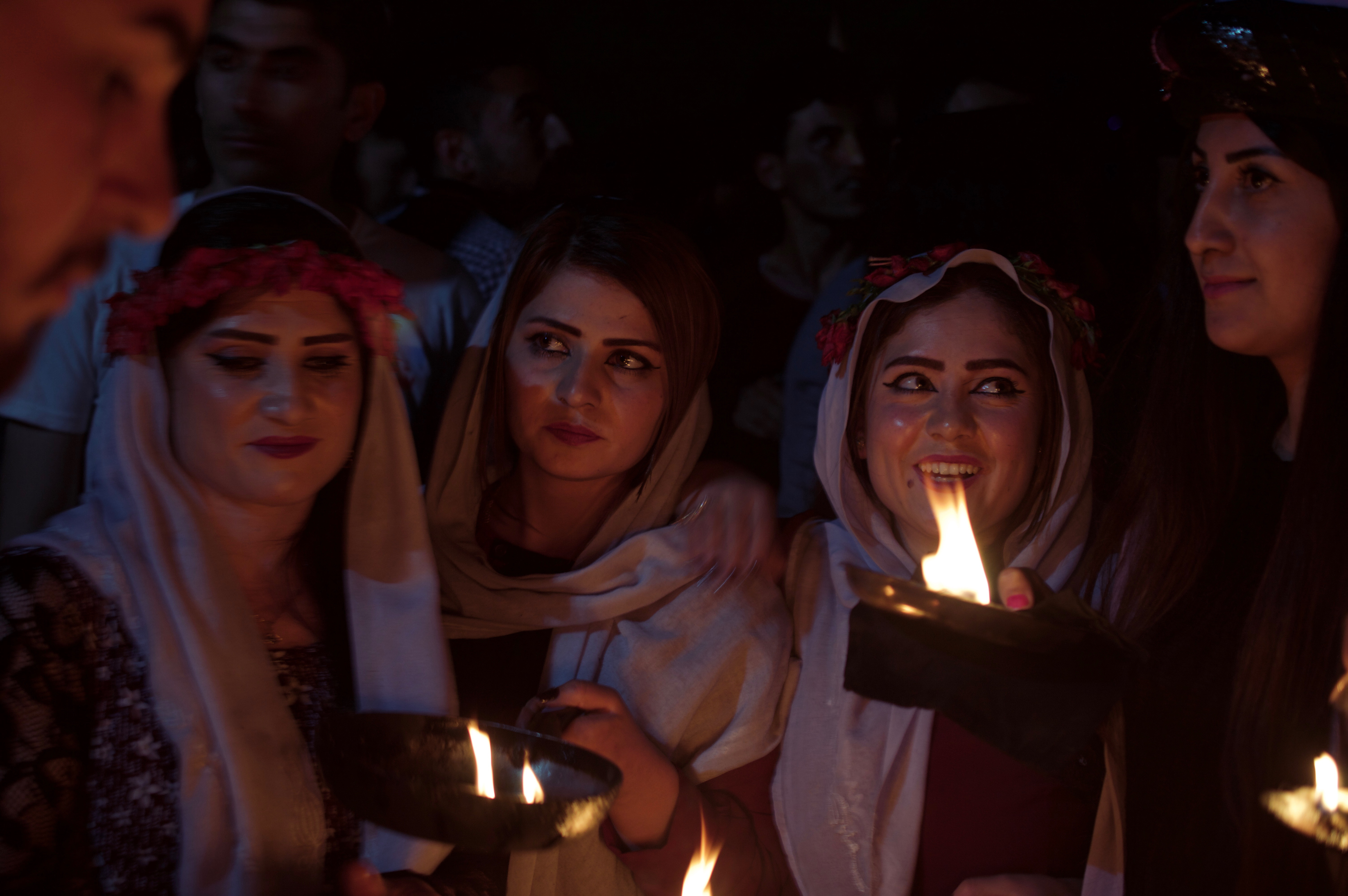
Yazidi festival at Lalish

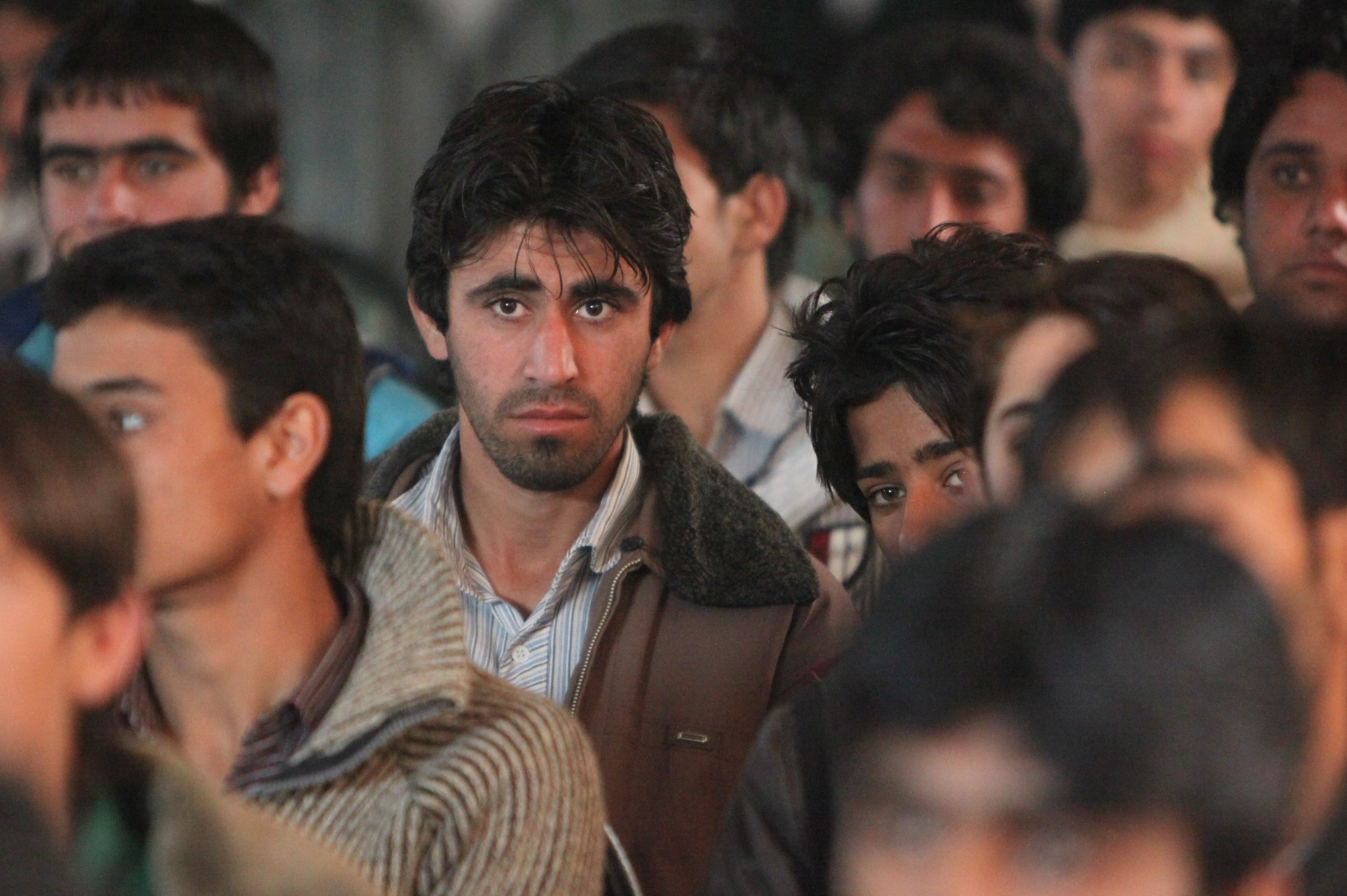
Baloch of Nimruz Province, Afghanistan

- Iranian peoples
  - East Iranian peoples
    - Northeast Iranian peoples
      - Ossetians (Iræттæ): South Ossetia, Georgia, Southern Caucasus Mountains
  - West Iranian peoples
    - Caspian/South Caspian peoples
      - Gilaks: Gilan, North Iran, South Caspian Sea coast and Elburz Mountains
      - Mazanderanis/Mazanis/Tabaris: Mazanderan, Tabaristan, Northern Iran, South Caspian Sea coast and Elburz Mountains
    - Northwest Iranian peoples
      - Northwestern I
        - Kurds (Kurd/Kurmandzh): Kurdistan, Northwestern and Western Iran, Northern Iraq, Northeast and Northern Syria, Southeast Turkey, Zagros and East Anatolian Plateau
          - Yazidis (Êzidî): Nineveh Governorate, Northern Iraq
        - Lak people (Iran): Southwestern Iran, Zagros Mountains
        - Zaza-Gorani peoples
          - Shabaks: Sinjar District of the Nineveh Governorate in northern Iraq.
          - Zazas: Southeastern Turkey, Upper Euphrates river, East Anatolian Plateau
      - Northwestern II
        - Baluchis (Baloch/Baluch): Baluchistan, Southeastern Iran, Southwestern Pakistan, Extreme Southern Afghanistan
        - Tatic peoples
          - Talysh (Talyshon): Talish region (Northwestern Iran, South Azerbaijan, South Caspian Sea coast and Elburz Mountains)
          - Tats (Iran)/South Tats (Irünə Tâtün): Northwest Iran
    - Southwest Iranian peoples
      - Hazaras: Hazarajat, Afghanistan
      - Larestani–Gulf peoples
        - Kumzaris: Northern Musandam, Oman
      - Lurs and Bakhtiaris
        - Lurs (Lur): Luristan, Western and Southwestern Iran, Zagros Mountains
        - Bakhtiaris (Bakhtiar): Southwestern Iran, Zagros
      - Tats (Caucasus): Republic of Azerbaijan, Dagestan (Russia)

==== Caucasus ====
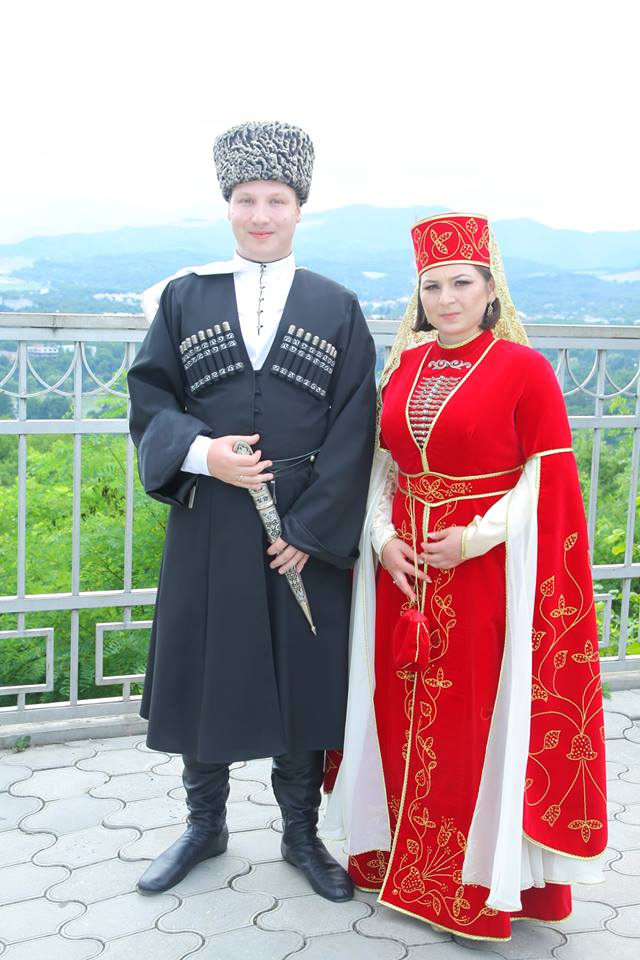
Traditional Adyghe clothing.

- Indo-European peoples
  - Iranian peoples
    - East Iranian peoples
      - Northeast Iranian peoples
        - Ossetians (Iræттæ): Ossetia (Iryston), North Ossetia (Cægat Iryston), a Republic of Russia, and South Ossetia (Khussar Iryston), a area as the Tskhinvali region of Georgia (Sakartvelo), or self-proclaimed sovereign country, North and South slopes of Central Caucasus Mountains.
    - West Iranian peoples
      - Southwest Iranian peoples
        - Tats (Caucasus) (Tati/Parsi/Lohijon/Daghli): East Caucasus Mountains, Azerbaijan
        - Talysh (Caucasus): Caucasus Mountains
- Kartvelian peoples
  - Georgians (Kartvels)
  - Zan
    - Mingrelians
    - Lazs (Lazepe): Southwestern Georgia, Far Northeastern Turkey
  - Svans
- Northeast Caucasian peoples
  - Avar-Andic peoples
    - Avar people (Caucasus) (Magharulal/Avaral): Dagestan, European Russia, Northern Caucasus Mountains
    - Andic peoples
      - Akhvakh (Ashvado/Atluatii)
      - Andis (Qhvannal/Khivannal)
      - Bagvalal (Bagval)
      - Botlikhs (Buykhal'ida/Buykhalyi)
      - Chamalals (Chamalaldu)
      - Godoberis (Giybdiridi)
      - Karatas (Khkhiridi)
      - Tindis (Idarab)
  - Dargins (Darganti): Dagestan, European Russia, Northern Caucasus Mountains
  - Khinalug (Kettiturdur/Kayttiodur/Ketid/Ketsh Khalkh)
  - Lak people (Dagestan): Dagestan, European Russia, Northern Caucasus Mountains
  - Lezgic peoples
    - Aghul (Agular): Dagestan, European Russia, Northern Caucasus Mountains
    - Archins (Arshishttib)
    - Budukh (Budad)
    - Jeks (Cekad/Dzhekad)
    - Kryts (Kh'rytsha'/Kyrtuar)
    - Lezgians (Lezgiyar/Leqer): Dagestan, European Russia, Northern Caucasus Mountains
    - Rutul (Mykhabyr): Dagestan, European Russia, Northern Caucasus Mountains
    - Tabasarans: Dagestan, European Russia, Northern Caucasus Mountains
    - Tsakhur (Yiqby): Azerbaijan, Southern Caucasus Mountains
    - Udins (Udi/Uti): Northern Azerbaijan, Southern Caucasus Mountains
  - Nakh peoples
    - Bats (Batsbi)
    - Vainakh peoples
      - Chechens (Nokhchiy): Chechnya, European Russia, Northern Caucasus Mountains
      - Ingush (Ghalghay): Ingushetia, European Russia, Northern Caucasus Mountains
  - Tsezic (Didoic) peoples
    - Bezhtas
    - Hinukh (Hinuqes)
    - Hunzibs (Hunzib)
    - Khwarshi (Khuani)
    - Tsez/Dido people
- Northwest Caucasian peoples
  - Abkhaz-Abaza peoples
    - Abazins (Abaza)
    - Abkhazians (Aphsua): Abkhazia (Aphsny) - a De Jure autonomous region of Georgia (Sakartvelo), self-proclaimed sovereign country.
  - Circassian peoples
    - West Circassian peoples
    - East Circassian peoples
      - Cherkess (Cherkes): Karachay-Cherkessia, European Russia, Northern Caucasus Mountains
      - Kabardians (Qeberdeykher): Kabardino-Balkaria, European Russia, Northern Caucasus Mountains
  - Karachays (Karachai): Karachay-Cherkessia, North Caucasian peoples, Northern Caucasus Mountains
  - Ubykh (Tʷaχ): were indigenous to the mountains of West Caucasus, Sochi area, Krasnodar Krai, Russia, later migrated to Turkey.

=== Central Asia ===
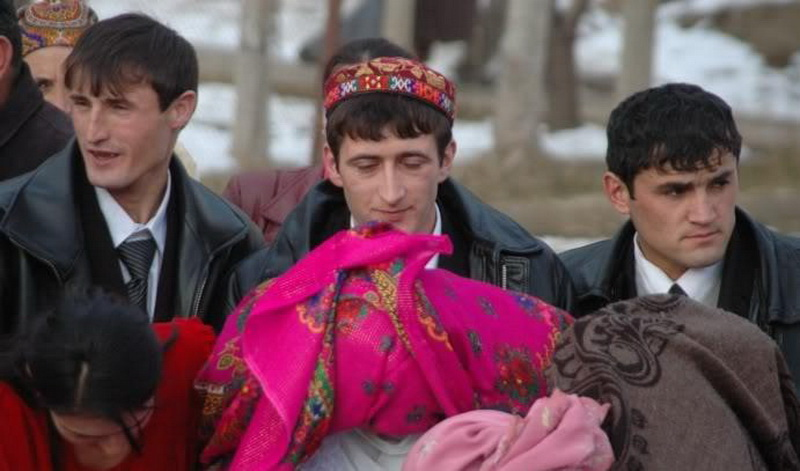
Pamiri people of Tajikistan

- Indo-European peoples
  - Iranian peoples
    - East Iranian peoples
      - Northeast Iranian peoples
        - Pamiris (Pomir): Badakhshan (Afghanistan, Tajikistan), Pamir Mountains, Tashkurgan (in Xinjiang)
        - Tajiks: Tajikistan
        - Yaghnobi (Yaγnōbī́t): Tajikistan
  - Turkic peoples
    - Kipchak Turks (Northwestern Common Turkic peoples)
      - Kazakhs: Kazakhstan, China, Mongolia, Russia

=== South Asia ===
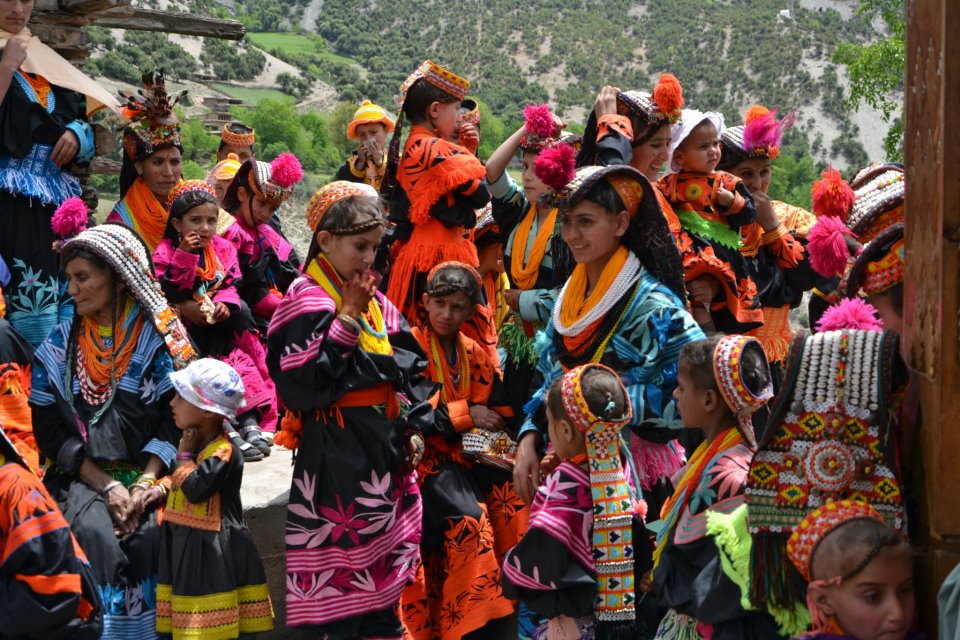
Kalash in traditional dress, Pakistan

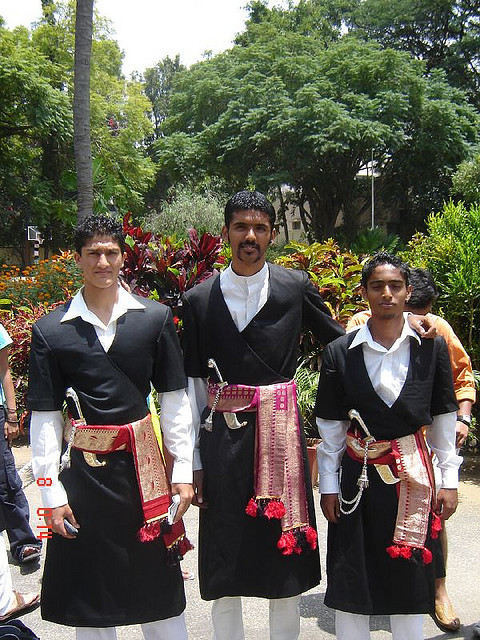
Kodava men in traditional attire, India

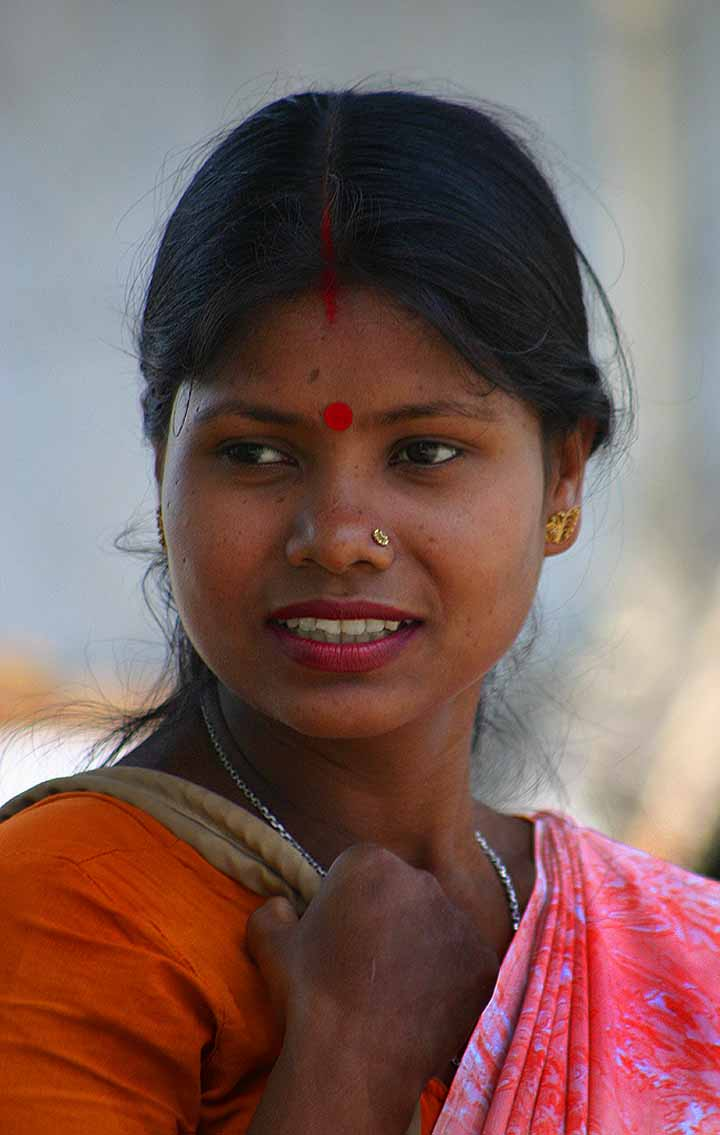
An Indigenous Assamese woman of Assam

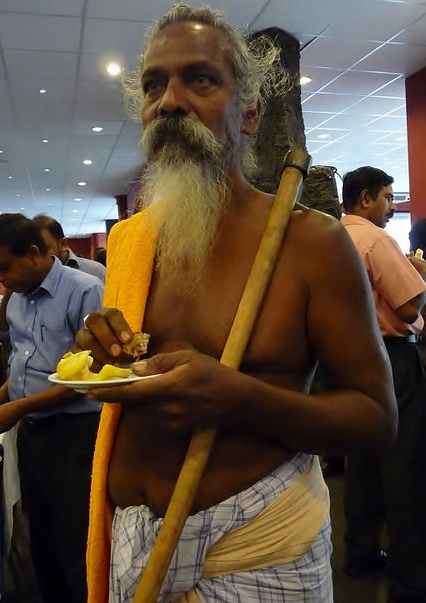
Veddha Chief Uruwarige Wannila Aththo, leader of the Indigenous people of Sri Lanka

==== Pakistan ====
- Burusho: Hunza and Chitral districts, Gilgit-Baltistan, Northern Pakistan
- Torwali: Swat District, northern Pakistan
- Gawri: Swat and Upper Dir districts, northern Pakistan

==== India ====
- Adivasis: collective term for many Indigenous peoples in India
  - Dravidian peoples
    - Badaga: Tamil Nadu, South India
    - Gond: Gondwana Land, Central India
    - Irula: Tamil Nadu, South India
    - Kisan: Indigenous peoples of the Odisha, East India
    - Kodava: Kodagu, Karnataka, South India
    - Kota (Kothar/Kov): Tamil Nadu, South India
    - Kuruba: Andhra Pradesh, Karnataka, Tamil Nadu, South India
    - Toda: Tamil Nadu, South India
    - South Dravidian peoples
      - Giraavaru: Maldives
  - Indo-European peoples
    - Banjara: Rajasthan
    - Bhil people: Gujarat, Rajasthan, Madhya Pradesh
    - Assamese people

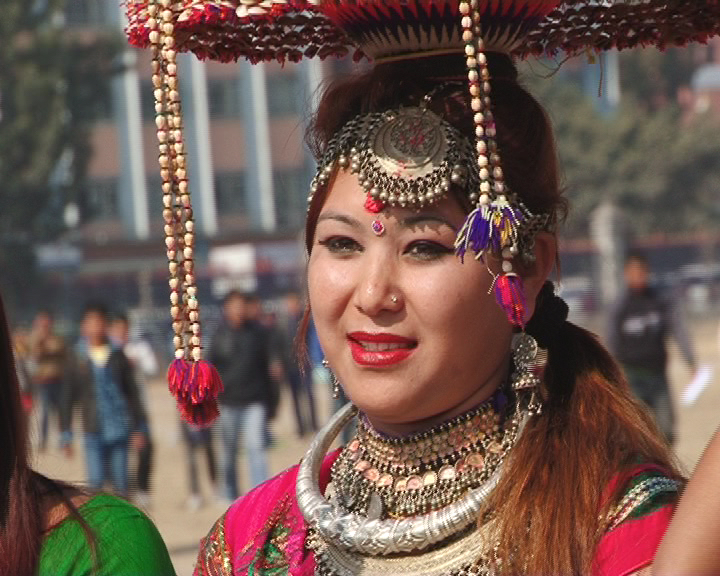
Indigenous Tharu woman from Southern Nepal

    - Tharu: Nepal, East India
    - Warli
  - Sino-Tibetan-speaking peoples
    - Bodish peoples
      - Ladakhi: Ladakh, North India
    - Konyak peoples
      - Nocte: Tirap, Arunachal Pradesh, North-East India
    - Kukish peoples
      - Karbi: Karbi Anglong, Assam, North-East-India
      - Mizo (Mizo hnam): Mizoram, North-East India
      - Naga: Nagaland, North-East India
    - Raji-Raute peoples
      - Raute: Nepal, Uttarakhand
    - Tripuri (Borok): Tripura, North-East India
  - Digaro peoples
    - Mishmi: Arunachal Pradesh, North-East India
  - Jumma people (a collective term for several peoples)
    - Chakma: Bangladesh, Arunachal Pradesh - North-East India
  - Indigenous peoples of Sikkim: India
    - Sino-Tibetan-speaking peoples
      - Bodish peoples
        - Bhutia (Denzongpa)
      - Lepcha (Róng ʔágít/Róngkup/Mútuncí Róngkup Rumkup)
      - Meitei: Manipur, North-East India
- Sino-Tibetan-speaking peoples
  - Lolo-Burmese peoples
    - Burmish peoples
      - Marma: Bangladesh
  - Meitei people: Manipur and neighboring states of India, Bangladesh, Myanmar
- Vedda (Wanniyala-Aetto): Sri Lanka

==== Andaman and Nicobar Islands ====
- Negrito:
  - Andamanese, in the Andaman Islands, which include:
    - Great Andamanese: formerly at least 10 distinct groups living throughout Great Andaman, now confined to a single community on Strait Island, Andaman Is.
    - Jangil (Rutland Jarawa): now extinct, formerly of Rutland Island, Andamans
    - Jarawa: South Andaman and Middle Andaman
    - Onge (Önge): Little Andaman, Andaman Islands
    - Sentinelese (?): North Sentinel Island, Andaman Islands
- Austroasiatic peoples
  - Nicobarese people (Holchu): Nicobar Islands, India
  - Shompen people (Kalay-Keyet): Nicobar Islands, India

=== Northeast Asia ===
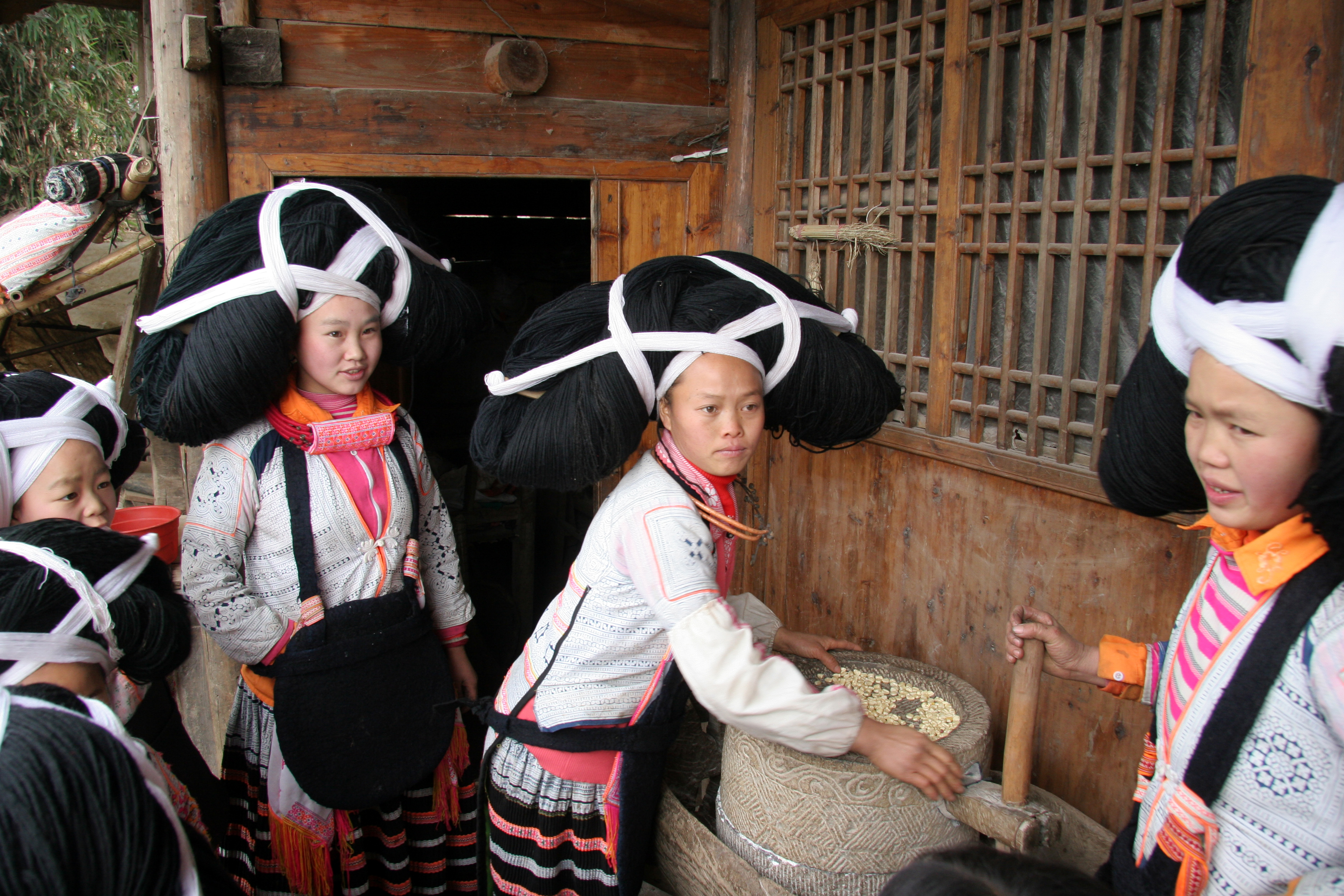
Miao (Hmong) girls in China

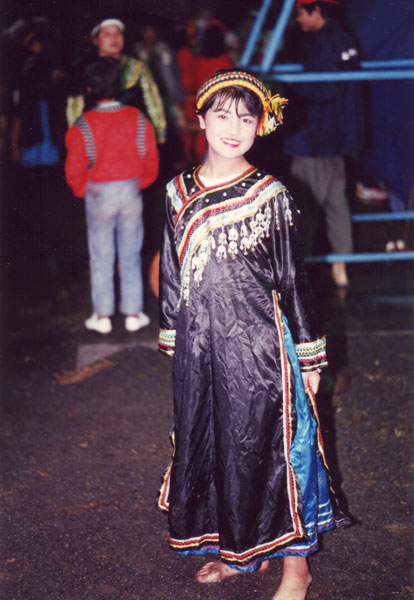
Bunun dancer

==== China ====
Western China

- Turkic peoples
  - Common Turkic
    - Karluks (Southeastern Common Turkic peoples)
      - Uyghurs (Uyghur): Tarim Basin, Southern Xinjiang, China
      - Ili Turks: Ili Kazakh Autonomous Prefecture, Northern Xinjiang, China
      - Äynus: Taklamakan Desert, Southwestern Xinjiang, China
      - Yugur (Yogïr/Sarïg Yogïr): Sunan Yugur Autonomous County, Gansu province, China
      - Salar (Salır): Xunhua Salar Autonomous County, Qinghai province, China
    - Kipchaks (Northwestern Common Turkic peoples)
      - Kazakhs: Kazakhstan, China, Mongolia, Russia
      - Kyrgyzs: Kyrgyzstan, China
- Tibetan peoples
- Mongolic peoples
  - Oirats (Oirad/Oird) (Dzungars and Torghuts): Dzungaria (Northern Xinjiang), China

North China

- Fuyu Kyrgyz: Fuyu County, Heilongjiang
- Hui peoples
- Tungusic peoples
  - Northern Tungusic peoples
    - Nanai (Hezhen/Nanai/Hezhe/Golds/Samagir): Heilongjiang in China, Khabarovsk Krai and Primorsky Krai in Russia
    - Oroqen: Far Northern China
  - Southern Tungusic peoples
    - Manchus (Manju/Manchu people): Manchuria, northeast China

South China

- Hmong–Mien peoples
  - Miao: Southern China (provinces of Guizhou, Yunnan, Sichuan, Hubei, Hunan, Guangxi, Guangdong and Hainan), Myanmar, northern Vietnam, Laos and Thailand
  - Hmong: Southern China, Vietnam and Laos
  - Yao (Mien): Southern China (provinces Hunan, Guangdong, Guangxi, Guizhou, and Yunnan)

==== Mongolia ====
- Mongolic peoples
  - Central Mongolic peoples
    - Khoid: Mongolia
    - Mangud: Historically Mongolia
    - Naimans (Nayman): Inner Mongolia, China
    - Sartuul: Zavkhan, Mongolia
- Turkic peoples
  - Common Turks
    - Karluks (Southeastern Common Turkic peoples)
      - Dukha (Dukha/Dukhans/Duhalar/Tsaatan): Mongolia
      - Uriankhai (Wūliánghǎi/Uriankhan/урианхан/Uriankhat/урианхад): Mongolia

==== Taiwan ====
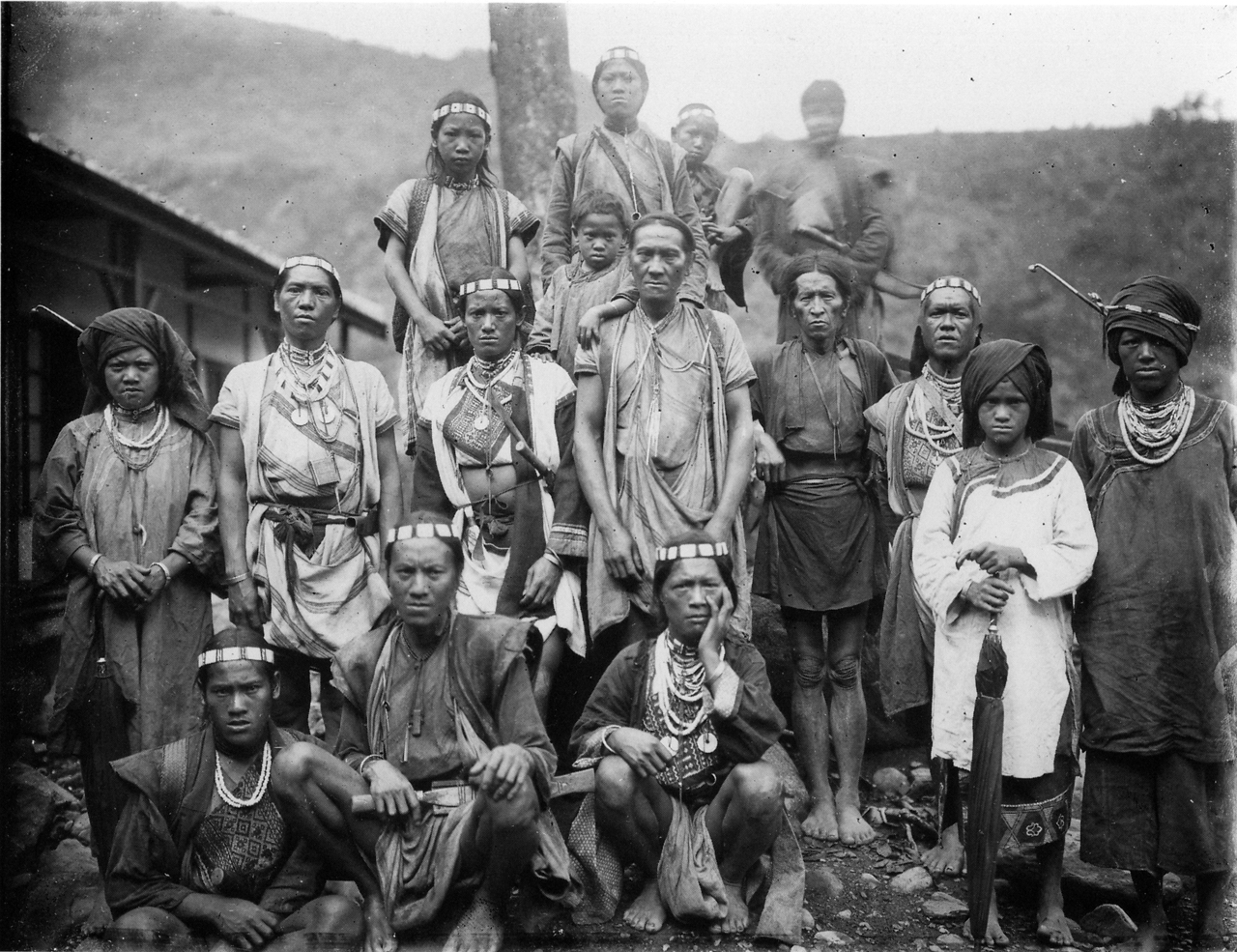
Bunun in 1900. Photograph by Torii Ryūzō

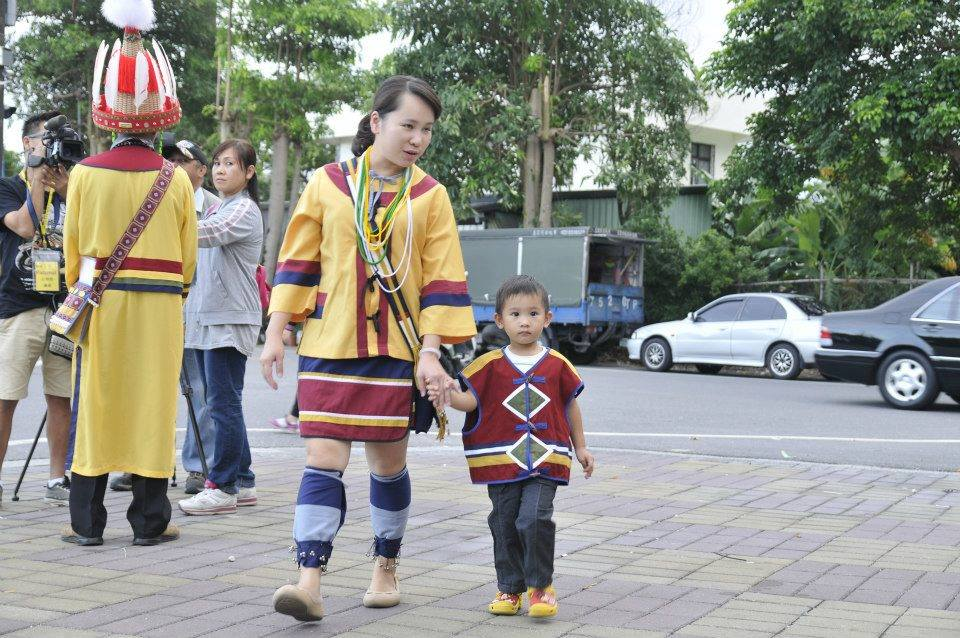
Sakizaya

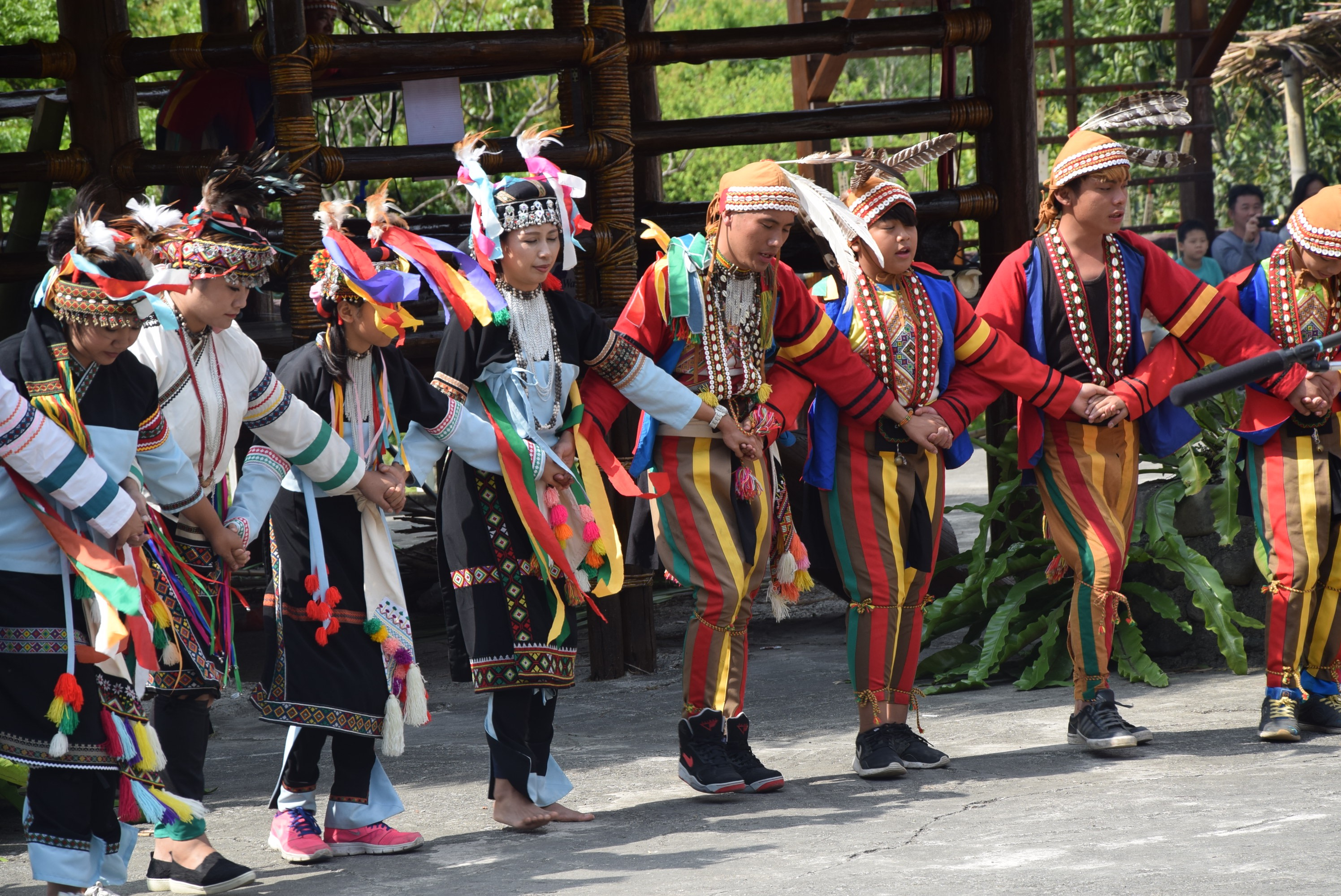
Saaroa people

- Indigenous peoples of the island of Taiwan
  - Amis (Pangcah)
  - Arikun
  - Atayals (Tayal; Tayan)
  - Babuza
  - Basay
  - Bunun
  - Hla'alua (Saaroa)
  - Kanakanavu
  - Kavalan (Kebalan; Kbaran)
  - Ketagalan
  - Lloa
  - Makatao
  - Paiwan (Payuan)
  - Papora
  - Pazeh
    - Kaxabu
  - Puyuma (Pinuyumayan)
  - Rukai (Drekay)
  - Saisiyat (Say-Siyat)
  - Sakizaya
  - Seediq
  - Siraya
  - Taivoans
  - Tao (Yami)
  - Taokas
  - Taroko (Truku)
  - Thao (Ngan)
  - Tsou (Cou)

==== Japan ====
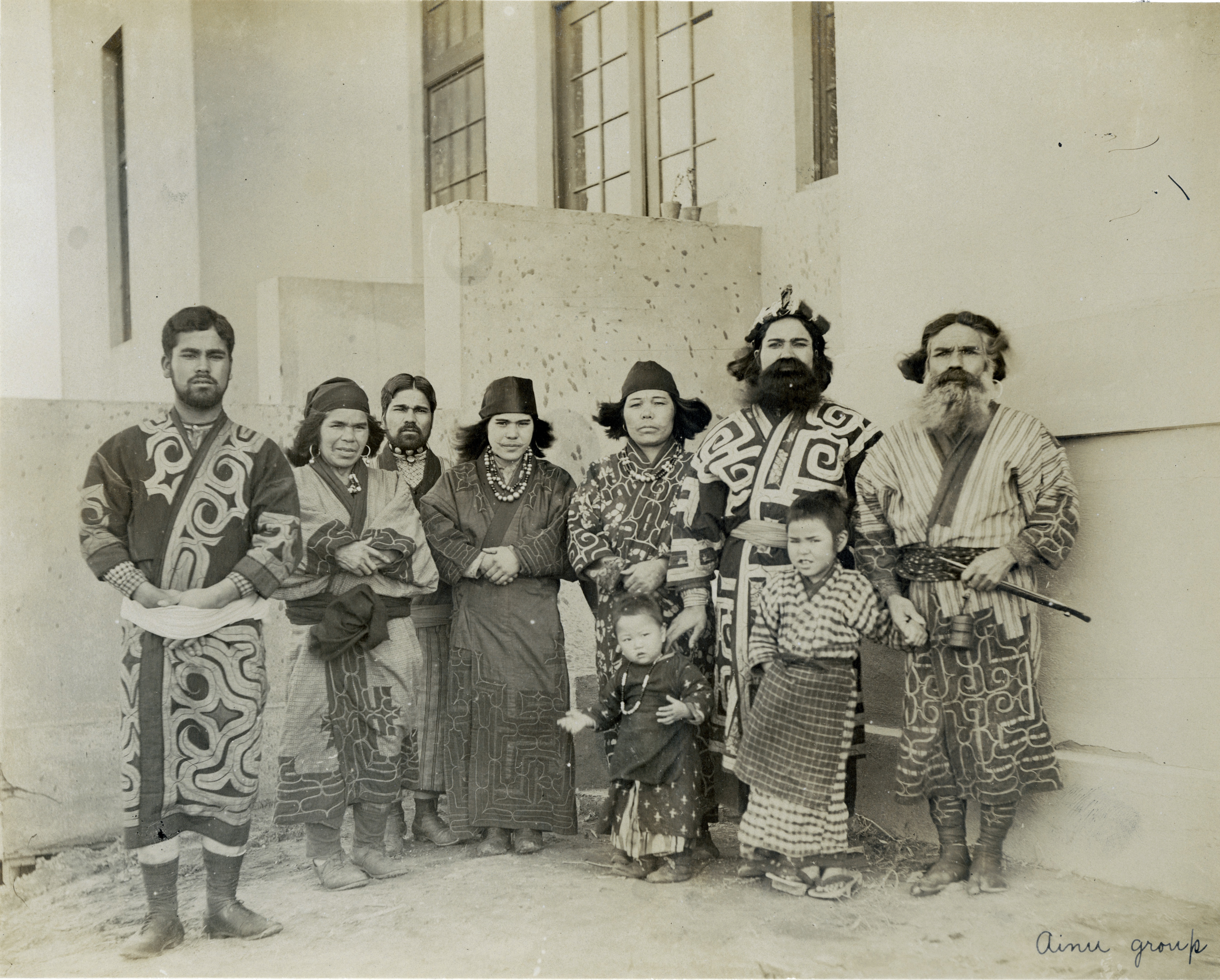
Ainu people of Hokkaido, 1904

- Ainu (Aynu): Hokkaido, Japan and Sakhalin and the Kuril Islands, Russia
- Bonin Islanders: Bonin Islands, Japan
- Ryukyuans (Ruuchuu Minzuku): Old Ryūkyū Kingdom, now Japan

==== Siberia and Far East of Russia ====
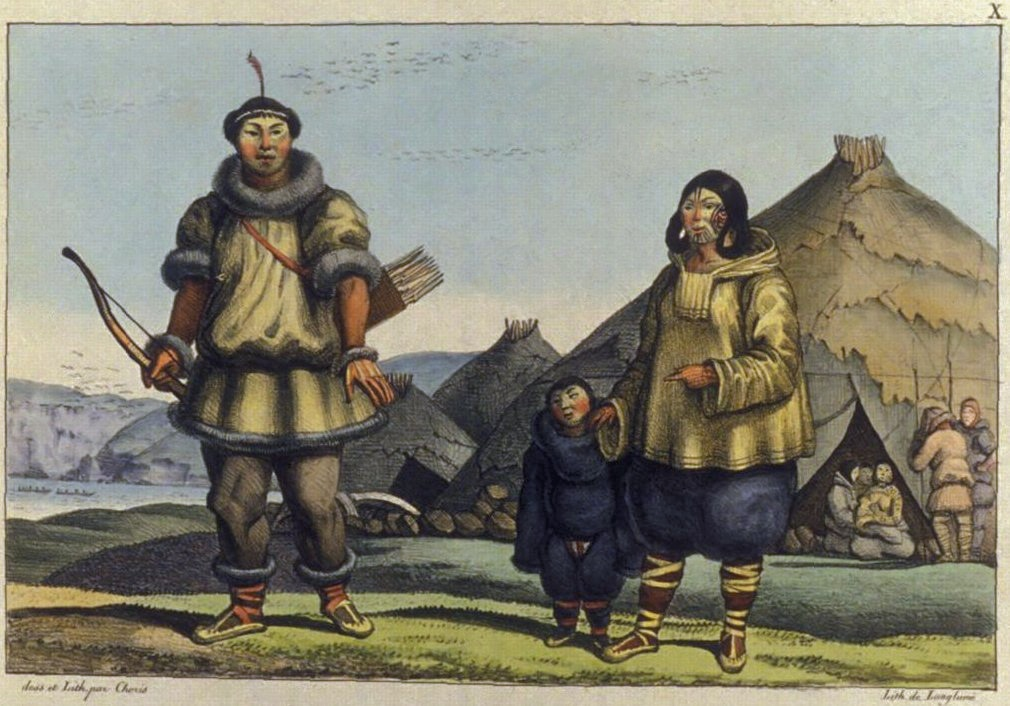
Representation of a Chukchi family by Louis Choris (1816)

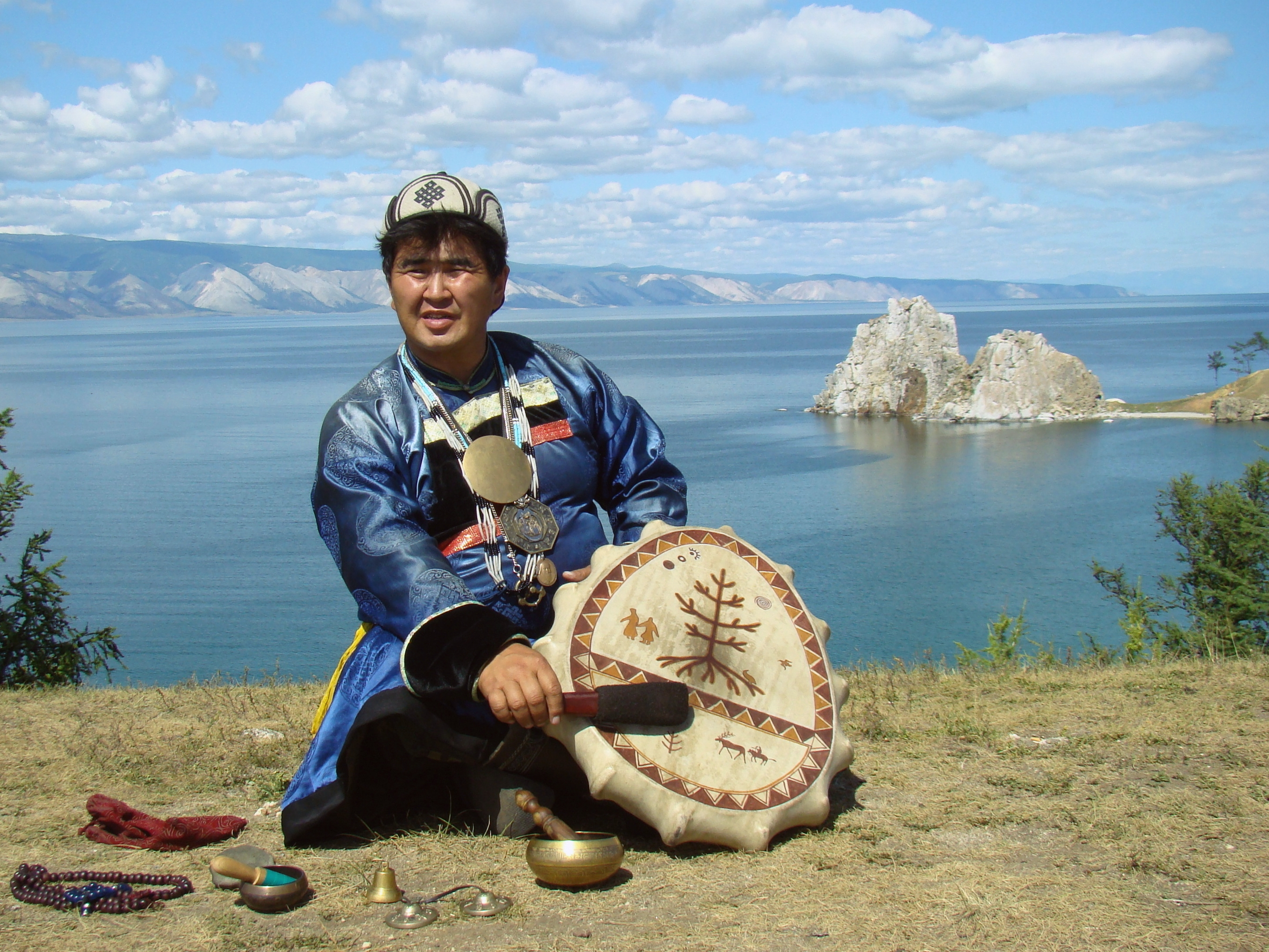
Buryat shaman of Olkhon, Lake Baikal in eastern Siberia.

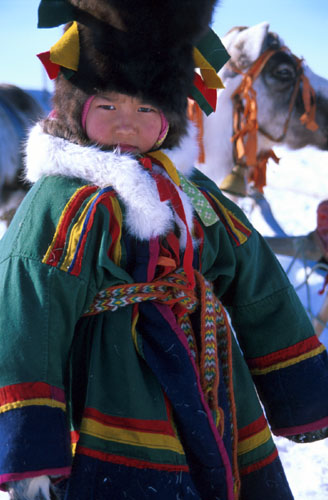
Nenets child

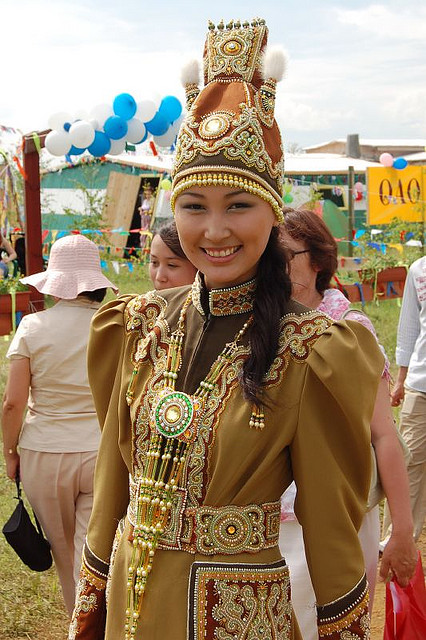
Yakut woman

Over 40 distinct peoples, each with their own language and culture in the Asiatic part of Russia (Siberia and Far East).

- Chukchi-Kamchatkan peoples
  - Chukchi: mainly in Chukotka Autonomous Okrug
  - Kereks: Beringovsky District
  - Koryaks: former Koryak Autonomous Okrug
    - Alyutors: northern reaches of the Koryak Autonomous Okrug
  - Itelmens: Kamchatka Peninsula
- Chuvans: Chukotka Autonomous Okrug
- Eskimo-Aleut peoples
  - Aleuts, Aleutian Islands, Pribilof Islands and the southwestern tip of the Alaska Peninsula
  - Yupik: Northeastern Russia, Alaska, Canada and Greenland
    - Siberian Yupik: Northeastern Russia
      - Sirenik Eskimos, Russian Far East.
      - Naukan, Russian Far East.
- Kamchadal: Kamchatka and Magadan Oblasts
- Mongolic peoples
  - Buryats (Buryaad): Buryatia, Russia, and Mongolia
  - Hamnigans: Zabaykalsky Krai, Russia, Mongolia, and China
- Taz people, Olginsky District, Primorsky Krai
- Tungusic peoples
  - Evenks: Russia, Mongolia and northeastern China.
    - Evens: Northeastern Siberia
  - Nanai people: Amur River basin
  - Ulch people: Lower Amur watershed
  - Negidal people: Russian Far East
  - Oroch people: Khabarovsk Krai
  - Oroks: Sakhalin Island
  - Udege: Russian Far East
- Turkic peoples
  - Siberian Turks
    - Altaians: Altai Republic
      - Chelkans, mainly in the Turochaksky District
      - Telengits
      - Tubalars
    - Chulyms: Tomsk Oblast, Russia
    - Dolgans: Krasnoyarsk Krai
    - Khakas (Tadarlar): titular nation of Khakassia, Russia
    - Kumandins: Altai Krai, Russia
    - Shors: Southern Siberia, core population in Kemerovo Oblast
    - Soyots: Buryatia
    - Teleuts: Southwestern Siberia
    - Tofalars: Southern Siberia
    - Tuvans: Tuva Republic
      - Tozhu Tuvans
    - Yakuts (Sakha): titular nation of Yakutia, Russia
  - Kipchak Turks
    - Siberian Tatars
      - Baraba Tatars
      - Kumandins: Southwestern Siberia
- Uralic peoples
  - Ob-Ugric peoples
    - Khanty: Western Siberia
    - Mansi: Western Siberia
  - Samoyedic peoples
    - Enets: northern Krasnoyarsk Krai
    - Nenets: Northwestern Siberia and Far Northern European Russia
    - Nganasan: Northern end of Taymyr Peninsula
    - Selkup people: Between Ob and Yenisey Rivers
- Yukaghir people: Eastern Siberia
- Yeniseian peoples
  - Ket people: along the middle branch of Yenisey River
- Nivkh: Amur River lowlands and Sakhalin Island

=== Southeast Asia ===
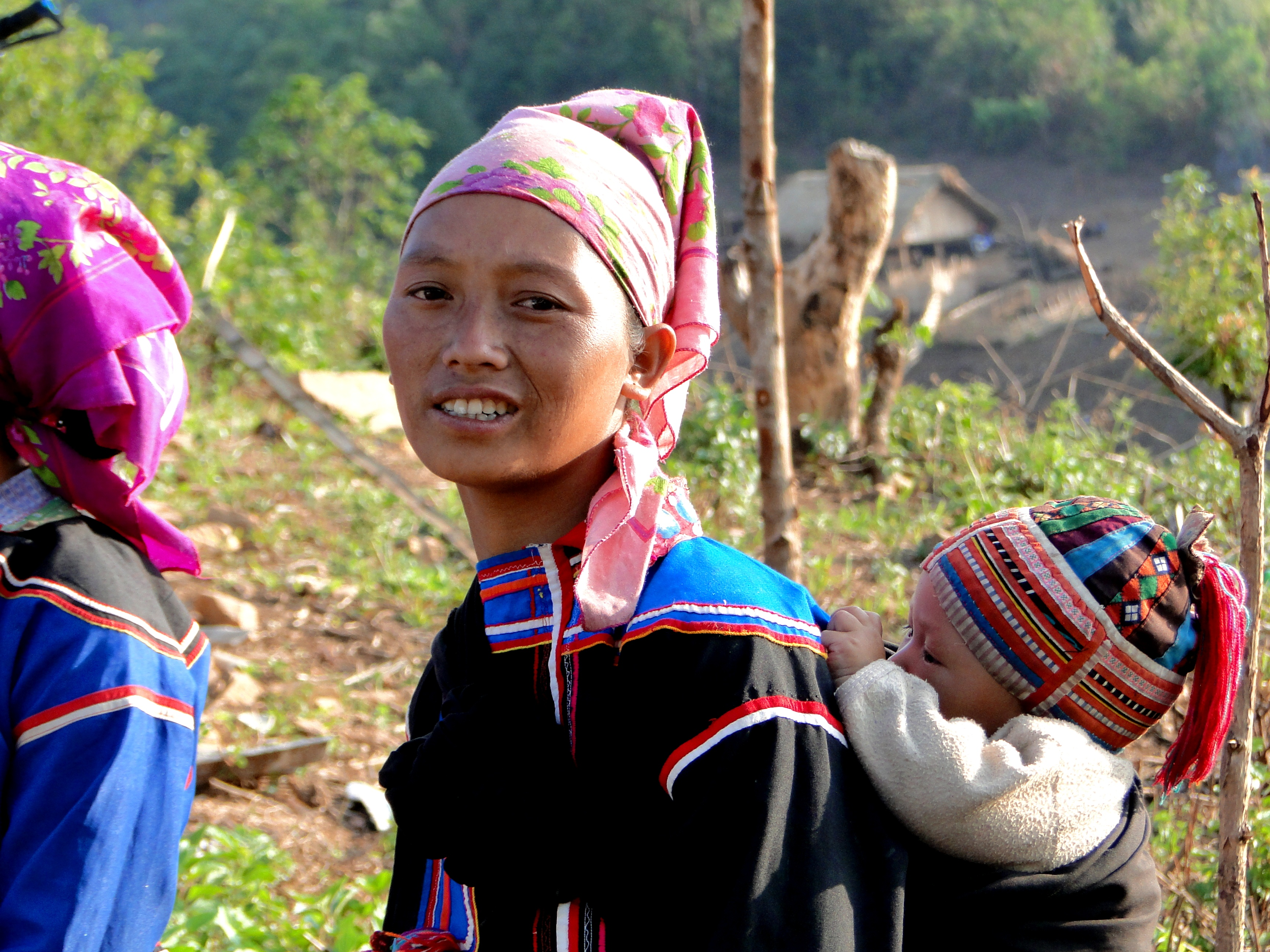
A Wa woman carrying her child

==== Mainland Southeast Asia (Indochina Peninsula) ====
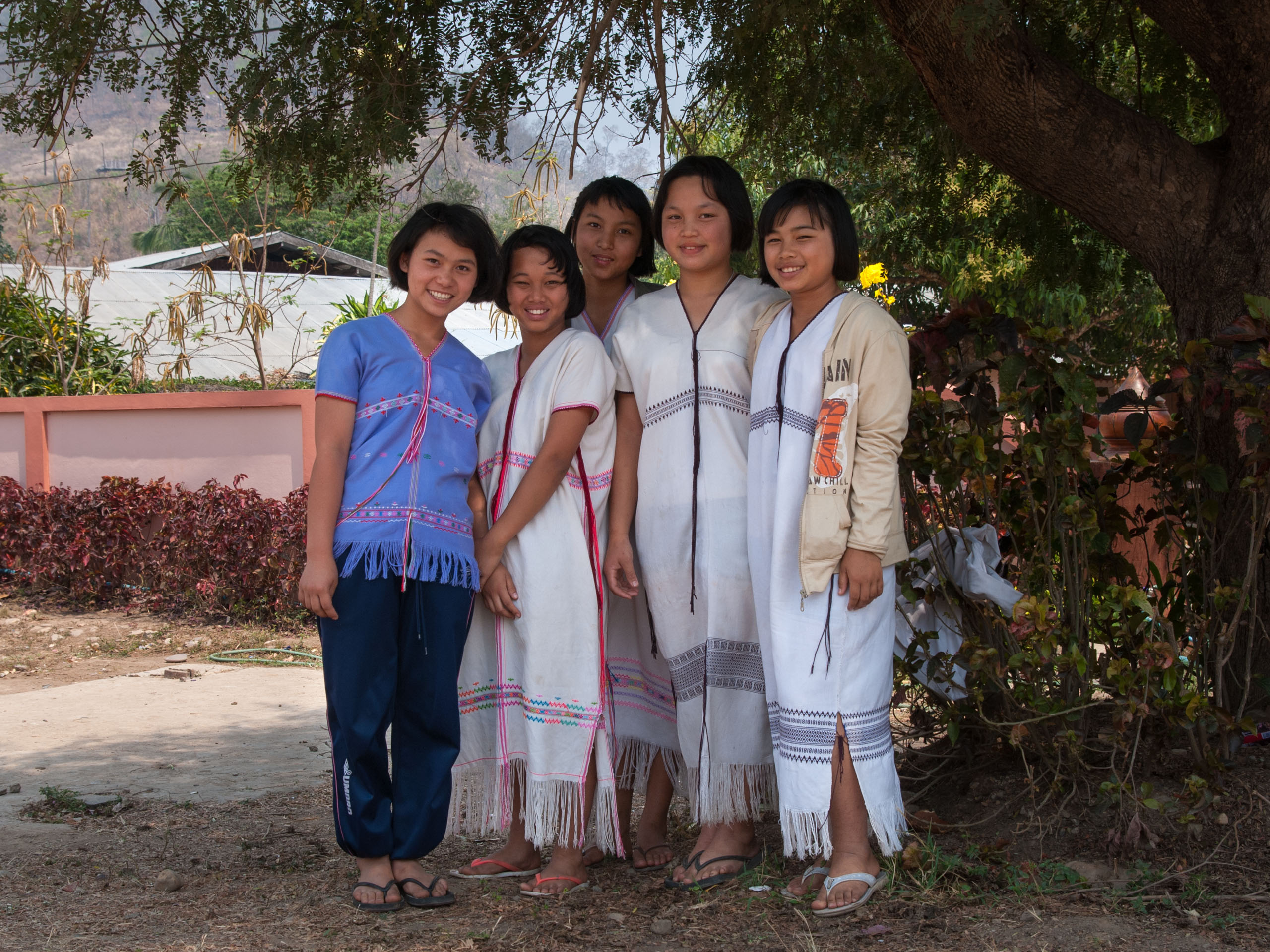
S'gaw Karen girls of Khun Yuam District, Mae Hong Son Province, Thailand

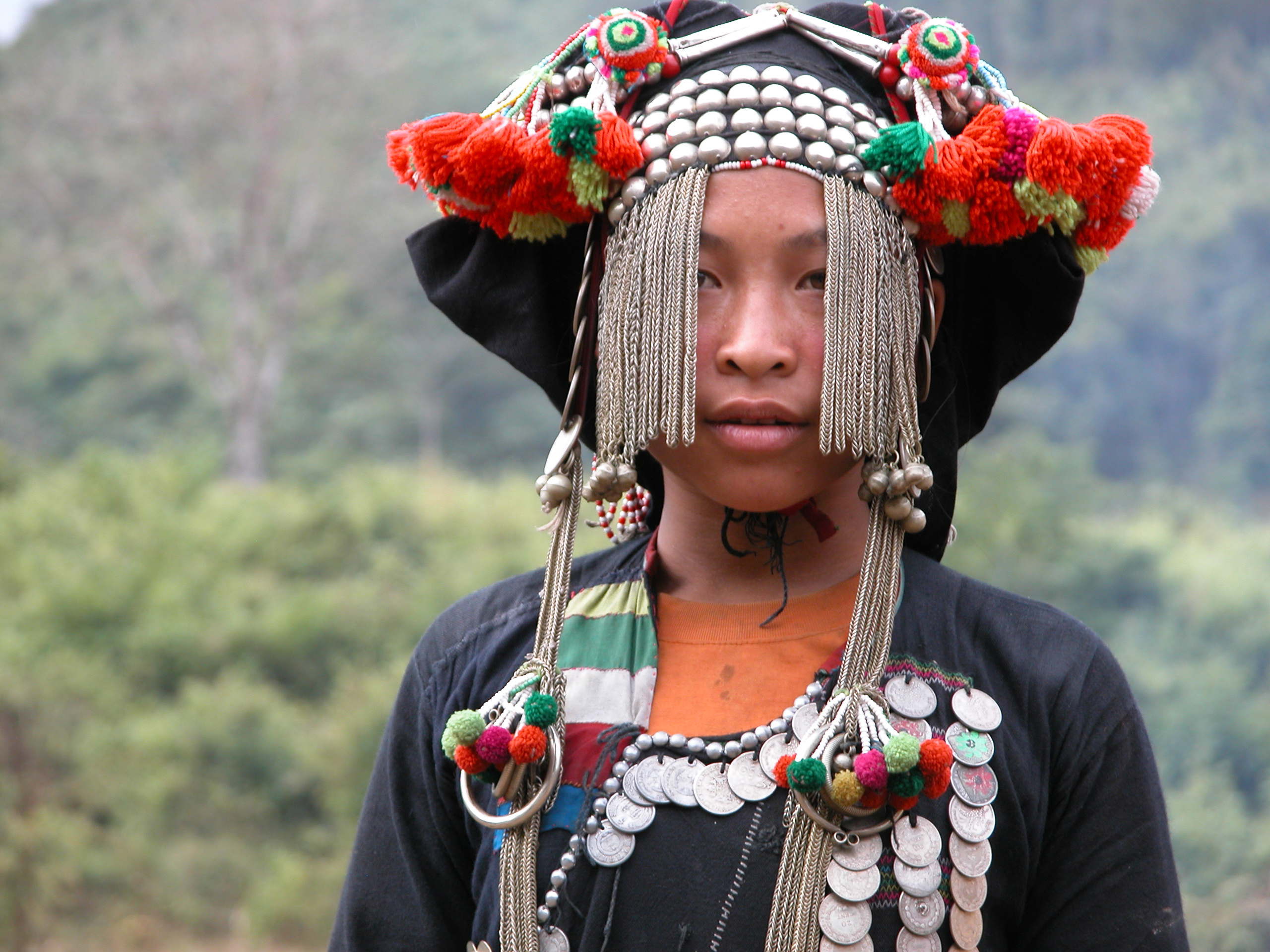
Akha girl in Laos

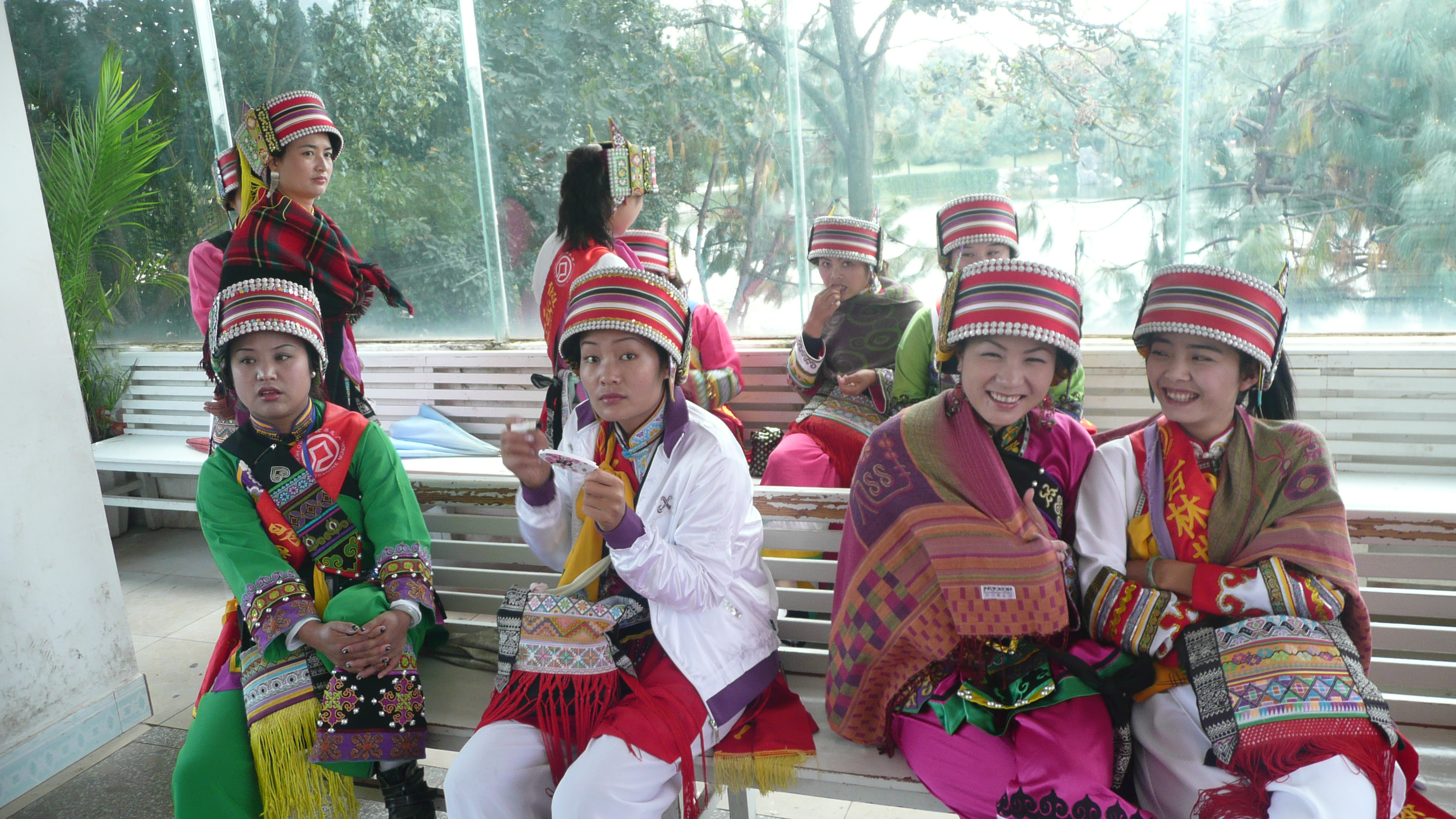
Yi/Nuosu women

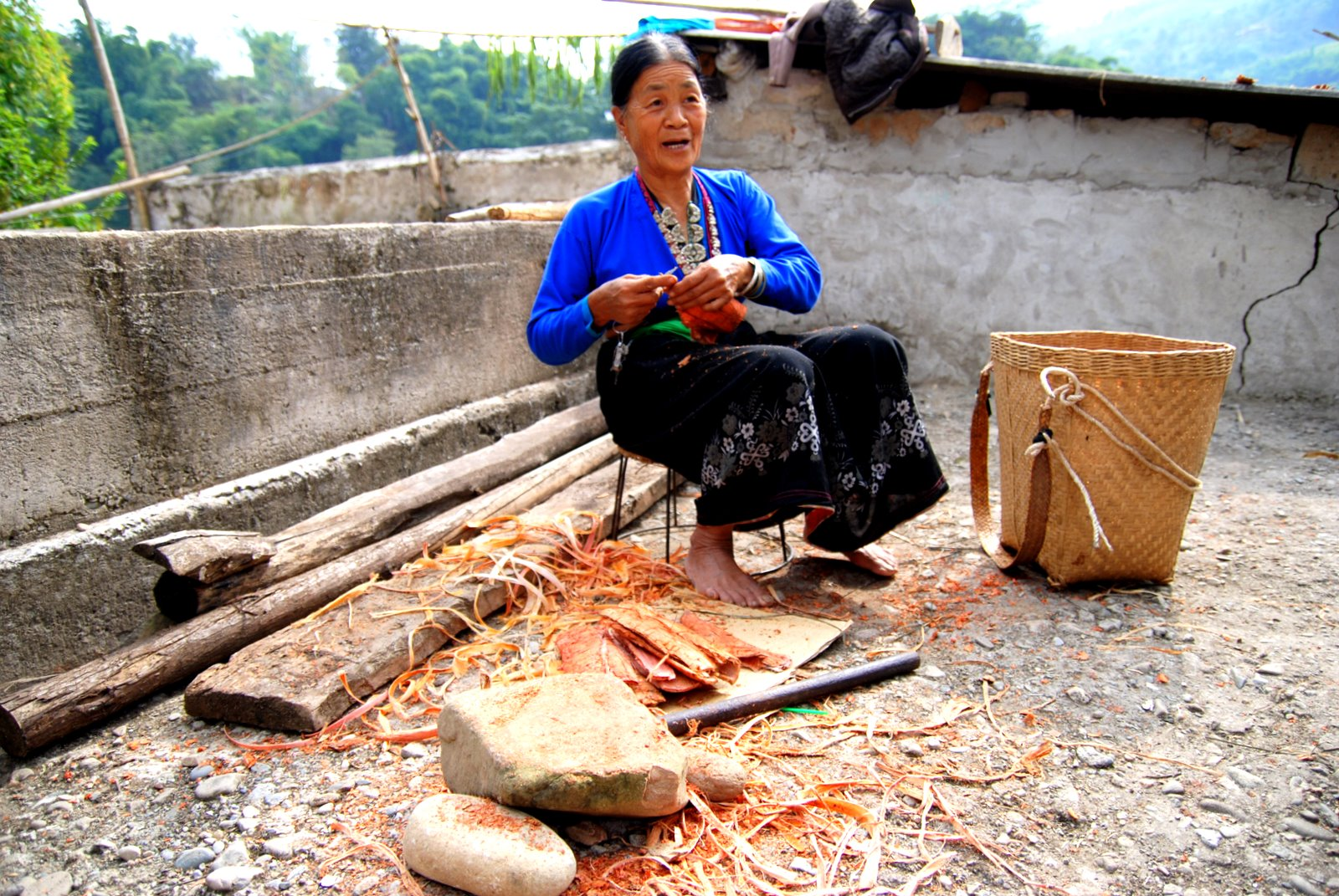
A Tai Dam lady

- Austroasiatic peoples
  - Aslian peoples
    - Senoi (Sengoi/Sng'oi) (a people of the ethnic groups called by the generic word Orang Asli - Original People): in Peninsular Malaysia)
  - Khmer Krom: of Vietnam
  - Khmuic groups:
    - Khmu (Kmm̥uʔ/Kmmúʔ): Thailand and Laos
    - Mlabri: Northern Thailand and Laos
    - Pray: Thailand and Laos
  - Palaungic peoples
    - Wa (Vāx): One of the hill tribes of Myanmar (They are also distributed in Yunnan Province, China in East Asia).
  - Vietic peoples
    - Muong
    - Tho
      - Tuom
      - Liha
      - Phong
    - Thavueng
      - Ahoe (Phon Sung)
      - Ahao
      - Ahlao
    - Chuet
      - Rục
      - Mày
      - Arem
      - Mã Liềng
      - Sách
      - Salang
    - Maleng–Pakatan
      - Bo
      - Arao
      - Atel
      - Atop
      - Kaleun
      - Maleng
      - Pakatan
      - Themarou
    - Kri–Phoóng
      - Krii
      - Phoóng
      - Mlengbrou
- Austronesian peoples
  - Malayo-Polynesian peoples
    - Chamic peoples
      - Cham (Chams/Urang Campa): of Vietnam and Cambodia
    - Moken: in Myanmar, and Thailand
- Hmong–Mien peoples
  - Hmong: subgroups of Thailand, Myanmar, Laos and Vietnam (They are also distributed in China in East Asia).
- Montagnards (Degar): an umbrella term for several Pre-Vietnamese peoples that dwell in the plateaus and mountains of the southern regions of Vietnam
  - Austroasiatic peoples
    - Bahnaric peoples
      - North Bahnaric peoples
        - Sedang, Halang and Kayong: Vietnam
        - H're people: Quảng Ngãi Province, Central Vietnam
      - Central Bahnaric peoples
        - Bahnar: Central Highland provinces of Gia Lai and Kon Tum, as well as the coastal provinces of Bình Định and Phú Yên (Vietnam)
        - Jeh-Tariang people: Kon Tum, Vietnam
      - Southern Bahnaric peoples
        - Mạ people: Central Highlands, Vietnam
        - Mnong: Cambodia and Vietnam
        - Stieng: Cambodia and Vietnam
        - Koho: Di Linh Highland of Vietnam
      - Eastern Bahnaric:
        - Cor people
    - Katuic peoples
      - Katu
        - Katu: Vietnam and Laos
      - West
        - Bru (Bruu): Thailand, Laos, India and Vietnam
        - Ta Oi people: Laos, Vietnam
  - Austronesian peoples
    - Malayo-Polynesian peoples
      - Chamic peoples
        - Highlands Chamic peoples
          - Rade-Jarai
            - Jarai: Central Highlands of Vietnam, as well as in the Northeast Province of Ratanakiri (Cambodia)
            - Rhade: Southern Vietnam
          - Chru–Northern
            - Northern Cham
              - Raglai: in Khánh Hòa Province of South Central Coast, and Ninh Thuận Province in the Southeast region of Vietnam
- Negrito:
  - Mani (Maniq): Far Southern Thailand
  - Semang (a group of several peoples of the ethnic groups called by the generic word Orang Asli - Original People): Peninsular Malaysia
  - Batek: Peninsular Malaysia
- Sino-Tibetan-speaking peoples
  - Karenic peoples
    - Karen (Per Ploan Poe/Ploan/Pwa Ka Nyaw/Kanyaw): an alliance of hill tribes of Myanmar and Thailand
  - Lolo-Burmese peoples
    - Akha a.k.a. Aini or Aini-Akha: One of the hill tribes of Thailand, Laos and Burma (They are also distributed in Yunnan Province, China in East Asia).
    - Lahu (Ladhulsi/Kawzhawd): One of the hill tribes of Thailand, Myanmar and Laos (They are also distributed in Yunnan, China).
    - Lisu: One of the hill tribes of Myanmar and Thailand (They are also distributed in Arunachal Pradesh, India in South Asia and Yunnan and Sichuan, China).
    - Rakhine (Rəkhàin lùmjó), Kaman and Marma: Arakan in Myanmar
    - Yi (Nuosu/Nisu/Sani/Axi/Lolo): a group of several related peoples mainly in Yunnan, China.
  - Tibeto-Burman peoples
    - Intha: Inle Lake of Myanmar
    - Chin peoples: Umbrella term for tribes in or near Chin State, Myanmar
      - Daai
      - Khumi: Chin State and Bangladesh
      - Lai: In and around Hakha, Chin State
      - Mro-Khimi
      - Sumtu
        - Zo peoples: Term for ethnically related groups in Chin State, Mizoram, Manipur and surrounding areas.
          - Zomi: Collective identity within the broader Zo peoples.
          - Zotung: One of the peoples in the Chin Hills.
          - Zou
- Tai peoples: Vietnam, Myanmar, Laos and Thailand (They are also distributed in Yunnan, China).
  - Southwestern Tai peoples
    - Khün (Thai Khün)
    - Phu Thai
    - Tai Dam: Northwest Vietnam, Laos and Thailand (They are also distributed in Yunnan)
    - Tai Lu: Laos, Northern Thailand, Myanmar, and Lai Châu Province in Vietnam (They are also distributed in Xishuangbanna in Yunnan, China).
    - Tai Nüa

==== Maritime Southeast Asia (Malay Archipelago) ====
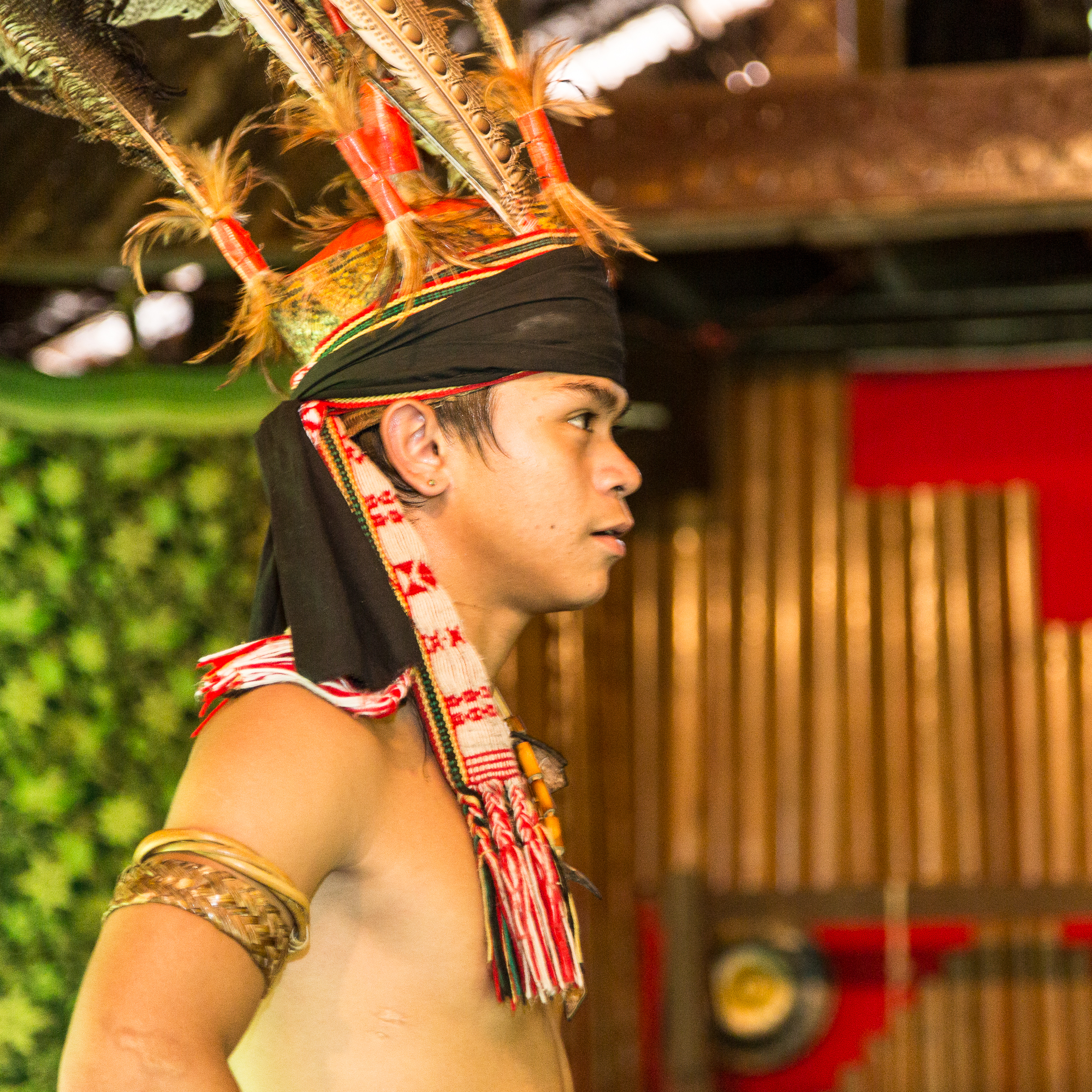
A Murut man (a member of one of the Dayak ethnicities) in Monsopiad Cultural Village, Kg. Kuai Kandazon, Penampang, Sabah, Borneo Island

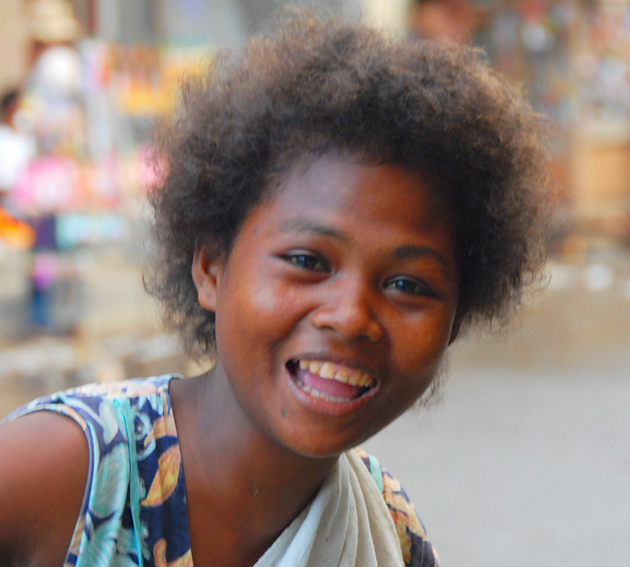
Ati woman, the Philippines, 2007 The Negritos were the earliest inhabitants of Southeast Asia.

- Austronesian peoples
  - Malayo-Polynesian peoples
    - Barito peoples
      - Bajau (Sama/Samah/Samal): Borneo and the Sulu Archipelago (Malaysia, Indonesia, Philippines)
    - Dayak: Borneo, (Malaysia and Indonesia)
    - Northwest Sumatra–Barrier Islands peoples
      - Mentawai peoples
        - Mentawai: Mentawai Islands, Indonesia
        - Sakuddei: Siberut Island and Mentawai Islands, Indonesia
    - Malayic peoples
      - Orang Laut and Orang Seletar: Malaysia and Singapore
      - Proto-Malay (Melayu asli/Melayu purba): Malaysia
    - North Bornean peoples
      - Penan: Sarawak, Malaysia
      - Lun Bawang: Sarawak, Malaysia
    - Philippine peoples
      - Igorot (Ifugao: Ipugao; Benguet: Ibaloi, Kankanaey; Mountain Province: Bontoc; Kalinga: Kiangan; Abra: Itneg; Apayao: Isneg): Cordillera mountains in Luzon in the Philippines
      - Lumad (Katawhang Lumad): Mindanao in the Philippines
      - Mangyan: Mindoro in the Philippines
      - Moro: Mindanao and Sulu archipelago in the Philippines
        - Tausug (Tausūg/Suluk/Sulug)
        - Maguindanao
        - Maranao (Iranon/Iranun)
      - Tribes of Palawan: Palawan, Philippines
- Orang Rimba (Orang Batin Sembilan/Orang Rimba/Anak Dalam/Kubu): Sumatra, Indonesia
- Lubu: Sumatra, Indonesia
- Negrito:
  - Aeta: Luzon, Philippines
  - Ati: Panay, Philippines
  - Batak: Palawan, Philippines

=== Europe ===
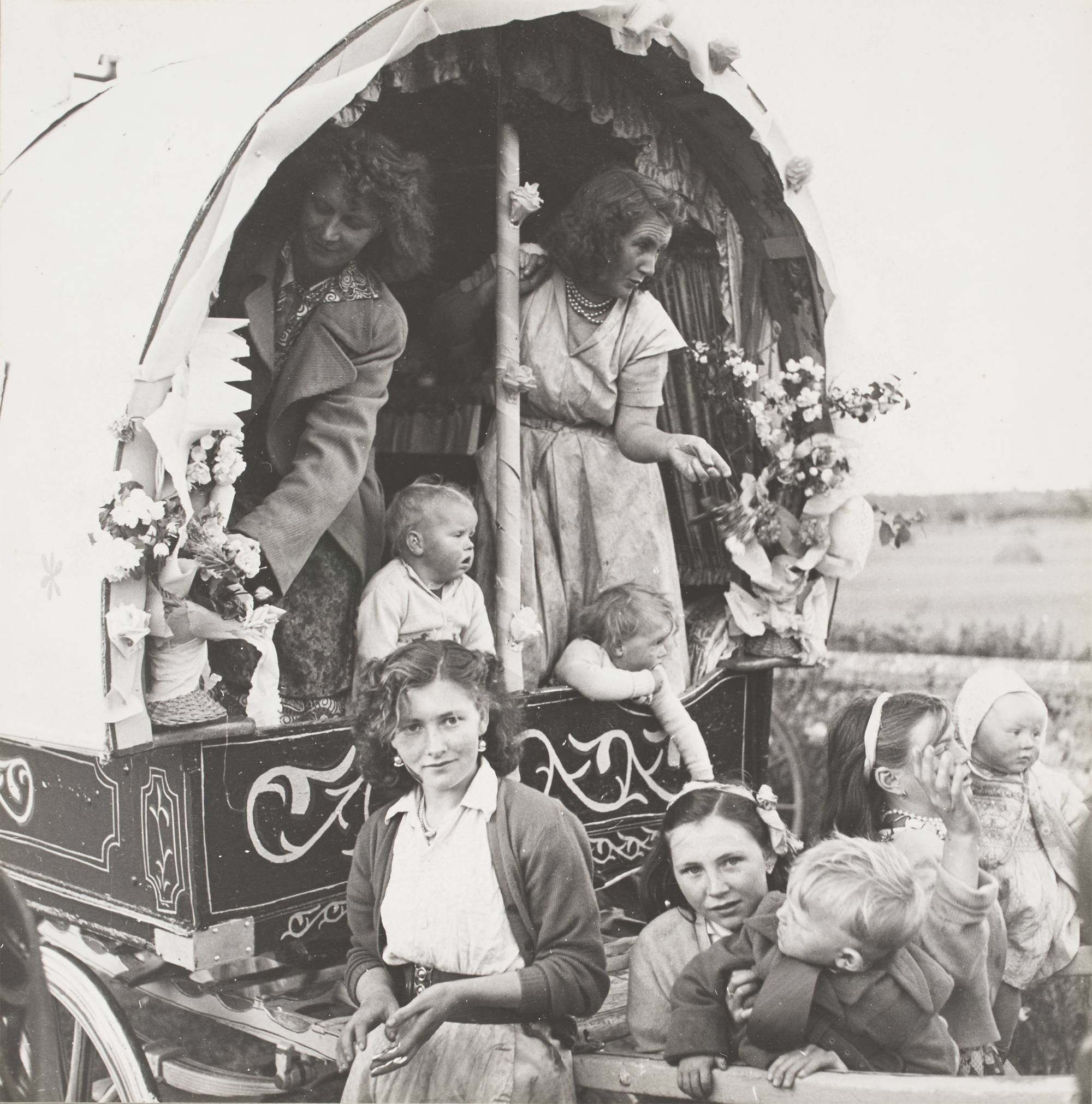
Irish Travellers in Cork

Some sources describe the Sámi as the only recognized indigenous peoples in Europe, with others describing them as the only indigenous people in the European Union. Other groups, particularly in Central, Western and Southern Europe, that might be considered to fit the description of indigenous peoples in the Indigenous and Tribal Peoples Convention, 1989, such as the Sorbs, are generally categorized as national minorities instead.

==== Northern Europe ====
- Sámi of Norway, Sweden, Finland and Russia
- Kvens of Norway.
- Samoyedic peoples of northern Russia
- Vepsians of northwestern Russia

==== Western Europe ====
- Irish Travellers of the island of Ireland

== Americas ==
The Americas consist of the supercontinent comprising North and South America, and associated islands.

List of peoples by geographical and ethnolinguistic grouping:

=== North America ===
North America includes all of the continent and islands east of the Bering Strait and north of the Isthmus of Panama; it includes Greenland, Canada, United States, Mexico, Central American and Caribbean countries. However, a distinction can be made between a broader North America and a narrower Northern America and Middle America due to ethnic and cultural characteristics.

- Indigenous peoples in North America by Country
  - Aboriginal peoples in Canada
    - First Nations
    - Inuit
    - Métis
  - Indigenous peoples in the United States
    - Alaskan Creoles
    - Alaska Natives
  - Indigenous peoples of Mexico
- Indigenous peoples in North America by native cultural regions

==== Arctic ====
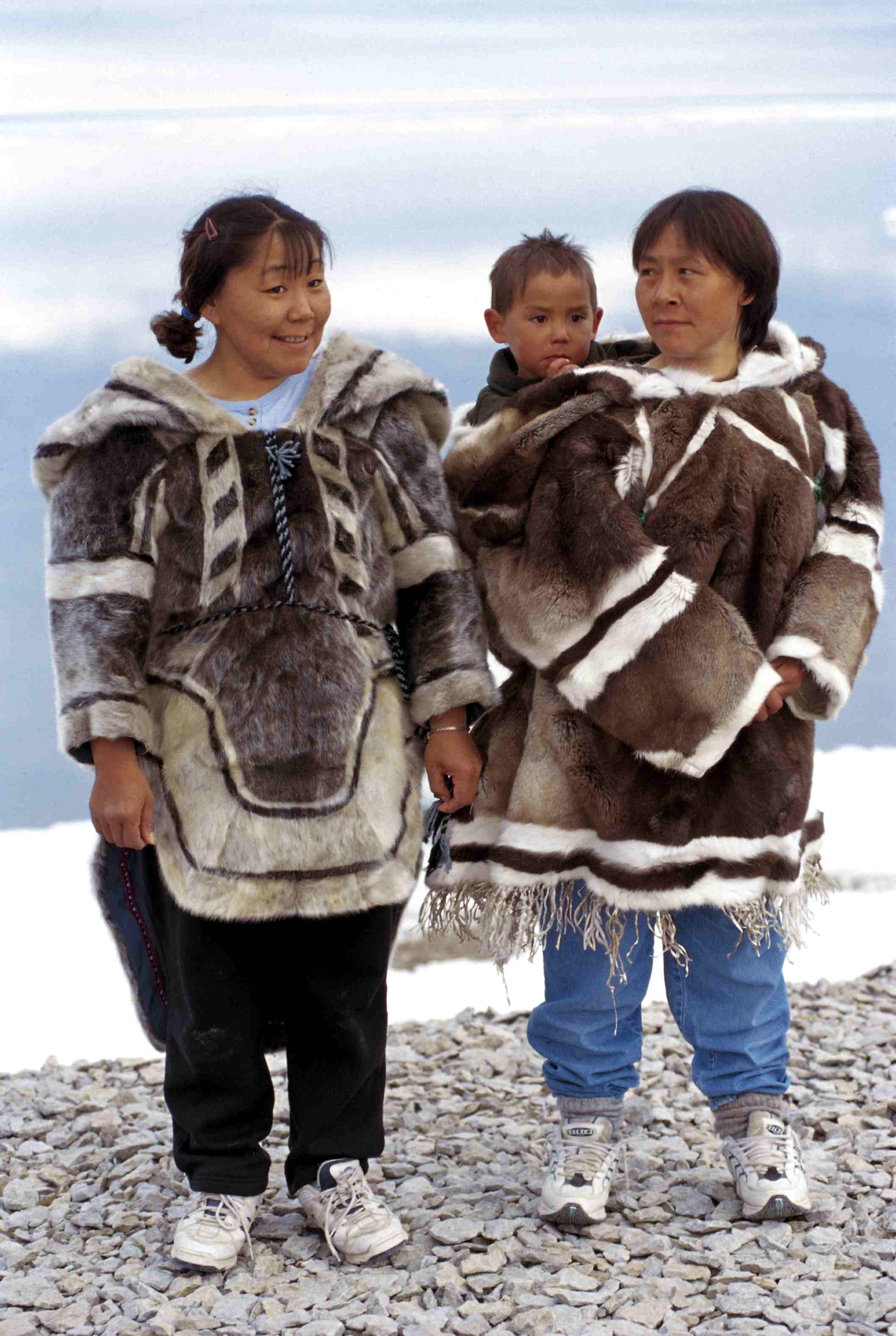
Two Inuit women in traditional amauti (packing parkas)

- Ancient Beringian - Siberia and Alaska
- Eskimo–Aleut
  - Aleut (Unangan/Unangas): Aleutian Islands and Kamchatka Krai
  - Eskimo/Yupit-Inuit
    - Yupik: Alaska, United States
      - Alutiiq (Sugpiat): Alaska, United States
      - Central Alaskan Yup'ik (Yupiat/Yupiit): Alaska, United States
      - Cup'ik (Cupiit): Alaska, United States
      - Cup'ig: Nunivak Island, Alaska, United States
      - Siberian Yupik of St. Lawrence Island, Alaska, United States.
    - Inuit: Canadian Arctic - Northwest Territories, Nunavik, Nunatsiavut, Nunavut; Greenland; Alaska, United States
      - Greenlandic Inuit: Greenland
        - Inughuit: North Greenland
        - Kalaallit: West Greenland
        - Tunumiit: East Greenland
      - Inupiat: Arctic Alaska, North Slope and boroughs and the Bering Strait
        - Nunamiut: Interior Alaska.
      - Inuit: Canadian Arctic
        - Eastern Canadian Inuit: East Canadian Arctic, East Nunavut, Nunavik, Nunatsiavut
        - Western Canadian Inuit (Inuvialuit): West Canadian Arctic, Inuvialuit Settlement Region, Arctic coast of Northwest Territories, West Nunavut
- Métis: a mixed First Nations (from several peoples) and European (from several peoples) people of Canada.

==== Subarctic ====
- Na-Dené peoples
  - Athabaskan peoples
    - Northern Athabaskan peoples
      - Dene of Yukon, British Columbia, Manitoba, Northwest Territory, and Alberta, Canada.
      - Alaskan Athabaskans
        - Southern Alaskan peoples
          - Ahtna
          - Ingalik
        - Koyukon of Interior Alaska.
        - Kutchin of Interior Alaska and the Yukon.
        - Tanana Athabaskans.
        - Kolchan of Interior Alaska.
        - Deg Hit'an of Interior Alaska.
        - Dena'ina of Interior Alaska.
        - Holikachuk
        - Hän of Yukon, Canada, and Alaska, United States.
- Métis: a mixed First Nations (primarily Cree) and European (primarily French) people of Canada.
- Algonquians
  - Cree of Montana, United States, and Manitoba, Alberta, and Saskatchewan, Canada.
  - Innu of Northeastern Quebec, and Western Labrador, Canada.
  - Annishinabe of Quebec, Ontario, and Manitoba, Canada, as well as Kansas, Michigan, Minnesota, Oklahoma, and Wisconsin, United States.
    - Algonquin of Quebec, and Ontario, Canada.
  - Beothuk of Newfoundland, Canada.

==== Pacific Northwest Coast ====
- Makah of Washington, United States.
- Quinault of Washington, United States.
- Nootka of British Columbia, Canada.
- Kwakiutl of British Columbia, Canada.
- Eyak of Alaska, United States.
- Haida of British Columbia, Canada, and Alaska, United States.
- Tlingit of Alaska, United States.
- Tshimshian of British Columbia, Canada, and Alaska, United States.

==== Northwest Plateau-Great Basin-California ====
===== Great Basin =====
- Ute of Utah, United States.
- Shoshone of Colorado, Wyoming, Nevada, and Utah, United States.
  - Mono of California, United States.
  - Bannock of Idaho, United States.
  - Western Shoshone of Nevada, United States.
  - Timbisha of Nevada, United States.
- Washoe of Nevada, United States.
- Paiute of Colorado, California, Nevada, and Utah, United States.
  - Northern Paiute.
  - Southern Paiute.
- Pais of Colorado, Arizona, and New Mexico, United States, as well as Baja California, Mexico.
  - Hualapai of Arizona, United States.
  - Walapai of Arizona and Colorado, United States.

===== California =====
- Yuman-Cochimi peoples
  - Cochimí people: Baja California, Mexico
  - Core Yuman peoples
    - Kiliwa (K'olew): Baja California, Mexico
    - Paipai (Akwa'ala/Yakakwal): Baja California, Mexico
    - Delta-Californian peoples
      - Cocopa (Cocopah/Xawiƚƚ Kwñchawaay): Baja California, Mexico, and Arizona, United States.
      - Kumeyaay (Ipai-Tipai/MuttTipi): Baja California, Mexico, and California, United States.
- Miwok of California, United States.
- Maidu of California, United States.
- Wintu of California, United States.
- Chumash of California, United States.
- Tongva of California, United States.
- Modoc of California, and Oregon, United States.
- Athabaskans
  - Achumawi of California, and Oregon, United States.
  - Hupa of California and Oregon, United States.
- Cahuilla of California, United States.
- Mojave of California, and Nevada, United States.
- Uto-Aztecans
  - Mono of California, and Nevada, United States.
  - Northern Paiute of California and Nevada, United States.
  - Ohlone of California, United States.
- Karok of California, United States.

==== Great Plains ====
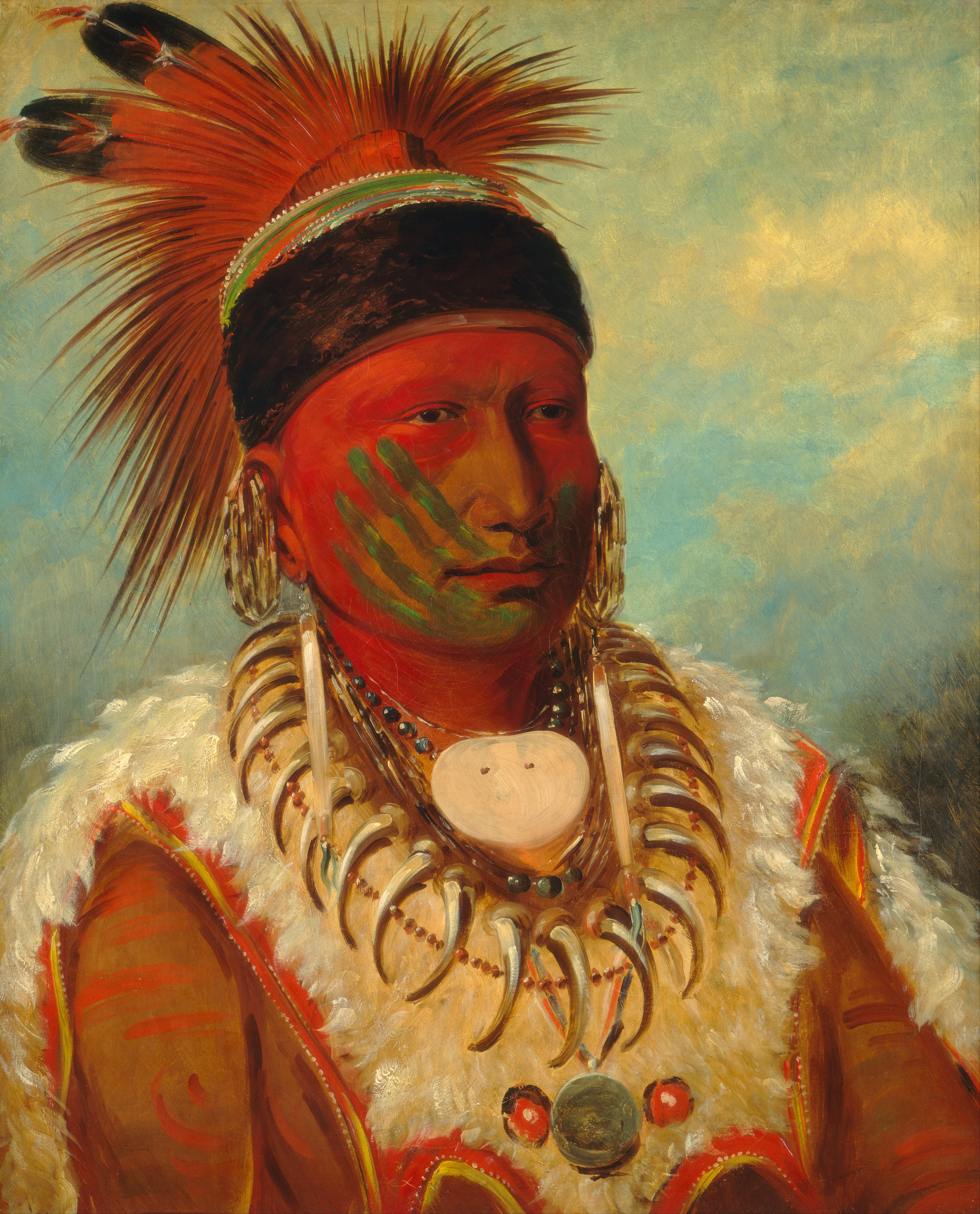
White Cloud, Chief of the Iowa, by George Catlin, 1845

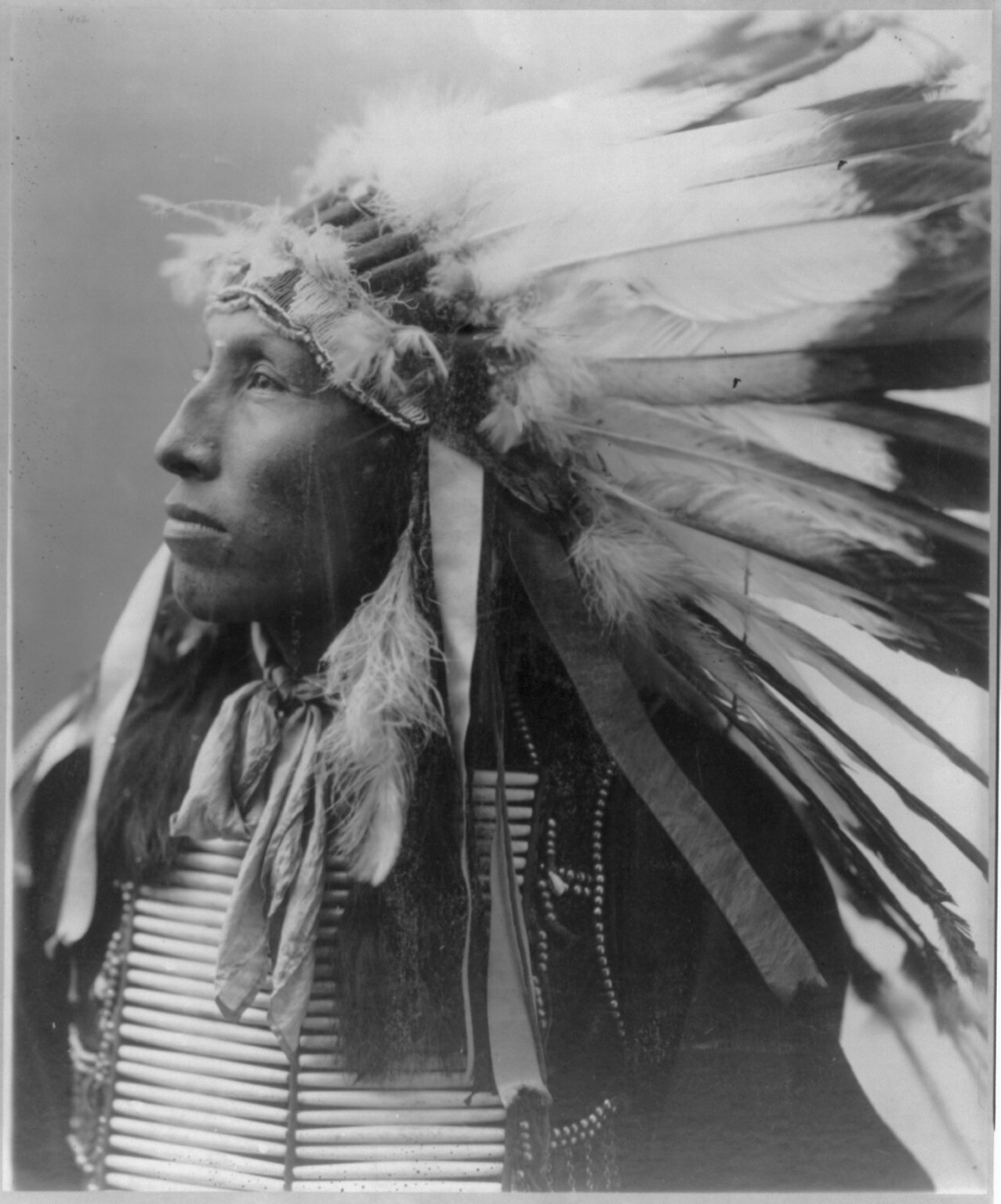
Sioux man, 1899

- Comanche, Oklahoma, United States
- Osage, Oklahoma, United States
- Sioux of North Dakota, South Dakota, and Minnesota, United States, as well as Saskatchewan, and Alberta, Canada
  - Lakota of South Dakota, North Dakota, United States
  - Dakota people, Minnesota, Nebraska, South Dakota, North Dakota, United States, and Saskatchewan, Canada
- Kiowa, Oklahoma
  - Plains Apache, Oklahoma
- Crow, Montana
- Omaha, Nebraska
- Blackfoot of Montana, United States, Alberta, Canada, and Saskatchewan, Canada.

==== Eastern Woodlands ====
===== Northeastern Woodlands =====
- Iroquoian peoples
  - Haudenosaunee of New York, Wisconsin, and Oklahoma, United States, as well as Quebec and Ontario, Canada.
    - Mohawk of Quebec, Canada, and New York, United States
    - Seneca of New York, and Oklahoma, United States, as well as Ontario, Canada
    - Cayuga of Oklahoma, and New York, United States, as well as Ontario, Canada
    - Oneida of Wisconsin and New York, United States, as well as Ontario, Canada
    - Tuscarora of New York, United States, and Ontario, Canada.
    - Onondaga of New York, United States, and Ontario, Canada
  - Wendat of Quebec and Ontario, Canada
  - Wyandot of Kansas, Michigan, and Oklahoma, United States, as well as Ontario, Canada
  - Nation du chat of Upstate New York, Ohio, and Northwest Pennsylvania, United States
  - Conestoga (Susquehannock) of Pennsylvania, West Virginia, New York, and Maryland (United States)
  - St. Lawrence Iroquoians: St. Lawrence River, Quebec, Canada, and New York, United States
  - Monongahela: Pennsylvania, West Virginia, and Ohio, United States
  - Nottoway of Virginia, United States
  - Westo of Virginia and South Carolina, United States
- Algic peoples
  - Algonquian peoples
    - Chowanoke of North Carolina
    - Carolina Algonquian
      - Roanoke of North Carolina
        - Croatan of North Carolina
    - Powhatan Confederacy of Virginia
      - Pamunkey of Virginia, United States
      - Powhatan people of Virginia, United States
    - Wampanoag of Massachusetts
    - Wabanaki of Maine, United States, and New Brunswick and Newfoundland, Canada
      - Abenaki of Maine and Quebec
      - Penobscot of Maine
      - Miqmac of Maine, New Brunswick, and Newfoundland
      - Passamaquoddy of Maine, United States, and New Brunswick, Canada.
      - Maliseet of New Brunswick and Quebec
    - Shawnee of the Ohio River Valley, now Oklahoma
    - Central Algonquian peoples
      - Kikapú (Kiikaapoa/Kiikaapoi): Indigenous peoples from southeast Michigan, United States, also in Coahuila, Mexico
      - Peoria (Illiniwek)
      - Annishinabe
        - Ojibwe of Minnesota, North Dakota, and Michigan, United States, as well as Ontario, Canada
        - Potawatomi of Michigan, Indiana, Kansas, Oklahoma, United States, as well as Ontario, Canada
        - Odawa of Michigan and Oklahoma, United States, as well as Ontario, Canada.
      - Cree of Alberta, Manitoba, Ontario, Saskatchewan, and the Northwest Territories, Canada, as well as Montana, United States.

===== Southeastern Woodlands =====
- Cherokee of North Carolina and Oklahoma
- Natchez of Mississippi and Louisiana, descendants in Oklahoma
- Muskogeans
  - Muscogee of Alabama and Oklahoma
  - Choctaw of Louisiana, Mississippi, and Oklahoma
  - Chickasaw of Oklahoma
- Indigenous peoples of Florida
  - Indigenous people of the Everglades region
    - Calusa of South Florida
    - Tequesta of South Florida
  - Timucua of Northern Florida and Southern Georgia.
  - Apalachee of the Florida Panhandle and Alabama.
  - Seminole of Oklahoma, and Florida
- Siouans
  - Ho-Chunk of Wisconsin and Michigan
  - Catawba of South Carolina
  - Pee Dee of South Carolina
- Caddoans
  - Caddo of Oklahoma
  - Pawnee of Oklahoma, Nebraska and Kansas, United States.
  - Southern Plains villagers of Western Oklahoma, Texas, Kansas, and Southeastern Colorado
  - Arikara of North Dakota, United States
  - Hidatsa of North Dakota, United States
  - Wichita of Oklahoma, United States.

==== Southwest ====
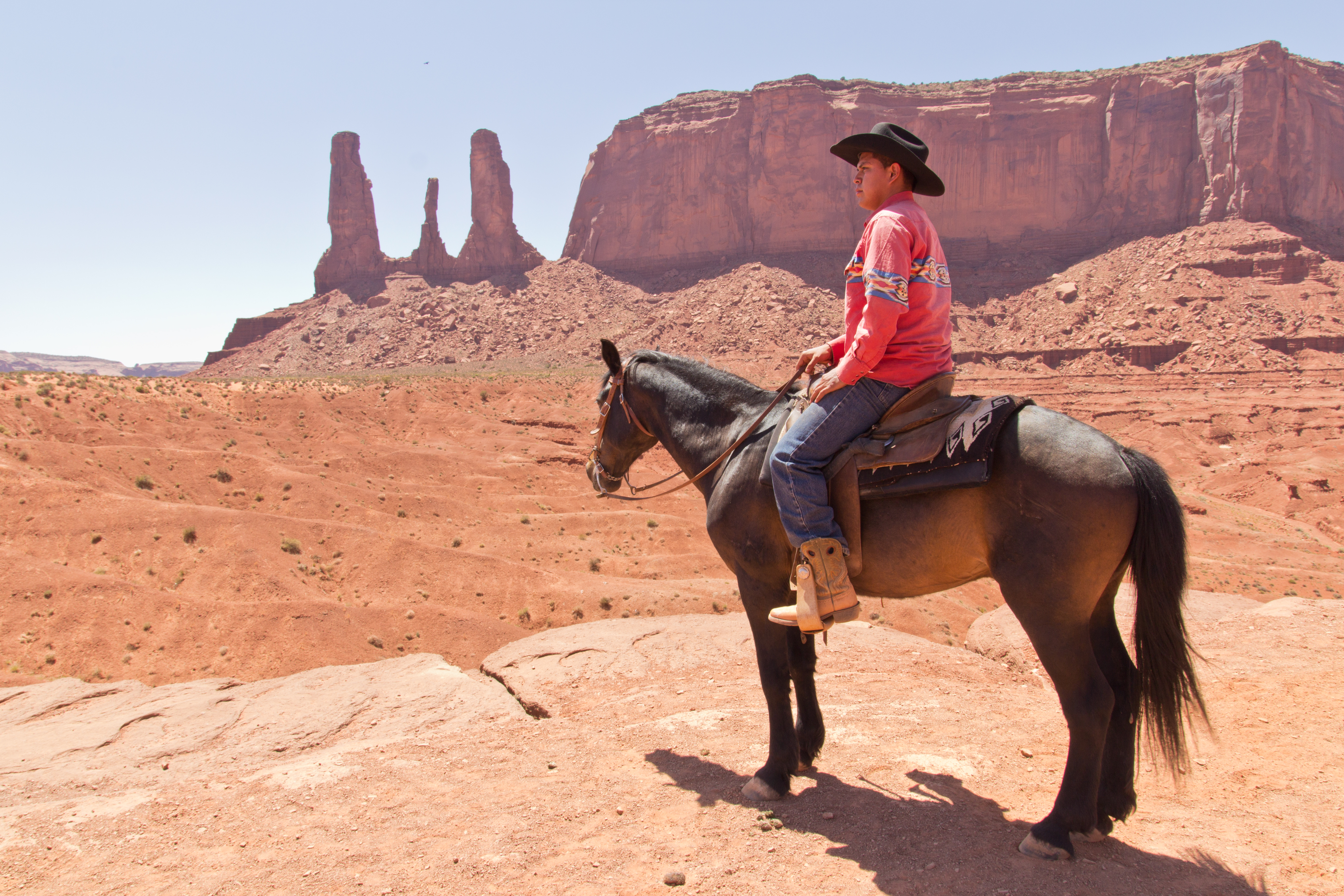
Navajo man in Monument Valley, Utah

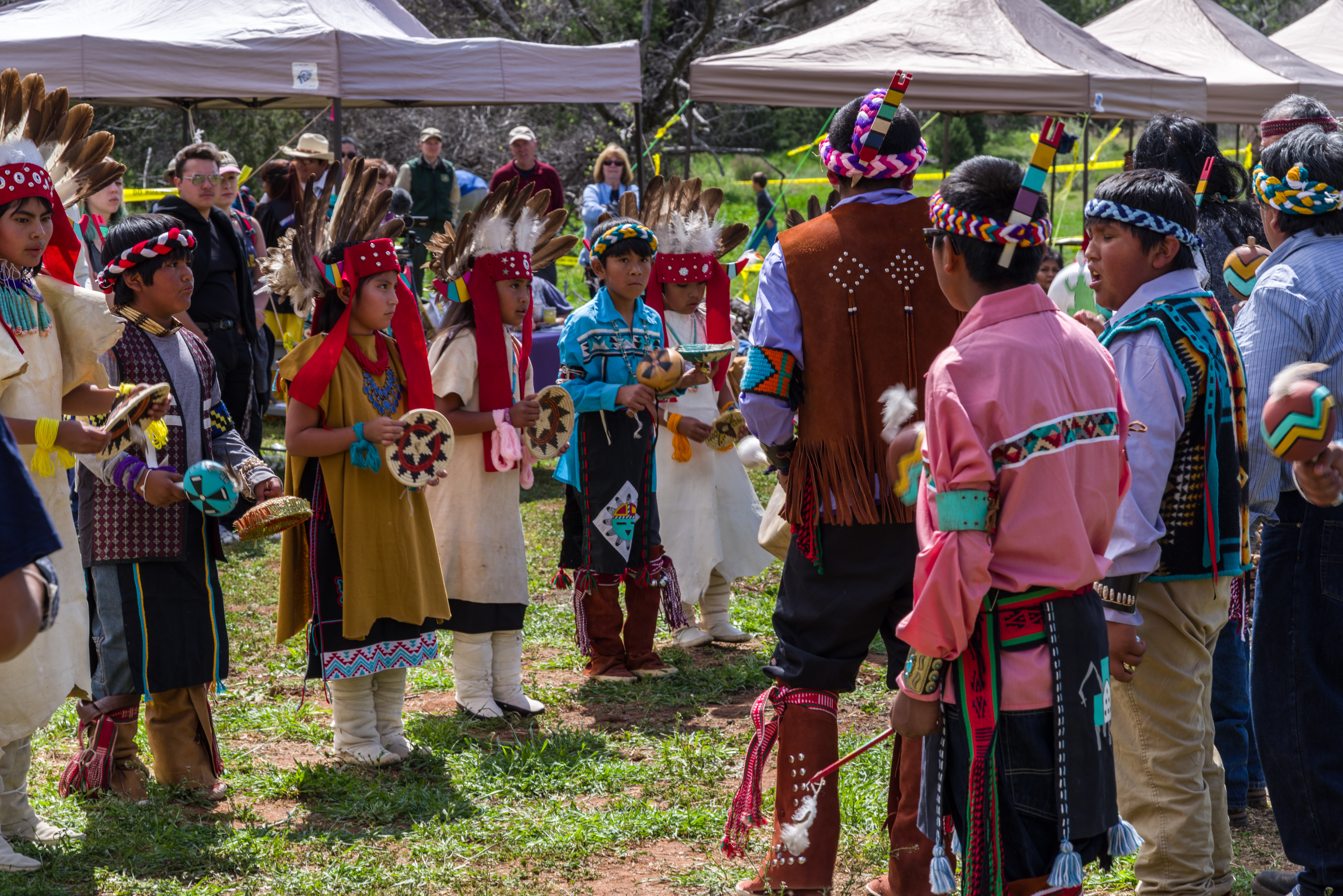
Hopi dancers in 2017

- Uto-Aztecan peoples
  - Aztecan (Nahuan) peoples
    - Mexicanero (Mēxihcah): Durango, Mexico
  - Cáhitan peoples
    - Yaqui (Hiaki/Yoeme): Sonora, Mexico, and Arizona, United States.
    - Mayo (Yoreme): Sonora, Mexico
  - Tarahumaran peoples
    - Guarijío: Sonora, Mexico
    - Tarahumara (Rarámuri-Omugí): Chihuahua and Durango, Mexico
  - Tepiman peoples
    - Pima Bajo: Chihuahua, Mexico
    - Tepehuán (O'dam/Audam/Ódami): Chihuahua and Durango, Mexico
- Seri (Comcaac): Sonora, Mexico
- Puebloan peoples: Colorado, New Mexico, Arizona, Utah, and Texas, United States
  - Hopi of Arizona, United States.
  - Zuni of Arizona, United States.
  - Ancestral Pueblo peoples of Arizona, New Mexico, Colorado, and Utah, United States.
  - Tiwa of New Mexico, United States.
  - Mogolon of New Mexico, Arizona, United States, and Sonora, Mexico
  - Hohokam of Southern Arizona, United States
- Southern Athabascans
  - Apache of Chihuahua, Coahuilla, and Sonora, Mexico, as well as Arizona, New Mexico, Oklahoma, and Texas, United States.
    - Chiricahua of Southern New Mexico, Northern Mexico, Southeast Arizona, and Oklahoma
    - Jicarilla Apache of New Mexico
    - Lipan Apache of New Mexico
    - Plains Apache of Oklahoma
    - Mescalero of New Mexico
    - Western Apache of Western Arizona
  - Navajo of Arizona and New Mexico, the Four Corners region
- O'odham of Sonora, Mexico, and Arizona, United States
  - Akimel O'odham of Arizona, United States
  - Tohono O'odham of far Northern Sonora, Mexico, and Southern Arizona
- Yavapai, Arizona

==== Mesoamerica ====
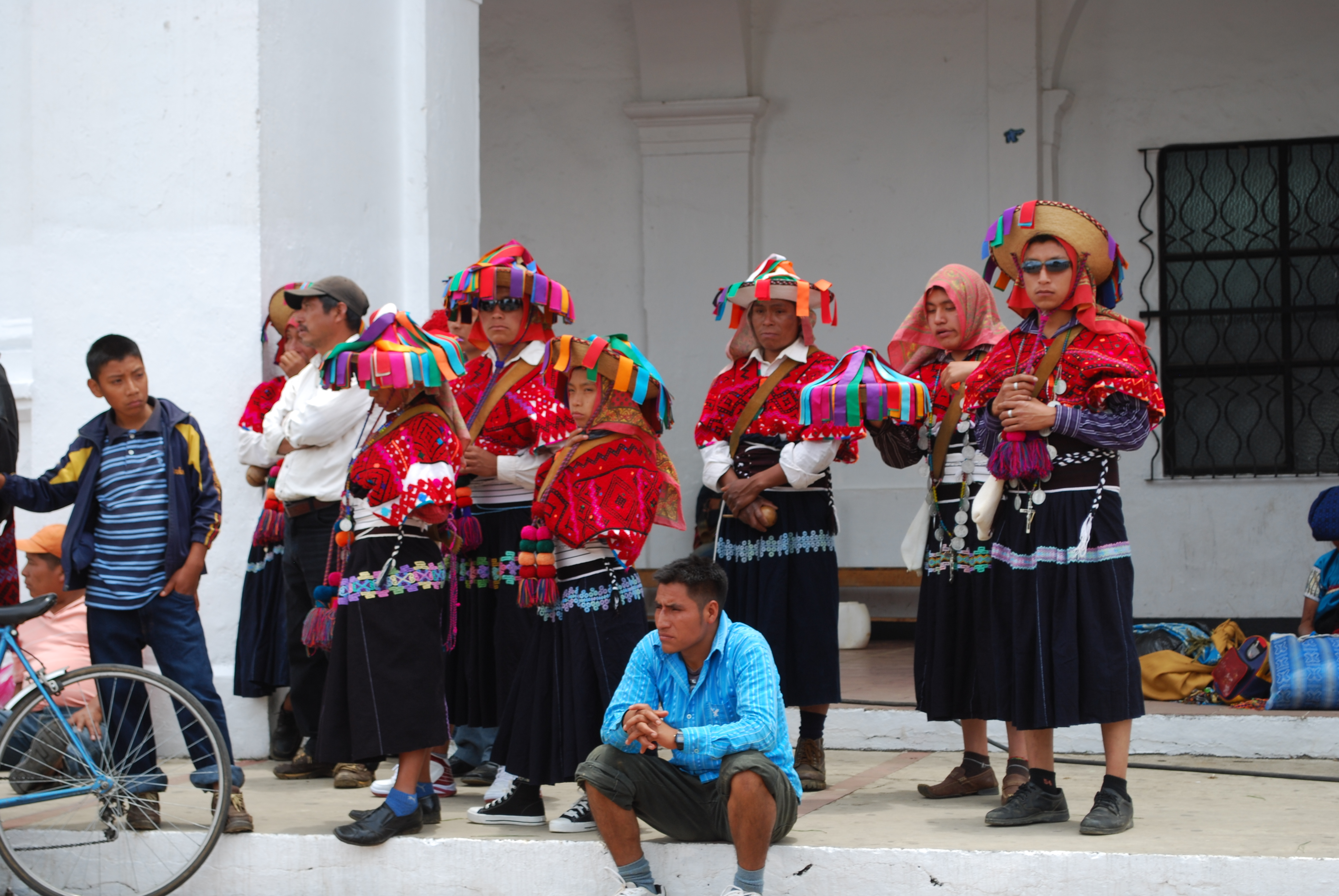
Tzeltal dancers waiting to perform, San Cristobal

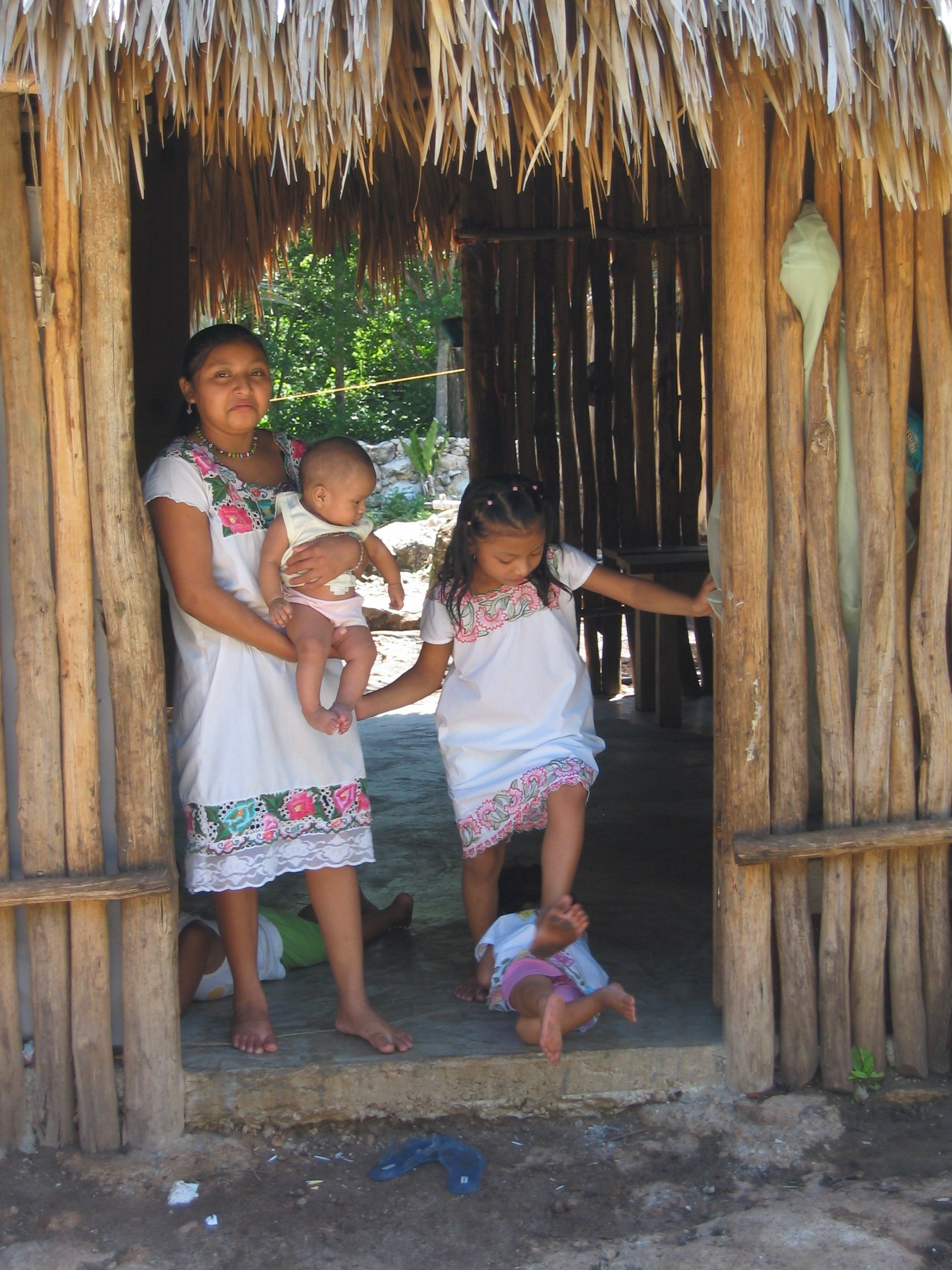
Mayan family from Yucatán

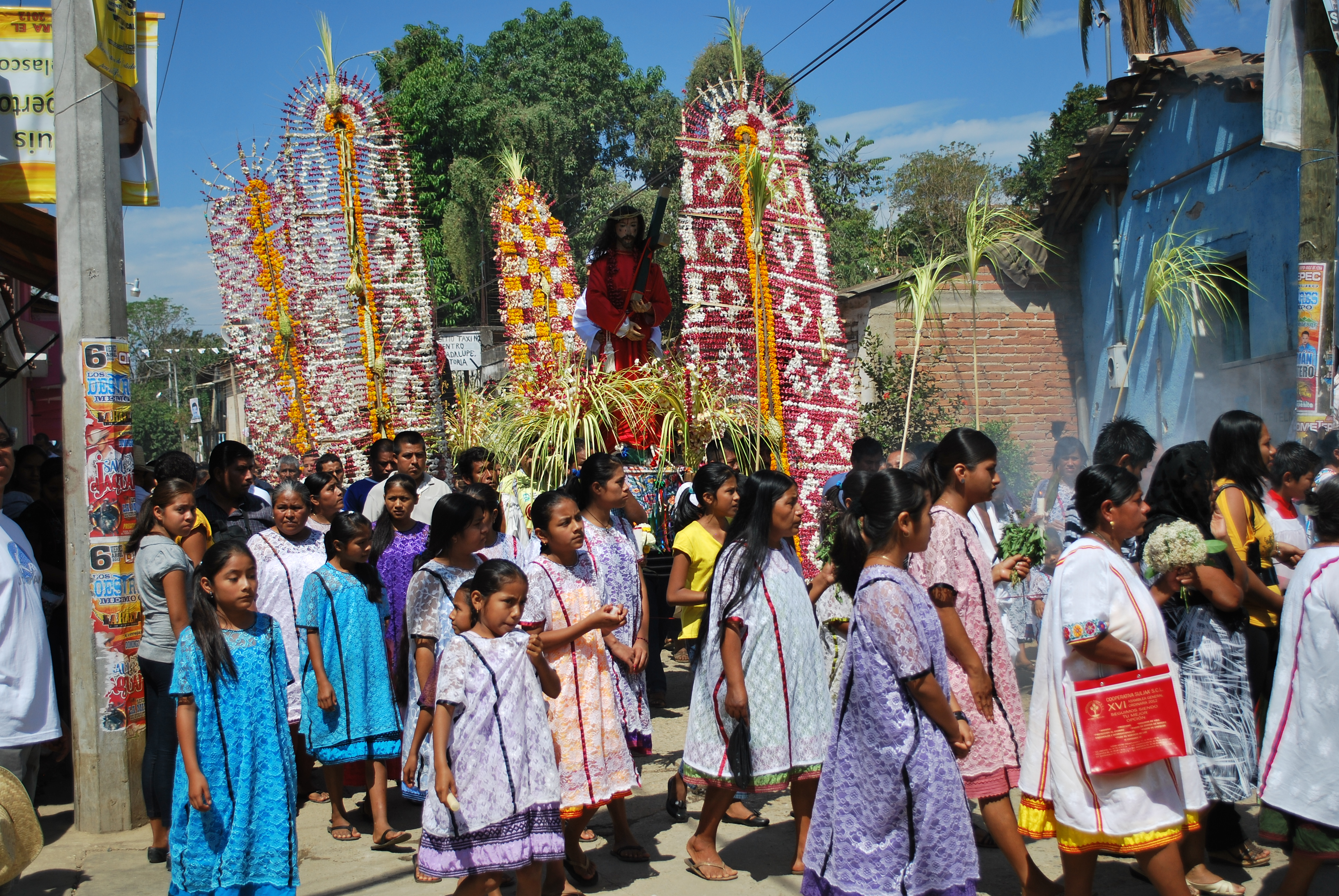
Amuzgos in traditional dress

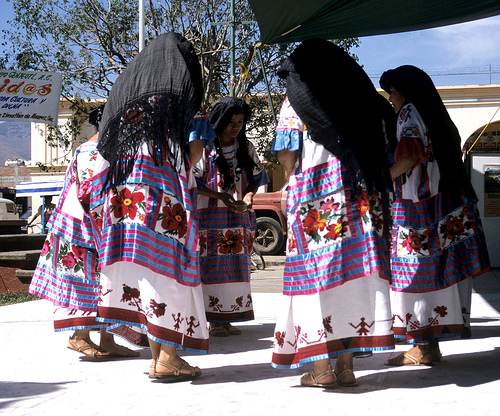
Mazatec girls performing a dance in Huautla de Jimenez

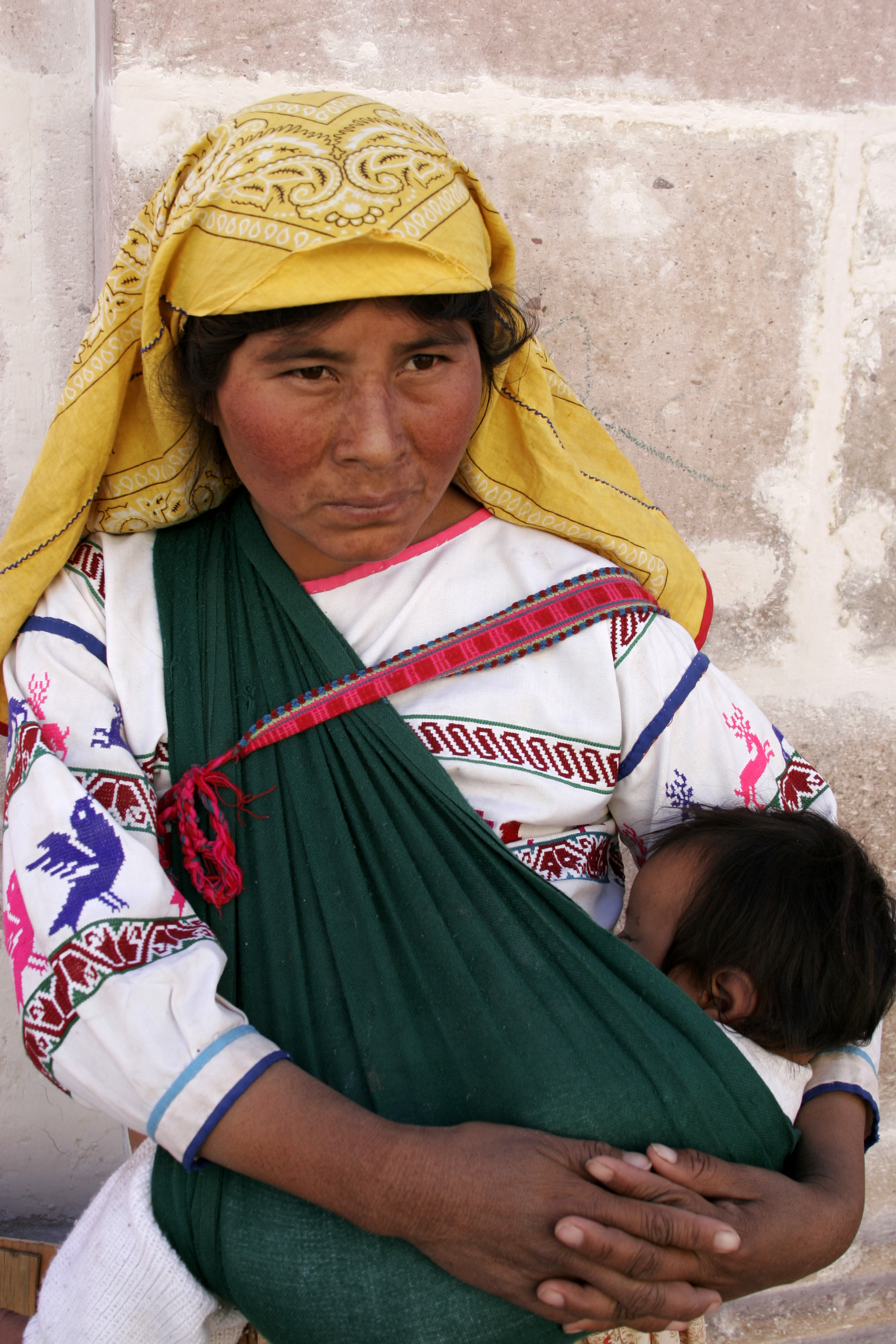
Huichol woman and child

- Huave (Ikoots/Kunajts): Oaxaca, Mexico
- Maya peoples
  - Huastec (Téenek/Te' Inik): San Luis Potosí, Mexico
- Mixe-Zoquean peoples
  - Mixe (Ayüükjä'äy): Oaxaca, Mexico
  - Zoque: Oaxaca and Chiapas Mexico
- Oto-Manguean peoples
  - Amuzgo (Tzjon Non/Tzo'tyio/Ñ'anncue): Oaxaca, Mexico
  - Chinantec: Oaxaca, Mexico
  - Mixtecan
    - Cuicatec: Oaxaca, Mexico
    - Mixtec (Ñuù Savi/Nayívi Savi/Ñuù Davi/Nayivi Davi): Oaxaca, Mexico
    - Trique: Oaxaca, Mexico
  - Oto-Pamean peoples
    - Chichimeca Jonaz (Úza): San Luis Potosí, Mexico
    - Matlatzinca: Mexico (state), Mexico
    - Mazahua (Tetjo Ñaa Jñatjo): Mexico (state), Mexico
    - Otomi (Hñähñu/Hñähño/Ñuhu/Ñhato/Ñuhmu): Central Mexico
    - Pame (Xi'úi): San Luis Potosí, Mexico
  - Popolocan peoples
    - Chocho (Ngiwa): Oaxaca, Mexico
    - Ixcatec: Oaxaca, Mexico
    - Popoloca: Oaxaca, and Puebla, Mexico
    - Mazatec (Ha Shuta Enima): Puebla and Oaxaca, Mexico
  - Tlapanec (Me'phaa): Guerrero, Mexico
  - Zapotecan peoples
    - Chatino (Kitse Cha'tño): Oaxaca, Mexico
    - Zapotec (Be'ena'a/Didxažon): Oaxaca, Mexico
- Tarascan (P'urhépecha): Michoacán, Mexico
- Tequistlatecan/Chontal de Oaxaca: Oaxaca, Mexico
- Totonacan peoples
  - Totonac (Tutunacu): Veracruz and Puebla, Mexico
- Uto-Aztecan peoples
  - Aztecan peoples
    - Nahua (Nāhuatlācah): Mexico
  - Corachol peoples
    - Cora (Náayarite): Jalisco and Nayarit, Mexico
    - Huichol (Wixáritari/Wixárita): Jalisco and Nayarit, Mexico

=== Central America ===
Central America is generally defined as a subregion in North America located between the Isthmus of Tehuantepec and the Darién Gap.

- Indigenous peoples in Central America by country:
  - Indigenous peoples of Costa Rica
  - Indigenous peoples of Panama

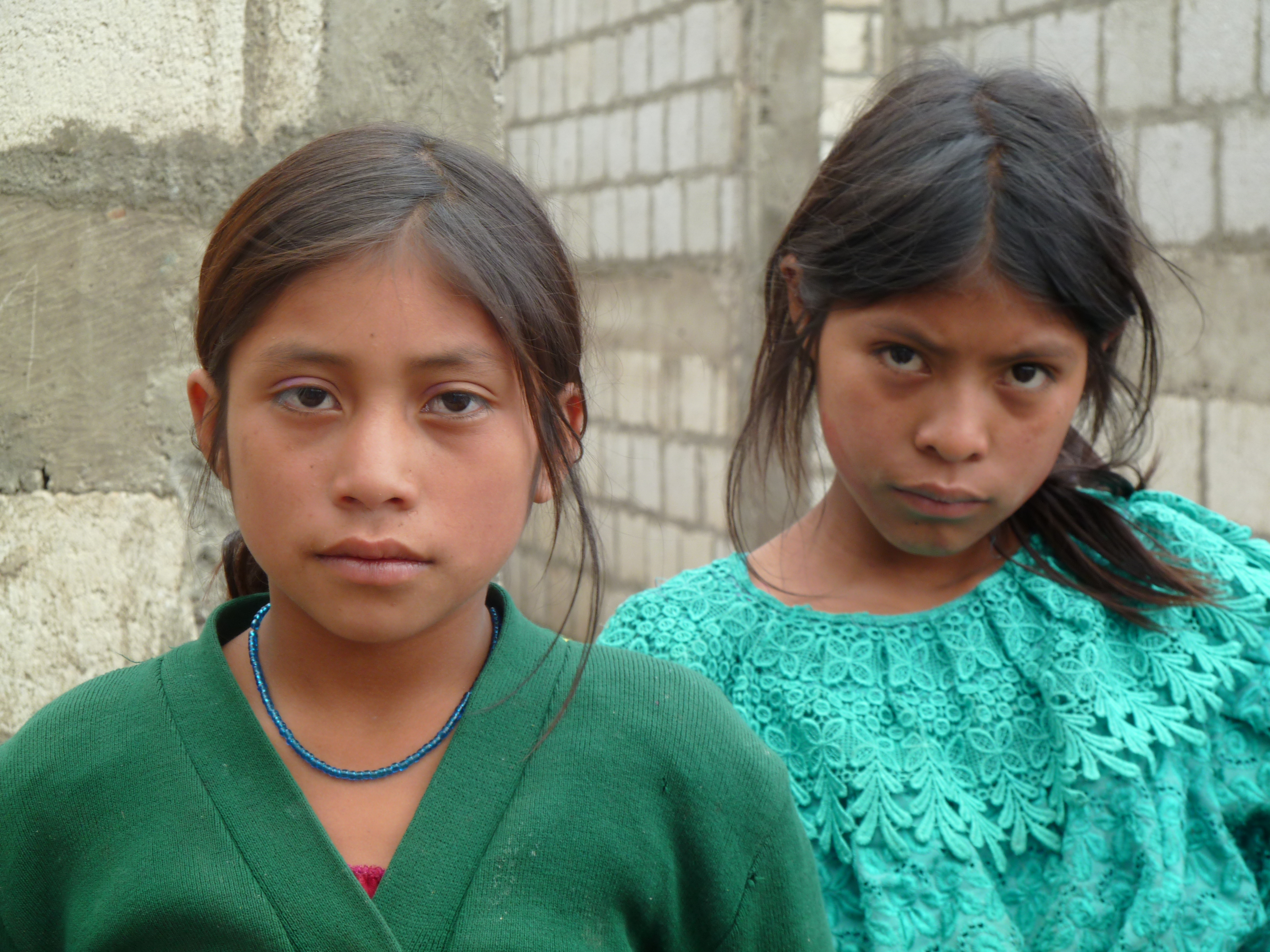
Mam people

==== Mesoamerica ====
- Maya peoples
  - Ch'olan peoples
    - Ch'ol: Chiapas, Mexico
    - Chontal Maya (Yokot'anob/Yokot'an): Tabasco, Mexico
    - Tzeltal (Winik Atel/Batzilʼop): Chiapas, Mexico
    - Tzotzil (Bats'ik'op/Sotz'leb): Chiapas, Mexico
    - Ch'orti': El Salvador
  - Yucatecan peoples
    - Lacandón (Hach Winik): Chiapas, Mexico
    - Yucatec Maya (Maya proper) (Màaya): Yucatán, Quintana Roo and Campeche, Mexico
    - Itza: Guatemala
    - Mopan: Guatemala and Belize
- Lenca: Honduras and El Salvador
- Mamean peoples
  - Ixil: Guatemala
  - Mam: Guatemala
- Q'anjobalan peoples
  - Chuj: Guatemala
  - Jakaltek: Guatemala – also called Poptí
  - Q'anjob'al: Guatemala
  - Tojolabal: Guatemala
- Qichean peoples
  - Achi': Guatemala
  - Kaqchikel: Guatemala
  - K'iche': Guatemala
  - Poqomchi': Guatemala
  - Poqomam: Guatemala
  - Q'eqchi': Guatemala
  - Tz'utujil: Guatemala
- Oto-Manguean peoples
  - Manguean
    - Chorotega (Mangue/Mankeme): Honduras, Nicaragua, and Costa Rica
- Xinca (Xinka): Guatemala

==== Isthmo-Colombian Area ====
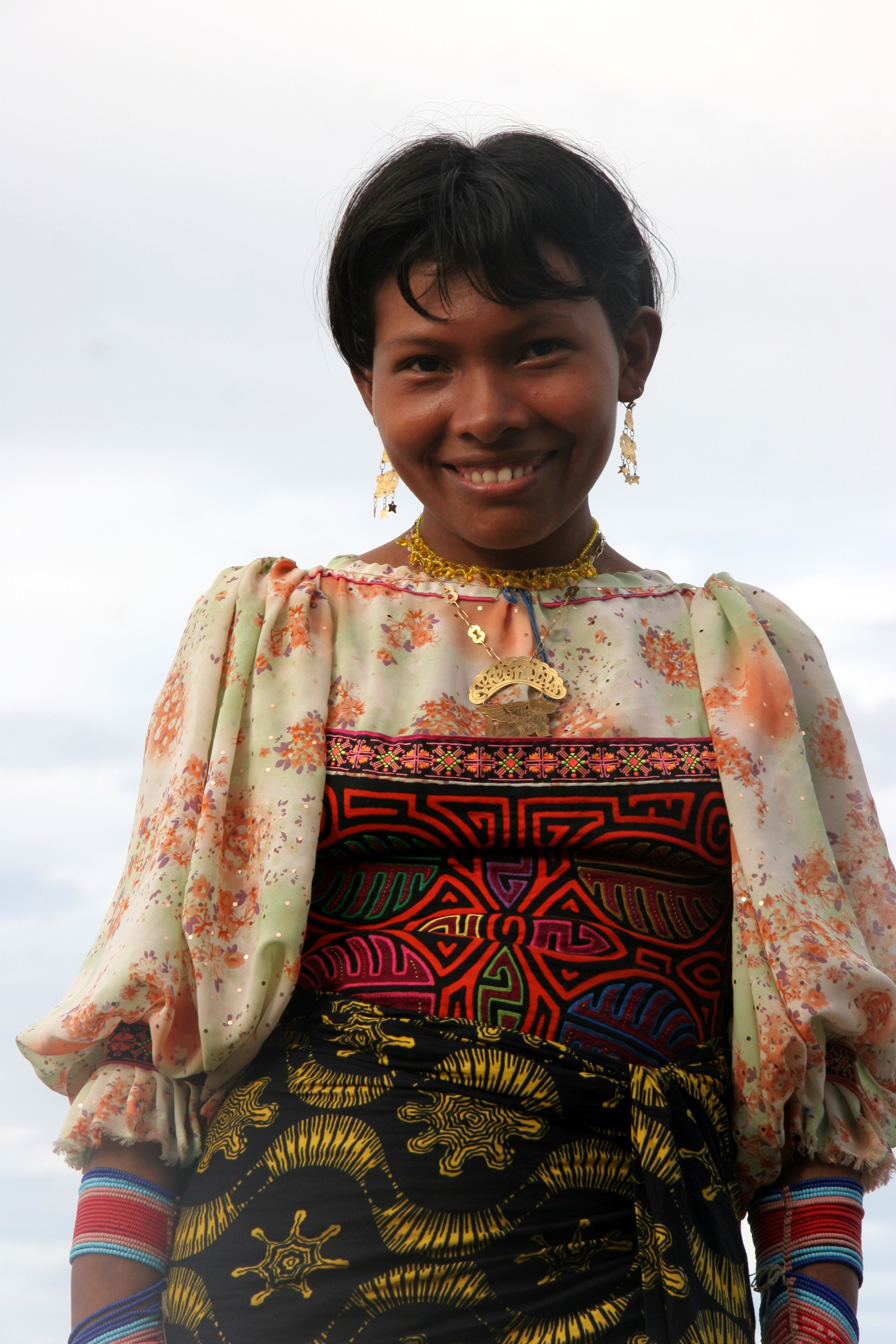
A Guna woman in traditional dress

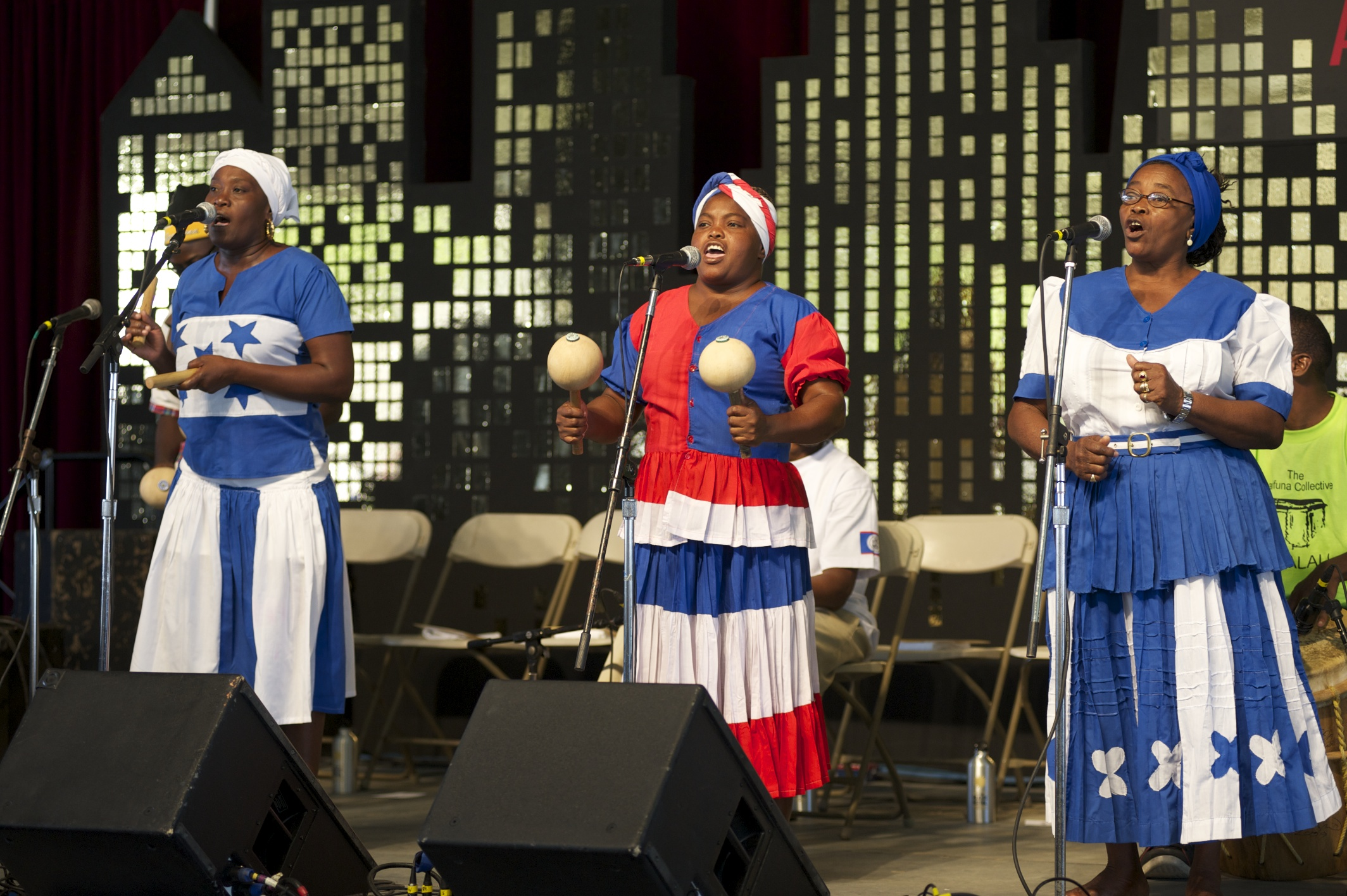
Umalali featuring the Garifuna Collective on the Peace Corps World Stage at Smithsonian Folklife Festival 2011

- Chibchan peoples
  - Boruca: Costa Rica
  - Bribri: Costa Rica
  - Cabécar: Costa Rica
  - Naso/Teribe/Tjër Di: Costa Rica, Panama
  - Guaymi/Waimi peoples
    - Bokota: Panama
    - Ngäbe–Buglé: Panama, Costa Rica
    - Talamanca peoplesl
  - Guna (Dule): Panama
  - Pech: Honduras
  - Votic peoples
    - Maleku: Costa Rica
    - Rama: Nicaragua
- Chocó/Embera-Wounaan peoples
  - Emberá/Chocó proper (ɛ̃berá): Panama
- Misumalpan peoples
  - Miskito (Miskitu): Honduras and Nicaragua
    - Tawira Miskito (Tawira Miskitu)
  - Sumalpan peoples
    - Sumo (Mayangna): Nicaragua
- Tolupan/Jicaque: Honduras
- Zambo/Cafuso peoples (mixed West African and Amerindian peoples)
  - Garífuna: A mixed West African (from several peoples) and Amerindian people (mainly from the Island Caribs - Kalhíphona) that traditionally speaks an Arawakan language in Belize and Honduras.
  - Miskito Sambu: A mixed West African (from several peoples) and Amerindian people (mainly from the original Miskito) that traditionally speaks Miskito, a Misumalpan language, and also Nicaragua Creole English in Nicaragua and Honduras.
- Black Seminoles: Florida, The Bahamas, and Mexico. (Mixed Seminole and African).

=== South America ===
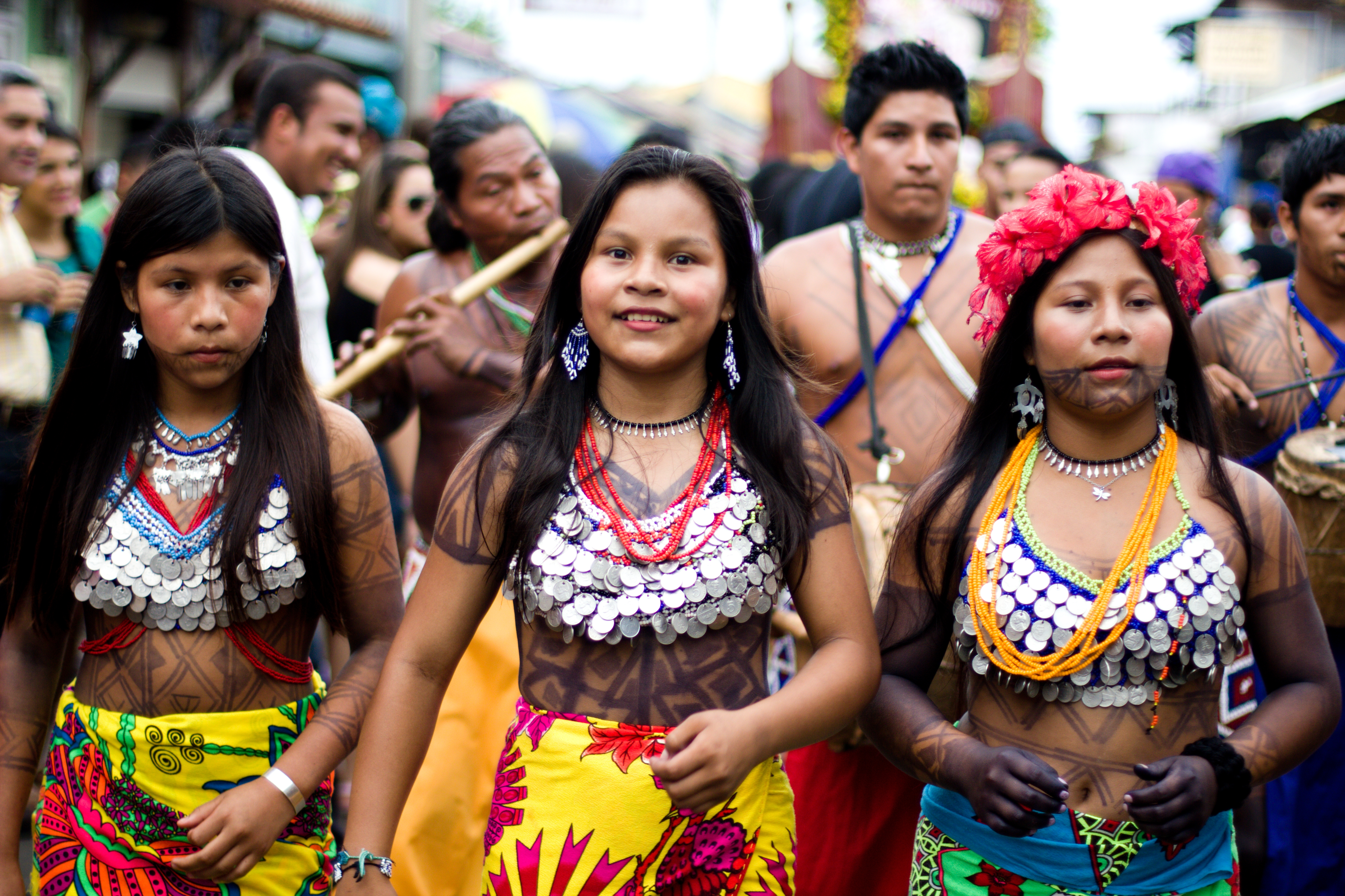
Emberá women

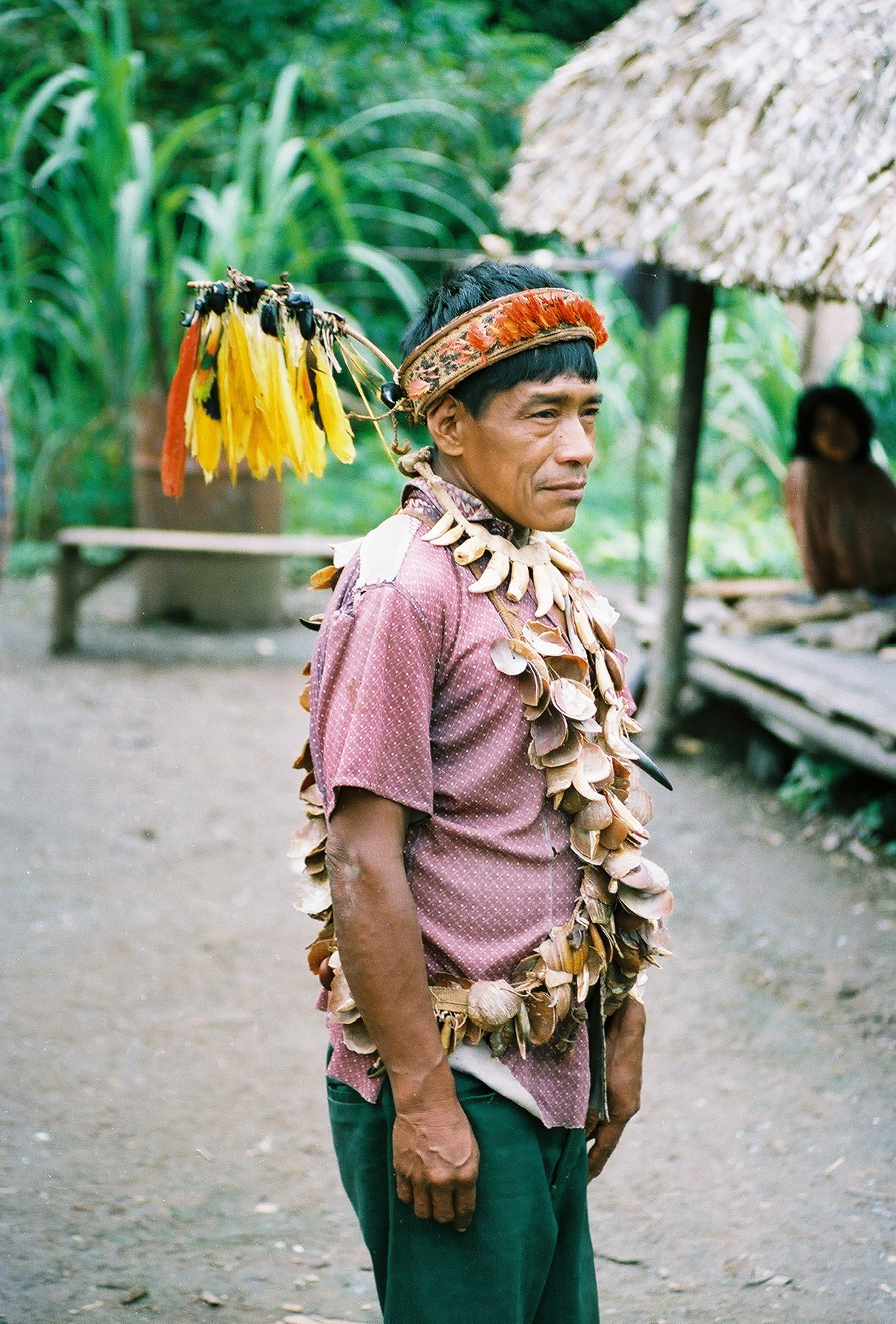
Urarina shaman, 1988

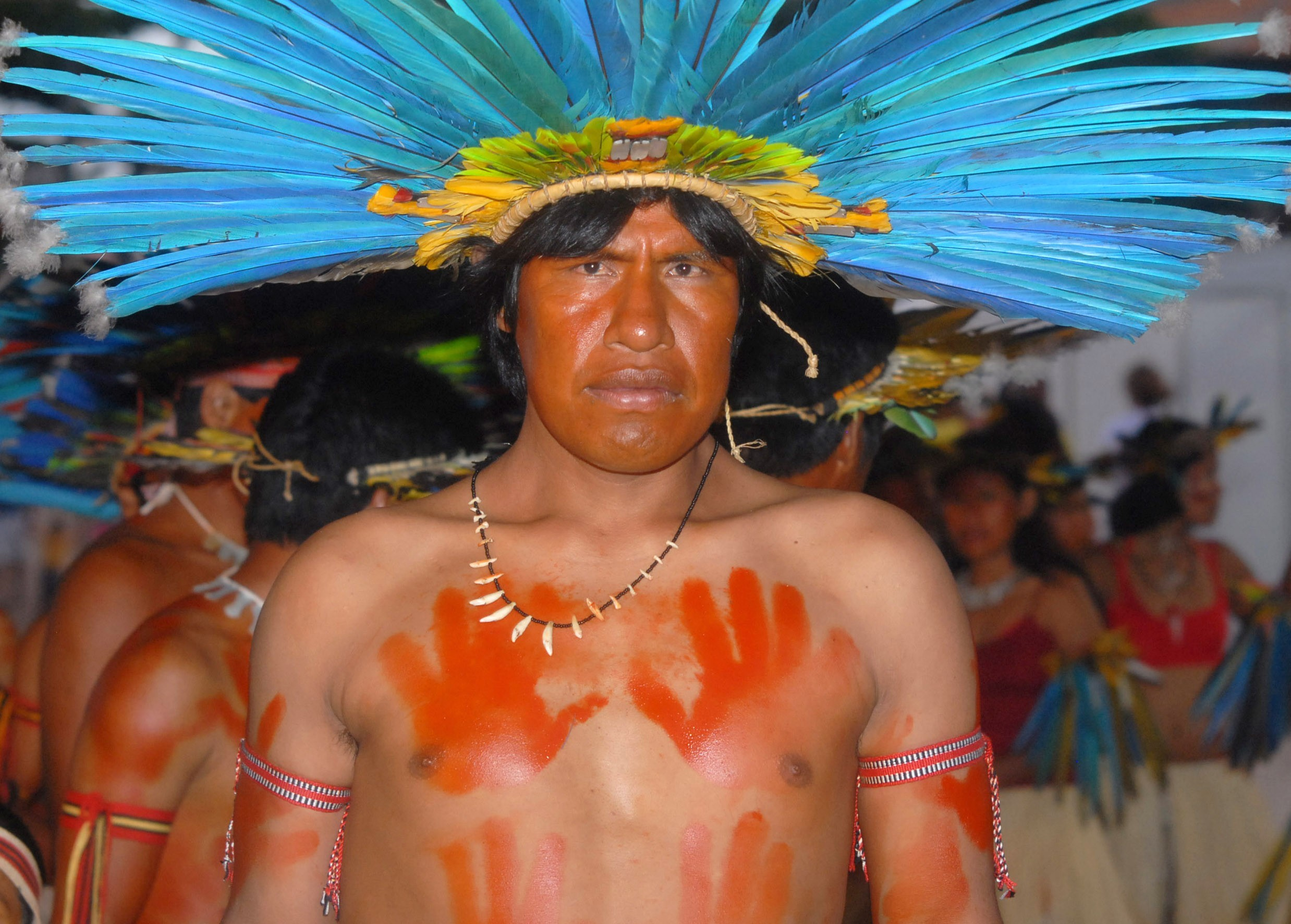
Bororo-Boe man from Mato Grosso at Brazil's Indigenous Games, 2007

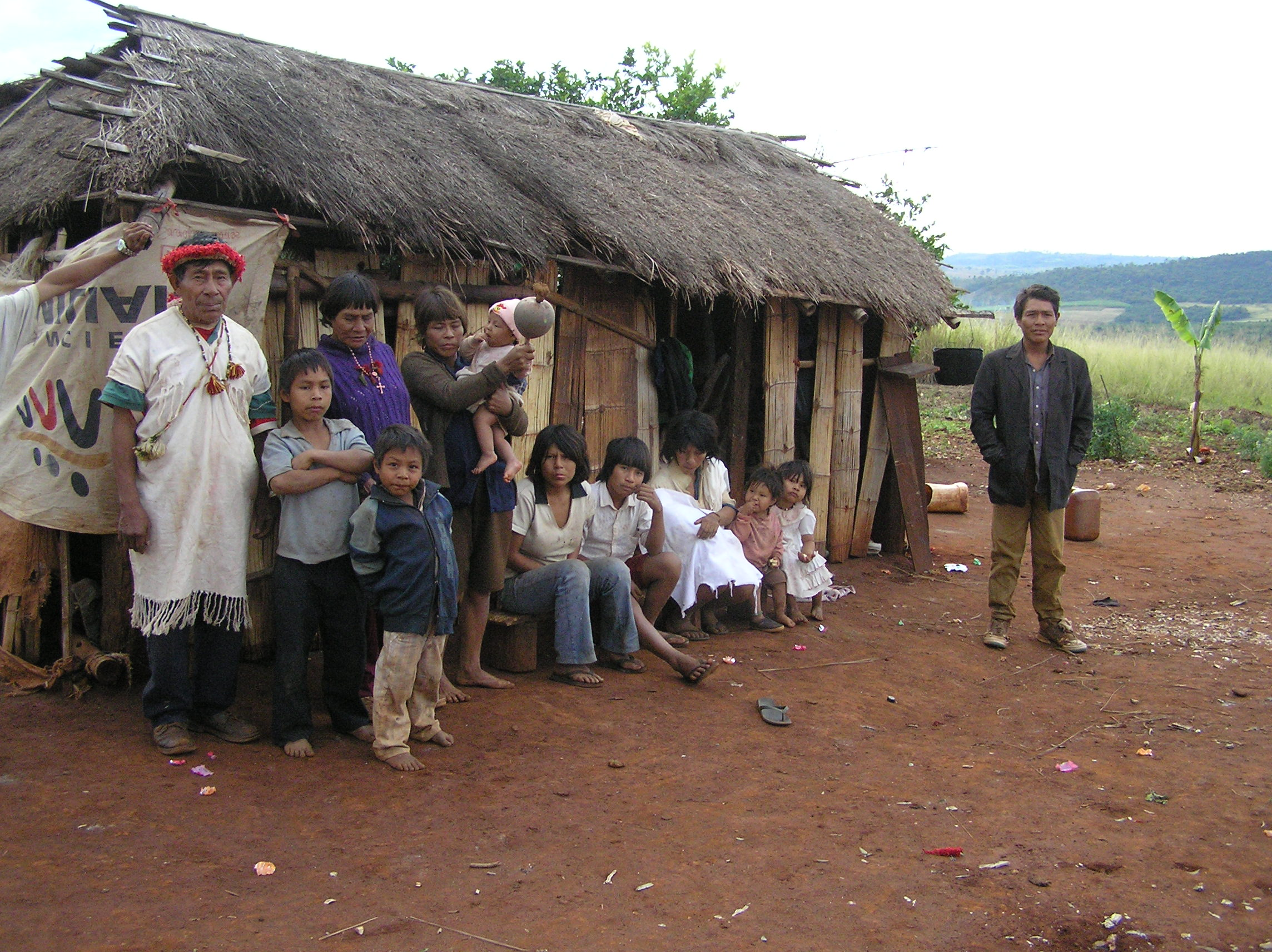
Pai Tavytera people in Amambay Department, Paraguay, 2012

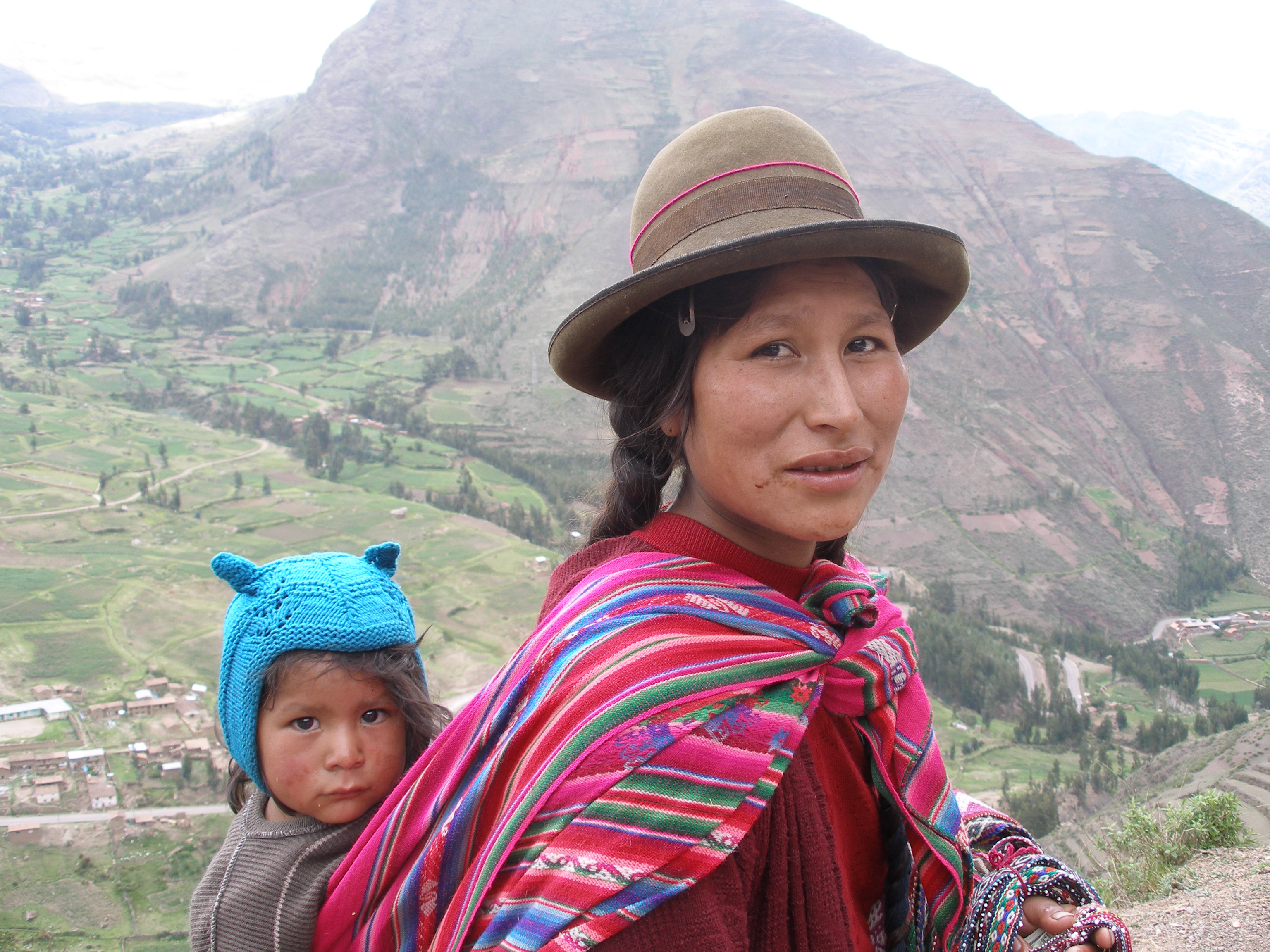
Quechua woman and child in the Sacred Valley, Peru

South America generally includes all of the continent and islands south of the Isthmus of Panama.

- Indigenous peoples in South America by country:
  - Indigenous peoples in Argentina
  - List of indigenous peoples of Brazil
  - Indigenous peoples in Chile
  - Indigenous peoples in Colombia
  - Indigenous peoples in Ecuador
  - Indigenous peoples in Peru
- Indigenous peoples in South America by native cultural regions

==== Isthmo-Colombian Area ====
- Arawakan peoples
  - Northern
    - Ta-Arawakan
      - Wayuu: Venezuela/Colombia
- Chibchan peoples
  - Cuna-Colombian
    - Guna (Dule): Panama
    - Chibcha–Motilon
      - Chibcha–Tunebo
        - U'wa: Colombia
    - Arwako-Chimila
      - Arwako
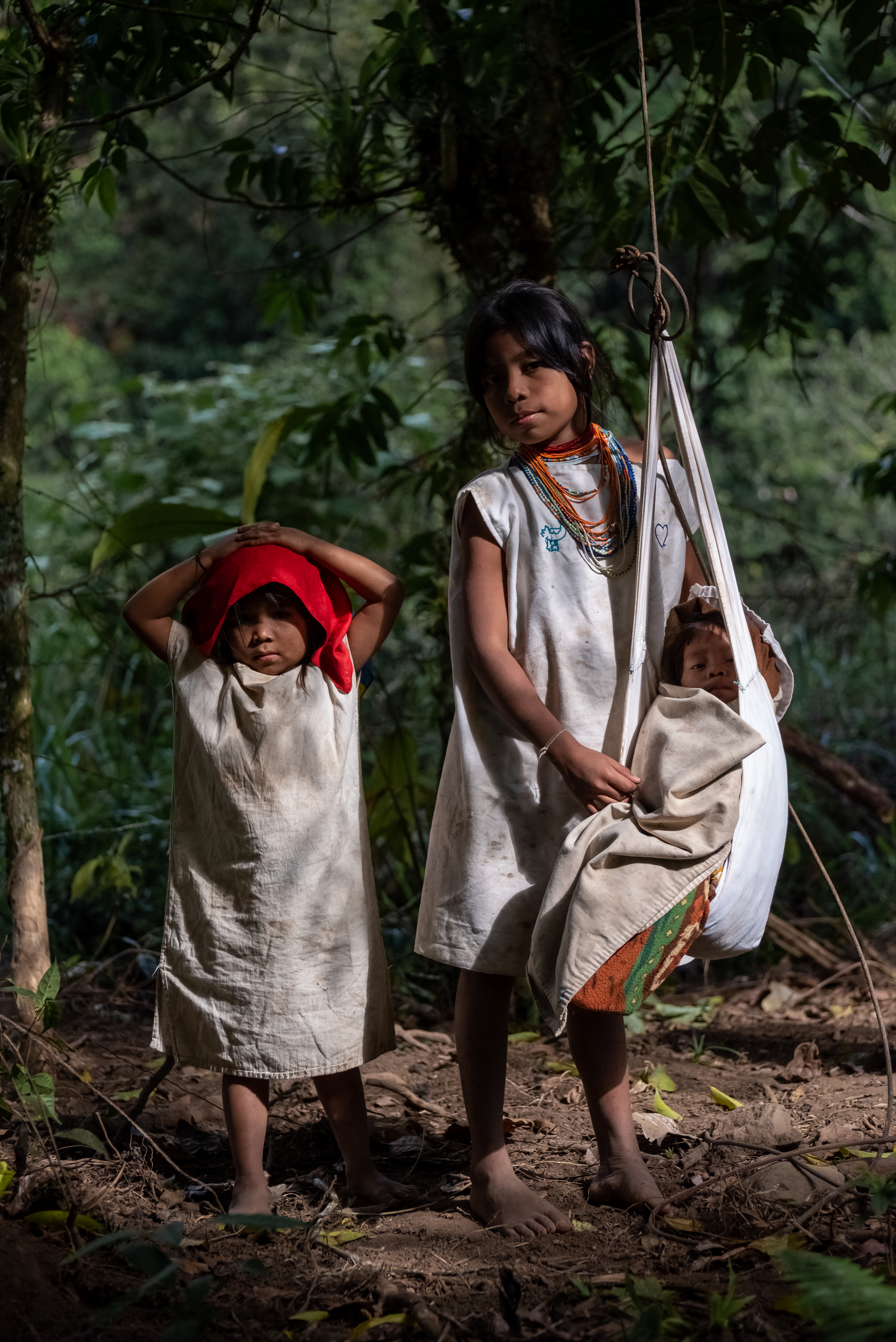
        - Three Wiwa children near Ciudad Perdida, Colombia, 2021
          Wiwa: Colombia
- Chocoan peoples
  - Embera (ɛ̃berá): Colombia/Panama
- Warao: Venezuela's Orinoco River delta region.

==== Amazon ====
- Arawakan peoples
  - Southern
    - Campa
      - Asháninka: Peru
- Barbacoan peoples
  - Awan
    - Awá-Kwaiker: Northern Ecuador
- Bora-Witoto peoples
  - Bora: Colombia/Peru
- Cahuapanan peoples
  - Chayahuita: Loreto, Peru
- Jivaroan (Shuar): Loreto and San Martín, Peru
- Nukak: Colombia
- Panoan peoples
  - Mainline Panoan
    - Nawa
      - Chama
        - Shipibo-Conibo people: Ucayali, Peru
          - Shipibo: Ucayali, Peru
      - Headwaters
        - Yora: Amazon rainforest, southeast Peru
  - Mayoruna
    - Mayo
      - Korubu (Dslala): Brazil
      - Matis: Brazil/Peru
      - Matsés: Brazil/Peru
- Pirahã: Brazil
- Ticuna-Yuri peoples
  - Ticuna (Tikuna): Brazil/Peru/Colombia
- Tucanoan peoples
  - Eastern
    - North
      - Tukano: Colombia
  - Western
    - Napo
      - Siona–Secoya
        - Secoya: Loreto, Peru/Ecuador
- Tupian peoples
  - Tupí-Guaraní
    - Tupi: Paraguay, Brazil, Bolivia, Peru and Argentina
      - Cocama-Omagua
        - Cocama-Cocamilla (Kokáma): Loreto, Peru
    - Tapirape: Brazil
    - Wayampí
      - Guajá
        - Awá-Guajá: eastern Amazonian rainforest, Brazil
- Urarina (Kachá): Chambira Basin, Loreto Peru
- Yanomami (Yanõmami/Yanõmami Thëpë): Venezuela/Brazil

===== Guianas =====
- Cariban peoples
  - Galibi/Kalina (Mainland Caribs): Guianas, Venezuela (northern coast of South America)
  - Yekuana
  - Eñapa (Panare)
  - Pemóng
    - Pemóng
    - Makuxi: Brazil, Guyana
- Yanomami (Yanõmami/Yanõmami Thëpë): Venezuela/Brazil
- Piaroa (Wothïha): Venezuela/Colombia

==== Eastern Highlands (Brazilian Highlands) ====
- Charruan peoples
  - Charrúa: Uruguay, Brazil and Argentina
- Macro-Gê peoples
  - Bororoan
    - Bororo: Mato Grosso, Brazil
  - Ofaie
    - Karajá/Iny: Brazil
- Tupian peoples
  - Tupí-Guaraní
    - Guaraní (I)
      - Ache: Paraguay
      - Pai Tavytera: Paraguay
      - Guaraní
        - Guaraní (Abá/Avá): Paraguay, Uruguay, Brazil, Bolivia and Argentina
    - Tupi: Paraguay, Brazil, Bolivia, Peru and Argentina
      - Cocama-Omagua
        - Cocama-Cocamilla (Kokáma): Loreto, Peru
    - Tapirape: Brazil
    - Wayampí
      - Guajá
        - Awá-Guajá: eastern Amazonian rainforest, Brazil

==== Chaco ====
- Mascoian peoples
  - Enxet: Paraguay
- Matacoan peoples
  - Wichí: the Chaco, Argentina/Bolivia
- Zamucoan peoples
  - Ayoreo: the Chaco, Paraguay/Bolivia

==== Central Andes ====
- Atacama people: Chile, Argentina, and Bolivia
- Aymaran peoples
  - Aymara: Peru/Bolivia/Chile
- Diaguita: Chile/Argentina
- Maina people: Peru
- Nasa: Colombia
- Quechuan peoples
  - Quechua (Nunakuna/Runakuna/Kichwa/Inga)
- Uru people: Lake Titicaca, Peru and Bolivia

==== Southern Cone ====
===== Araucania =====
- Araucanian peoples
  - Mapuche (Araucanians): Chile/Argentina
  - Picunche: Chile
  - Pehuenche: Chile/Argentina
  - Huilliche: Chile

===== Pampas =====
- Puelche: Argentina
- Charrúa: Uruguay
- Guenoa: Argentina, Uruguay and Brazil

===== Patagonia =====
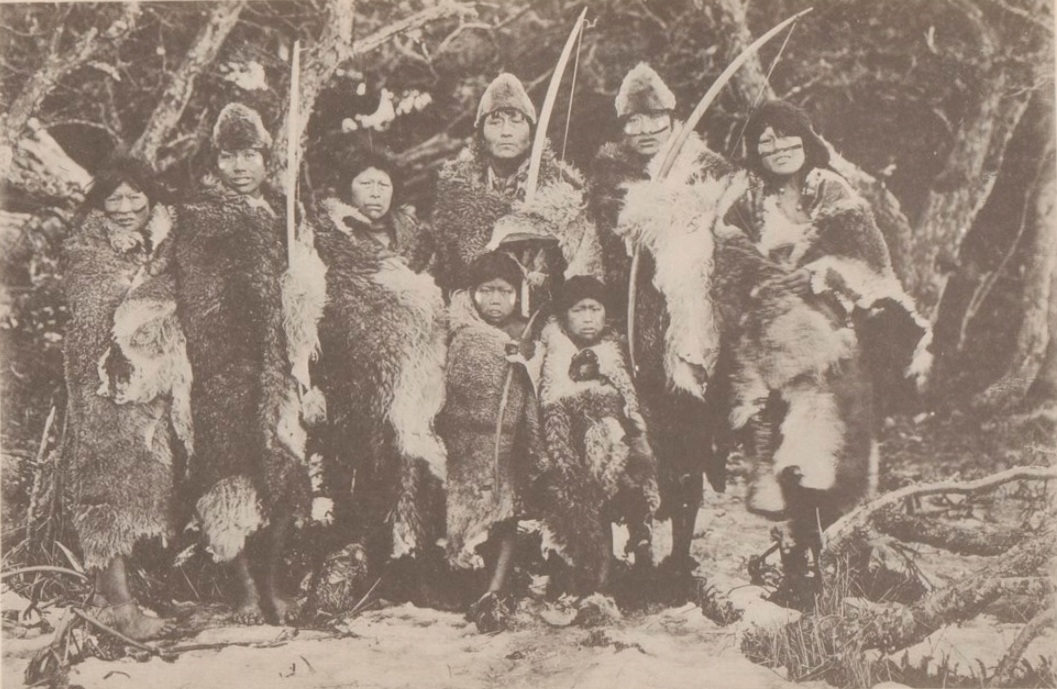
The Selkʼnam of Tierra del Fuego, c. 1915

- Chono: Chiloé, Guaitecas and Chonos, Chile
- Tehuelche: Southern Chile/Argentina
- Alacalufe (Kawésqar): Tierra del Fuego, Chile
- Selkʼnam (Ona): Tierra del Fuego, Argentina and Chile
- Yaghan (Yámana): Tierra del Fuego, Chile
- Haush (Manek'enk): Tierra del Fuego, Argentina

=== Caribbean ===
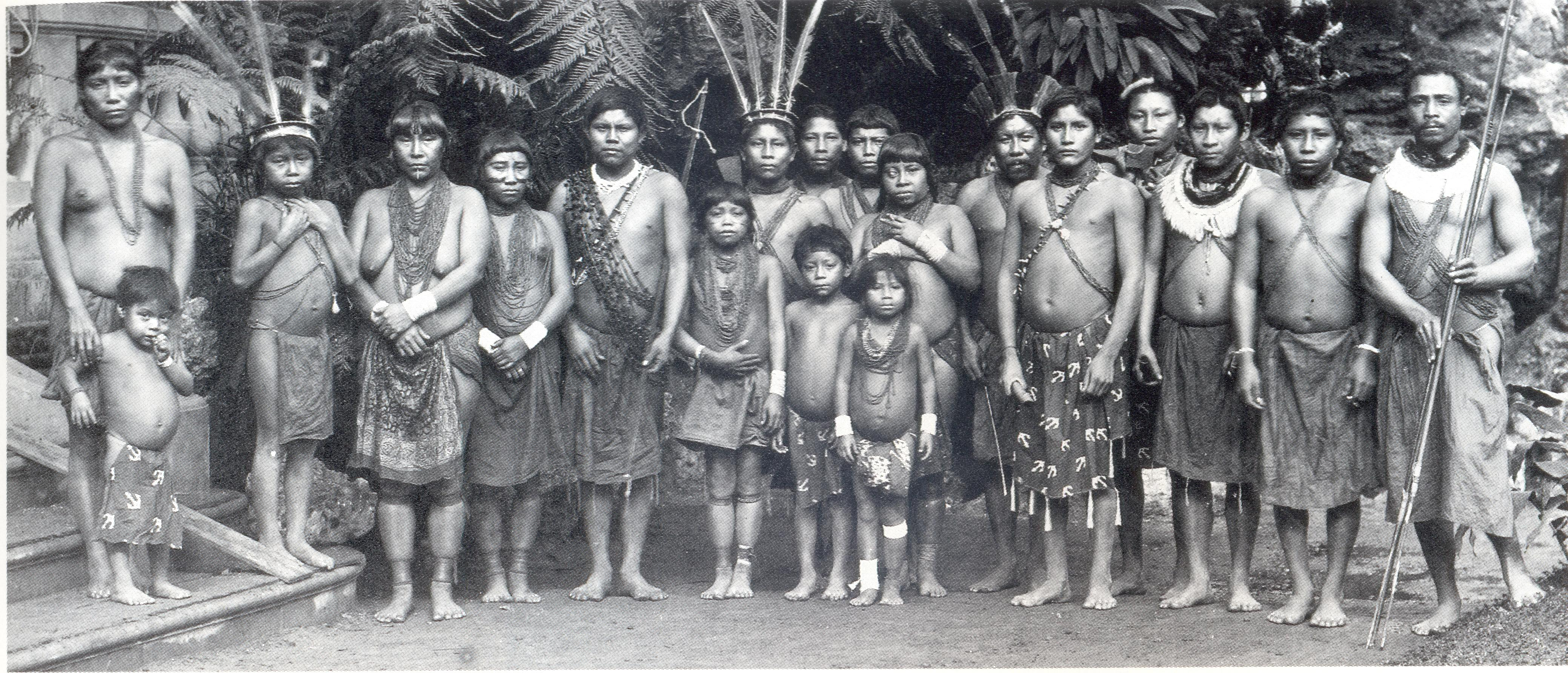
Portrait of the Kali'na exhibited at the Jardin d'Acclimatation in Paris in 1892

The West Indies, or the Caribbean, generally includes the island chains of the Caribbean Sea, namely the Lucayan Archipelago, the Greater Antilles, and the Lesser Antilles.

- Arawakan peoples
  - Northern
    - Circum-Caribbean/Ta-Arawakan peoples
      - Eyeri/Igneri: Lesser Antilles. An Arawak people, may have been the Kalinago/Island Caribs before Caribbeanization. (The Island Caribs had the tradition that the Igneri were the older people of Lesser Antilles but they could have been ancestors of the majority of Island Caribs).
      - Island Caribs (Carib/Kalinago/Kalhíphona): Lesser Antilles. Often called "Island Caribs" (but may have been an older arawak people with a carib conquering warrior elite or influenced by Mainland Caribs. Apparently, the majority of the people spoke an arawakan language and not a carib one.)
      - Taíno: Amerindians who originally inhabited the Greater Antilles of the Caribbean, they are of Arawakan descent.
        - Neo-Taíno nations Some scholars distinguish between the Taíno and Neo-Taíno groups. Neo-Taíno groups were also native to the Antilles islands, but had distinctive languages and cultural practices that differed from the High Taíno. These groups include:
          - Ciboney: a term preferred in Cuban historical texts for the neo-Taino-Siboney nations of the island of Cuba.
          - Lucayans: Based in the Bahamas
- Ciguayo: Eastern Hispaniola
- Macorix: Hispaniola
- Guanahatabey: Western Cuba

== Oceania ==
Oceania includes most islands of the Pacific Ocean, New Guinea, New Zealand and the continent of Australia.

List of peoples by geographical and ethnolinguistic grouping:

=== Australia ===
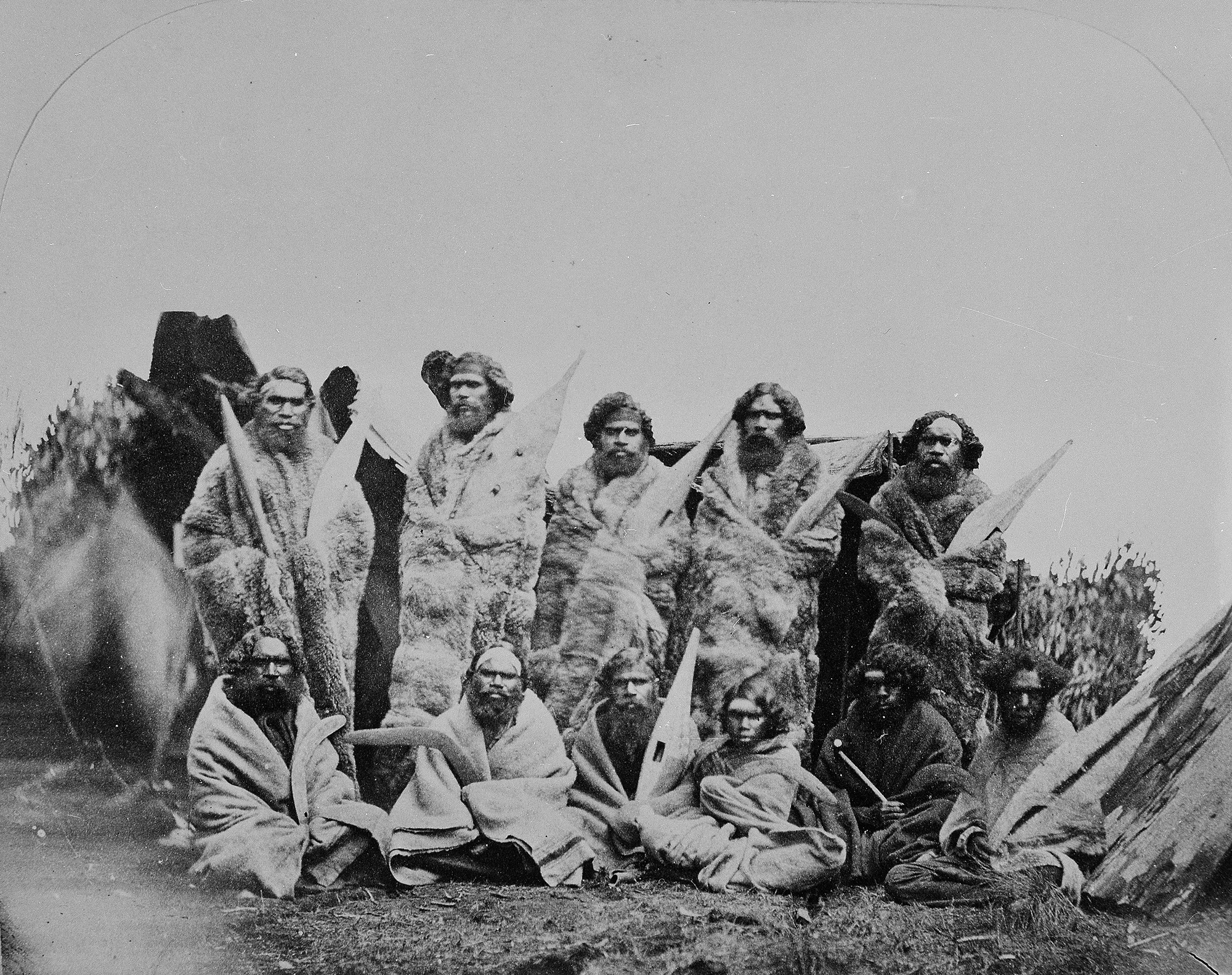
A group of Aboriginal men in possum-skin cloaks (c. 1858) in Victoria

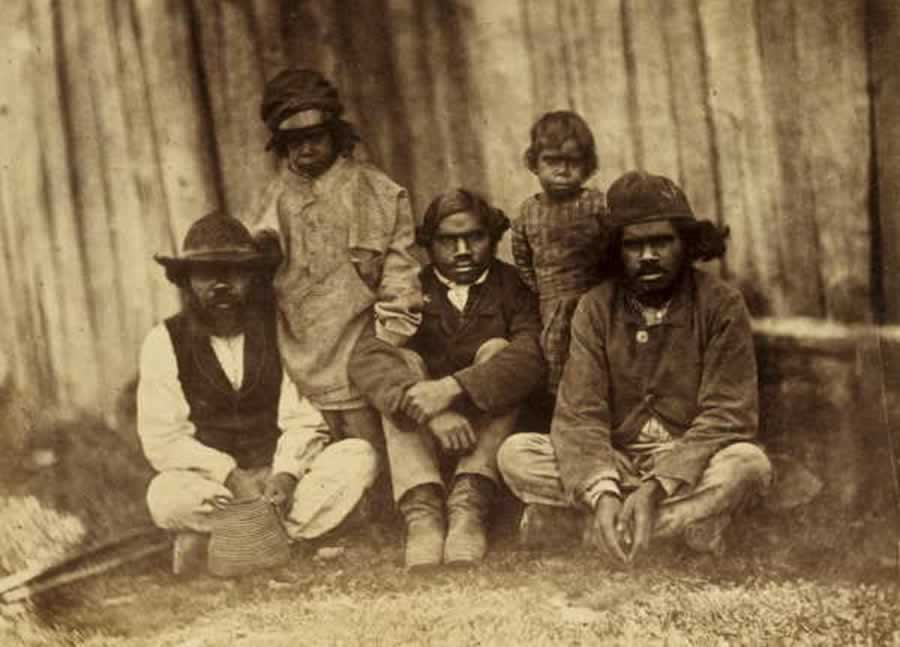
Aboriginal farmers in Victoria, Australia, 1858

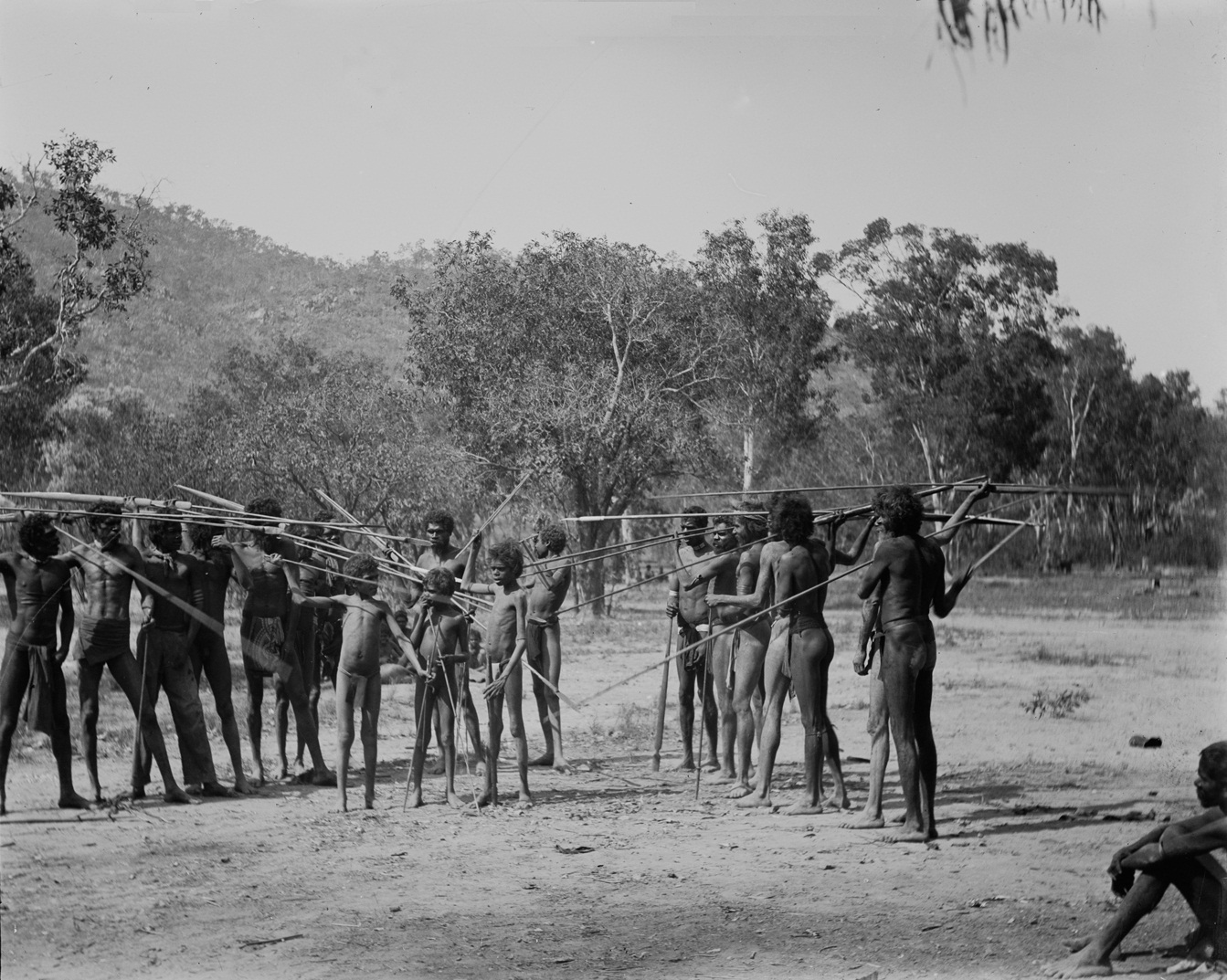
Aboriginal men in Northern Territory, circa 1905

Indigenous Australians include Aboriginal Australians on the mainland and Tiwi Islands as well as Torres Strait Islander peoples from the Torres Strait Islands.

- Aboriginal Australians include hundreds of groupings of people, defined by various overlapping characteristics such as language, culture and geography, which may include sub-groups. The Indigenous peoples of the island state of Tasmania and the Tiwi people (of the Tiwi Islands off the Northern Territory) are also Aboriginal peoples, who are genetically and culturally distinct from Torres Strait Islander peoples.
- Torres Strait Islander peoples are culturally and linguistically Papuo-Austronesian, and the various peoples of the islands are of predominantly Melanesian descent. The Torres Strait Islands are part of the state of Queensland.

==== Western Desert ====
- Pama-Nyungan peoples
  - Kunapa: Northern Territory, Australia
  - Pini: Western Australia, Australia
  - Spinifex: Western Australia, Australia
  - Wangkatha: Western Australia, Australia
  - Warumungu: Northern Territory, Australia
  - Wati peoples
    - Antakirinja: South Australia, Australia
    - Kokatha: South Australia, Australia
    - Luritja: Northern Territory, Australia
    - Madoidja: Western Australia, Australia
    - Maduwongga: Western Australia, Australia
    - Martu peoples
      - Kartudjara: Western Australia, Australia
      - Keiadjara: Western Australia, Australia
      - Mandjildjara: Western Australia, Australia
      - Putidjara: Western Australia, Australia
      - Wanman: Western Australia, Australia
    - Marrngu peoples
      - Karajarri: Great Sandy Desert, Western Australia, Australia
      - Mangarla: Great Sandy Desert, Western Australia, Australia
      - Nyangumarta: Great Sandy Desert, Western Australia, Australia
    - Ngaanyatjarra: Northern Territory, Australia
    - Ngaatjatjarra: Western Australia, Australia
    - Pintupi: Western Australia, Australia
    - Pitjantjatjara: Northern Territory, Australia
    - Wangkatjunga: Western Australia, Australia
    - Yankunytjatjara: South Australia, Australia
    - Yulparija: Western Australia, Australia
    - Yumu: Northern Territory, Australia
  - Yankuntjatjarra: South Australia, Australia
- Mirndi peoples
  - Ngurlun peoples
    - Ngarnka: Northern Territory, Australia
    - Wambaya: Northern Territory, Australia

==== Kimberley ====
- Bunuban peoples
  - Bunuba: Fitzroy Crossing, Western Australia, Australia
  - Gooniyandi: Fitzroy Crossing, Western Australia, Australia
- Jarrakan peoples
  - Gija: Halls Creek and Kununurra, Western Australia, Australia
  - Miriwoongic peoples
    - Miriwoong: Kununurra, Western Australia, Australia
    - Gajirrawoong: Eastern Kimberley and Northern Territory, Australia
- Nyulnyulan peoples
  - Nyulnyulic peoples
    - Bardi: Dampier Peninsula, Western Australia, Australia
    - Jabirr Jabirr: Dampier Peninsula, Western Australia, Australia
    - Jawi: Dampier Peninsula, Western Australia, Australia
    - Nimanburru: Dampier Peninsula, Western Australia, Australia
    - Nyulnyul: Dampier Peninsula, Western Australia, Australia
  - Dyukun peoples
    - Jugun: Dampier Peninsula, Western Australia, Australia
    - Ngombal: Dampier Peninsula, Western Australia, Australia
    - Nyigina: Dampier Peninsula, Western Australia, Australia
    - Warrwa: Dampier Peninsula, Western Australia, Australia
    - Yawuru: Dampier Peninsula, Western Australia, Australia
- Worrorran peoples
  - Ngarinyin: Western Australia, Australia
  - Worrorra: Western Australia, Australia
  - Wunambal: Western Australia, Australia

==== Northwest ====
- Pama-Nyungan peoples
  - Ngayarda peoples
    - Bailgu: Pilbara region, Western Australia, Australia
    - Inawongga: Pilbara region, Western Australia, Australia
    - Jadira: Pilbara region, Western Australia, Australia
    - Kurrama: Pilbara region, Western Australia, Australia
    - Mardudunera: Pilbara region, Western Australia, Australia
    - Ngarla: Pilbara region, Western Australia, Australia
    - Ngarluma: Pilbara region, Western Australia, Australia
    - Niabali: Pilbara region, Western Australia, Australia
    - Nhuwala: Pilbara region, Western Australia, Australia
    - Nyamal: Pilbara region, Western Australia, Australia
    - Panyjima: Pilbara region, Western Australia, Australia
    - Tjuroro: Pilbara region, Western Australia, Australia
  - Kanyara-Mantharta peoples
    - Kanyara peoples
      - Baiyungu: Gascoyne region, Western Australia, Australia
      - Binigura: Pilbara region, Western Australia, Australia
      - Buruna: Mid West region, Western Australia, Australia
      - Thalanyji: Pilbara region, Western Australia, Australia
      - Yinikutira: Exmouth, Western Australia, Australia
    - Mantharta peoples
      - Djiwali: Pilbara region, Western Australia, Australia
      - Tharrkari: Gascoyne region, Western Australia, Australia
      - Tenma: Pilbara region, Western Australia, Australia
      - Warriyangga: Gascoyne region, Western Australia, Australia
  - Kartu peoples
    - Badimaya: Mid West region, Western Australia, Australia
    - Maia: Mid West region, Western Australia, Australia
    - Malgana: Mid West region, Western Australia, Australia
    - Nanda: Mid West region, Western Australia, Australia
    - Nokaan: Mid West region, Western Australia, Australia
    - Wajarri: Mid West region, Western Australia, Australia
    - Widi: Mid West region, Western Australia, Australia
    - Yingkarta: Gascoyne region, Western Australia, Australia

==== Southwest ====
- Pama-Nyungan peoples
  - Nyungic peoples
    - Noongar peoples
      - Amangu: Geraldton Sandplains, Western Australia, Australia
      - Ballardong: Avon Wheatbelt, Western Australia, Australia
      - Yued: Swan Coastal Plain, Western Australia, Australia
      - Kaneang: Jarrah Forest, Western Australia, Australia
      - Koreng: Mallee, Western Australia, Australia
      - Mineng: Warren, Western Australia, Australia
      - Njakinjaki: Avon Wheatbelt, Western Australia, Australia
      - Njunga: Esperance Plains, Western Australia, Australia
      - Bibulman: Warren, Western Australia, Australia
      - Pindjarup: Jarrah Forest, Western Australia, Australia
      - Wardandi: Swan Coastal Plain, Western Australia, Australia
      - Whadjuk: Jarrah Forest, Western Australia, Australia
      - Wiilman: Western Australia, Australia
      - Wudjari: Mallee, Western Australia, Australia
    - Kalaako: Goldfields–Esperance region, Western Australia, Australia
    - Kalamaia: Western Australia, Australia
    - Mirning peoples
      - Mirning: Western Australia and South Australia, Australia
      - Ngadjumaya: Goldfields–Esperance region, Western Australia, Australia
    - Yingkarta: Gascoyne region, Western Australia, Australia

==== Fitzmaurice Basin ====
- Yirram peoples
  - Nungali: Northern Territory, Australia
  - Jaminjung: Northern Territory, Australia
- Macro-Gunwinyguan peoples
  - Kungarakany: Northern Territory, Australia
    - Warrayic peoples
      - Awarai: Northern Territory, Australia
      - Awinmul: Northern Territory, Australia
      - Wulwulam: Northern Territory, Australia
- Daly peoples
  - Wagaydic peoples
    - Wadjiginy: Anson Bay, Northern Territory, Australia
  - Mulluk-Mulluk: Northern Territory, Australia
  - Western Daly peoples
    - Emmiyangal: Anson Bay, Northern Territory, Australia
    - Marranunggu: Daly River, Northern Territory, Australia
    - Menthe: Northern Territory, Australia
    - Marrithiyal: Daly River, Northern Territory, Australia
    - Maramanindji: Northern Territory, Australia
    - Marridan: Northern Territory, Australia
    - Marri Amu: Northern Territory, Australia
    - Marri Tjevin: Northern Territory, Australia
    - Marijedi: Northern Territory, Australia
    - Marri Ngarr: Moyle River, Northern Territory, Australia
    - Mati Ke: Wadeye, Northern Territory, Australia
  - Eastern Daly peoples
    - Madngela: Northern Territory, Australia
    - Yunggor: Northern Territory, Australia
  - Southern Daly peoples
    - Murrinh-Patha: Wadeye, Northern Territory, Australia
    - Muringura people: Fitzmaurice River, Northern Territory, Australia
    - Ngan'gimerri: Daly River, Northern Territory, Australia

==== Arnhem Land ====
- Pama-Nyungan peoples
  - Yolngu: Northern Territory, Australia
- Macro-Gunwinyguan peoples
  - Maningrida peoples
    - Burarra: Maningrida, Northern Territory, Australia
    - Gadjalivia: Blyth River, Northern Territory, Australia
    - Gunavidji: Maningrida, Northern Territory, Australia
    - Gurr-Goni: Maningrida, Northern Territory, Australia
    - Nagara: Blyth River, Northern Territory, Australia
  - East Arnhem peoples
    - Anindilyakwa: Northern Territory, Australia
    - Ngandi: Northern Territory, Australia
    - Nunggubuyu: Northern Territory, Australia
  - Marran peoples
    - Alawa: Northern Territory, Australia
    - Mangarayi: Northern Territory, Australia
    - Marra: Northern Territory, Australia
    - Warndarrang: Northern Territory, Australia
    - Yukul: Northern Territory, Australia
  - Gaagudju: Northern Territory, Australia
  - Gunwinyguan peoples
    - Gunwinggic peoples
      - Bininj: Northern Territory, Australia
      - Gambalang: Northern Territory, Australia
    - Dalabon: Northern Territory, Australia
    - Jawoyn: Nitmiluk National Park, Northern Territory, Australia
    - Jala peoples
      - Ngalakgan: Northern Territory, Australia
      - Rembarrnga: Northern Territory, Australia
- Iwaidjan peoples
  - Amurdak: Cobourg Peninsula, Northern Territory, Australia
  - Iwaidjic peoples
    - Maung: Goulburn Islands, Northern Territory, Australia
    - Warrkbi
      - Gaari: Cobourg Peninsula, Northern Territory, Australia
      - Iwaidja: Cobourg Peninsula, Northern Territory, Australia
- Marrku-Wurrugu peoples
  - Wurango: Cobourg Peninsula, Northern Territory, Australia
  - Yaako: Croker Island, Northern Territory, Australia

==== Top End ====
- Tiwi: Tiwi Islands, Northern Territory, Australia
- Darwin Region peoples
  - Larrakia: Darwin, Northern Territory, Australia
  - Limilngan
    - Puneitja: Northern Territory, Australia
    - Beriguruk: Northern Territory, Australia
    - Djerimanga: Northern Territory, Australia
  - Umbugarlic peoples
    - Ngomburr: Alligator Rivers, Northern Territory, Australia
- Giimbiyu: Alligator Rivers, Northern Territory, Australia

==== Gulf Country ====
- Pama-Nyungan peoples
  - Mayabic peoples
    - Mayi-Kutuna: Queensland, Australia
    - Marrago: Queensland, Australia
    - Maikulan: Queensland, Australia
    - Maithakari: Queensland, Australia
    - Maijabi: Queensland, Australia
    - Ngaun: Queensland, Australia
    - Wanamara: Queensland, Australia
  - Paman peoples
    - Southwestern Paman peoples
      - Agwamin: Queensland, Australia
      - Kok-Nar: Queensland, Australia
      - Mbara: Queensland, Australia
      - Yanga: Queensland, Australia
- Tankgkic peoples
  - Lardil: Mornington Island, Wellesley Islands, Queensland, Australia
  - Kaiadilt: Wellesley Islands, Queensland, Australia
  - Yukulta: Queensland, Australia
  - Nguburinji: Queensland, Australia
  - Mingin: Queensland, Australia
- Garawan peoples
  - Garrwa: Northern Territory and Queensland, Australia
  - Waanyi: Queensland, Australia

==== Cape York ====
===== West Cape =====
- Pama-Nyungan peoples
  - Paman peoples
    - North Cape York Paman peoples
      - Djagaraga: Cape York Peninsula, Queensland, Australia
      - Tjungundji: Cape York Peninsula, Queensland, Australia
      - Injinoo: Cape York Peninsula, Queensland, Australia
      - Luthigh: Cape York Peninsula, Queensland, Australia
      - Mbewum: Cape York Peninsula, Queensland, Australia
      - Tjungundji: Cape York Peninsula, Queensland, Australia
      - Totj: Cape York Peninsula, Queensland, Australia
      - Unduyamo: Cape York Peninsula, Queensland, Australia
      - Wik peoples
        - Wik-Mungkan: Cape York Peninsula, Queensland, Australia
        - Kugu Nganhcara: Cape York Peninsula, Queensland, Australia
        - Wiknatanja: Cape York Peninsula, Queensland, Australia
        - Wik Me'anh: Cape York Peninsula, Queensland, Australia
        - Wik Epa: Cape York Peninsula, Queensland, Australia
        - Wik Elken: Cape York Peninsula, Queensland, Australia
        - Wik Paach: Cape York Peninsula, Queensland, Australia
        - Wik Ompom: Cape York Peninsula, Queensland, Australia
      - Wimaranga: Cape York Peninsula, Queensland, Australia
      - Winduwinda: Cape York Peninsula, Queensland, Australia
      - Thaypan peoples
        - Tagalag: Cape York Peninsula, Queensland, Australia

===== East Cape =====
- Pama-Nyungan peoples
  - Paman peoples
    - North Cape York Paman peoples
      - Yadhaykenu: Cape York Peninsula, Queensland, Australia
      - Wuthathi: Cape York Peninsula, Queensland, Australia
      - Kaantju, Coen, Queensland, Australia
      - Pakadji: Cape York Peninsula, Queensland, Australia
      - Uutaalnganu: Cape York Peninsula, Queensland, Australia
    - Lamalamic peoples
      - Lama Lama: Cape York Peninsula, Queensland, Australia
    - Northeast Paman peoples
      - Umpila: Cape York Peninsula, Queensland, Australia

==== Daintree Rainforest ====
- Pama-Nyungan peoples
  - Paman peoples
    - Djabugay: Queensland, Australia
    - Yidiny: Queensland, Australia
    - Mbabaram: Atherton Tableland, Queensland, Australia
  - Dyirbalic peoples
    - Dyirbal: Atherton Tableland, Queensland, Australia
    - Warrgamay: Queensland, Australia
    - Nyawigi: Halifax Bay, Queensland, Australia

==== Lake Eyre Basin ====
- Pama-Nyungan peoples
  - Kalkatungic peoples
    - Kalkatungu: Queensland, Australia
    - Yalarnnga: Queensland, Australia
  - Karnic peoples
    - Arabana: South Australia, Australia
    - Wangkangurru: Simpson Desert, South Australia, Australia
    - Pitapita: Queensland, Australia
    - Yandruwandha: South Australia, Australia
    - Yawarrawarrka: South Australia, Australia
    - Mitaka: Queensland, Australia
    - Wanggumara: Queensland, Australia
  - Yarli peoples
    - Karenggapa: New South Wales, Australia

==== Spencer Gulf ====
- Pama-Nyungan peoples
  - Thura-Yura peoples
    - Wirangu: South Australia, Australia
    - Nauo: Eyre Peninsula, South Australia, Australia
    - Barngarla: Eyre Peninsula, South Australia, Australia
    - Kuyani: South Australia, Australia
    - Adnyamathanha: Flinders Ranges, South Australia, Australia
    - Malyangapa: New South Wales, Australia
    - Ngadjuri: South Australia, Australia
    - Nukunu: South Australia, Australia
    - Narungga: Yorke Peninsula, South Australia, Australia
    - Kaurna: Adelaide Plains, South Australia, Australia
    - Peramangk: Adelaide Plains, South Australia, Australia

==== Murray-Darling Basin ====
- Pama-Nyungan peoples
  - Yotayotic peoples
    - Yorta Yorta: New South Wales and Victoria, Australia
    - Ngarrimouro: New South Wales and Victoria, Australia
  - Lower Murray peoples
    - Ngarrindjeri: South Australia, Australia
    - Ngaiawang: South Australia, Australia
    - Yuyu peoples
      - Ngawait: Murray River, South Australia, Australia
      - Erawirung: Riverland, South Australia, Australia
      - Ngintait: South Australia and Victoria, Australia
      - Ngarkat: South Australia, Australia
    - Kureinji: New South Wales, Australia
    - Jitajita: New South Wales, Australia
    - Tatitati: Murray River, Victoria, Australia
  - Wiradhuric peoples
    - Gamilaraay: New South Wales and Queensland, Australia
    - Wiradjuri: New South Wales, Australia
    - Ngiyampaa: New South Wales, Australia
  - Muruwari: New South Wales and Queensland, Australia

==== Northeast ====
- Pama-Nyungan peoples
  - Lower Burdekin peoples
    - Juru: Queensland, Australia
    - Bindal: Queensland, Australia
  - Maric peoples
    - Biri peoples
      - Gugu-Badhun: Burdekin River, Queensland, Australia
      - Yilba: Mackay, Queensland, Australia
      - Gia: Queensland, Australia
      - Biria: Queensland, Australia
      - Yambina: Queensland, Australia
      - Garaynbal: Queensland, Australia
      - Yangga: Queensland, Australia
      - Baranha: Queensland, Australia
      - Miyan: Queensland, Australia
      - Yuwibara: Queensland, Australia
    - Kingkel peoples
      - Darumbal: Queensland, Australia
      - Guwinmal: Queensland, Australia
  - Waka-Kabic peoples
    - Goreng Goreng: Queensland, Australia
    - Wulli Wulli: Queensland, Australia
    - Wakka Wakka: Queensland, Australia
    - Baruŋgam: Queensland, Australia
    - Gubbi Gubbi: Queensland, Australia
    - Butchulla: Fraser Island, Queensland, Australia
    - Jagera: Queensland, Australia

==== Southeast ====
- Pama-Nyungan peoples
  - Yugambeh-Bundjalung peoples
    - Bundjalung: New South Wales, Australia
    - Ngarbal: New South Wales, Australia
  - Gumbaynggiric peoples
    - Gumbaynggirr: Mid North Coast, New South Wales, Australia
    - Yaygirr: Coffs Harbour, New South Wales, Australia
  - Anēwan: Northern Tablelands, New South Wales, Australia
  - Yuin-Kuric peoples
    - Djangadi: Macleay Valley, New South Wales, Australia
    - Geawegal: Hunter Valley, New South Wales, Australia
    - Worimi: New South Wales, Australia
    - Wonnarua: New South Wales, Australia
    - Awabakal: New South Wales, Australia
    - Eora: New South Wales, Australia
    - Darug: New South Wales, Australia
    - Gandangara: New South Wales, Australia
    - Tharawal: Sydney, New South Wales, Australia
    - Ngarigo: New South Wales and Victoria, Australia
    - Koori: New South Wales and Victoria, Australia
  - Gippsland peoples
    - Gunai: Gippsland, Victoria, Australia
    - Bidawal: Gippsland, Victoria, Australia
    - Dhudhuroa: Victoria, Australia
  - Kulinic peoples
    - Kulin peoples
      - Wurundjeri: Yarra River, Victoria, Australia
      - Boonwurrung: Werribee River, Victoria, Australia
      - Wathaurong: Victoria, Australia
      - Taungurung: Victoria, Australia
      - Djadjawurrung: Victoria, Australia
    - Drual peoples
      - Bungandidj: Mount Gambier, South Australia, Australia
      - Gunditjmara: Victoria, Australia
    - Gulidjan: Lake Colac, Victoria, Australia

==== Tasmania ====
- Palawa peoples
  - Western Tasmanian peoples
    - Peerapper: Circular Head and Robbins Island, Tasmania, Australia
    - Toogee: Macquarie Harbour, Tasmania, Australia
  - Northern Tasmanian peoples
    - Tommeginne: Northern Tasmania, Australia
  - Northeastern Tasmanian peoples
    - Pyemmairre: Northeastern Tasmania, Australia
    - Tyerrernotepanner: Northern Midlands and Ben Lomond, Tasmania, Australia
  - Eastern Tasmanian peoples
    - Paredarerme: Oyster Bay, Tasmania, Australia
    - Lairmairrener: Big River, Tasmania, Australia
    - Nuennone: Bruny Island, Tasmania, Australia

==== Torres Strait Islands ====
- Torres Strait Islanders
  - Badu: Badu Island, Torres Strait Islands, Queensland, Australia
  - Kaurareg: Central Torres Strait Islands, Queensland, Australia
  - Mabuiag: Torres Strait Islands, Queensland, Australia
  - Meriam: Eastern Torres Strait Islands, Queensland, Australia

=== Melanesia ===
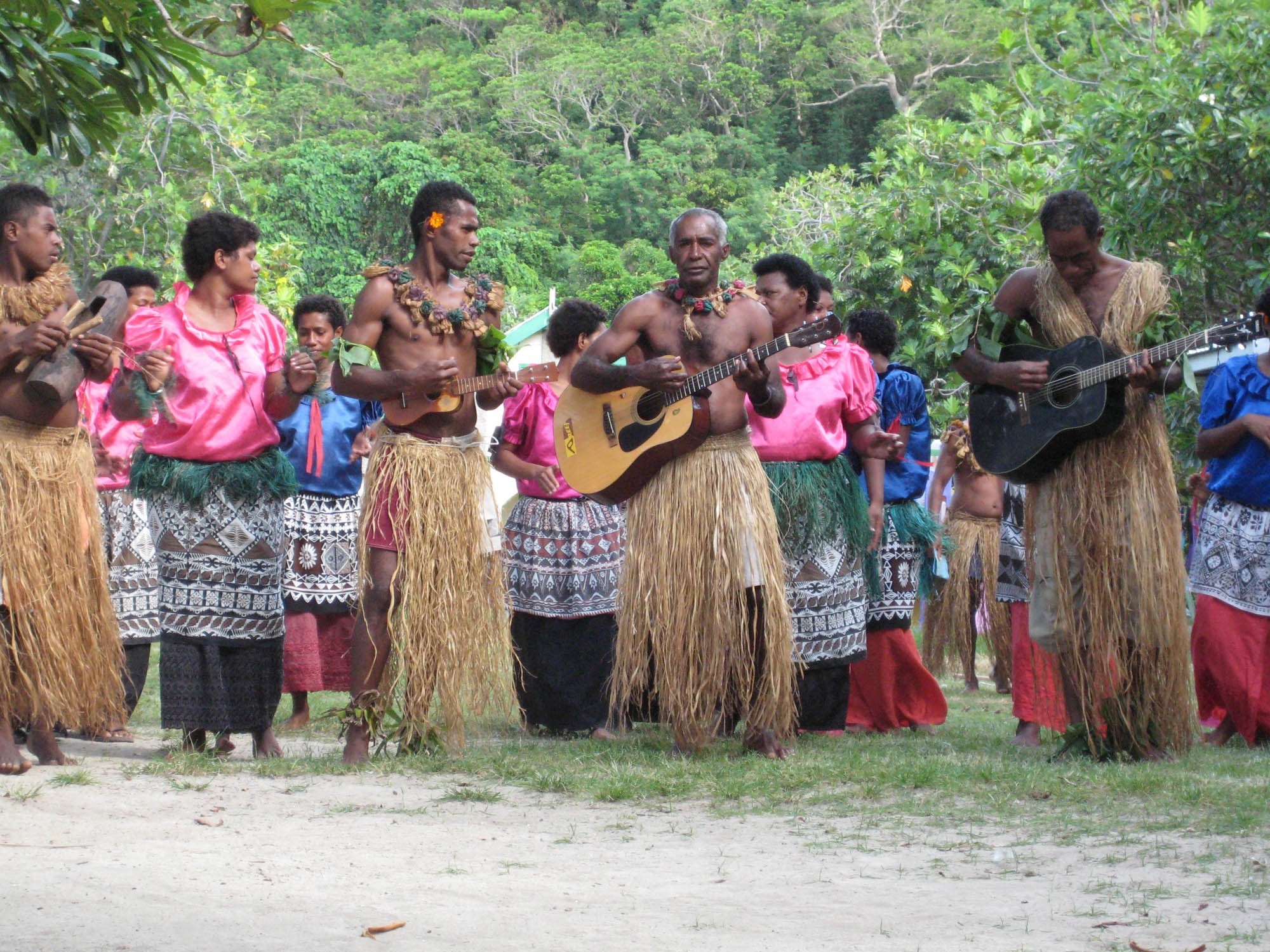
Fijians

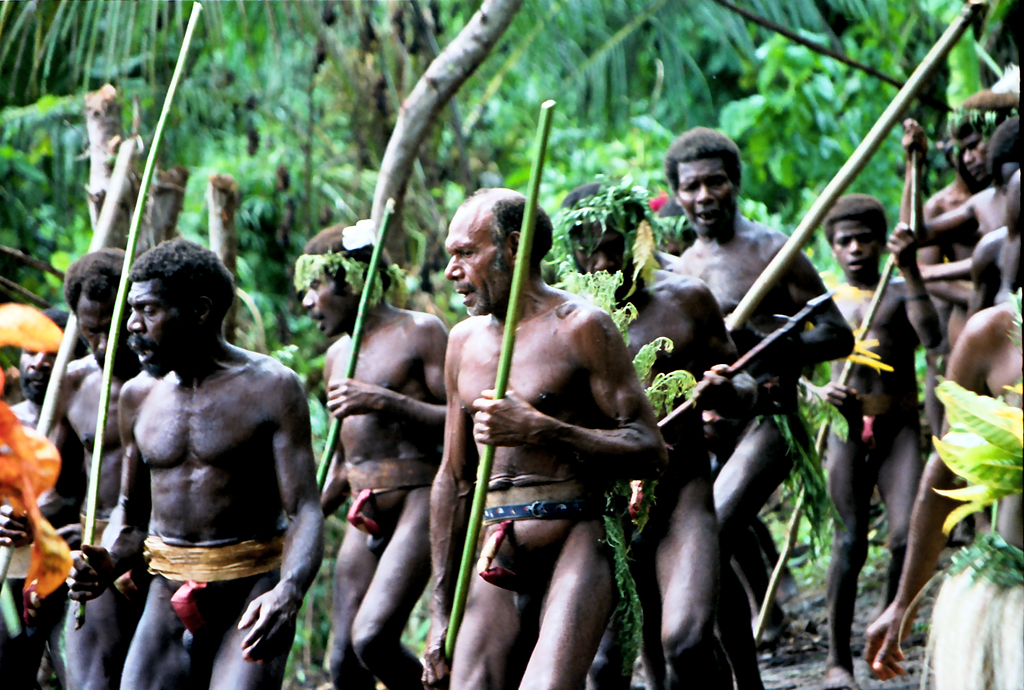
Men wearing traditional nambas during a N'gol ceremony on Pentecost Island, Vanuatu

Melanesia generally includes New Guinea and other (far-)western Pacific islands from the Arafura Sea out to Fiji. The region is mostly inhabited by the Melanesian peoples.

- Melanesians
  - Austronesian-speaking Melanesians
    - Fijians (iTaukei): Fiji
    - Kanak: New-Caledonia
    - Malaitan people: Malaita, Solomon Islands
    - Ni-Vanuatu: Vanuatu
  - Papuan-speaking Melanesians
    - Baining
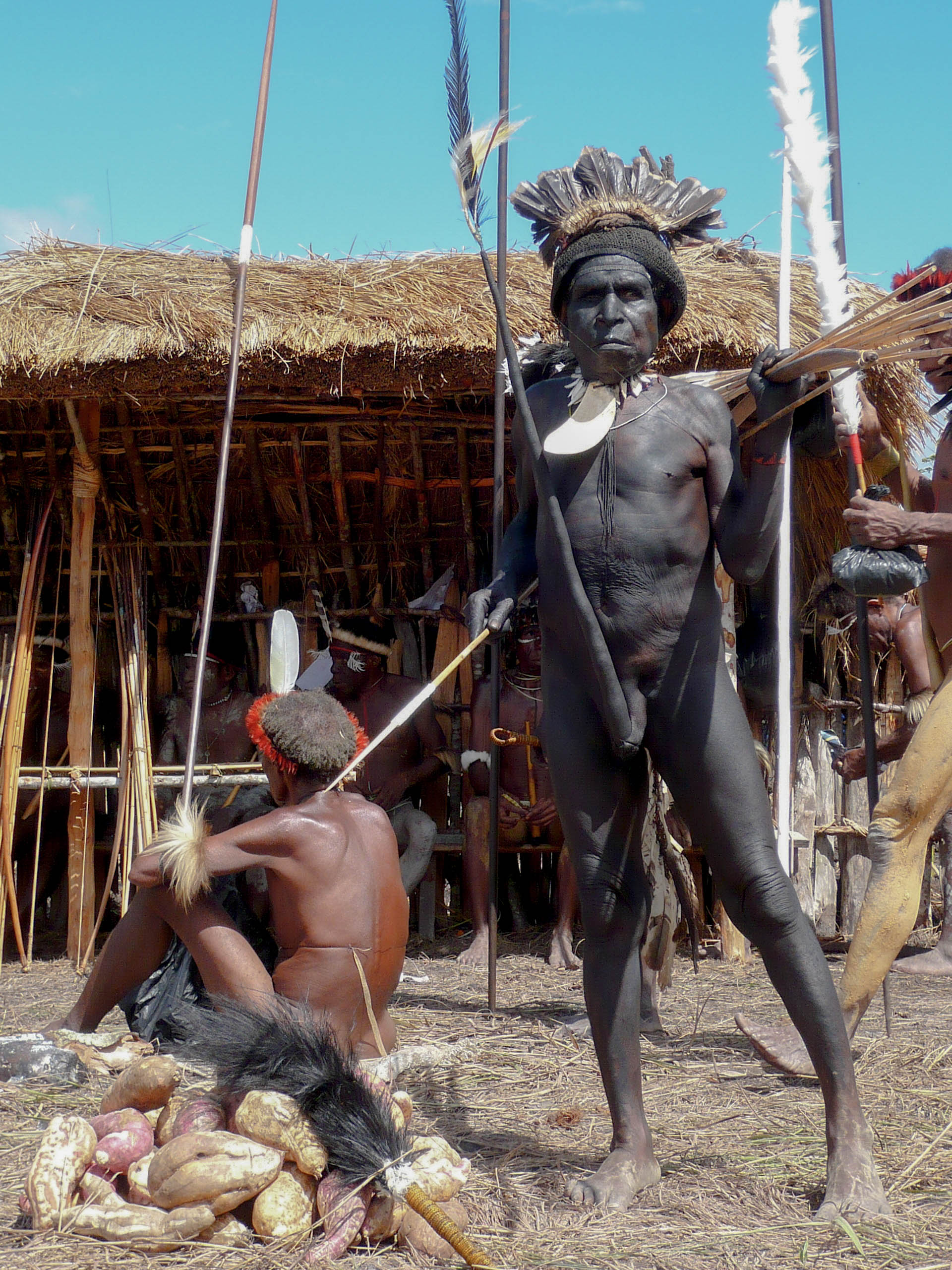
      Dani people in New Guinea
- Papuans: more than 250 distinct tribes or clans, each with their own language and culture. The main island of New Guinea and surrounding islands (territory forming independent state of Papua New Guinea (PNG) and the Indonesian provinces of West Papua and Papua). Considered "Indigenous" these people are a subject to many debates.
  - Sepik peoples
    - Kwoma: Peilungua Mountains, Papua New Guinea.
    - Iatmul: Sepik, Papua New Guinea.
    - Sepik Hill
      - Sanio
        - Hewa: Southern Highlands, PNG
  - Trans New-Guinean peoples
    - Huli of the Southern Highlands, Papua New Guinea.
    - Angu: Southwestern Morobe Province, Papua New Guinea.
    - Bosavi
      - Kaluli-Kasua
        - Kaluli: Great Papuan Plateau, PNG
    - Ok
      - Mountain Ok
        - Wopkaimin: western PNG, Star Mountains.
    - West Trans New-Guinean peoples
      - Dani: Papua, Indonesia
      - Korowai: West Papua, close to the Papua New Guinea border.
      - Asmat: Asmat Regency, West Papua.

=== Micronesia ===
Micronesia generally includes the various small island chains of the western and central Pacific. The region is mostly inhabited by the Micronesian peoples.

- Micronesians
  - Chamorro people: Northern Marianas and Guam
  - Carolinians: Northern Marianas
  - Yapese, Kosraeans, Chuukese, Pohnpeians, Palauans, Kiribati's

=== Polynesia ===
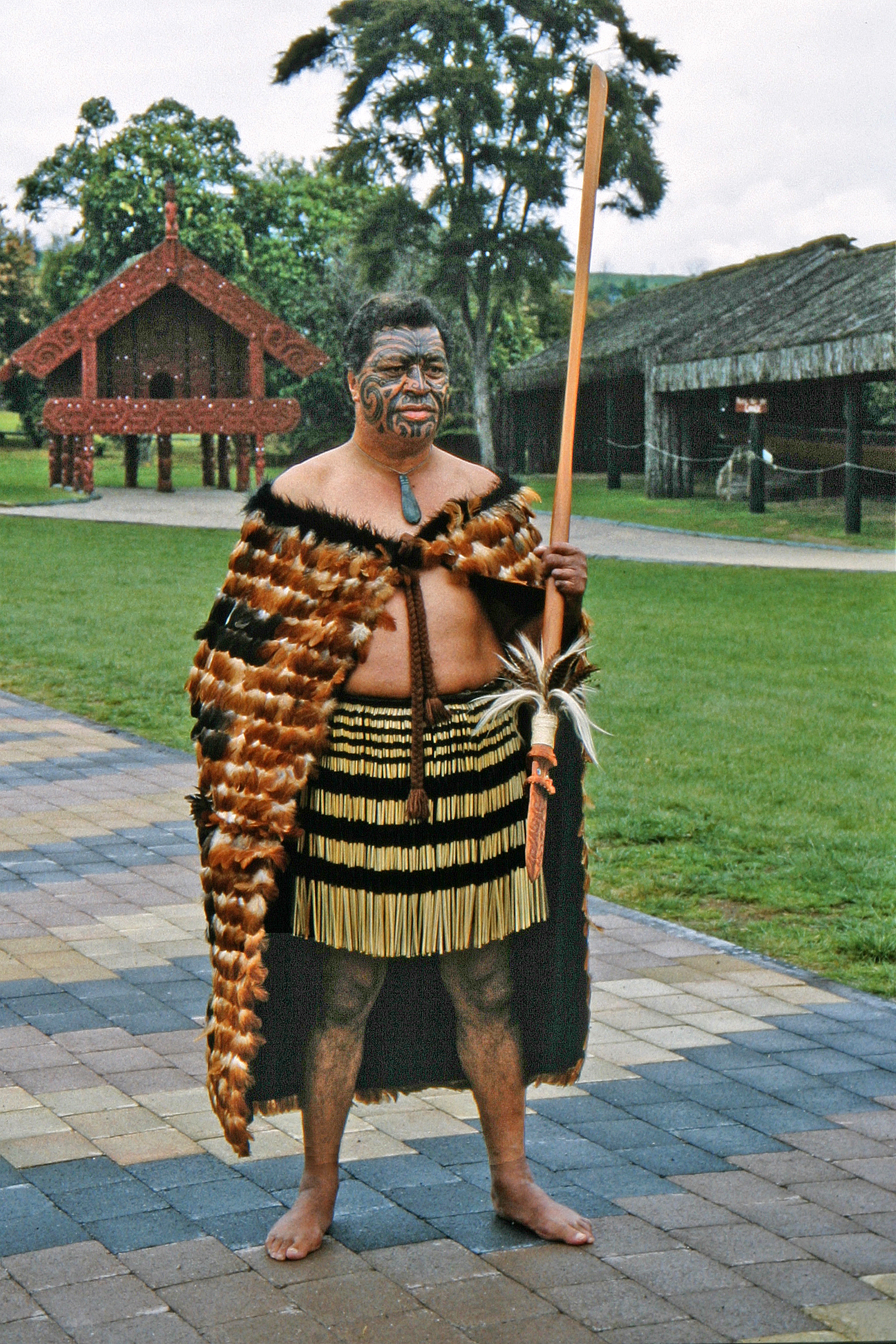
Māori man wearing a korowai and piupiu

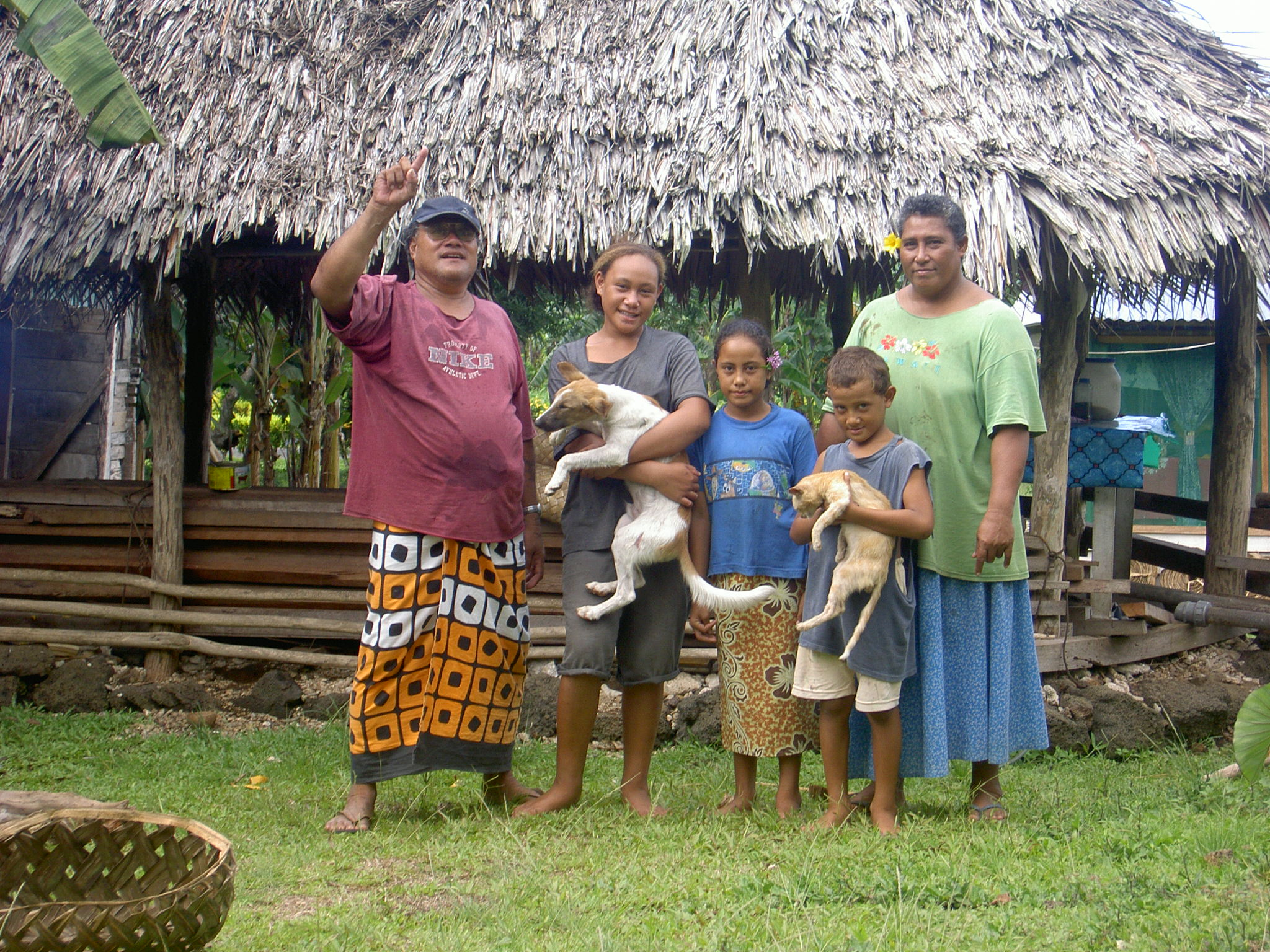
Samoan family

Polynesia includes New Zealand and the islands of Oceania, and has various Indigenous populations.

==== Polynesians ====
- Native Hawaiians
- Tongans
- Tuvaluan people
- Marquesas Islanders
- Rapanui
- Samoans
- Tokelau
- Austral Islanders
- Cook Islanders
- Maohi, Tahiti
- Māori, New Zealand
- Moriori, Chatham Islands
- Tahitians, French Polynesia
- Tuamotus
- Niueans

==== Polynesian outliers ====
- Vanuatuans (Note: The Indigenous people of Vanuatu make up more than 95 percent of a country of just under a quarter of a million people (who speak more than 111 different languages), recognized by the United Nations as simultaneously having Least Developed status and having the world's greatest cultural and linguistic diversity.)
- Kapingamarangi and Nukuoro, The Federated States of Micronesia
- Rennel, Tikopia and Vaeakau-Taumako, Solomon Islands
- Nuguria, Papua New Guinea
- Nukumanu, Papua New Guinea
- Takuu, Papua New Guinea
- Ontong Java
- Sikaiana
- Anuta, Solomon Islands
- Fagauvea, Ouvéa, New Caledonia
- Aniwa
- Bellona
- Rennel

== Circumpolar ==
Circumpolar peoples is an umbrella term for the various Indigenous peoples of the Arctic. List of peoples by ethnolinguistic grouping:

- "Paleosiberian"
  - Chukotko-Kamchatkan
    - Chukchi (Lyg'oravetl'et/O'ravetl'et): Siberia, Russian Far East, Russia
    - Koryaks (Nymylan-Chauchuven): Russian Far East
  - Tungusic
    - Evenks (Evenkil): China, Mongolia, Russia
- Eskimo–Aleut
  - Aleut (Unangax): Aleutian Islands and Kamchatka Krai
  - Eskimo/Yupik-Inuit
    - Yupik: Alaska, United States and the Russian Far East, Siberia
      - Alutiiq (Sugpiat): Alaska, United States
      - Yup'ik (Yupiat/Yupiit/Cup'ik/Cupiit): Alaska, United States
      - Cup'ig (Nunivak Cup'ig people): Nunivak Island (Alaska), United States
      - Siberian Yupik (Yupighyt): Siberia, Russia
    - Inuit: Greenland, Northern Canada (Nunavut, Nunavik and Northwest Territories), Alaska, United States
      - Inupiat (Iñupiat): Alaska's Arctic and North Slope boroughs and the Bering Straits
      - Kalaallit (Kalaallit): Greenland
- Turkic
  - Northeast Turks
    - Dolgans (Dolgan/Tya Kikhi): Siberia (Krasnoyarsk Krai), Russia
    - Yakuts (Sakha): Siberia (Sakha Republic), Russia
- Uralic
  - Ob-Ugrians: Western Siberia
    - Khanty, formerly known as Ostyaks
    - Mansi, formerly known as Voguls
  - Sami (Sámi/Saami/Lapp), formerly known as Lapps: Northern Norway, Sweden, Finland, and Kola Peninsula in Russia
  - Samoyedic peoples
    - Northern Samoyedic peoples: West Siberia and Far Northern European Russia
      - Enets: Far Northern Western Siberia, Russia
      - Nenets: Far Northern Western Siberia and Far Northern European Russia
      - Nganasan: Taymyr Peninsula, Siberia, Russia
      - Selkups: Between Ob and Yenisey Rivers in Russia
- Yukaghirs: Far Northern East Siberia, Russia
- Yeniseian peoples
  - Ket people: along the middle branch of Yenisey River

== See also ==
- Center for World Indigenous Studies
- Declaration on the Rights of Indigenous Peoples
- Indigenous peoples
- Indigenous archaeology
- Indigenous (ecology)
- Indigenous intellectual property
- Indigenous knowledge
- Indigenous language
- Indigenous medicine
- Indigenous music
- International Work Group for Indigenous Affairs
- United Nations Permanent Forum on Indigenous Issues
- World Council of Indigenous Peoples
- Working Group on Indigenous Populations
- List of contemporary ethnic groups
- Lists of people by nationality
- List of indigenous rights organizations
- See all pages that start with indigenous people or indigenous
