= Malgana language =

Pama–Nyungan language of Western Australia

Malgana
- Malkana
- Pronunciation: [ˌmal.ga.ˈna]
- Region: Shark Bay area of Western Australia
- Ethnicity: Malgana people
- Extinct: 1990s
- Revival: 1-10 (2018-19) undergoing revival
- Language family: Pama–Nyungan: Kartu; Malgana
- Dialects: Kakurtu (riverside Malgana); Ngulartu (bush Malgana)

Language codes
- ISO 639-3: vml
- Glottolog: malg1242
- AIATSIS: W18
- ELP: Malkana

Malgana, also known as Malkana (Aboriginal pronunciation: [ˌmal.ga.ˈna]), is the Aboriginal Australian language of the Malgana people of Western Australia. It is one of the Kartu languages of the Pama–Nyungan family of languages.

There is a sign in the Shire of Shark Bay that reads Yandani Gathaagudu, with under it being the English translation, "Welcome to Shark Bay".

== Geographical distribution ==
Malgana was formerly spoken in the Shark Bay peninsula and surrounding areas to the area of the Murchison River near Ajana. It may have extended as far south as Gee Gie Outcamp. Yinggarda was spoken to its north, Nhanda to its south, Wajarri to its east, and Badimaya to its southeast.

== Dialects ==
Many sources have listed languages spoken to the south of Malgana, Thaagurda, Buluguda, Damala, and Watjanti, sometimes as dialects of it. Geoffrey O'Grady, Charles F. Voegelin, and Florence M. Voegelin listed them as dialects of Malgana, with at least 71% lexical similarity, and listed all five as "communalects". Norman Tindale listed Thaagurda as an alternative name for a group of Nhanda speakers, and the other three as names for Nhanda speakers and place names.

== Classification ==
A conclusive comparison of Malgana vocabulary with other languages is impossible, as only around 330 words are known for it. It shares 46% of its vocabulary with Nhanda, 58% with Wajarri, 46% with Yinggarda, and 43% with Badimaya.

== History ==
=== Documentation ===
The first documentation of Malgana was recorded by E. T. Hooley in 1865, containing 73 words of Malgana. This was followed by Frederick Barlee's vocabulary published in Edward Micklethwaite Curr's The Australian Race in 1886. O'Grady collected a vocabulary of 90 words in 1960. Margaret Florey also documented some of Malgana in 1991 and 1992. The Irra Wangga Language Centre (having taken over from the Yamaji Language Centre) has been carrying out work on the Malgana language since 1995, carried out by Doug Marmion, and has produced an illustrated wordlist from local speakers of the language. A Sketch Grammar of Malgana (Gargett, 2012) was published by Pacific Linguistics.

== Phonology ==
=== Consonants ===
	Peripheral		Laminal		Apical	
	Labial	Velar	Dental	Palatal	Alveolar	Retroflex
Stop	b	ɡ	t̪	ɟ	d	ɖ
Nasal	m	ŋ	n̪	ɲ	n	ɳ
Lateral			l̪	ʎ	l	ɭ
Rhotic					ɹ	ɽ
Approximant	w			j		

=== Vowels ===
	Front	Back
High	i iː	u uː
Low	a aː	
