= The Furnace (2020 film) =

- Theatrical Poster
- Directed by: Roderick MacKay
- Written by: Roderick MacKay
- Produced by: Tim White; Tenille Kennedy
- Starring: Ahmed Malek; Baykali Ganambarr; David Wenham
- Cinematography: Michael McDermott; Bonnie Elliot
- Edited by: Merlin Eden
- Music by: Mark Bradshaw
- Production companies: Southern Light Films; The Koop Production; Meaning Maker
- Distributed by: Umbrella Entertainment (Australia); Arclight Films (internationally).
- Release date: September 2020 (Venice)
- Running time: 116 minutes
- Country: Australia
- Language: English

The Furnace is a 2020 Australian adventure drama film written and directed by Roderick MacKay. Set in the Western Australian outback during the goldrushes of the 1890s, the film's characters include "Afghan" cameleers, a white gold thief, and local Aboriginal people. It was nominated for several AACTA Awards.

== Synopsis ==
The film is set during the Western Australian gold rushes of the 1890s, and its characters represent some of the "Afghan" cameleers (who actually came from India, Persia, and other parts of the Middle East, and belonged to Islamic, Sikh and Hindu faiths) who brought their camel trains to help open up the Australian outback from the mid-19th century. Two young Afghan cameleers, Hanif and Jundah, form a friendship with an Aboriginal hunter, Woorak. Hanif is trying to find an illegal furnace so that he can melt two bars of stolen gold, which he acquired by chance after coming across Mal, the sole survivor of a group massacre. The two men have to compromise in order to survive the journey through the arid outback, while evading capture by Gold Squad officers.

== Cast ==
- Ahmed Malek as Hanif
- Baykali Ganambarr as Woorak
- Kaushik Das as Jundah
- Noah Skape as younger man
- Andrew Hale as older man
- David Wenham as Mal
- Samson Coulter as Trooper Sam
- Erik Thomson as Corporal Briggs
- Graham Boyce as prospector
- Jay Ryan as Sergeant Shaw
- Steve McCall as Trooper Fergal
- Wakarra Gondarra as Mandu
- Peter Jones as Mandu's son
- Gregory Shar as Juney
- Latrell Curley as Boolgie
- Trevor Jamieson as Coobering
- Sean Choolburra as The Tracker
- Goran D. Kleut as Yates
- Mahesh Jadu as Sadhu
- Osamah Sami as Majid
- Daniel Motearefi as Kourosh
- Evan Williams as Water Wagon Teamster

== Production ==
The film was directed by Roderick MacKay, his debut as director. It was produced by Tim White and Tenille Kennedy.

Several of the Aboriginal actors speak their Badimaya language, one of many Aboriginal Australian languages which are endangered. It was filmed in Yamatji country in what is now known as the Mid West region, in the Shire of Mount Magnet (Badimaya) and Kalbarri (Nhanda).

The Furnace was produced by Southern Light Films, Meaning Maker and The Koop, and distributed in Australia and New Zealand by Umbrella Films and internationally by Arclight Films.

== Release ==
The Furnace premiered at the 77th Venice Film Festival in September 2020, the only Australian film selected for the festival.

== Reception ==
On review aggregator website Rotten Tomatoes, the film has an approval rating of 89% based on 18 critics, with an average rating of 7.1/10. David Stratton wrote "If the film has a flaw it's that it doesn't quite reach the satisfying climax it promises; it's beautiful, even powerful, but rather bleak". According to Jake Wilson of The Age, "MacKay is not lacking in talent, but for a first-time director he may have taken on a little too much. While the scattered quality of the storytelling may be partly deliberate, a bigger problem is the lack of consistent tone".

Writing for The Hollywood Reporter David Rooney commented that the film "Smolders effectively, even if it doesn't quite achieve maximum heat". Xan Brooks of The Guardian called The Furnace "as tough as old leather and as unadorned as cow hide", while Variety's Jay Weissberg called the film "An enjoyably absorbing experience". Lance Bakare wrote in The Guardian that he hoped that the film would help to highlight some forgotten history of Australia, giving the film 4 out of 5 stars.

=== Accolades ===
Award	Category	Subject	Result
AACTA Awards (11th)	Best Film	Tenille Kennedy and Tim White	Nominated
AACTA Awards (11th)	Best Direction	Roderick MacKay	Nominated
AACTA Awards (11th)	Best Original Screenplay	Roderick MacKay	Nominated
AACTA Awards (11th)	Best Actor	Ahmed Malek	Nominated
AACTA Awards (11th)	Best Supporting Actor	Baykali Ganambarr	Nominated
AWGIE Awards (54th)	Best Screenplay, Feature Film – Original	Roderick MacKay	Nominated
