= Charmaine Papertalk Green =

Australian Indigenous artist and poet (1962–2025)

- Born: 1962 Eradu, Western Australia, Australia
- Died: 27 August 2025 (aged 63) Western Australia, Australia
- Occupation: Poet, visual and installation artist
- Language: English, Badimaya and Wajarri
- Notable works: Nganajungu Yagu
- Notable awards: Victorian Premier's Prize for Poetry, 2020; Western Australian Women's Hall of Fame, 2023

Charmaine Papertalk Green Smith (1962 – 27 August 2025) was an Australian Indigenous poet. As Charmaine Green she worked as a visual and installation artist.

== Background ==
Green was a Yamaji woman, born in 1962 at Eradu near Geraldton in Western Australia.

Green died on the Whadjuk boodja (country) on 27 August 2025, at the age of 63.

== Career ==
=== Poetry ===
A number of her poems were included in Those Who Remain Will Always Remember: An Anthology of Aboriginal Writing.

Her work was included in The New Oxford Book of Australian Verse (3rd edition), while her 2019 poetry collection, Nganajungu Yagu, won the 2020 Victorian Premier's Prize for Poetry. Green won the 2020 ALS Gold Medal for Nganajungu Yagu and was shortlisted in 2019 for False Claims of Colonial Thieves. In the 2020 Queensland Premier's Literary Awards, Judith Wright Calanthe Prize for Poetry, she was shortlisted for Nganajungu Yagu.

Her 2018 book False Claims of Colonial Thieves, co-written with John Kinsella, was shortlisted for the John Bray Poetry Award at the 2020 Adelaide Festival Awards for Literature. In his 2018 review, Robert Wood wrote: "As a critique of colonial Australia and a historical document, False Claims of Colonial Thieves has a certain weight and importance". She and Kinsella were interviewed by Claire Nichols for The Book Show on ABC Radio National.

In 2023 Green won the Red Room Poetry Fellowship, valued at $5,000 plus a two-week residency at Bundanon. Her nominated work is Jugarnu Wangga Migamanmanha (Older woman making talk). With co-author John Kinsella, she was shortlisted for the 2023 ALS Gold Medal for ART.

On International Women's Day in 2023, Green was inducted into the Western Australian Women's Hall of Fame.

=== Art ===
Green won the poster competition at the NAIDOC Awards in 2006. She was represented by Yamaji Art Centre, Geraldton.

== Works ==
- Papertalk Green, Charmaine (2007). Just Like That and Other Poems. Fremantle Arts Centre Press. ISBN 9781921064128.
- —— (2014). Tiptoeing Tracker Tod. Oxford University Press. ISBN 9780195524413.
- ——; Kinsella, John (2018). False Claims of Colonial Thieves. Magabala Books. ISBN 9781925360813.
- —— (2019). Nganajungu Yagu. Cordite Books. ISBN 9780648511601.
- ——; Kinsella, John (2022). ART. Magabala Books. ISBN 9781922613738.
