= Nokaan =

The Nokaan or Nhugarn were an Aboriginal Australian people of the Mid West region of Western Australia.

== Country ==
The Nokaan dwelt on the plateau west of the Murchison, at least as far south from Curbur to Yallalong and Coolcalaya. Their inland extension to the south went close to Northampton. According to Norman Tindale, who estimated their lands as embracing about 4,700 square miles (12,000 km^{2}) of territory, they pushed into the coastal strip only relatively recently after the onset of contact with white settlers.

Running clock-wise from north, their neighbours were the Malgana, Watjarri, Widi, then the Amangu south, and the Nanda directly east.

== Alternative names ==
- Noga:n (Malgana exonym)
- Nagadja (easterners, an Amangu exonym for circumcised tribes lying to the east of Geraldton)
- Nagodja (a Watjarri exonym)
- Ngadja
- Akadja, Akady, Akadi
- Wiludjanu (another Watjarri language-denoting exonym, signifying 'western talk')

== Sources ==
- "AIATSIS map of Indigenous Australia". AIATSIS. 14 May 2024.
- "Tindale Tribal Boundaries" (PDF). Department of Aboriginal Affairs, Western Australia. September 2016. Archived from the original (PDF) on 8 March 2016.
- Tindale, Norman Barnett (1974). "Nokaan (WA)". Aboriginal Tribes of Australia: Their Terrain, Environmental Controls, Distribution, Limits, and Proper Names. Australian National University Press. ISBN 978-0-708-10741-6. Archived from the original on 20 March 2020.
- Walcott, P. (1863). "A Short Vocabulary of Aboriginal Words, Collected at Nichol Bay". Transactions of the Ethnological Society of London. 2: 249–251. doi:10.2307/3014322. JSTOR 3014322.
