= Nhanhagardi language =

Indigenous language in Western Australia

Nhanhagardi
- Nanakarti, Wilunyu
- Native to: Western Australia
- Region: Champion Bay
- Ethnicity: Nhanda?
- Extinct: by 1975
- Revival: 2020s
- Language family: Pama–Nyungan: Kartu?; Nhanda; Nhanhagardi

Language codes
- ISO 639-3: xnk
- Glottolog: None
- AIATSIS: A93 Nhanagardi, W43 Pulinya

The Nhanhagardi language, also written Nana karti, Nanakarti, Nanakarri, Nanakari, and Nanakati, and also known as Wilunyu, Wiri, Minangu, Barimaia and Jaburu (meaning "northern peoples"), is an Aboriginal Australian language of the Champion Bay area of Western Australia.

No speakers of the language have been recorded since 1975 and through successive Australian censuses up to 2016. According to Vaso Elefsiniotis of the Irra Wangga Language Centre, Nhanhagardi usually refers to the traditional language and people of Champion Bay.

There was some doubt about its existence and classification, but as of 2020, its status is confirmed on AIATSIS.

According to Clarrie Cameron, who is of Nhanhagardi descent, "Pulinya" (AIATSIS W43) is an old name for Nhanhagardi, but Ethnologue equates it with the Yinggarda language. Cameron also says that Nhanhagardi is a Nhanda (S14) language.

== Language revival ==
As of 2020, "Wilunyu (also known as Nhanhagardi)" is one of 20 languages prioritised as part of the Priority Languages Support Project, being undertaken by First Languages Australia and funded by the Department of Communications and the Arts. The project aims to "identify and document critically-endangered languages — those languages for which little or no documentation exists, where no recordings have previously been made, but where there are living speakers".
