= Calytrix purpurea =

Conservation status
- Priority Two — Poorly Known Taxa (DEC)

Scientific classification
- Kingdom: Plantae
- Clade: Tracheophytes
- Clade: Angiosperms
- Clade: Eudicots
- Clade: Rosids
- Order: Myrtales
- Family: Myrtaceae
- Genus: Calytrix
- Species: C. purpurea

Binomial name
- Calytrix purpurea (F.Muell.) Craven

Synonyms
- Lhotskya purpurea F.Muell.; Lhotzkya purpurea F.Muell. orth. var.

Species of flowering plant

Calytrix purpurea is a species of flowering plant in the myrtle family Myrtaceae and is endemic to the south-west of Western Australia. It is a spreading shrub with linear leaves and purple flowers with a yellow base, and about 45 to 55 yellow stamens in four rows.

== Description ==
Calytrix purpurea is a spreading shrub that typically grows to a height of 30–60 cm (12–24 in). Its leaves are linear, 3–10 mm (0.12–0.39 in) long and 0.6–1 mm (0.024–0.039 in) wide on a petiole 0.5–1.0 mm (0.020–0.039 in) long. There are no stipules at the base of the petiole. The flowers are borne on a peduncle 5.5–8.0 mm (0.22–0.31 in) long with elliptic to egg-shaped lobes with the narrower end towards the base, 3–5 mm (0.12–0.20 in) long. The floral tube is narrowly conical, about 5 mm (0.20 in) long and has 10 ribs. The sepals are fused at the base, with egg-shaped, the narrower end towards the base, to oblong lobes 0.5–0.6 mm (0.020–0.024 in) long and 1.25–1.40 mm (0.049–0.055 in) wide. The petals are purple with a yellow base, egg-shaped, 7.5–8.5 mm (0.30–0.33 in) long and 3.0–3.75 mm (0.118–0.148 in) wide, and there are about 45 to 55 yellow stamens in four rows, and that turn deep dirty cream-coloured as they age. Flowering occurs in September and October.

== Taxonomy ==
This species was first formally described in 1859 by Ferdinand von Mueller who gave it the name Lhotskya purpurea in his Fragmenta Phytographiae Australiae from specimens collected near Champion Bay by Augustus Oldfield. In 1987, Lyndley Craven transferred the species to Calytrix as C. purpurea. The specific epithet (purpurea) means 'purple'.

== Distribution and habitat ==
Calytrix purpurea grows on sand plains and sand dunes in coastal heath and in Melaleuca scrub in the Kalbarri district and the Champion Bay district in the Avon Wheatbelt and Geraldton Sandplains bioregions in the south-west of Western Australia.

== Conservation status ==
Calytrix purpurea is listed as "Priority Two" by the Western Australian Government Department of Biodiversity, Conservation and Attractions, meaning that it is poorly known and from only one or a few locations.
