= WBV =

WBV, or wbv, may refer to:

- Whole body vibration, a generic term used when vibrations of any frequency are transferred to the human body
- wbv, the ISO 639-3 code for the Wajarri language in Murchison, Western Australia
