= Acacia multispicata =

Spiked wattle

Scientific classification
- Kingdom: Plantae
- Clade: Tracheophytes
- Clade: Angiosperms
- Clade: Eudicots
- Clade: Rosids
- Order: Fabales
- Family: Fabaceae
- Subfamily: Caesalpinioideae
- Clade: Mimosoid clade
- Genus: Acacia
- Species: A. multispicata

Binomial name
- Acacia multispicata Benth.
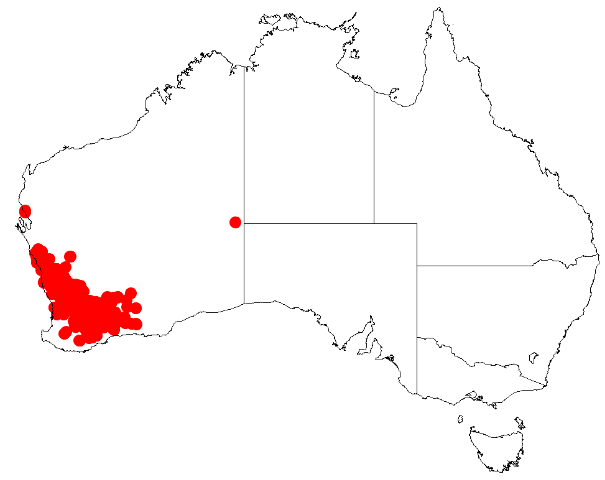
- Occurrence data from AVH

Synonyms
- Racosperma multispicatum (Benth.) Pedley; Acacia ephedroides auct. non Benth.: Bentham, G. (5 October 1864); Acacia ephedroides auct. non Benth.: Diels, F.L.E. & Pritzel, E.G. (6 December 1904); Acacia microneura auct. non Meisn.: Diels, F.L.E. & Pritzel, E.G. (6 December 1904)

Species of legume

Habit in a Nature Reserve near Mukinbudin

Acacia multispicata is a species of flowering plant in the family Fabaceae, and is endemic to the south-west of Western Australia. It is a shrub with terete to compressed phyllodes, oblong to cylindrical heads of golden yellow flowers, and linear pods strongly raised over and constricted between the seeds.

== Description ==
Acacia multispicata is a rather dense, spreading, commonly rounded shrub that typically grows to a height of 0.4–2.5 m (1 ft 4 in – 8 ft 2 in) and has many stems, its branchlets glabrous or with a few soft hairs pressed against the surface. Its phyllodes are terete to compressed, occasionally flat and linear, straight to slightly curved, mostly 20–70 mm (0.79–2.76 in) long, 0.8–1.5 mm (0.031–0.059 in) wide with a pointed or often hooked, more or less rigid tip, and three to many veins on each face. The flowers are borne in loosely oblong to cylindrical heads, 8–15 mm (0.31–0.59 in) long and sessile or on peduncles up to 2 mm (0.079 in) long. Flowering occurs from August to October, but has been recorded in March, April, June and July, and the pods are linear, up to 80 mm (3.1 in) long and 3–4 mm (0.12–0.16 in) wide, thinly crusty and strongly raised over and constricted between the seeds. The seeds are elliptic, 3–4 mm (0.12–0.16 in) long, dull to shining black with an aril on the end.

== Taxonomy ==
Acacia multispicata was fist formally described in 1864 by George Bentham in his Flora Australiensis from specimens collected by Roe, Drummond and Oldfield. The specific epithet (multispicata) means 'many-spikes'.

== Distribution and habitat ==
This species of wattle is widespread from Ajana, south to Cranbrook and east to Queen Victoria Rock about 45 km (28 mi) south-south-west of Coolgardie and Frank Hann National Park, in the Avon Wheatbelt, Coolgardie, Esperance Plains, Geraldton Sandplains, Jarrah Forest, Mallee, Swan Coastal Plain and Yalgoo bioregions, where it grows in yellow sandy soils in heath, scrub and shrublands.

== See also ==
- List of Acacia species
