= Badimaya language =

Aboriginal language of Western Australia

Badimaya
- Badimia
- Native to: Australia
- Region: Murchison area of Western Australia
- Ethnicity: Badimaya, Widi
- Extinct: 2018
- Revival
- Language family: Pama–Nyungan: Kartu; Badimaya
- Dialects: Northern; Southern

Language codes
- ISO 639-3: bia
- Glottolog: badi1246
- AIATSIS: A14
- ELP: Badimaya

Badimaya (sometimes written Badimia) is an Australian Aboriginal language. It is a member of the Kartu subgroup of the Pama–Nyungan family, spoken by the Badimaya people of the Mid West region of Western Australia.

The last fluent speaker of Badimaya died in 2018. However, there is a passionate movement of language revival underway in the Badimaya community.

== Geographic distribution ==
Badimaya was traditionally spoken across a large region spanning Lake Moore, Ninghan Station, Paynes Find and Dalwallinu in the south, to Mount Magnet, Wynyangoo Station and Kirkalocka Station in the north.

Today Badimaya people live across the Mid West region, (Note: Traditionally the region is known as the Murchison.) based in regional towns and communities including Mount Magnet, Geraldton, Yalgoo, Mullewa, Meekatharra, Wubin, Dalwallinu and Perth.

Traditional Badimaya country is bordered by Western Desert language (Tjuparn, Wanmala) to the east, Noongar to the south-west and Wajarri to the north-west.

== Varieties ==
Analysis of the lexicon and grammatical features of the language suggests that there were (at least) two varieties of Badimaya, a northern and southern variety. These varieties are unnamed; however, Badimaya speakers are aware of differences in the speech of Badimaya people from different regions of Badimaya country.

Widi, also referred to as Wiri (not to be confused with the Wiri language of Queensland) and a variety of other names, may be a dialect of Badimaya, but its status is unclear.

== Language resources ==
The Bundiyarra Irra Wangga Language Centre (and previously the Yamaji Language Centre) has been carrying out work on the Badimaya language since 1993. A sketch grammar of Badimaya was published by Leone Dunn in 1988, and a Badimaya-English dictionary (2014), illustrated topical dictionary (2014) and several children's books were published by Bundiyarra Irra Wangga Language Centre. The last fluent speaker of Badimaya, Mt Magnet elder Ollie George, undertook significant language documentation work between the early 1990s and 2018, in collaboration with Bundiyarra Irra Wangga Language Centre.

An art and language project, Nganang Badimaya Wangga, was collaboratively produced in 2017 by the Irra Wangga Language Centre, with artists from Yamaji Art and Wirnda Barna Artists. The project produced a book of more than 20 stories of Ollie's life entitled Nganang Badimaya Wangga: Yarns with Gami Ollie George, a short video about Ollie by ABC Open Producer Chris Lewis, and an exhibition of the artworks created for the project.

== Phonology ==
=== Consonants ===
	Peripheral		Laminal		Apical	
	Labial	Velar	Dental	Palatal	Alveolar	Retroflex
Plosive	b ⟨b⟩	g ⟨g⟩	d̪ ⟨dh⟩	ɟ ~ ɟ͡ʝ ⟨dy⟩	d ⟨d⟩	ɖ ⟨rd⟩
Nasal	m	ŋ ⟨ng⟩	n̪ ⟨nh⟩	ɲ ⟨ny⟩	n	ɳ ⟨rn⟩
Lateral			l̪ ⟨lh⟩	ʎ ⟨ly⟩	l	ɭ ⟨rl⟩
Tap					ɾ ⟨rr⟩	
Approximant	w			j ⟨y⟩		ɻ ⟨r⟩

The laminal stops /d̪/ and /ɟ/ are very frequently realised intervocalically as fricatives, [ð] and [ʝ] respectively. The latter is usually released with a degree of affrication. The degree of retroflexion for /ɖ/, /ɳ/, and /ɭ/ differs depending on the preceding vowel, being most extreme following /a/.

Unlike in many neighbouring languages, there is evidence for a dental/palatal contrast in Badimaya. On the basis of data collected, there is no evidence to suggest any patterns of complementary distribution between dental and palatal laminals in relation to front and back vowels, as is the case in Pitjantjatjara. There is also no evidence in the data to suggest neutralisation of the laminal contrast word-initially due to the presence of a laminal later in the word, as is the case in Diyari.

=== Vowels ===
Badimaya has a three vowel system consisting of /a/, /i/, /u/.

Allophones
Phoneme	Allophone
/a/	[ɒ], [ɔ], [ʌ], [ə], [ɛ]
/i/	[ɪ], word-initially
/u/	[ʊ], [o]

=== Restrictions on phoneme positions ===
The vowels /u/ and /a/ do not appear word-initially. The high front vowel /i/ is the only vowel found word-initially, but this can also be analysed as a reduction of /ji/, with an initial consonant.

Constraints on the distribution of consonants are as follows:

- Every Badimaya consonant can appear intervocalically.
- Only peripheral and laminal consonants can appear word-initially.
- Only nasals, laterals, the stops /d/ and /g/, and the alveolar tap or trill /ɾ/ can appear word-finally.

The above rules are identical to how they were recorded by Leone Dunn (1988), except for the appearance of /ɾ/ word-finally, which Dunn did not observe, and may have misidentified when it did occur.

== Typology ==
Badimaya is typologically fairly standard of Western Australian Pama-Nyungan languages. It has a phoneme inventory typical of Pama-Nyungan languages, with six places of articulation (showing both a laminal and apical contrast) and a three-way vowel system, with (limited) length-contrast.

Badimaya is a suffixing language with fairly free word order. It has a split-ergative case marking system, consistent with neighbouring languages. Unlike neighbouring languages however, Badimaya does not show evidence for a bound pronominal system.

== Grammar ==
=== Pronominal system ===
Pronouns are of the form: person+number+case. The third person displays person allomorphy conditioned by number. There are morphological distinctions in the first and second person for the dual number, but this distinction is not found in the third person in the southern dialect. The pronominal forms of the southern dialect of Badimaya are listed below:

Personal pronouns
Person	Number	Absolutive	Accusative	Locative	Dative	Allative
1	Singular	ngadhu	ngadhunha	ngadhula	nganang	nganangudi
1	Dual	ngalidya	ngalidyanha	ngalidyala	ngalidyang	
1	Plural	ngalimi	ngaliminha	ngalimila	ngalimi	ngalimidi
2	Singular	nhundu	nhununha	nhundula	nhunung	nhunungudi
2	Dual	nhuradya nhubadya nhubali	nhuranha	nhurala	nhubadyang nhurang	nhurangudi
2	Plural	nhurami	nhuraminha	nhurangula		
3	Singular	balu	balunha	balula	balung	balungudi baludi
3	Plural	dhanha	dhanhanha	dhanhala	dhanhung	dhanhungudi

There are two demonstrative pronouns a proximal (nhinha) and a distal (banha) which are declined as follows. The ablative case is formed by adding a suffix to both the ablative ending (-ngun) and the word gardi 'side.'

Demonstrative pronouns
Case	Proximate	Distal
Case	nhinha	banha
Absolutive	nhinha	banha
Ergative	nhinhalu	banhalu
Accusative	nhinhanha	banhanha
Dative	nhinhawu	banhawu
Locative	nhinhala	banhala
Allative	nhinhadi	banhadi
Ablative	nhinhagardi(ngun)	banhagardi(ngun)

There are four interrogative proforms, the nominal referring of which have case paradigms for the absolutive, ergative, locative and dative cases. The dative case has a possessive function.

Interrogative pronouns
	Absolutive	Ergative	Locative	Dative
ngana 'who'	ngana 'who'	nganalu 'who'		nganawu 'whose'
nha 'what'	nha 'what	nhalu 'what'	nhala 'on what' nhangga 'when'	nhawu 'why'
wandi 'where/which'	wandi 'which/where'		wandila 'whereabouts'	
ya 'how'				
