= Widi people =

Indigenous people of Western Australia

The Widi were an Aboriginal Australian people of the Mid West region of Western Australia.

== Country ==
The Widi were native to the area between Galup and Lake Moore. To the north, they were present around Yuin, Talleringa Peak, and Nalbarra. Their western confines ran to Mullewa and Morawa. Their eastern limits lay at Paynes Find and Wogarno, south of Mount Magnet. Yalgoo and the upper Greenough River were also part of Widi territory. Norman Tindale suggested that their tribal lands spread over about 13,800 square miles (36,000 km^{2}).

== Reputation ==
According to evidence taken at Lake Darlot, the Widi had a certain reputation for savagery even among tribes far to their west.

== Social organization and customs ==
The Widi made both circumcision and subincision an integral part of their initiation ceremonies.

== Alternative names ==
- Wiri (wiri signifies 'no')
- Minango ('southerners' Watjarri exonym)
- Minangu
- Nanakari (Nokaan exonym)
- Nanakati ('my people')
- Barimaia (Watjarri exonym denoting both the Widi and the Badimaya)
- Jaburu ("northerners", perhaps a Ballardong term)

== Sources ==
- "AIATSIS map of Indigenous Australia". AIATSIS. 14 May 2024.
- "Tindale Tribal Boundaries" (PDF). Department of Aboriginal Affairs, Western Australia. September 2016. Archived from the original (PDF) on 8 March 2016.
- Spencer, Baldwin (1914). Native tribes of the Northern Territory of Australia (PDF). London: Macmillan Publishers.
- Tindale, Norman Barnett (1974). "Widi (WA)". Aboriginal Tribes of Australia: Their Terrain, Environmental Controls, Distribution, Limits, and Proper Names. Australian National University Press. ISBN 978-0-708-10741-6. Archived from the original on 20 March 2020.
