= Thaagurda language =

Australian Aboriginal language

Thaagurda
- Daguda, Nugan
- Native to: Australia
- Region: Murchison area of Western Australia
- Ethnicity: Thaagurda
- Extinct: 2000s
- Language family: Pama–Nyungan: Kartu; Malgana?; Thaagurda

Language codes
- ISO 639-3: None (mis)
- Glottolog: None
- AIATSIS: W15

Thaagurda (sometimes written Daguda, also called Nugan) is an Australian Aboriginal language in the Mid West region of Western Australia.

It is a member of the Kartu subgroup of the Pama–Nyungan family. According to Marmion (1996), the language has no speakers or individuals who identify with this group as their ethnicity, and there were only a few elderly people who recalled the name and some sentences from the language. This information was, however, sufficient to indicate that Thaagurda was likely a distinct language from its neighbours Nhanda, Malgana and Wajarri.

== Sources ==
- Marmion, Douglas. 1996. A description of the morphology of Wajarri. Unpublished Hons. thesis, University of New England.
