= W15 =

W15 may refer to:

- British NVC community W15, a woodland community in the British National Vegetation Classification system
- London Buses route W15
- Mercedes W15, a Formula One car
- Mercedes-Benz W15, a family car
- Swanson W-15 Coupe, a light aircraft
- Thaagurda language
- Truncated cuboctahedron
- W15 warhead, a nuclear missile warhead
- Workhorse W-15, an electric pickup truck prototype
- London W15, a fictitious borough of West London in the TV series Family Affairs
