= Acacia roycei =

Scientific classification
- Kingdom: Plantae
- Clade: Tracheophytes
- Clade: Angiosperms
- Clade: Eudicots
- Clade: Rosids
- Order: Fabales
- Family: Fabaceae
- Subfamily: Caesalpinioideae
- Clade: Mimosoid clade
- Genus: Acacia
- Species: A. roycei

Binomial name
- Acacia roycei Maslin
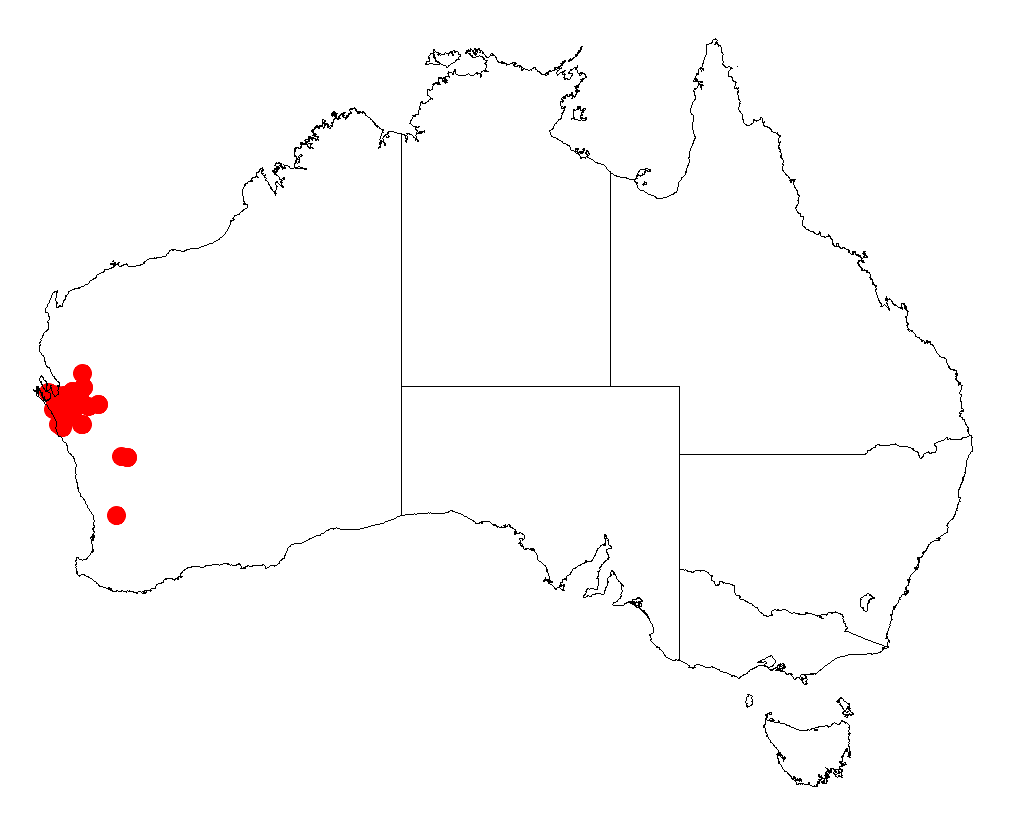
- Occurrence data from AVH

Synonyms
- Racosperma roycei

Species of legume

Acacia roycei is a shrub or tree of the genus Acacia and the subgenus Plurinerves endemic to an area of western Australia.

== Description ==
The dense shrub or tree typically grows to a height of 1 to 6 metres (3 to 20 ft) with usually hairy branchlets that have pale yellow new shoots. Like most species of Acacia it has phyllodes rather than true leaves. The rigid, grey–green and cylindrical phyllodes are straight to slightly curved with a length of 4 to 8 cm (1.6 to 3.1 in) and a diameter of 1 to 1.5 mm (0.039 to 0.059 in) with 12 to 16 close, slightly raised nerves. It blooms from August to October and produces yellow flowers. The simple inflorescences occur singly or in pairs on the axils and have spherical flower–heads with a diameter of 5 to 6 mm (0.20 to 0.24 in) and contain 55 to 75 densely packed golden coloured flowers. The glabrous, chartaceous, yellow brown to plae brown seed pods that form after flowering are raised over seeds and slightly constricted between each seed and are strongly curved with a length of up to 5 cm (2.0 in) and are 4 to 5 mm (0.16 to 0.20 in) wide.

== Taxonomy ==
The species was first formally described by the botanist Bruce Maslin in 1977 as a part of the work Studies in the genus Acacia (Mimosaceae) Miscellany as published in the journal Nuytsia. It was reclassified in 2003 by Leslie Pedley as Racosperma roycei then transferred back to genus Acacia in 2006.

== Distribution ==
It is native to an area in the Mid West, Gascoyne and Wheatbelt regions of Western Australia where it is commonly situated on sandplains growing in sandy or sandy–loam soils. The range of the plant extends from Ajana in the south to around Towrana Station in the north to the south of Gascoyne Junction where it is commonly a part of closed Acacia scrubland communities.

== See also ==
- List of Acacia species
