= Amangu =

Indigenous people of Western Australia

The Amangu are an indigenous Yamatji people of the mid-western region of Western Australia.

== Language ==
Two early glossaries of some words from the Champion Bay Amangu were collected. One, by R. J. Foley, was published in a work by Augustus Oldfield in 1865, and the other was gathered by the Colonial Secretary of Western Australia Roger Goldsworthy, and published by E. M. Curr two decades later.

== Country ==
The Amangu's territory stretched over some 26,200 square kilometres (10,100 sq mi), centring on the area of Champion Bay. The northern boundary is around Chapman River and southern Geraldton. The southern boundary extends to Hill River. The inland extension was from the coast as far as the vicinity of Mullewa, Morawa and Carnamah. The southeastern frontier is not clear, but is believed to have run down to the vicinity just north of Moora.

== History ==
Excavation at Yellabidde Cave near Leeman indicate that the Amangu territory was occupied as early as 23,000 BP, putting back the accepted date for habitation of the Perth-Geraldton coast by some 15,000 years.

== Some words ==
- agootha (mother) (Note: Foley lists amma for father, and aggo for mother. (Foley 1865, p. 297))
- ammatha (father)
- kilire, kullali (emu)
- mini (white man)
- yellabidde (emu)

== Sources ==
- "Aboriginal people inhabited WA's mid-west coast much earlier than previously thought". University of Western Australia. 4 November 2016.
- "AIATSIS map of Indigenous Australia". AIATSIS.
- Foley, R. J. (1865). Oldfield, Augustus (ed.). "Vocabulary of the Champion Bay Tribe" (PDF). Transactions of the Ethnological Society of London. 3: 297–298 – via Internet Archive.
- Goldsworthy, Roger Tuckfield (1886). "The Champion Bay tribe" (PDF). In Curr, Edward Micklethwaite (ed.). The Australian race: its origin, languages, customs, place of landing in Australia and the routes by which it spread itself over the continent. Vol. 1. Melbourne: J. Ferres. pp. 316–317 – via Internet Archive.
- Oldfield, Augustus (1865). Oldfield, Augustus (ed.). "On the Aborigines of Australia" (PDF). Transactions of the Ethnological Society of London. 3: 215–298. doi:10.2307/3014165. JSTOR 3014165 – via Internet Archive.
- "Tindale Tribal Boundaries" (PDF). Department of Aboriginal Affairs, Western Australia. September 2016. Archived from the original (PDF) on 8 March 2016.
- Tindale, Norman Barnett (1974). "Amangu (WA)". Aboriginal Tribes of Australia: Their Terrain, Environmental Controls, Distribution, Limits, and Proper Names. Australian National University. ISBN 978-0-708-10741-6. Archived from the original on 20 March 2020.
