= Geraldton Christian College =

Location
- Strathalbyn (Geraldton), Western Australia; Australia; 28°45′09″S 114°38′38″E

Information
- Former name: Strathalbyn Christian College
- School type: Primary, Secondary Private
- Motto: Learning God's Way
- Established: 1979
- Principal: Peter Handsworth (January, 2026)
- Grades: K–12
- Colours: Navy, green and white
- Team name: Strath Lions
- Website: gcc.wa.edu.au

Geraldton Christian College (previously Strathablyn Christian College) is a Christian college located in Geraldton, Western Australia.

The school was established in 1979. Situated in the suburb of Strathalbyn, the campus occupies an area of 8.5 ha (21 acres), with frontage along the Chapman River. It caters for students from Kindergarten to Year 12.

Sophia de Lange was the acting principal in 2025 until a new principal, Adrian Bosker, was appointed in July of the same year.
