= Champion (schooner) =

HMCS Champion
History

Colony of Western Australia
- Name: Champion
- Owner: Colony of Western Australia
- Port of registry: Fremantle
- Launched: 1830, Shoreham-by-Sea, Sussex, UK
- Acquired: November 1836
- Stricken: January 1852
- Fate: Scrapped

General characteristics
- Type: Schooner
- Tonnage: 118 tons
- Length: 22.86 m (75.0 ft)
- Beam: 5.75 m (18.9 ft)
- Draught: 3.53 m (11.6 ft)

HM Colonial Schooner (HMCS) Champion was in service with the Colony of Western Australia from 1836 until 1852.

Champion Bay, Geraldton, Western Australia was named after her by Lieutenant John Lort Stokes of HMS Beagle, who surveyed the area in April 1840. George Fletcher Moore had travelled in HMCS Champion to the region and first located the bay in January of that year.

In August 1852, HMCS Champion was laid-up at Garden Island and sold for scrap in January 1852. HMCS Champion's last captain whom commanded the vessel for over 10 years, Lt. Benjamin Franklin Helpman RN, later became the harbourmaster of Warrnambool, Victoria.

== Sea also ==
- Henry Bull, captain of HMCS Champion in 1836
- Peter Belches, captain between 1836 and 1840
