= Yinggarda language =

Aboriginal language of Western Australia

Yinggarda
- Yingkarta, Inggarda
- Native to: Australia
- Region: Gascoyne coast area of Western Australia; Shark Bay coast between Gascoyne and Wooramel rivers, inland to Red Hill, West Pilbara
- Ethnicity: Yingkarta (Tedei, Mandi), Maia
- Native speakers: 2 (2005)
- Language family: Pama–Nyungan: Southwest (Kartu?); Yinggarda
- Dialects: Maya †; Northern; Southern

Language codes
- ISO 639-3: yia
- Glottolog: ying1247
- AIATSIS: W19 Inggarda, W20 Maya
- ELP: Yingkarta
- Maya

The Yinggarda language (also written Yingkarta and Inggarda) is an Australian Aboriginal language. It is an endangered language, but efforts at language revival are being made.

== Name ==
"Yinggarda" has been spelt in a number of ways, some linguists (including Dench) writing it as "Yingkarta".

== Classification ==
It is one of the Kartu languages of the Pama–Nyungan family. The Ethnologue equates Yinggarda with Pulinya but it is unclear what the basis is for this connection as Wilfrid Douglas, who recorded the name 'Pulinya,' described it as a name for the old Geraldton language.

== Geographic distribution ==

Yinggarda country is around Carnarvon, on the central western coast of Western Australia, and extends inland to near Gascoyne Junction and south to around the mouth of the Wooramel River.

== Dialects ==
Maya (Maia), known only from 12 names of totem species identical to those in Yinggarda (e.g. yalipirri 'emu' and wura 'dog'), is reported to have been "like" Yinggarda and may have been a dialect.

== Language revival ==
A dictionary of Yinggarda by Peter K. Austin was published in 1992. A sketch grammar was written by Alan Dench in 1998, who worked with some of the last speakers and carried out his research mainly in the 1970s and 1980s. The Yamaji Language Centre, now the Irra Wangga Language Centre, has been continuing to work on the Yinggarda language since 1993.

As of 2020, Yinggarda is one of 20 languages prioritised as part of the Priority Languages Support Project, being undertaken by First Languages Australia and funded by the Department of Communications and the Arts. The project aims to "identify and document critically-endangered languages — those languages for which little or no documentation exists, where no recordings have previously been made, but where there are living speakers".

== Phonology ==
=== Consonants ===
| | Labial | Alveolar | Retroflex | Dental | Palatal | Velar |
|---|---|---|---|---|---|---|
| Stop | p | t | ʈ | t̪ | ɟ | k |
| Nasal | m | n | ɳ | n̪ | ɲ | ŋ |
| Lateral | | l | ɭ | l̪ | ʎ | |
| Rhotic | | ɾ~r | ɻ | | | |
| Approximant | w | | | | j | |

- The alveolar rhotic is realized as a "very lax" tap [ɾ] between vowels, often similar to an alveolar approximant [ɹ] in quality. It also becomes a trill [r] before consonants, and is often heard as a stop [d].
- Stops /k, t̪, ʈ/ are heard as [ɣ, ð, ɽ] when in intervocalic position.

=== Vowels ===
| | Front | Back |
|---|---|---|
| High | i iː | u uː |
| Low | a aː | |

Long vowels occur "very infrequently" in Yinggarda.
