= Nanda people =

Aboriginal Australian people of Western Australia

The Nhanda people, also spelt Nanda, Nhunda, Nhanta, and other variants, are an Aboriginal Australian people who live in the Mid West region of Western Australia around the mouth of the Murchison River.

== Language ==
The traditional language of the people was Nhanda, which had three dialect varieties: Nhanda to the north, Watchandi in the centre, around Port Gregory, and the southern dialect of Amangu. It differed notably from all the native languages spoken in contiguous areas in terms of its phonology, morphology and morphosyntax. (Note: "Nhanda is unique among languages in this area in displaying evidence of initial consonant loss, a voicing contrast in obstruents, a distinctive glottal stop, a tripartite system of bound pronominals, a verbal conjugation contrast between unaccusative and unergatives, and incipient case-marking system where intransitive subjects, transitive subjects and direct objects all have distinct case markers.") Its system of bound pronouns appears to be unique within Australia.

== Country ==
Norman Tindale estimated the Nhanda's tribal territories to cover some 6,300 square miles (16,000 km^{2}), stretching from Willigabi (Wilugabi) northwards along the coast to the vicinity of Northampton and Shark Bay, Hamelin Pool and Yaringa. Their northern neighbours were the Malgana and the Nokaan, while on their southern border were the Amangu.

On 28 November 2018, after a 24-year battle, Nhanda people were recognised as the traditional owners of more than 17,000 square kilometres (6,600 mi^{2}) of land and water in the Yamatji region, in Western Australia. Nhanda people have been awarded exclusive native title rights over several key areas including Paradise Flats, Bully, Wilgie Mia, Mooliabatanya and Syphon pools.

== Spring rites ==
Augustus Oldfield described the increase performances, Caroo, which took place in mid spring in the following terms:

At the time of the first new moon after the yams are ripe, the Watch-an-dies begin to lay in a stock of all kinds of food, sufficient to subsist them during the continuance of the festival. On the eve of the feast the women and children retire from the company of the men, shouting as they go, Ow-ee, Ow-ee, and henceforth, until the conclusion of the ceremony, the men are not permitted to look on a female, but sometimes, when their store of food prove insufficient, this law is a little infringed. The men thus left to themselves rub their bodies with a mixture of charcoal, ashes, and wallaby-fat; after which, having dug a large pit in the ground, they retire to rest, not, however, before they are gorged with the good things provided for the occasion. Early next morning they re-assemble and proceed to decorate themselves with a mixture of ochre and emu-fat, dressing their hair with fine shavings and wearing garlands of My-a-lie and A-rum-ba. This beautifying of their persons, with frequent feastings, lasts the whole day, but towards evening the real ceremony begins. They dance round the pit they have dug, shouting, singing, and some few whistling (this they never do in their common corrobories), and thus they continue all night long, each in turn snatching a few moments for rest and gormandising. Every figure of their dances, every gesture, the burden of all their songs, is calculated to inflame their passions. The pit is so dug and decorated with bushes as to represent the private parts of a female: as dance they carry the spear before them to simulate priapus: every gesture is obscene, and the character of the songs in vogue on such occasions may be understood from the following, which may be translated by means of the vocabulary:

Bool-lie neera, Bool-lie neera,
Bool-lie neera. Wad-a-ga.

At the conclusion of the ceremonies, when, as my informant told me, Aumanno-maddijubat-wabayadia, they place sticks in the ground to mark the scene of their orgies, and henceforth that is a tabood place, and any looking on it, inadvertently or not, will infallibly sicken and die. For sometime after the feast the men who have held it wear shavings in their hair to distinguish them as Caa-ro men.

== Social organisation ==
The Nhanda were divided into at least three groups:

- Buluguda
- Daguda (at Billiecutherra)
- Tamala (at Tamala Homestead)

They did not practise circumcision.

== Alternative names ==
- Yau (yo = "no")
- Jau
- Eaw (i'u =south)
- Watjandi (watju means "west")
- Watchandi, Watchandie
- Buluguda (also a toponym)
- Bulgulu
- Tamala (also a toponym)
- Daguda

== Some words ==
- ithu (otthoo) (tame dog)
- ngobano (wild dog)
- ama (amo) (father)
- agu (ago) (mother)
- erato (north)
- euna (south)
- angalo (east)
- watchu (west)
- arnmanu (man, person)
- nyarlu (woman)
- abarla (child)

== Sources ==
- "AIATSIS map of Indigenous Australia". AIATSIS. 10 November 2022.
- Barlee, Frederick (1886). "Shark Bay: The Majanna tribe" (PDF). In Curr, Edward Micklethwaite (ed.). The Australian race: its origin, languages, customs, place of landing in Australia and the routes by which it spread itself over the continent. Vol. 1. Melbourne: J. Ferres. pp. 306–309.
- Blevins, Juliette (2001). Nhanda: An aboriginal language of Western Australia. University of Hawai'i Press. ISBN 978-0-824-82375-7.
- Goldsworthy, Roger T. (1886). "Northhampton: Eaw Tribe" (PDF). In Curr, Edward Micklethwaite (ed.). The Australian race: its origin, languages, customs, place of landing in Australia and the routes by which it spread itself over the continent. Vol. 1. Melbourne: J. Ferres. pp. 314–315.
- "Mid West Nanda people win 24-year native title battle". PerthNow. AAP. 29 November 2018.
- "Native title win for Nanda people in WA". Special Broadcasting Service. 29 November 2018.
- Oldfield, Augustus (1865). "On the Aborigines of Australia". Transactions of the Ethnological Society of London. 3: 215–298. doi:10.2307/3014165. JSTOR 3014165.
- Oldfield, Augustus (1886). "The Mouth of the Murchison River: the Watchandi Tribes" (PDF). In Curr, Edward Micklethwaite (ed.). The Australian race: its origin, languages, customs, place of landing in Australia and the routes by which it spread itself over the continent. Vol. 1. Melbourne: J. Ferres. pp. 310–313.
- "Tindale Tribal Boundaries" (PDF). Department of Aboriginal Affairs, Western Australia. September 2016. Archived from the original (PDF) on 8 March 2016.
- Tindale, Norman Barnett (1974). "Nanda (WA)". Aboriginal Tribes of Australia: Their Terrain, Environmental Controls, Distribution, Limits, and Proper Names. Australian National University Press. ISBN 978-0-708-10741-6. Archived from the original on 20 March 2020.
