= Ajana =

- Town
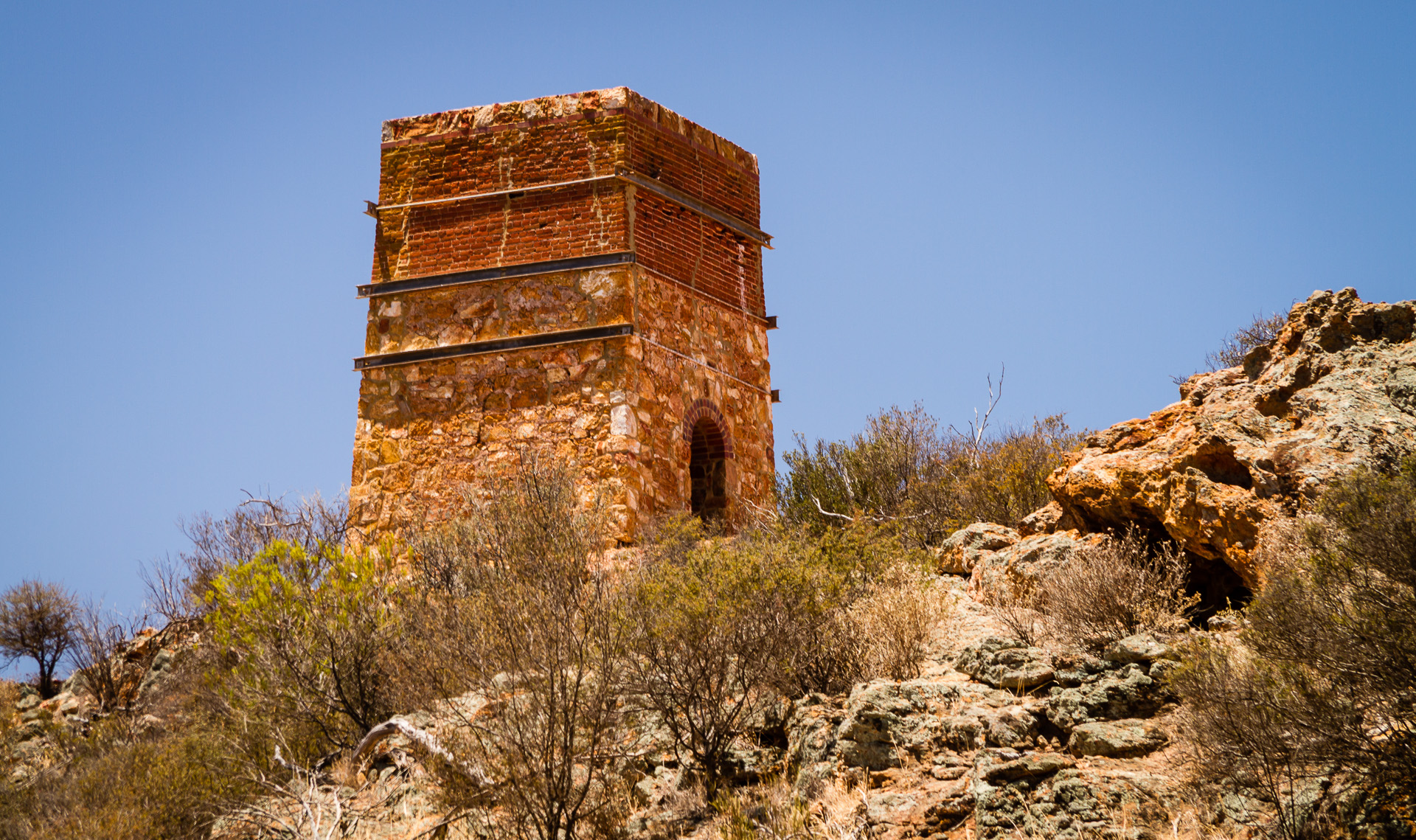
- Warribano Chimney

- Interactive map of Ajana
- Coordinates: 27.951516°S 114.637724°E
- Country: Australia
- State: Western Australia
- LGA: Shire of Northampton
- Location: 531 km (330 mi) north-northwest of Perth; 45 km (28 mi) north of Northampton; 54 km (34 mi) south-southeast of Kalbarri
- Established: 1915

Government
  - State electorate: Moore
  - Federal division: Durack

Area
  - Total: 728.2 km^{2} (281.2 sq mi)
- Elevation: 202 m (663 ft)

Population
  - Total: 51 (SAL 2021)
- Postcode: 6532

Ajana is a townsite within the Shire of Northampton in Western Australia. It is located at the junction of Ajana-Kalbarri Road and Ajana Back Road, 53 kilometres (33 mi) by road north of Northampton, 61 kilometres (38 mi) by road southwest of Kalbarri, and 531 kilometres (330 mi) west-northwest of Perth in the Mid West region.

The name Ajana is Aboriginal in origin and is thought to be either the Nanda name for the area or to be derived from a similar word meaning "mine".

== History ==
Ajana was the terminus of an extension to the first government railway line in Western Australia. The line originally ran from Northampton to Geraldton; it was extended to Ajana to encourage the development of lead mining and agriculture in the area. The station opened on 6 January 1913, and the townsite was declared on 26 November 1915. The railway terminated at the No 3 Rabbit Proof Fence, which ran through the townsite.

A telegraph station, built in 1845 at nearby Mount View Station, provided early communications for the town. A post office was established in 1922, and a school was built in the town in 1944. The railway line and Ajana station closed on 29 April 1957.

== Barrel Well Aboriginal Community ==
The Barrel Well Aboriginal Community is located 3.7 kilometres (2 mi) west-southwest of the Ajana townsite, on Warribanno Chimney Road. It sits on Victoria Location 11991, within the registered Nanda People (WAD6136/98) native title claim area, and has a population of 26, including 10 children.

The community is managed by the Barrel Well Nanda Aboriginal Corporation, a body incorporated under the Aboriginal Councils and Associations Act 1976 on 26 May 1992. The Management Order of Reserve 1457 Victoria Location 11991 Barrel Well was transferred from the Aboriginal Land Trust to the corporation on 28 June 2000.
