= Initial dropping =

Sound change

Initial dropping is a sound change whereby the first consonants of words are dropped. Additionally, stress may shift from the first to the second syllable, and the first vowel may be shortened, reduced, or dropped, which can mean the loss of the entire first syllable of a word. These changes have occurred independently in several Australian Aboriginal language groups.

Initial dropping may affect all initial consonants, or only some or one of them. It may affect all words that start with those consonants, or sporadically affect some words and not others. In some languages, it seems to have only affected interjections, and words commonly used as vocatives such as pronouns and kin terms. Like all sound changes, it may affect an entire language or just some dialects, and may affect multiple adjacent languages or dialects.

== Motivation ==
Initial dropping is caused by the nature of stress in Australian languages: although stress is usually on the first syllable, the pitch peak of stress occurs late in the syllable, so that stress applies to the vowel and the following consonant, but not the preceding consonant.

== Secondary effects ==
=== Cluster simplification ===
The loss of the initial vowel can result in a difficult consonant cluster. Some languages avoid this by disallowing initial dropping if the result is a difficult cluster. In Mbabaram for example, initial dropping doesn't occur if it results in a cluster other than nasal + stop.

*/ɟumbi/	→ /mbi/	"penis"
*/ɡurbuɻu/	→ /arbuɻ/	"east"

Other languages allow initial dropping, dropping additional consonants if needed to simplify the cluster. For example, in Ngkoth:

*/kalma-/	→ /ma-/	The root of the verb "to arrive".
*/kulŋkul/	→ /ŋkul/	"heavy"

=== Phonemicization ===
It's not unusual for the second consonant or vowel of a word to have an allophone conditioned by what the first consonant or vowel is. When this conditioning element is lost in initial dropping, these allophones become phonemes.

==== New vowels ====
In Mbabaram, an /a/ in the second syllable had [ɔ] as an allophone if the first syllable started with /ɡ/ or /ŋ/. When initial dropping occurred and the /ɡ ŋ/ were lost, the occurrence of [ɔ] was no longer predictable: it had become a phoneme /ɔ/, distinct from /a/.

*/ŋaba-/	→ *[ŋabɔ-]	→ /bɔ-/	The root of the verb "to bathe".
*/naɡa/	= *[naɡa]	→ /ɡa/	"east"

==== Prestopped nasals ====
Unlike many other languages, where nasalization tends to begin early so that vowels preceding a nasal are nasalized, in Australian languages nasalization tends to begin late, so that nasals may be preceded by a short stop.

In Olgolo, nasals in the second syllable had a prestopped allophone if the first syllable started with a stop or a /w/, and the vowel in the first syllable was short. When initial consonants were dropped and initial vowels shortened, the occurrence of the prestopped nasals was no longer predictable: Olgolo had innovated a series of prestopped nasal phonemes.

*/bama/	→ *[baᵇma]	→ /aᵇma/	"man"
*/ŋama/	= *[ŋama]	→ /ama(ŋar)/	"mother" (/-ŋar/ is a suffix.)

== List of initial-dropping languages ==
For details about the extent of initial dropping in a particular language, see that language's article.

- Adjnjamathanha
- Arabana
- Arrernte
- Baagandji
- Bidjara (Gunggari and Yanjdjibara dialects)
- Dharambal (Wapabara dialect)
- Kalkatungu
- Kaytetj
- Maljangapa
- Mbabaram
- Muruwarri
- Nganjaywana
- Nhanta
- Ogh-Undjan
- Oykangand/Olgolo
- Many Paman languages
- Umbindhamu
- Uradhi
- Yaygirr
- Yugambal
- Western Desert Language (some dialects)

== See also ==
- Aphesis
