= Badimaya =

Aboriginal Australian ethnic group in Western Australia

The Badimaya people (also written Badimia) are an Aboriginal Australian people from the Mid West region of Western Australia.

== Country ==
Traditional Badimaya country was calculated by Norman Tindale to encompass approximately 11,300 square miles (29,000 km^{2}), and is bordered by the Western Desert language groups of the Tjuparn and the Wanmala to the east, the Noongar to the south-west and Watjarri to the north-west.

This country covers Cue, Nannine and Mount Magnet to the north, Paynes Find to the south, Yalgoo to the southwest, and the northwest lay along the Sandford River.

== Language ==
Badimaya belongs to the Kartu branch of the Pama–Nyungan family. It is a critically endangered language, however there is a strong language revival movement underway in the Badimaya community.

== Social organisation and customs ==
The Badimaya were reported to practise both circumcision and subincision.

== Conservation reserves ==
In February 2021, the creation of five new conservation parks in Badimaya country covering over 114,000 ha (280,000 acres) were announced by the Government of Western Australia, to be jointly managed between the traditional owners and the Department of Biodiversity, Conservation and Attractions' Parks and Wildlife Service. The allocated land includes portions of two former pastoral leases, Lakeside and Burnerbinmah, as well as Crown land at Kirkalocka and White Wells. There are many significant Aboriginal sites of significance as well as other historic sites.

== Notable people ==
- Julie Dowling

== Alternative names and spellings ==
Names according to Norman Tindale:

- Badimala
- Badimara
- Barimaia, Bardimaia, Badimaia
- Bidungu (Watjarri exonym, meaning "rockhole water drinkers," implying shiftlessness)
- Padimaia
- Parimaia
- Patimara
- Waadal
- Wardal

== Sources ==
- "AIATSIS map of Indigenous Australia". AIATSIS. 14 May 2024.
- Bednall, James (compiler) (2020). Badimaya Dictionary: An Aboriginal language of Western Australia. Geraldton, W.A.: Bundiyarra-Irra Wangga Language Centre.
- Blevins, Juliette (2001). Nhanda: An Aboriginal Language of Western Australia. University of Hawaii Press. ISBN 978-0-824-82375-7.
- "Irra Wangga Language Centre: Mid West languages: Badimaya". Bundiyarra Aboriginal Community Aboriginal Corporation.
- Dawson, Stephen (2 February 2021). "Plan for Our Parks milestone as new Mid-West reserves created". Government of Western Australia. Archived from the original on 11 August 2021.
- George, Ollie (2017). Bednall, James; Chiera, Susan; Sitorus, Rosie (eds.). Nganang badimaya wangga: yarns with Gami Ollie George. Geraldton, W.A.: Bundiyarra-Irra Wangga Language Centre. ISBN 978-0-648-06240-0.
- "Tindale Tribal Boundaries" (PDF). Department of Aboriginal Affairs, Western Australia. September 2016. Archived from the original (PDF) on 8 March 2016.
- Tindale, Norman Barnett (1974). "Barimaia (WA)". Aboriginal Tribes of Australia: Their Terrain, Environmental Controls, Distribution, Limits, and Proper Names. Australian National University Press. ISBN 978-0-708-10741-6. Archived from the original on 21 December 2019.
