= Nhanda language =

Aboriginal language of Western Australia

Nhanda
- Nanda, Nhanta, Nhandi
- Native to: Australia
- Region: Geraldton to Shark Bay area of Western Australia
- Ethnicity: Nhanda
- Native speakers: ("few" cited 1995)
- Revival: 11-50 (2018-19)
- Language family: Pama–Nyungan: Kartu?; Nhanda–Nhanhagardi; Nhanda
- Dialects: Nhanta; Watchandi; Amangu; ? Ngukaja / Naaguja

Language codes
- ISO 639-3: nha
- Glottolog: nhan1238
- AIATSIS: W14
- ELP: Nhanta

Nhanda, also rendered Nanda, Nhanta and Nhandi, is an Australian Aboriginal language from the Midwest region of Western Australia, between Geraldton and the Murchison River, from the coast to about 20 kilometres (12 miles) inland. The language is now spoken, or semi-spoken, by only a few people.

The AIATSIS Austlang database says: "According to [Juliette] Blevins (2001:3) three dialects of Nhanda can be identified: Nhanda, the northernmost dialect, Watchandi W13, the central dialect, and Amangu W12, the southern dialect. Thus Nhanda is both a language name and a dialect name". No speakers have been listed in successive tallies since 1975, but the Irra Wangga Language Centre (formerly Yamaji Language Centre) has been working on its revival, originally led by Blevins. Nanakarti was apparently a distinct language.

While Nhanda is usually considered a member of the Kartu branch of the Pama–Nyungan family, distinctive features of Nhanda, relative to neighbouring languages have caused some linguists to question this classification, and/or classify Nhanda as an isolate.

A controversial hypothesis, first raised by historian Rupert Gerritsen, suggests that the unusual features of Nhanda may result from undocumented language contact during the early modern era, with the Dutch – in the form of shipwrecked seafarers stranded in Australia before European settlement had officially begun. Gerritsen's hypothesis has been rejected by linguist Juliette Blevins, an authority on Nhanda. Gerritsen critiqued the rejection of his views by Blevins in a subsequent paper, re-outlining his evidence of Dutch influence on Nhanda.

== Language revival ==
Juliette Blevins, at the time employed at the University of Western Australia, researched Nhanda in the 1990s and early 2000s in collaboration with the Yamaji Language Centre (now the Irra Wangga Language Centre) and published a grammar of the language. An illustrated topical dictionary, Nhanda Wangganhaa, was published by the Yamaji Language Centre in 1998. Other published works include papers on its phonology and history. Doug Marmion has also been working on the language.

== Phonology ==
Nhanda differs somewhat from its neighbouring languages in that it has a phonemic glottal stop, is initial-dropping (i.e. it has lost many initial consonants, leading to vowel-initial words) and the stop consonants show a phonemic length contrast.

=== Vowels ===
	Front	Back
High	i iː	u uː
Low	a aː	

- An unstressed /a/ can be realised as [ə] or [ʌ].

=== Consonants ===
		Peripheral		Laminal		Apical		Glottal
		Bilabial	Velar	Palatal	Dental	Alveolar	Retroflex	Glottal
Stop	voiceless	p	k	c	t̪ ⟨th⟩	t	ʈ ⟨rt⟩	ʔ ⟨'⟩
Stop	voiced	b	ɡ	ɟ ⟨j⟩	d̪ ⟨dh⟩	d	ɖ ⟨rd⟩	
Nasal		m	ŋ ⟨ng⟩	ɲ ⟨ny⟩	n̪ ⟨nh⟩	n	ɳ ⟨rn⟩	
Lateral				ʎ ⟨ly⟩	l̪ ⟨lh⟩	l	ɭ ⟨rl⟩	
Rhotic						r ⟨rr⟩	ɻ ⟨r⟩	
Semivowel		w		j ⟨y⟩	(j̪ ⟨yh⟩)			

== Grammar ==
Nhanda is a split-ergative language, meaning the nominals take an ergative-absolutive case system while the pronominals take a nominative-accusative one.

Case	Suffix	Nasal suffix
Ergative	-lu	-nngu
Absolutive	∅	∅
Nominative	∅	∅
Accusative	-nha	-nha
Instrumental	-lu	-nngu
Locative	-gu	-nngu
Locative path	-galu	-nngalu
Allative	-nngu	-nngu
Ablative	-ngu	-ngu
Dative	-wu	-wu

ngayi nyina-nhaa mambu-gu
1.SG sit-NPAST bone-LOC
I'm sitting on a bone

Nhanda distinguishes singular (unmarked), dual (-thada), and plural forms (-nu). The dual suffix is a reduced form of wuthada ('two'). If a plural suffix is applied to a root that ends with an u, base-final umlaut is triggered and the u becomes an i. Case and number suffixes have free order.

There are no true unbound third person pronouns in Nhanda.

Unbound pronouns
Person	Singular	Dual	Plural
1st	ngayi	ngayi-thada	ngayi-nu
2nd	nyini	nyini-thada	nyini-nu

Bound pronouns, however, are a different case.

Bound pronouns
	Direct object	Subject	Oblique
1SG	-nha	-wa	-tha
1DU, PL	-wana	-wana	-wana
2SG	-mda	-nyja	-nygu
2DU, PL			-nygu
3SG	unmarked	unmarked	-ra
3DU, PL	-ndha	unmarked	-ra

Nhanda verbs consist of a root followed by zero or more derivational suffixes. The two major conjugation classes are called NH and Y. There is no dominant word order.

Major conjugational classes
	NH		Y
Past	-nhii	Past perfective	-i
Past	-nhii	Past imperfective	-nu
Non-past	-nhaa	Present	-a
Non-past	-nhaa	Future realis	-ndha
Future irrealis	-nda, -ndha	Future irrealis	-nda, -ndha
Imperative	-ga, ∅	Imperative	-ga
Ambulative	-nggula	Ambulative	-nggula

== Vocabulary ==
The Nhanda word for 'man, human being' is arnmanu. It appears that when Norman Tindale collected information on Nhanda (or on the closely related variety thought to have been spoken in Geraldton) he was given this word, which he recorded as 'Amangu' and assumed it to be the 'tribal name' for this group. Blevins provides a word list at the end of her grammar.
