= Wajarri language =

Aboriginal Australian language

Wajarri
- Native to: Australia
- Region: Murchison area of Western Australia
- Ethnicity: 200 Watjarri (1981),, Nokaan
- Native speakers: 20 (2005)
- Language family: Pama–Nyungan: Kartu; Watjarri languages; Wajarri
- Dialects: Watjarri; Birdungu (Pidungu); ? Nhugarn (Nokaan) (extinct 1967)

Language codes
- ISO 639-3: wbv
- Glottolog: waja1257
- AIATSIS: A39 Wajarri, A71 Nhugarn
- ELP: Wajarri

Wajarri (/ˈwɒdʒəri/ WOJ-ə-ree, natively [wacari]) is an endangered Australian Aboriginal language. It is one of the Kartu languages of the Pama–Nyungan family.

== Geographic distribution ==
Wajarri country is inland from Geraldton, and extends as far south and west as Mullewa, north to Gascoyne Junction and east to Meekatharra.

== History and current status ==
The Yamaji Language Centre carried out work on Wajarri throughout the 1990s, producing an illustrated wordlist and various other items.

Since July 2005, the Irra Wangga–Geraldton Language Programme has continued work on the Wajarri language, producing publications including a print dictionary and a dictionary app, working with schools involved in the teaching of the language, and holding weekly community language classes (as of 2008). In 2008 Wajarri became the first Australian Aboriginal language available at senior secondary level (TEE) in the state of Western Australia.

People who are Wajarri speakers, or who are descended primarily from Wajarri speakers, also refer to themselves as Wajarri (Wajari). The word for 'man' in Wajarri is yamatji (yamaji), and this word is also commonly used by Wajarri people to refer to themselves. Depending on the context, yamaji may also be used to refer to other Aboriginal people, particularly people from the Murchison-Gascoyne region.

Sketch grammars of Wajarri have been written by Douglas (1981) and Marmion (1996).

== Phonology ==
=== Vowels ===
	Front	Back
High	i iː	u uː
Low	a aː	

=== Consonants ===
	Peripheral		Laminal		Apical	
	Labial	Velar	Dental	Palatal	Alveolar	Retroflex
Plosive	p ⟨b⟩	k ⟨g⟩	t̪ ⟨th⟩	c ⟨j⟩	t ⟨d⟩	ʈ ⟨rd⟩
Nasal	m	ŋ ⟨ng⟩	n̪ ⟨nh⟩	ɲ ⟨ny⟩	n	ɳ ⟨rn⟩
Lateral			l̪ ⟨lh⟩	ʎ ⟨ly⟩	l	ɭ ⟨rl⟩
Rhotic					r ⟨rr⟩	
Approximant	w			j ⟨y⟩		ɻ ⟨r⟩

The symbols in brackets show the forms used in the practical orthography employed in the Wajarri dictionary, where these differ from standard IPA symbols. Although Douglas (1981) claimed that there was no laminal contrast (i.e. no phonemic contrast between the dentals and palatals), Marmion (1996) demonstrated that there is such a contrast.

== Vocabulary ==
According to Julitha Joan Walker (1931–2009), her first name, Julitha, was a Wajarri word for 'walkabout'.

== Sources ==
- Boddington, Ross and Boddinton, Olive. 1996. The Budara Story. Magabala Books.
- Douglas, Wilfrid H. 1981. 'Watjarri'. In Dixon, R.M.W. and Blake, Barry J (Eds.), Handbook of Australian Languages: Vol. 2. ANU Press.
- Mackman, Doreen (Ed.). 2012. Wajarri dictionary: the language of the Murchison Region of Western Australia, Wajarri to English, English to Wajarri. Geraldton, Irra Wangga Language Centre.
- Marmion, Douglas. 1996. A description of the morphology of Wajarri. Unpublished Hons. thesis, University of New England.
