= Yamatji =

Wajarri word for some Aboriginal Australians

Yamatji (or Yamaji) is a Wajarri word that has at least two different meanings:

- a member of the Wajarri people
- any Aboriginal Australian from the Murchison region of Western Australia. (Note: "yamatji..is commonly in the Murchison for anyone of Aboriginal descent who was born in the district. Other terms are applied to other districts: for instance, Aborigines from farther east are called Wanmala, and those from the south-west Nunga (Noongar).")

Yamatji peoples were involved in a large native title claim since 1996, resulting in an historic determination in February 2020, involving both native title and an Indigenous land use agreement covering an area of 48,000 square kilometres (19,000 sq mi).

== Native Title claims ==
The Yamatji Marlpa Aboriginal Corporation (YMAC) is "recognised as a Native Title Representative Body under Section (s) 203AD of the Native Title Act 1993 (Cth) (NTA) to preserve, protect and promote the recognition of native title in the Yamatji and Marlpa regions of Western Australia (WA). As an Aboriginal corporation, YMAC is governed by the Corporations (Aboriginal and Torres Strait Islander) Act 2006 (Cth)".

There have been four executive directors of the YMAC: Wayne Warner (1996-1998); former AFL footballer Clinton Wolf (1998-2001); Roger Cook (2001-2003) and current CEO Simon Hawkins (2003–present). YMAC was until 2017 co-chaired by Pilbara representative Doris Eaton (Note: Eaton was recognised as the NAIDOC Female Elder of the Year in 2009.) and Yamatji representative Ben Roberts. Peter Windie (Yamatji) and Natalie Parker (Pilbara) have held the positions since then.

=== Claims ===
As of 2017 the Yamatji had made two of the twelve claims for native title in the Geraldton region. One, concerning the Wajarri Yamatji, was filed in 2004. The second was filed by the Southern Yamatji in 2017.

The claim process was started in 1996, including several different groups making overlapping claims. In February 2016, a Federal Court of Australia judicial registrar convened mediation, resulting in outstanding overlaps being resolved and the commencement of negotiations with the Western Australian Government. In 2019, more than 1,000 claimants from four different claim groups came together in the Yamatji Nation Southern Regional Agreement, which brought together the claims of Southern Yamatji, Hutt River, Mullewa Wadjari and Widi Mob groups.

After two years of intense negotiations, on 7 February 2020 the Yamatji Nation was awarded both native title recognition and a A$450 million package, for a claim of an area covering nearly 48,000 square kilometres (19,000 sq mi), as far north as Kalbarri, east to Yalgoo, and south to Dalwallinu. There are about 9,000 traditional owners involved in the claim. It was the first time in Australia that both native title recognition and an Indigenous land use agreement have been determined simultaneously. The decision had special significance for the Yamatji people, because of the widespread physical dispossession of their lands.

As a result of the decision, Yamatji Nation will hold non-exclusive possession rights over parts of the former Barnong, Menai Hills and Kadji Kadji pastoral leases, as well as land near Wanda Nature Reserve, Lucky Bay and Aboriginal Lands Trust areas in Carnamah, Kadathini and Eneabba. It does not give them the right to control access and use of an area, but it does allow them to access, hunt and camp on this country. A conservation area will be created under joint management, empowering the traditional owners to be able to care for their country, and will offer opportunities for Indigenous ranger programs in the region.

Minister for Indigenous Australians, Ken Wyatt, stressed the significance of the decision, saying "It gives, through this determination, traditional owners a place at the table. You are no longer sitting outside waiting for a decision, you are co-developing, co-designing the future".

=== Boolardy/MRO ILUA ===
Boolardy Station, the site of the Murchison Radio-astronomy Observatory (MRO), lies on the traditional lands of the Wajarri. The Commonwealth Scientific and Industrial Research Organisation (CSIRO) and the Australian Square Kilometre Array Pathfinder (ASKAP) office have been working with a group of Wajarri Yamatji people to enable the various radio telescope projects located on the MRO to proceed. For several years leading up to 2020, negotiations have been taking place ahead of the signing of an ILUA between the Wajarri people and the CSIRO, guided by the federal Department of Industry, Innovation and Science (in 2020 the Department of Industry, Science, Energy and Resources).

About 15 traditional owners are involved in the negotiations, representing different groups. There are challenges involved in working out how to respect the cultural significance of the area, and how to build the infrastructure (ultimately part of the international Square Kilometre Array (SKA) project) with minimal disruption to the landscape. Surveys of heritage sites have been undertaken, but the work and negotiations were somewhat disrupted by the COVID-19 pandemic in Australia.

== Notable Yamatji ==
- Mark Atkins, musician
- Brooke Blurton, youth worker and media personality
- Ernie Dingo, actor
- Julieka Ivanna Dhu, young woman who died in police custody
- Emma Donovan, musician
- Sue Gordon, magistrate
- Associate Professor Scott Bingley, Academic
- Gnarnyarrhe Inmurray Waitairie, musician, actor, champion rodeo rider, educator, 2001 CD of original songs: Yamatji Yummadi, Blackfella By Himself.
- David Ngoombujarra, actor
- Ben Wyatt, politician
- Ken Wyatt, first Indigenous member of the Australian House of Representatives, and of Yamatji, Wongi, Noongar and Irish descent
- Charmaine Papertalk Green, artist, poet
- Brian McKinnon, artist
- Laurie Bellotti, Australian rules football player
- Tanya Oxtoby, first Indigenous captain in the Westfield W-League and Bristol City Women manager
- Kevin Taylor, Australian rules football player
- Frank Mallard, WA Senior Australian of the Year 2019, serviceman, elder

== Sources ==
- Breen, Marcus (1991). "Aboriginal music: The original songlines". In Broughton, Simon; Ellingham, Mark; Trillo, Richard (eds.). World Music: Latin & North America, Caribbean, India, Asia and Pacific. Vol. 2. Rough Guides. pp. 8–19. ISBN 978-1-858-28636-5.
- Douglas, Wilfred H. (1981). "Watjarri". In Dixon, Robert M. W.; Blake, Barry J. (eds.). Handbook of Australian Languages. Vol. 2. John Benjamins Publishing. pp. 197–272. ISBN 978-9-027-27354-3.
- Harrold, Jenni; Whitby, Joanne (1996). Aboriginal Studies. R.I.C. Publications. ISBN 978-1-863-11434-9.
- "Land, Approvals and Native Title Unit". Government of Western Australia. 1 August 2017. Archived from the original on 29 August 2017.
- "News from Yamatji Marlpa Aboriginal Corporation" (PDF). YMAC News (32). February 2017. Archived from the original (PDF) on 29 August 2017.
- Nicol, Emily (26 January 2017). "Iconic Indigenous artists sing their own anthems". National Indigenous Television.
- "Our Chairperson wins 'Elder of the Year' Award". Yamatji Marlpa Aboriginal Corporation. 14 July 2009.
- "Southern Yamatji (WC2017/002)". National Native Title Tribunal. 3 April 2017. Archived from the original on 29 August 2017.
- Taylor, Paige; Bodey, Michael (23 July 2011). "The pain and joy of lost star David Ngoombujarra". The Australian.
- Tucak, Phil (29 September 2010). "Ken Wyatt makes Australian political history". SBS.
- "Wajarri Yamatji (WC2004/010)". National Native Title Tribunal. 21 December 2004. Archived from the original on 29 August 2017.
- Wyatt, Ben (18 March 2015). "Ben Wyatt, MP, fights for remote Aboriginal communities in WA – IndigenousX". The Guardian.
- "Yamatji Marlpa Aboriginal Corporation". Yamatji Marlpa Aboriginal Corporation. 30 January 2007.
