= Kartu languages =

Australian indigenous language group

Kartu
- Kardu
- Geographic distribution: Western Australia
- Linguistic classification: Pama–Nyungan: Southwest; Kartu
- Subdivisions: Yinggarda; Malgana; ?Nhanda–Nhanhagardi; Wajarri; Badimaya; Thaagurda †

Language codes
- Glottolog: kart1249
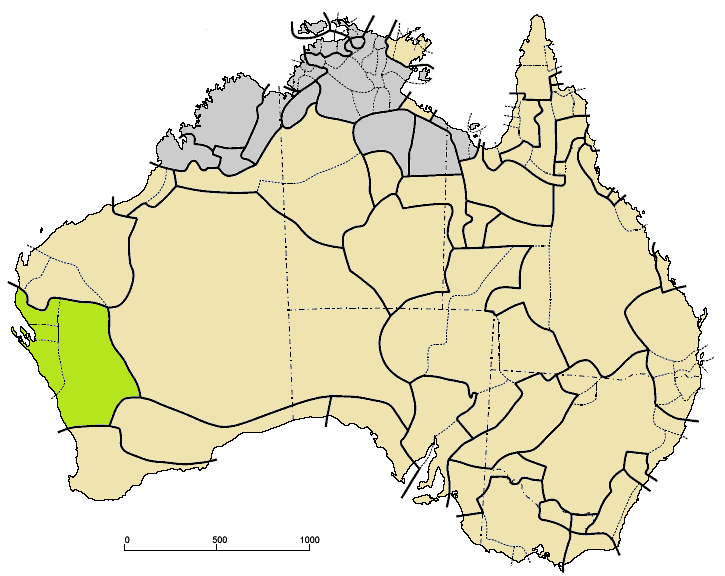
- Kartu languages (green) among other Pama–Nyungan (tan). Wajarri is the southern and interior group.

The Kartu languages are a group of Indigenous Australian languages spoken in the Murchison and Gascoyne regions of Western Australia. They are thought to be closely related and to form a low-level genealogical group.

The languages usually considered to be members of the Kartu group are, from north to south:

- Yinggarda
- Malgana
- ? Nhanda (possibly also Nhanhagardi)
- Wajarri
- Badimaya

The inclusion of Nhanda is dubious. It was excluded in Bowern & Koch (2004), but retained in Bowern (2011). Thaagurda was apparently also a Kartu language.

The name kartu comes from the word for 'man' in one of the languages. In some earlier work the word 'kardu' was spelled.

The Kartu languages form a branch of the Pama–Nyungan family.
