= Wilfrid Douglas =

Irish-Australian linguist (1917–2004)

Wilfrid Henry Douglas ("Wilf") (4 July 1917 – 22 March 2004) was a missionary, linguist and translator, and carried out important early work on many indigenous Australian languages.

Born in Belfast in 1917, Douglas came to Australia at the age of 11, sailing for Australia with 30 other boys destined for Fairbridge Farm School at Western Australia. After two years at Fairbridge he went to Perth to work on a poultry farm, then ticket writing until 1937 when he entered Perth Bible Institute.

In 1938 at the age of 21 he went to the siding of Badjaling in the Western Australian wheatbelt as a school teacher for the United Aborigines Mission (UAM) and in those early days started to take an interest in the language of the Noongar people who lived at Badjaling.

After a period in the Australian Army from 1941–45, working at Hollywood Military Hospital, Karrakatta Military Camp and Rottnest Island, he went to Gnowangerup Mission then in 1945 married Elizabeth Weir. The following year after the birth of their son, John, they went to the Kimberley, and it was at Sunday Island that Wilf attempted to translate verses from the Bible into the Bardi language. This struggling attempt, initially with John 3:16, led to a long association with the Wycliffe Bible Translators through their annual Summer Institute of Linguistics and a lifetime of Bible translation and detailed study of Aboriginal languages.

After he undertook some linguistic studies at The University of Sydney, an opportunity arose in 1951 for the Douglas family to go to Ooldea on the Transline in South Australia to do language work with the UAM. Here he worked for the first time with speakers of the Western Desert Language and produced a phonology and grammar. A year later they moved to Warburton Ranges and during this time their second son Robert was born. It was here that he produced his works Introduction to the Western Desert Language (pub. Sydney Uni 1957) and his Illustrated Topical Dictionary of the Western Desert Language (1959). Wilf's concern for the establishment of an indigenous Church with a Bible in its own language became a central factor in his work, leading to the establishment in 1955 of the Western Desert Bible School and Translation Centre at Mt Margaret.

In 1957 the family moved to Kalgoorlie and the following year Wilf established the UAM Language Department which he headed up for another 24 years, until the establishment of the Aboriginal-run Ngaanyatjarra Bible Project. The Language Department provided oversight of Bible translators in the Western Desert and Kimberley regions of Western Australia and led to opportunities for many hundreds of people in these regions to read and understand the Bible in their own language.

Douglas continued his work with the Noongar language and in 1968 he published his The Aboriginal Languages of the South-West of Australia (AIAS press).

He also carried out work in the Geraldton region on Wajarri (which he spelled 'Watjarri'), publishing a sketch grammar of the language in 1981.

In 2002, the Bible Society in Australia presented him with the Elizabeth Macquarrie Award for his contribution to Bible translation.

Douglas continued his work throughout his life, continuing work on a new edition of his Illustrated Dictionary of the South West Language until just before his death.

The life of Wilfrid Douglas has been recorded in a book by his son Rob Douglas.

== Select bibliography ==
- Douglas, Wilfrid (1950). N'ul-N'ul. A brief description of the Nyul-Nyul language of the Dampier Peninsula, based on restricted information supplied by Dr A. Capell and presented as an essay at the Dept. of Anthropology, University of Sydney. Unpublished ms.
- Douglas, Wilfrid (1954). Wangka 1-5. A set of primers in the Ngaanyatjarra language. United Aborigines Mission.
- Douglas, Wilfrid (1955). "Phonology of the Australian Aboriginal Language spoken at Ooldea, S.A., 1951-1952". Oceania. XXV (3): 216–229. doi:10.1002/j.1834-4461.1955.tb00647.x.
- Douglas, Wilfrid (1958). An Introduction to the Western Desert Language (Oceania Linguistic Monographs no. 4 ed.). University of Sydney.
- Douglas, Wilfrid (1959). Illustrated Topical Dictionary of the Western Desert Language. Perth: United Aborigines Mission.
- Douglas, Wilfrid (1976). The Aboriginal languages of the South-West of Australia (Revised version of Douglas 1968) (Australian Aboriginal Studies Research and Regional Studies no. 9 ed.). Canberra: AIAS.
- Douglas, Wilfrid (1981). R.M.W. Dixon and B.J. Blake (ed.). Watjarri (Handbook of Australian Languages, Vol. 2 ed.). Canberra: ANU. pp. 197–272.
- Douglas, Wilfrid (1990). Illustrated Topical Dictionary of the Western Desert Language, revised edition. Kalgoorlie: Kalgoorlie College.
