= Champion Bay =

Bay in Western Australia

Coordinates: 28°45′S 114°36′E

Champion Bay is a coastal feature north of Geraldton, Western Australia, facing the port and city between Point Moore and Bluff Point.

Champion Bay was named by Lieutenant John Lort Stokes of HMS Beagle, who surveyed the area in April 1840. He named it after the colonial schooner Champion, in which George Fletcher Moore had travelled to the region and first located the bay in January of that year.

The locality at the bay was also called Champion Bay. The townsite of Geraldton was surveyed in 1850, named after Captain Charles Fitzgerald, 4th Governor of Western Australia.

The area around Champion Bay was traditionally inhabited by an Aboriginal people who spoke the Nhanhagardi language.

In 1877 a lighthouse was with a diptric lens was built at Bluff Point in Champion Bay. The upper square portion was 7.5 metres high while the lower octagonal base was 11.3 metres high.
