= Wajarri =

Aboriginal Australian people of Western Australia

The Wajarri people, also spelt Wadjari, Wadjarri, Watjarri, and other variations, are an Aboriginal Australian people whose traditional lands are in the Mid West region of Western Australia.

Boolardy Station, along with the tiny settlement of Pia Wajarri adjacent to it, are part of the site of the Murchison Radio-astronomy Observatory (MRO). As the MRO lies within Wajarri country, negotiations towards an Indigenous land use agreement (ILUA) have been proceeding for some years.

== Country ==
Wajarri lands are located in the Mid West (also known as Murchison) region, encompass an estimated 35,000 square miles (91,000 km^{2}). The northern borders range as far as the hills above Lyons River headwaters, including Mount Isabella and the Teano and Waldburg ranges. The upper Gascoyne River also forms part of their traditional lands. The western border is around Byro and the Dalgety Downs, and west of the Three Rivers. Erivilla, and Milgun. Wadjari lands extend as far south as Cheangwa and the Roderick and upper Sanford rivers.

=== Indigenous Land Use Agreement ===
Boolardy Station, the site of the Murchison Radio-astronomy Observatory, lies on the traditional lands of the Wajarri people. The Commonwealth Scientific and Industrial Research Organisation (CSIRO) and the Australian Square Kilometre Array Pathfinder office have been working with the Wajarri people to enable the various radio telescope projects located on the MRO to proceed. It is important to respect Wajarri cultural needs as well as to deliver some benefits to people, in particular the tiny and remote Pia Wajarri community next to Boolardy Station. For several years leading up to 2020, negotiations have been taking place ahead of the signing of an ILUA between the Wajarri people and the CSIRO, guided by the federal Department of Industry, Innovation and Science (now the Department of Industry, Science, Energy and Resources).

About 15 traditional owners are involved in the negotiations, representing different groups. There are challenges involved in working out how to respect the cultural significance of the area, and how to build the infrastructure (ultimately part of the international Square Kilometre Array project) with minimal disruption to the landscape. Surveys of heritage sites have been undertaken, but the work and negotiations were somewhat disrupted by the COVID-19 pandemic.

The Wajarri people are still able to move freely across the land, so long as they respect the radio silence. The MRO was designated a protected radio quiet zone by the Australian Communications and Media Authority in April 2005, and in July 2011, an enhanced radio-quiet zone was imposed. As of December 2020, the outer "coordination" zone extends for a radius of 260 km (160 mi). Within the radio quiet zone, there are restrictions on all radio communications equipment, including television transmitters, mobile phones, CB radios, and other devices, so as not to interfere with radio telescopes.

== Language ==
Wajarri is one of the Kartu languages.

== See also ==
- Yamatji - sometimes used to mean a member of the Wajarri people, but also has wider usage

== Sources ==
- "AIATSIS map of Indigenous Australia". AIATSIS. 14 May 2024.
- "Tindale Tribal Boundaries" (PDF). Department of Aboriginal Affairs, Western Australia. September 2016. Archived from the original (PDF) on 8 March 2016.
- Douglas, Wilfred H. (1981). "Watjarri". In Dixon, Robert M. W.; Blake, Barry J. (eds.). Handbook of Australian Languages. Vol. 2. John Benjamins Publishing. pp. 197–272. ISBN 978-9-027-27354-3.
- Koch, Harold (2004). "A methodological history of Australian linguistic classification". In Bowern, Claire; Koch, Harold (eds.). Australian Languages: Classification and the comparative method. John Benjamins Publishing. pp. 17–59. ISBN 978-9-027-29511-8.
- McConvell, P.; Thieberger, Nicholas (November 2001). "State of Indigenous languages in Australia 2001" (PDF). Department of the Environment and Heritage.
- Tindale, Norman Barnett (1974). "Wadjari (WA)". Aboriginal Tribes of Australia: Their Terrain, Environmental Controls, Distribution, Limits, and Proper Names. Australian National University. ISBN 978-0-708-10741-6. Archived from the original on 20 March 2020.
