= Geraldton =

Geraldton: Jambinu (Wajarri); Jambinbirri (Wilunyu)
- City
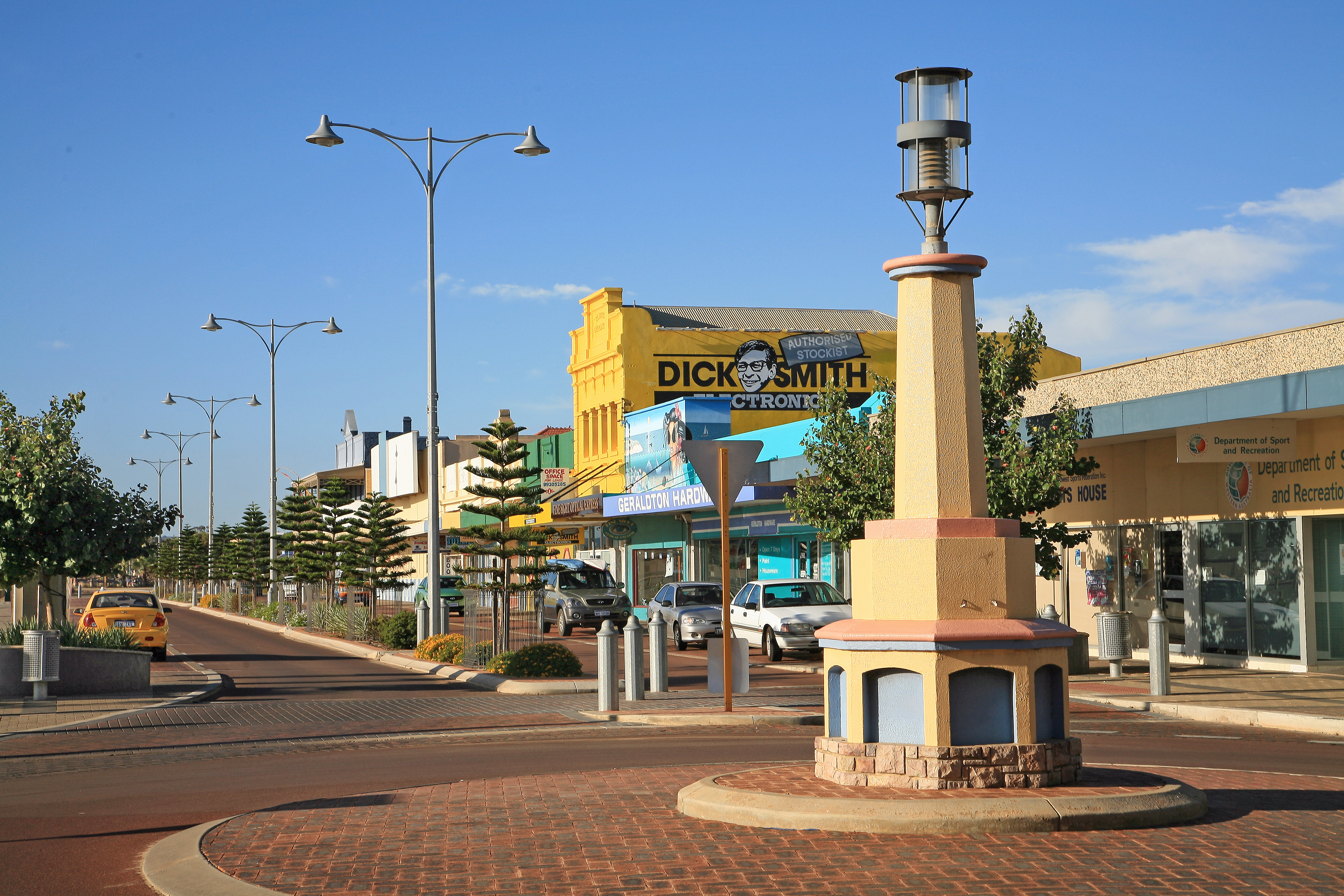
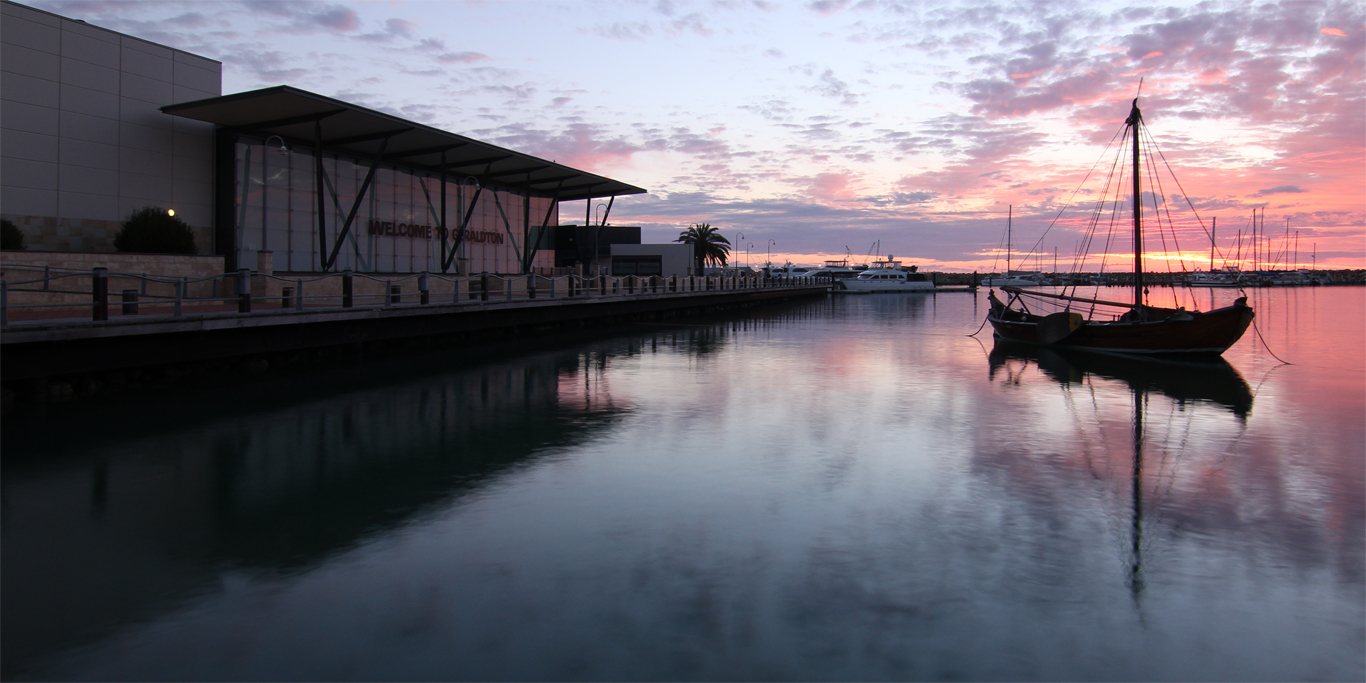
- Marine Terrace in Geraldton Geraldton Marina

- Coordinates: 28°46′28″S 114°36′32″E
- Country: Australia
- State: Western Australia
- Region: Mid West
- LGA: City of Greater Geraldton
- Location: 424 km (263 mi) NNW of Perth; 476 km (296 mi) S of Carnarvon
- Established: 1850

Government
  - State electorate: Geraldton
  - Federal division: Durack

Area (2011 urban)
  - Total: 270.7 km^{2} (104.5 sq mi)

Population
  - Total: 38,595 (2021 census) (41st)
  - Density: 142.575/km^{2} (369.27/sq mi)
- Time zone: UTC+8 (AWST)
- Postcode: 6530, 6531, 6532
- Mean max temp: 26.1 °C (79.0 °F)
- Mean min temp: 13.7 °C (56.7 °F)
- Annual rainfall: 416.3 mm (16.39 in)

Geraldton (/ˈd͡ʒɛɹəltən/, JER-əl-tən; Wajarri: Jambinu, Wilunyu: Jambinbirri) is a coastal city in the Mid West region of Western Australia, 424 kilometres (263 mi) north of the state capital, Perth.

As of the 2021 census, Geraldton had an urban population of 38,595. Geraldton is the seat of government for the City of Greater Geraldton, which also incorporates the town of Mullewa, Walkaway and large rural areas previously forming the shires of Greenough and Mullewa.

The Port of Geraldton is a major west coast seaport. Geraldton is an important service and logistics centre for regional mining, fishing, wheat, sheep and tourism industries.

== Toponymy ==
The city is believed to have been named in honour of Captain Charles Fitzgerald, Governor of Western Australia from 1848 to 1855. The name Geraldton was likely chosen by the Surveyor General of Western Australia, John Septimus Roe.

Fitzgerald had been closely involved in the events leading up to Geraldton's foundation. In December 1848, shortly after his arrival at the then economically stagnant Swan River Colony, he landed at Champion Bay to view pastoral land and mineral resources in and around what is now the Geraldton area. There, he joined a party led by Augustus Gregory that travelled on foot to inspect a lead deposit at Galena on the Murchison River recently described by Gregory and others.

Later, without informing his masters in England, Fitzgerald implemented plans he had made for the future city. By March 1859, Gregory had surveyed and marked out allotments in the future city's townsite. On 3 June 1851, the townsite was declared.

In Wadjarri, the most widely spoken Australian Aboriginal language of the Mid West and Gascoyne regions, the name of Champion Bay, and also now Geraldton, is Jambinu.

In the Wilunyu language of the Aboriginal people of Champion Bay, the area's name is Jambinbirri. That name is derived from the word 'Jambinbai', which "... was adopted phonetically from the colonists' name ..." (ie Champion Bay), as the name previously given by the local Aboriginal people to the area had been "... lost in the cultural destruction that followed ..." European settlement.

== History ==
=== Aboriginal ===
Clear evidence has established Aboriginal people living on the west coast of Australia for at least 40,000 years, though at present it is unclear when the first Aboriginal people reached the area around Geraldton.

The original local Aboriginal people of Geraldton are the Amangu people, with the Nanda immediately to the north and Badimaya immediately to the east. Today the Aboriginal people of the region generally identify as Yamatji or Wajarri people. Wajarri country is inland from Geraldton and extends as far south and west as Mullewa, north to Gascoyne Junction and east to Meekatharra. The Aboriginal people of the Murchison-Gascoyne region were instrumental in assisting early settlers in the area in identifying permanent water sources, and worked in the pearling, pastoral and fishing industries.

Yamatji art is a distinctive style of painting, using thousands of dots of ochre and other earth-based pigments to create patterns and images relevant to Yamatji/Wajarri culture.

The Western Australia Museum at the marina in Geraldton hosts a permanent exhibit on Yamatji/Wajarri culture and history of the region.

=== European arrival ===
Many European mariners encountered, or were wrecked on, the Houtman Abrolhos islands 60 kilometres (37 mi) west of Geraldton during the 17th and 18th centuries. Although two mutineers from the Batavia were marooned on the mainland in 1629 there is no surviving evidence that they made landfall at or near the site of the current town.

The wreck of the Batavia, flagship of the Dutch East India Company (VOC) fleet on her maiden voyage, on Morning Reef of the Houtman Abrolhos on 4 June 1629, and the events surrounding the subsequent mutiny, rescue and punishment of her crew are of great historical significance to the region. A detailed account of the events is recorded in a 24 December 1897 Western Mail article "The Abrolhos Tragedy", translated from the notes of Francois Pelsaert, the commander of the Batavia when she ran aground. The Western Australian Museum in Geraldton houses an exhibition of clay pipes, silver coins, cannons, the original Batavia stone portico and numerous other relics recovered from the wreck of the Batavia and other notable local historical shipwrecks such as the Zuytdorp, Zeewijk and Vergulde Draeck.

The explorer George Grey, while on his second disastrous expedition along the Western Australian coast, passed over the future site of Geraldton on 7 April 1839. George Fletcher Moore, the colony's attorney-general, on the colonial schooner Champion, explored the region in January 1840 and discovered Champion Bay. He was followed by Captain John Clements Wickham and Lieutenant John Lort Stokes of HMS Beagle, who led an expedition to the area in April 1840, and named and surveyed Point Moore and Champion Bay.

A decade later, explorer Augustus Gregory travelled through the area. A member of his party, James Perry Walcott, discovered lead ore in 1848 in the bed of the Murchison River. The Geraldine Lead Mine was subsequently established, named after the County Clare family home of Charles FitzGerald, the 4th Governor of Western Australia. The town of Geraldton, named after Governor FitzGerald, was surveyed in 1850 and land sales began in 1851.

=== World War II ===
During World War II, Geraldton was the location of No. 4 Service Flying Training School RAAF. This flying school was formed on 10 February 1941 and disbanded in May 1945.

== Climate ==
Geraldton has a Mediterranean climate (Köppen Csa) with semi-arid (BSk) influence. Geraldton is very sunny, receiving around 164 clear days annually. Summers are long lasting and hot, though with relatively mild nights. Winters are short but mild and wet with cool nights. Mean sea temperatures in the summer months (measured at 10m) are consistently above 22 °C (71.6 °F), often exceeding 24 °C (75.2 °F). Surface sea temperatures in summer regularly exceed 26 °C (78.8 °F).

In the winter the temperature is mild with daily highs averaging around 20 °C (68 °F). Most of the yearly rainfall falls in this period.

In the summer months, Geraldton averages 32–33 °C (90–91 °F), with some days over 40 °C (104 °F). Afternoon sea breezes cool coastal areas and summer temperatures in coastal suburbs of Geraldton (Seacrest, Tarcoola, Geraldton CBD, Beresford, Sunset Beach, Bluff Point and Drummond Cove) are generally cooler than in inland suburbs, such as Strathalbyn, Utakarra, Woorree, Deepdale and Moonyoonooka. On 18 February 2024 and 20 January 2025, Geraldton recorded its highest ever temperature of 49.3 °C (120.7 °F), breaking the previous record of 47.7 °C (117.9 °F) set on 9 January 1954.

Climate data for Geraldton Airport, Moonyoonooka (1981–2020 normals, 1941–present extremes)
Month	Jan	Feb	Mar	Apr	May	Jun	Jul	Aug	Sep	Oct	Nov	Dec	Year
Record high °C (°F)	49.3 (120.7)	49.3 (120.7)	45.2 (113.4)	39.7 (103.5)	36.6 (97.9)	29.5 (85.1)	29.0 (84.2)	31.6 (88.9)	36.1 (97.0)	40.7 (105.3)	43.8 (110.8)	46.8 (116.2)	49.3 (120.7)
Mean daily maximum °C (°F)	31.6 (88.9)	32.8 (91.0)	31.2 (88.2)	28.2 (82.8)	24.5 (76.1)	21.2 (70.2)	19.6 (67.3)	20.0 (68.0)	22.1 (71.8)	24.8 (76.6)	27.6 (81.7)	29.5 (85.1)	26.1 (79.0)
Daily mean °C (°F)	24.8 (76.6)	26.0 (78.8)	24.6 (76.3)	21.9 (71.4)	18.9 (66.0)	16.2 (61.2)	14.6 (58.3)	14.6 (58.3)	15.8 (60.4)	17.9 (64.2)	20.8 (69.4)	22.9 (73.2)	19.9 (67.8)
Mean daily minimum °C (°F)	18.0 (64.4)	19.1 (66.4)	18.0 (64.4)	15.6 (60.1)	13.3 (55.9)	11.1 (52.0)	9.5 (49.1)	9.1 (48.4)	9.4 (48.9)	11.0 (51.8)	14.0 (57.2)	16.3 (61.3)	13.7 (56.7)
Record low °C (°F)	9.4 (48.9)	10.0 (50.0)	8.8 (47.8)	6.1 (43.0)	2.1 (35.8)	0.5 (32.9)	−0.4 (31.3)	1.2 (34.2)	1.2 (34.2)	2.4 (36.3)	3.8 (38.8)	7.7 (45.9)	−0.4 (31.3)
Average precipitation mm (inches)	5.5 (0.22)	5.0 (0.20)	10.7 (0.42)	18.9 (0.74)	19.5 (0.77)	65.2 (2.57)	82.5 (3.25)	87.5 (3.44)	63.5 (2.50)	34.4 (1.35)	15.9 (0.63)	10.4 (0.41)	416.3 (16.39)
Average precipitation days (≥ 1 mm)	1.3	0.6	0.9	1.5	3.1	7.0	9.4	10.9	9.0	6.7	3.4	2.3	56.1
Average afternoon relative humidity (%) (at 15:00)	44	42	42	44	47	51	56	57	53	48	45	46	48
Average dew point °C (°F)	16 (61)	16 (61)	13 (55)	12 (54)	9 (48)	8 (46)	8 (46)	9 (48)	9 (48)	10 (50)	12 (54)	13 (55)	11 (52)
Mean monthly sunshine hours	365.8	294.0	291.4	249.0	213.1	198.0	201.5	229.4	276.0	344.1	345.0	359.6	3,366.9
Mean daily sunshine hours	11.8	10.5	9.4	8.3	6.9	6.6	6.5	7.4	9.2	11.1	11.5	11.6	9.2
Average ultraviolet index	13	12	10	7	5	4	4	5	7	10	12	13	9
Source 1: (Weatherzone) https://www.weatherzone.com.au › ... WA city equals its hottest day of 49.3°C
Source 2: Time and Date (dewpoints 2005–2015) Weather Atlas (sun hours)

== Demographics ==
As of the 2021 census, the population of the Geraldton urban area was 38,595, and in urban Geraldton:

- Aboriginal and Torres Strait Islander people made up 9.7% of the population.
- 65.1% of people were born in Australia. The most common other countries of birth were England 7.7%, New Zealand 2.6%, South Africa 1.5% and Philippines 1.3%.
- 82.7% of people only spoke English at home. Other languages spoken at home included Malay 0.7%, Afrikaans 0.7%, Tagalog 0.5%, Filipino 0.4% and Italian 0.4%.
- The most common responses for religion were No Religion (41.2%), Catholic (22.2%), and Anglican (11.9%).

== Economy ==
The economic output generated within Greater Geraldton, the 12,626-square-kilometre (4,875 sq mi) local government area incorporating Geraldton, is estimated at $2.944 billion. Greater Geraldton represents 56.26% of the $5.233 billion in output generated in Mid West Region and 1.19% of the $247.705 billion in output generated in Western Australia.

=== Port of Geraldton ===
The Port of Geraldton is a major west coast port with seven bulk handling berths (and an average loading rate of seven tonnes per hour), ranking nationally (in tonnage for 2012/2013) 12th in exports (14,812,513); 23rd in imports (632,330); and 13th overall (15,444,843).

The major exports from the Geraldton port in 2012/2013 were (tonnage): iron ore (10,741,662); grain (2,618,507); mineral sands (849,933); copper concentrate (149,450); zinc concentrate (148,420); nickel concentrate (65,919); and livestock (2,758). Major imports were petroleum products (328,021). In 2012/2013 the Geraldton port serviced 328 bulk haulage vessels.

== Tourism ==
=== Visitor Centre ===
The Geraldton Visitor Centre is located in the art gallery on 24 Chapman Road. Its former location was the original Railway Station, a historic building in Geraldton's West End, and was originally built in 1878. It was the first railway station constructed on a Government line in Western Australia.

=== Point Moore Lighthouse ===
The Point Moore Lighthouse, located south of the Geraldton Port is a cultural and historical attraction. It is the oldest surviving Commonwealth lighthouse in Western Australia and was also the first steel tower to be constructed on the mainland of Australia. The Point Moore lighthouse stands 35m tall and its 1000w Tungsten Halogen Lamp can be seen for 23 nautical miles. It began operation in 1878. The tower was prefabricated in Birmingham, England in 1876 and reached Australia by boat in 1877. However, the foundation for the lighthouse was laid at the wrong place by the local contractors and had to be reconstructed at the new site. Currently, it is a heritage-listed structure which is visited by photographers, travellers, couples, artists, etc.

=== Geraldton foreshore and city centre ===
In 2007, the Geraldton foreshore area, previously an abandoned railway marshalling yard, was redeveloped and today hosts a playground with water activities, public green spaces, public beaches, picnic areas, basketball court and shaded play areas. The project was completed in 2008.

Geraldton is a regular port of call for cruise ships with visits occurring approximately ten times per year. Volunteers, organised by the City of Greater Geraldton, greet visitors on arrival to provide information on activities and other assistance.

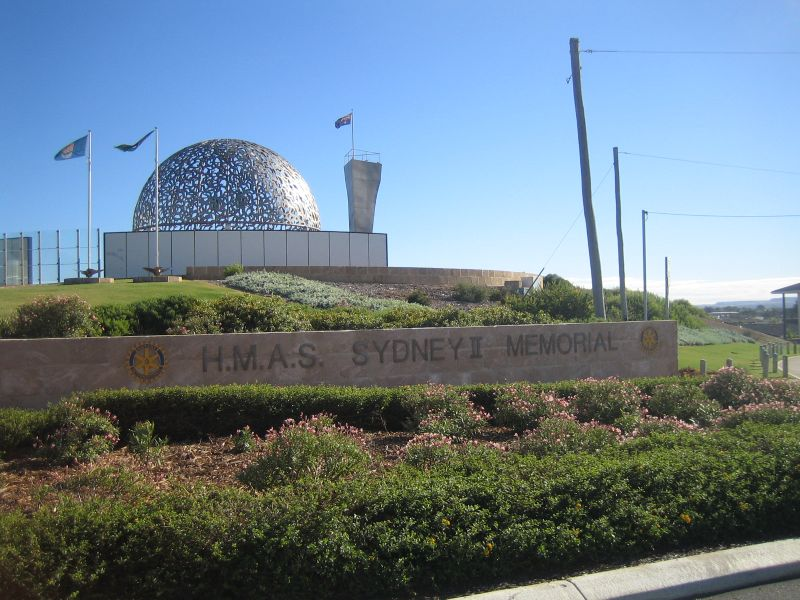
Memorial to HMAS Sydney

=== HMAS Sydney memorial ===
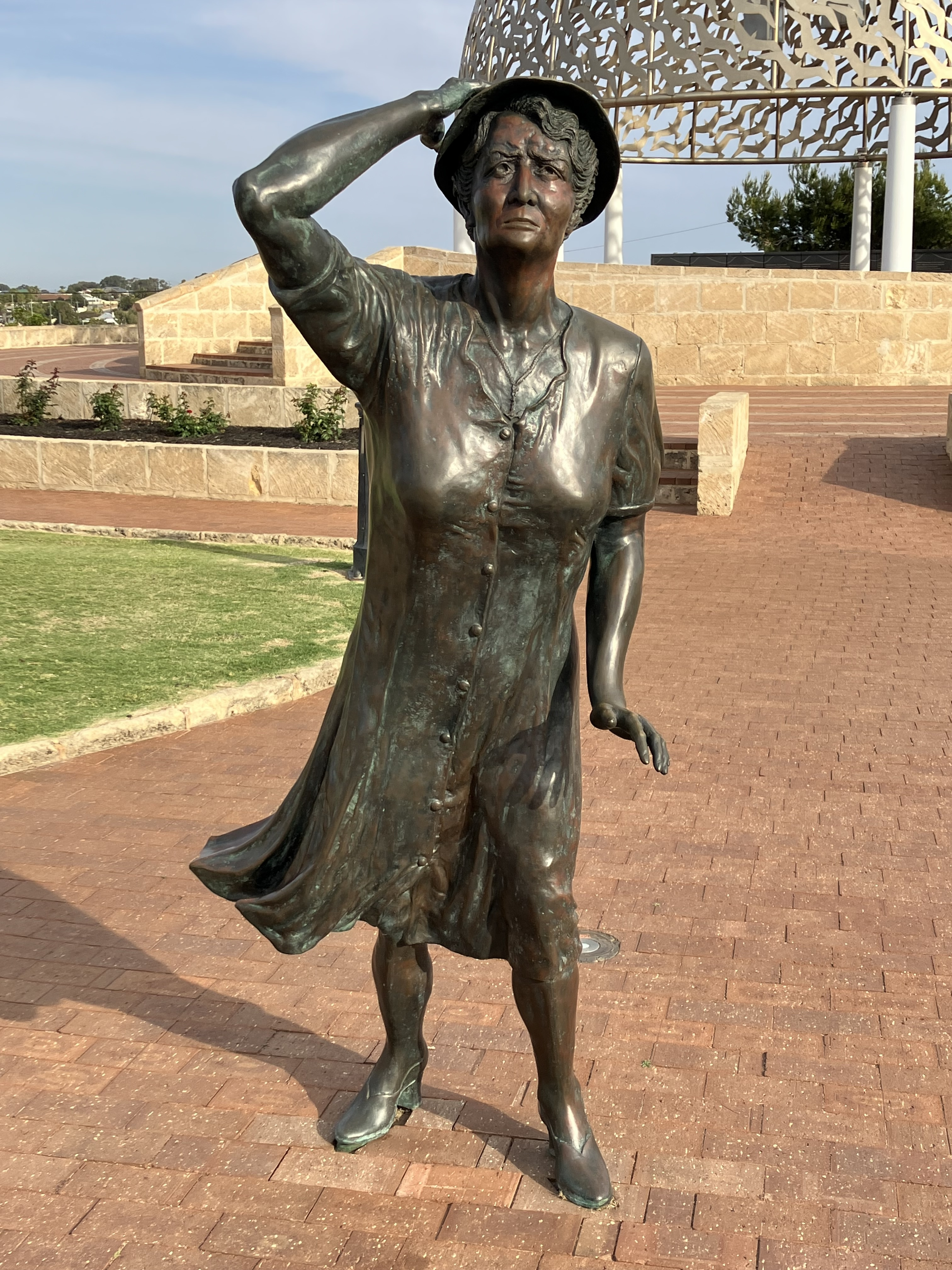
The Waiting Woman sculpture by Joan Walsh-Smith and Charles Smith

The memorial for the World War II cruiser HMAS Sydney is located on Gummer Avenue, at the summit of Mount Scott. The memorial recognises the loss of the light cruiser during a mutually destructive fight with the German auxiliary cruiser Kormoran off Shark Bay in November 1941, with none of the 645 crewmen aboard surviving. A temporary memorial, consisting of a large boulder, a flagpole, and a bronze plaque, was erected in 1998. A permanent memorial was dedicated on 18 November 2001, the day before the 60th anniversary. The HMAS Sydney memorial is made up of four major elements: 1. A stele, based on the ships prow; 2. A granite wall listing the ships company; 3. A bronze statue of a woman looking out to sea and waiting in vain for Sydney to return; and 4. A dome made up of 645 stainless steel seagulls. The 645 stainless steel seagulls represent the souls of the lost sailors. In Folklore, birds such as seagulls are sometimes known as 'soul birds' because they are regarded as the souls of people who died at sea. (Armstrong, 1958) Sydney

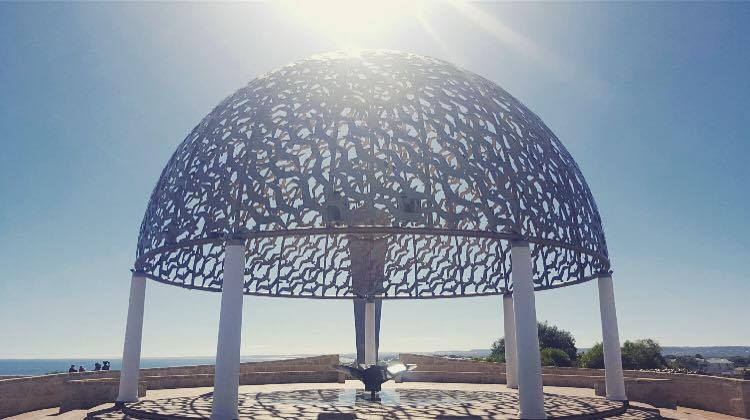
"The Dome of Souls"

In May 2009, the memorial was recognised by the Australian government as being of national significance.

=== Activities ===
The Geraldton foreshore area has pathways for walking, running, cycling, dog-walking, skateboarding and in-line skating. There are skate parks at Cape Burney, Maitland Park, Wonthella, Strathalbyn, Tarcoola Beach, Forrester and Drummond Cove.

Farmers markets occur on Saturday from 8 am to 12 noon in Maitland Park on Cathedral Avenue and on Sunday at the Old railway station on the corner of Chapman Road and Forrest Street.

4WD access is permitted on many beaches around Geraldton. Many beaches are impassable at times around high tide and during periods of ocean surges. At certain times of year, access may become impossible due to beach erosion.

=== Beaches ===
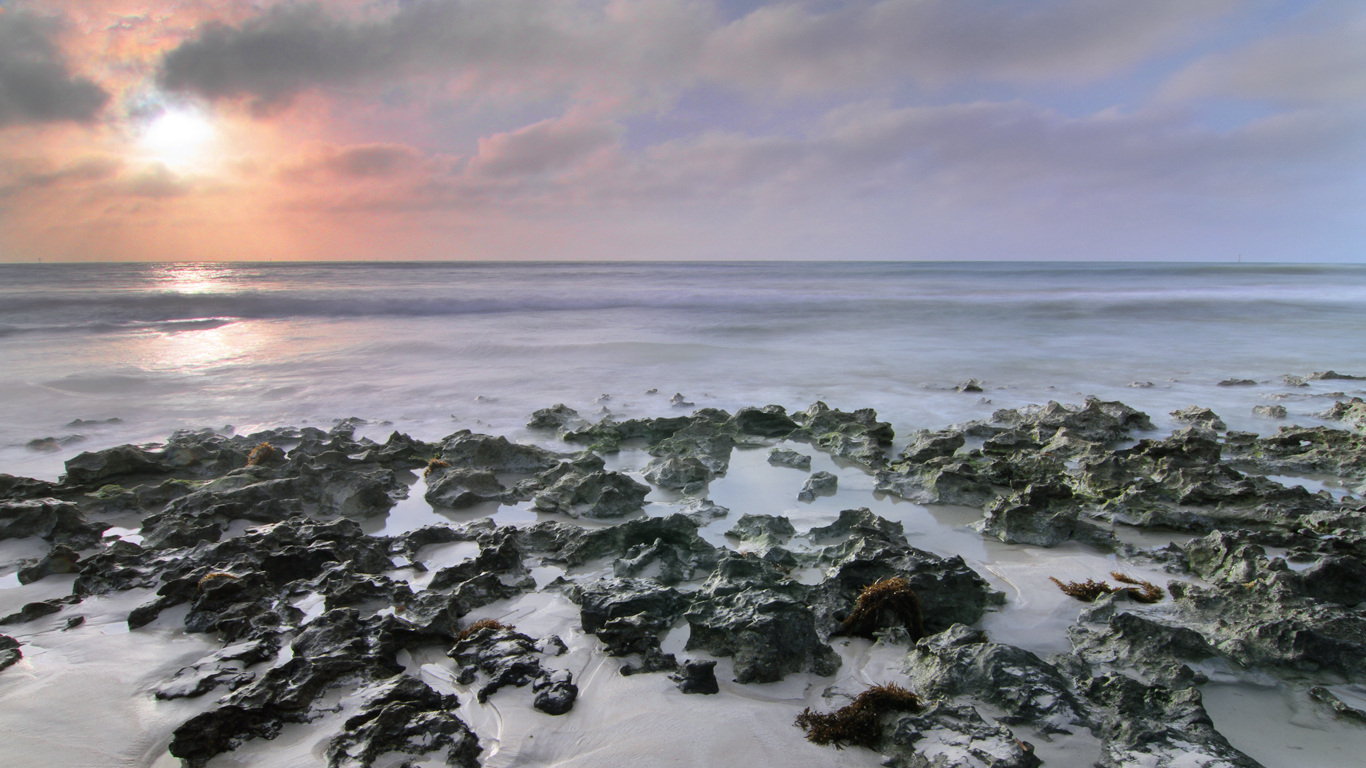
St Georges Beach

The main beaches in Geraldton are Tarcoola Beach, Back Beach, Separation Point, Point Moore, Pages Beach, Town Beach, Champion Bay, St Georges, Sunset Beach and Bluff Point.

== Sport and recreation ==
=== Windsurfing and kitesurfing ===
During the spring, summer and early autumn months from September through April, Geraldton experiences consistent seabreezes. Windsurfing and kitesurfing locations include Back Beach, Separation Point ("Seppos"), Point Moore, Hell's Gate, St. George's and Sunset Beach. The region is a popular windsurfing location, attracting significant numbers of overseas visitors and product testing by manufacturers. In 2005, Geraldton was host to the Australian KiteSurfing Association (AKSA) Australian National Championships.

=== Surfing and stand-up paddlesurfing ===
Surfing, and more recently Stand up paddle surfing, are also popular activities in and around Geraldton. Popular surf spots include Flat Rocks, Greenough, Back Beach, Sunset Beach and Glenfield. Stand-Up Paddlesurfing spots include Point Moore, Town Beach, The Foreshore, St. Georges Beach and Drummond Cove to the north.

In winter, local weather conditions shift to predominantly easterly (offshore) winds. Indian Ocean storms generate large swells that produce good conditions for surfing (though the fringe barrier reef protecting the Geraldton coastline blocks much of the swell, significantly reducing the size of the waves that reach the beaches). Large swells may create potentially dangerous rip currents as water flows through passages between the reef.

=== Fishing, boating and sailing ===
Saltwater fishing, boating and sailing are popular along Geraldton's coastline.

Local and visiting recreational fishermen and women target a wide variety of native sport fish from the beaches and wharves that includes Mulloway, Bream, Tailor, Whiting, Sharks and Cod; larger fish such as Dhufish, Mackerel, Tuna, Snapper, Sampsonfish, Coral Trout and larger sharks, amongst many others are found on Geraldton's offshore reefs, located from approximately 8 km to more than 80 km offshore. A recreational fishing licence is not required when fishing from the shore but a licence must be obtained from the Department of Fisheries to fish from a boat. Significant fines apply for non-compliance. Recreational fishing for local Western Rock Lobster is also permitted during the season from December–April (exact dates vary from year to year) however, a special licence is required. Size and daily bag limits apply to certain species of fish and to all lobster catches.

The city is home to the Geraldton Yacht Club, which marked its 100th anniversary in 2014.

=== Scuba diving and snorkelling ===
Scuba diving and snorkelling are popular activities around Geraldton. There are several wreck diving sites off the coast, including the South Tomi, which was sunk in 2004. The South Tomi is a 58.7-metre long, 9.81-metre wide vessel that was built by Niigata Engineering and Shipping Co Ltd. in Niigata City, Japan. In March 2001, the Republic of Togo registered South Tomi. The same month, the ship was identified fishing illegally in Australian sub-Antarctic waters and pursued by Australian Fisheries officers for 14 days, covering 3,300 nautical miles (approximately 6,100 kilometres). The vessel was boarded by Australian defence forces 320 nautical miles (approximately 600 km) south of Cape Town in South Africa and inspected. The vessel was found to be carrying an illegal catch of protected Patagonian toothfish and the vessel and its catch were confiscated by Australian authorities. The vessel was escorted 8,500 km to Western Australia and arrived on 5 May in Fremantle. The catch was sold by the Australian government for $1.4 million. The City of Geraldton secured the vessel to be sunk as an artificial reef. The ship was towed from Fremantle to Geraldton and scuttled on 18 September 2004 2.9 nautical miles off the Geraldton coast. The site is registered with the WA Department of Fisheries as a wreck and is closed year round to fishing within the defined boundaries – commencing at 28°43.968'S 114°33.392'E, then east to 114°33.206'E, then north to 28°43.752'S, then east to 114°33.392'E, then south to the commencement point. Water depth at the site is approximately 24.5 metres and the deck is 13 metres from the surface. The wreck of the South Tomi provides an easily accessible diving alternative to the nearby Houtman Abrolhos.

=== Team sports ===
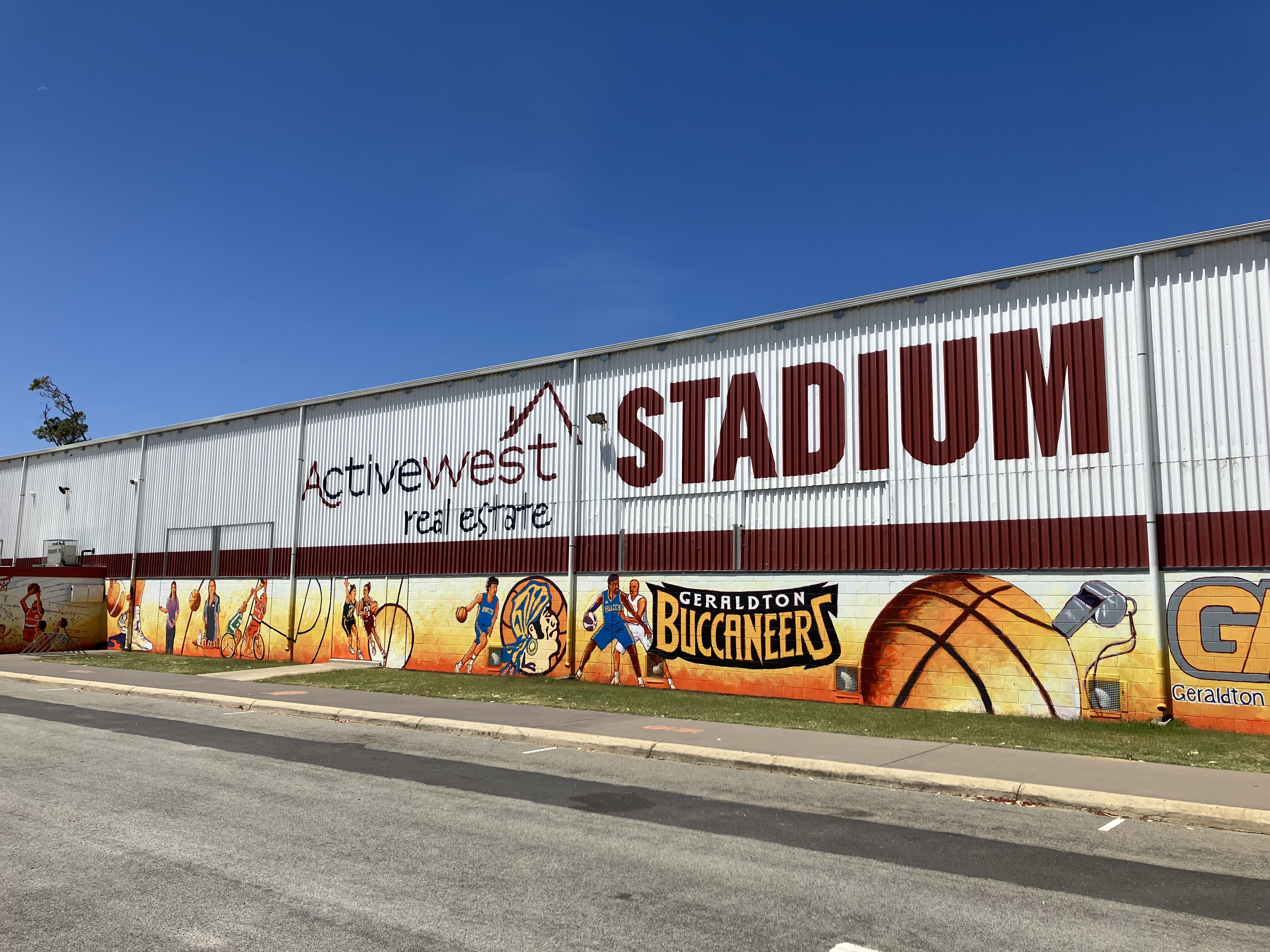
Activewest Stadium in Wonthella, home of the Geraldton Buccaneers

Geraldton has a number of resident sporting teams, including Australian Rules Football, Basketball, Netball, Soccer and Roller Derby League.

The men's basketball team, the Geraldton Buccaneers of the NBL1 West, has been described as the "pride of the city". They play at Activewest Stadium on Eighth Street, where most home games are sold out to capacity with upwards of 2,000 people.

Geraldton is home to the Mid West Academy of Sport, a non-profit community organisation providing support to sporting talent (athletes, coaches, officials and administrators) throughout the Mid West Region of Western Australia.

=== Horse racing ===
Geraldton is home to a horse racing industry and since 1887 has hosted the annual Geraldton Gold Cup meeting.

=== Entertainment ===
Queens Park Theatre is the largest entertainment and conference venue in Geraldton, with a 673-seat auditorium (including box and circle seating), two large foyers with bars, a reception room, and a 500-seat outdoor amphitheatre. The theatre hosts professional events and performances from around the world.

Theatre 8 is an amateur theatre that presents various local talents.

The Orana Cinemas in the historical West End is Geraldton's only cineplex with 3D available on selected movies. During the summer months, a movie is sometimes shown at the side of Dome on Foreshore Drive by Sun City Cinema.

== Events ==
The Geraldton Sunshine Festival, established in 1958, is one of Australia's longest-running festivals. The festival takes place annually in October, celebrating the arrival of Spring and providing opportunities for residents and visitors to engage with local businesses and other organisations.

The Goodness Sustainability and Innovation Festival is held each August in and around Geraldton and showcases and celebrates innovation and achievement towards sustainability in the Mid West.

The Big Sky Readers and Writers Festival – The festival has been hosted by the City of Geraldton and run by The Geraldton Library staff. Australian and International authors come together to share their knowledge and experiences in many ways, from intimate dinners to large scale debates.

== Churches ==
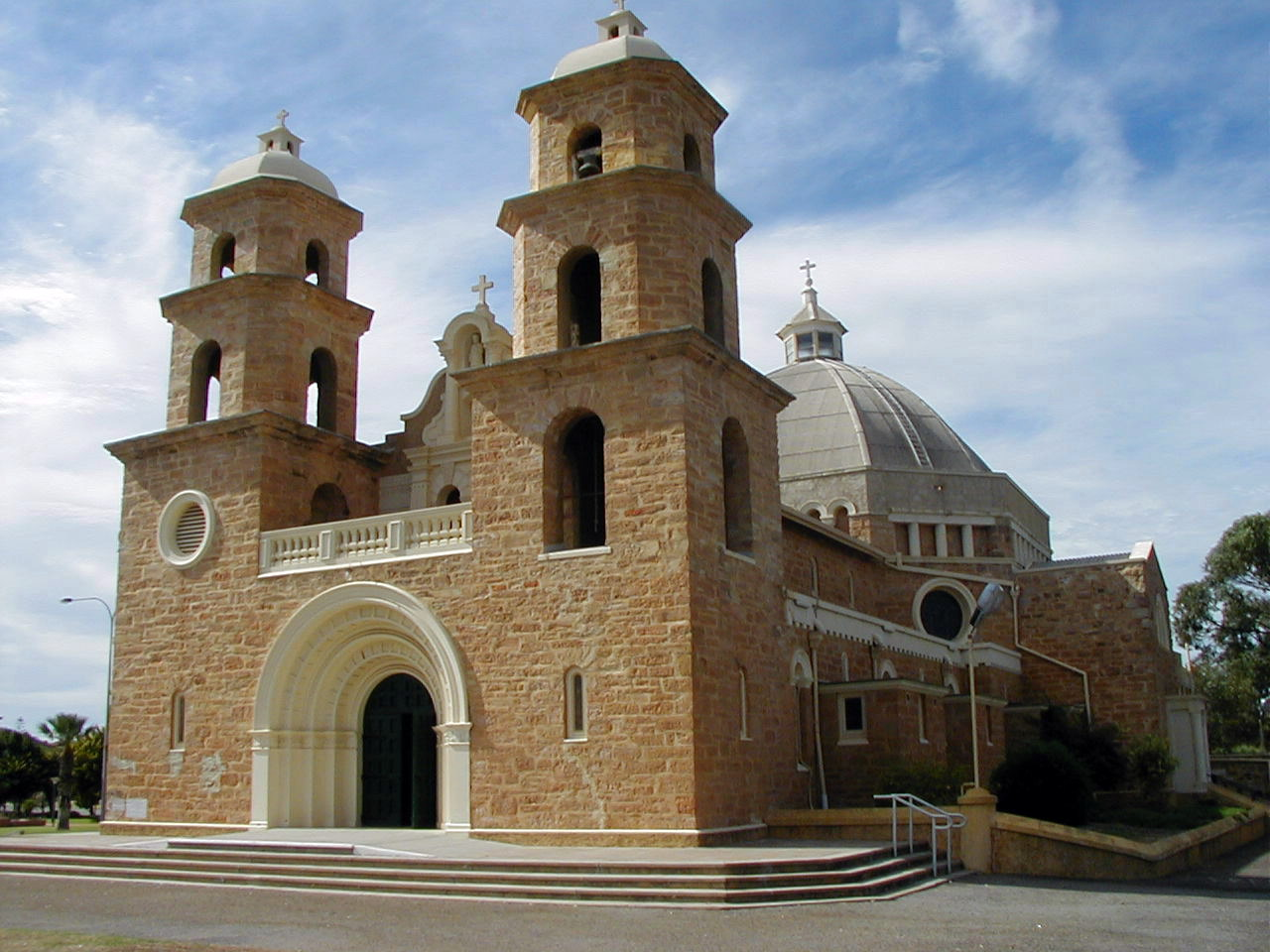
St Francis Xavier Cathedral

The St Francis Xavier Cathedral is the Roman Catholic cathedral of the Diocese of Geraldton. It was designed by the architect and Catholic priest John Hawes. Construction began in 1916 and was completed in 1938.

The Cathedral of the Holy Cross is the Anglican cathedral of the North West Anglican Diocese. It was built during the early 1960s, and "is renowned for having one of the largest areas of stained glass windows in Australia."

== Facilities and services ==
The Greater Geraldton Regional Library is open seven days a week and provides free access to the Internet via a public WiFi hotspot. Other free public WiFi hotspots are available along the Geraldton Foreshore, from the marina to the Esplanade.

The Geraldton Batavia Coast Marina consists of three jetties, 47 commercial and recreation boat pens, 42 floating pens, boat ramps, toilets, carpark, fishing platform and a boardwalk.

Geraldton Volunteer Marine Rescue (active on weekends and public holidays) monitor marine radio frequency 27.88 MHz and VHF Channel 16. Local groups also monitor other frequencies such as 27.90 MHz, 27.91 MHz and VHF channels 72 and 73, as well as their own channels.

The Geraldton Regional Art Gallery opened in 1984 and was one of the first "A Class" regional galleries in Australia.

The Aquarena is a public swimming facility managed by the City of Greater Geraldton. It has 50-metre and 25-metre pools, a leisure pool, a water slide and hydrotherapy facilities, with water polo and swimming squads and group fitness sessions.

The Queen Elizabeth II Centre (QE2) is home to a variety of community and seniors' groups, and offers facilities for public hire, including two large halls with equipped kitchens. The QEII Centre is available for local and visiting seniors, group meetings and also provides an internet hub for seniors.

== Communications ==
Geraldton is host to one of the 121 "points of interconnection" for the Australian National Broadband Network (NBN), providing service to the largest geographic region in Australia. Geraldton was the first regional community in Western Australia where the NBN Fibre to the Premises (FttP) network was deployed in July 2013. NBNCo provides a fixed wireless broadband service for some parts of the region and in 2013/2014 introduced high speed optic fibre broadband services to areas of Geraldton in and near the city centre.

All occupiable premises in Geraldton's urbanised areas between Tarcoola Beach in the south and Drummond Cove in the north are outfitted with NBN Fibre to the Premise services, with construction completed in mid 2017. (Excluding Mandurah) Geraldton is currently (2017) the only regional town in Western Australia with NBN Fibre to the Premise services.

A number of Internet Service Providers offer services to Geraldton that include (where available) Fibre to the Premise (FttP) via NBNCo, private fibre networks (Seacrest Estate), as well as via public spectrum (5.8 GHz Class License) wireless links. Upon completion of the nbn rollout, nearly all copper-based services (ADSL, Frame Relay, Standard Analogue Telephone lines, etc.) were decommissioned and are no longer available.

In 2012, the City of Greater Geraldton was one of 33 cities worldwide selected to receive a Smarter Cities® Challenge grant from IBM. The stated aim of the project is to "identify smart digital services and opportunities that leverage the increasing availability of broadband and to develop smart energy strategies that will enable the community's vision of becoming a carbon-neutral region by 2029".

The region is serviced by the major mobile phone companies with 4G networks provided by Telstra, Optus and Vodafone.

== Healthcare ==
Geraldton has two hospitals: Geraldton Regional Hospital (GRH) (public) and St John of God Hospital (SJOGH) (private). Geraldton Regional Hospital is the only facility in Geraldton with a 24-hour Emergency Room.

Geraldton Regional Hospital is a 55-bed hospital comprising accident and emergency, medical, surgical, paediatrics, maternity, intensive nursing, chemotherapy unit, day surgery and a renal dialysis unit.

Allied health services (speech pathology, psychology, physiotherapy, occupational therapy, pharmacy and audiology) are also available at the hospital.

St John of God Hospital is a 60-bed hospital with medical, surgical, acute care, maternity and palliative care. There is also an adjoining specialist centre where residential specialists are based. This included three general surgeons, radiologists, an orthopaedic surgeon, two obstetrician/gynaecologists, an ophthalmologist, GPs and anaesthetists. Visiting specialists consulting rooms are also based here.

There are 42 private general practitioners resident in Geraldton, including four general practitioners employed by the Geraldton Regional Aboriginal Medical Service (GRAMS). Most of the GPs and resident specialists in Geraldton are involved in teaching Rural Clinical School medical students.

Community services include the Aboriginal Medical Service, the Community Drug Service Team, the Community Health and Development Centre, and the Community Mental Health Team.

== Education ==
=== Tertiary education ===
The Geraldton Universities Centre is an independent, not-for-profit, incorporated body, supporting university courses in Geraldton on behalf of a range of universities including CQUniversity, Charles Sturt University and the University of Southern Queensland. The centre is an Australian first with university places allocated specifically for Geraldton, allowing students to study locally while living and working in the Mid West. The majority of graduates now work in regional Western Australia. The student body has grown from 20 student places in 2001 to more than 200 enrolled students in 2015, undertaking a range of bridging and full degree programs.

Central Regional TAFE (formerly Durack Institute of Technology) is a college of TAFE providing education, training programs and services to the community including school leavers, mature age students, industry/corporate groups, international students, employers and those who study for their own personal and professional development.

The Batavia Coast Maritime Institute (BCMI), a subsidiary of Central Regional TAFE, is a training, research and development facility located at Separation Point in Geraldton.

=== Primary and secondary schools and colleges ===
School	Year range	Funding
Allendale Primary School	K–6	Public
Beachlands Primary School	K–6	Public
Bluff Point Primary School	K–6	Public
Geraldton Primary School	K–6	Public
Leaning Tree Steiner School	Pre–K–9	Private
Mt Tarcoola Primary School	K–6	Public
Rangeway Primary School	K–6	Public
St Francis Xavier Primary School	K–6	Private
St Lawrence's School Bluff Point	K–6	Private
St John's School Rangeway	K–6	Private
Waggrakine Primary School	K–6	Public
Wandina Primary School	K–6	Public
Champion Bay Senior High School	7–12	Public
Geraldton Senior High School	7–12	Public
Geraldton Grammar School	K–12	Private
Nagle Catholic College	7–12	Private
Geraldton Christian College	K–12	Private

== Nearby ==
The Houtman Abrolhos islands are 60 kilometres (37 mi) west of Geraldton.

The Murchison Radio-astronomy Observatory Support Facility in Geraldton, operated by CSIRO, provides support services for the Square Kilometre Array project located at the Murchison Radio-astronomy Observatory, 315 km northeast of Geraldton.

The Australian Defence Satellite Communications Station is located at Kojarena, 30 km east of Geraldton.

== Transport ==
Geraldton has a public bus service run by TransGeraldton and is connected to Perth with coach services provided by Transwa. QantasLink and Nexus Airlines provide commercial services from Geraldton Airport; Several charter companies provide tourist charter flights and services to the mining industry. The airport is also used for general aviation. The airport provides multiple daily flights to and from Perth, operated by QantasLink and Nexus Airlines. General aviation services include charter flights to the Abrolhos Islands, to WA minesites and to various tourist destinations. Flight training schools, aircraft maintenance facilities and a local aero club are based here. Construction is underway as of 2014 on an Airport Technology Park.

== Media ==
=== Radio ===
Radio services available in Geraldton:

- Vision Christian Radio (87.8FM) – Christian talk and music
- Tourist Radio (88.0FM) – (Information for travellers and tourists)
- TAB Radio (88.6FM) – Racing and sport
- 6 TTT (97.3FM) – (Community Access Radio Station)
- ABC Midwest & Wheatbelt (6GN 828 AM) – Part of the ABC Local Radio Network.
- Radio National – (6ABCRN 99.7 FM) – Speciality talk and music.
- Triple J – (6JJJ 98.9 FM) – Music for young Australians (non-commercial, ABC affiliate)
- ABC News Radio – (6PNN 101.3 FM) – Rolling News bulletins, news magazine programs and LIVE coverage from Federal Parliament House of Representatives.
- ABC Classic – (6ABCFM 94.9 FM) – Classical and Jazz Music.
- WAFM (96.5FM) – Top 40 Music
- The Spirit Network (Radio 6BAY FM 98.1/1512 AM) – Classic Hits / Adult Contemporary Music format aimed at 35 years + audience.
- Radio Mama – 100.5FM – Indigenous Community station

=== Television ===
Free-to-Air Television services:

- ABC
- SBS
- Seven Regional WA (formerly GWN7)
- WIN Television (Nine)
- West Digital Television (10)

The programming schedule is mainly the same as the Seven, Nine and Ten stations in Perth, with variations for news bulletins, sport telecasts such as the Australian Football League and National Rugby League, children's and lifestyle programs and advertorials. Seven produces a 30-minute regional news program each weeknight (originating from Bunbury) with a newsroom based in Geraldton, covering the local area.

=== Newspapers ===
The Geraldton Guardian was established in 1878 as the Victorian Express and is the state's second oldest extant newspaper in continuous circulation (after The West Australian). It is published on Tuesday and Friday.

Yamaji News, published since 1995 by the Yamaji Languages Aboriginal Corporation, is a fortnightly Geraldton newspaper presenting issues and stories affecting indigenous people in the Gascoyne and Murchison districts.

The Midwest Times is published on Wednesday and is issued free to residents and businesses in the Geraldton and the Mid West.

== Notable residents ==
- Liam Anthony (1987– ), Australian rules footballer
- Alfred Carson (1859–1944), journalist and social worker
- Edith Cowan (1861–1932), the first woman elected to an Australian Parliament, was born and raised at Glengarry Station
- Patricia Gallaher OAM (1937–2014), regional librarian established the Randolph Stow award for young writers
- Geoff Gallop (1951– ), 27th Premier of Western Australia
- Nene Gare (1919–1994), her novel The Fringe Dwellers was inspired by and set in Geraldton
- Xavier Herbert (1901–1984), Miles Franklin Award-winning writer, was born here
- Brenda Hodge, the last person sentenced to death in Australia. Her sentence was commuted when WA abolished the death penalty; she was eventually released from prison and now lives in Geraldton.
- Chris Mainwaring (1965–2007), an Australian rules footballer, inaugural player for the West Coast Eagles
- Jack Martin (1995– ), Australian rules footballer
- Stephen McCann (1958–), Australian rules footballer
- Judd McVee (2003–), Australian rules footballer
- Johny Narkle (2001– ), basketball player
- Doris Pilkington (1937–2014), author best known for her 1996 book Follow the Rabbit-Proof Fence
- Graham Polak (1984-), Australian rules footballer
- Liam Ryan (1996– ), Australian rules footballer
- Paddy Ryder (1988—), Australian rules footballer
- Lieutenant General John Sanderson (1940– ), 29th Governor of Western Australia, former Chief of the Australian Army
- Brett Sheehan (1979– ), Rugby Union player for Reds, Waratahs and Western Force
- Holden Sheppard (1988–), Author
- Randolph Stow (1935–2010), Miles Franklin Award-winning novelist. His The Merry-Go-Round in the Sea was set in the Geraldton area in the 1940s
- Harry Taylor (1986– ), Australian rules footballer, 2 x Premiership player for the Geelong Cats and 2 x All Australian.
- Tasma Walton (1973– ), a television and film actress, wife of Australian comedian, television presenter and producer Rove McManus
- John Willcock (1879–1956), 15th Premier of Western Australia
- Sir Ronald Wilson (1922–2005), Justice of the High Court of Australia, President of the Human Rights and Equal Opportunity Commission
- Sir Albert Wolff (1899–1977), Chief Justice of Western Australia, Lieutenant Governor of Western Australia

== See also ==
- City of Greater Geraldton
