= Malgana people =

Indigenous people of Western Australia

The Malgana, also known as the Malkana, are an Aboriginal Australian people of Western Australia.

== Language ==
Malgana belongs to the Kartu language family. It died out by the mid-20th century, but a salvage grammar of the language, based on old recordings and records, was produced by Andrew Gargett in 2011.

== Country ==
The Malgana in Norman Tindale's estimation had tribal lands of some 7,000 square miles (18,000 km^{2}). He located their traditional lands as lying on the inland plateau from Hamelin Pool south of the Wooramel River area. He placed their eastern confines around the Talisker pastoral lease, and their southern limits near Ajana, Coolcalalaya, and Riverside in the Murchison River area. The Nhanda lay to their south, with the border boundary between the two near the present day Gee Gie Outcamp, while their northern neighbours were the Yingkarta.

In 2018 much of the Shark Bay area, contiguous land extending over Dirk Hartog Island National Park, Edel Land Peninsula and Steep Point, the town of Denham, Peron Peninsula, and some pastoral leases, was recognised as coming under Malgana traditional territory in a native title decision.

== People ==
The Malgana were by Tindale's time a small tribe, who, with the changes brought about by colonial settlement, somewhat overshadowed by the neighbouring Tedei and Inggarda. They did not practise ritual circumcision, unlike the tribes to their east. They appear to have shared several customs with the tribes formally grouped under the generic name Kakarakala, namely the Yinikutira, Baiyungu, Maia, and Yingkarda.

The Malgana used to dig water traps by creating water soaks during the wet season, and conserving the water supply over the dry periods from evaporation and use by animals by covering the sites with stones.

== History of contact ==
Modern settlement by European colonists in Malgana territory began in 1874, when the estimated local population was 200. However, it is quite possible that the Malgana had had occasion to encounter white people centuries before that time. The Dutch trading ship Zuytdorp, while on route to Batavia, was wrecked in this area in 1712, at a site known as the Zuytdorp Cliffs. In Malgana tradition, accounts of a shipwreck and of the survivors were narrated, and British colonists were told of the circumstances over a century later. According to this oral tradition, the survivors constructed two sizeable houses, and three outhouses, above the cliffs near where their ship had sunk, made of salvaged wood and canvas, and exchanged reserves of food for native hunting implements.

== Native title ==
In a native title determination on 4 December 2018, the Malgana were recognised as having rights to roughly 28,800 square kilometres (11,100 sq mi) of land and waters in the World Heritage Site area around Shark Bay in the Gascoyne region. The decision was handed down by Justice Bernard Murphy. The decision came two decades after the first application for native title by the Malgana made on 30 March 1998, and accords the people exclusive rights to occupy, hunt and fish in the zone and unexclusive rights to camp, build shelters and travel unhampered through the area.

== Some words ==
- mama/mamadi = father
- nanga/ngangga =mother
- duthu = (wild?) dog (Note: Barlee provides two words:doodoota "wild dog" and manghana (tame dog). In Gargett's transcription the word for "dog" is rendered as duthu.)

== Sources ==
- "AIATSIS map of Indigenous Australia". AIATSIS. 14 May 2024.
- Barlee, Frederick (1886). "Shark's Bay: The Majanna Tribe". In Curr, Edward Micklethwaite (ed.). The Australian race: its origin, languages, customs, place of landing in Australia and the routes by which it spread itself over the continent (PDF). Vol. 1. Melbourne: J. Ferres. pp. 306–309.
- Blevins, Juliette (2001). Nhanda: An Aboriginal Language of Western Australia. University of Hawaii Press. ISBN 978-0-824-82375-7.
- Dash, Mike (2011) [First published 2003]. Batavia's Graveyard: The True Story of the Mad Heretic Who Led History's Bloodiest Mutiny. Hachette UK. ISBN 978-1-780-22058-1.
- Gargett, Andrew D. (2011). A Salvage Grammar of Malgana, the Language of Shark Bay, Western Australia. Pacific Linguistics. ISBN 978-0-858-83632-7.
- "20-years in the making, the Gascoyne's Malgana people celebrate native title". National Indigenous Times. 11 December 2018.
- Playford, Phillip E. (1996). Carpet of Silver: The Wreck of the Zuytdorp. University of Western Australia Press. ISBN 978-1-875-56085-1.
- "Tindale Tribal Boundaries" (PDF). Department of Aboriginal Affairs, Western Australia. September 2016. Archived from the original (PDF) on 8 March 2016.
- Tindale, Norman Barnett (1974). "Malgana (WA)". Aboriginal Tribes of Australia: Their Terrain, Environmental Controls, Distribution, Limits, and Proper Names. Australian National University. ISBN 978-0-708-10741-6. Archived from the original on 20 March 2020.
- "Zuytdorp (1712/06/09) North of Kalbarri". Shipwreck Databases. Western Australian Museum.
