= Nor 6 =

Shipwreck in Western Australia

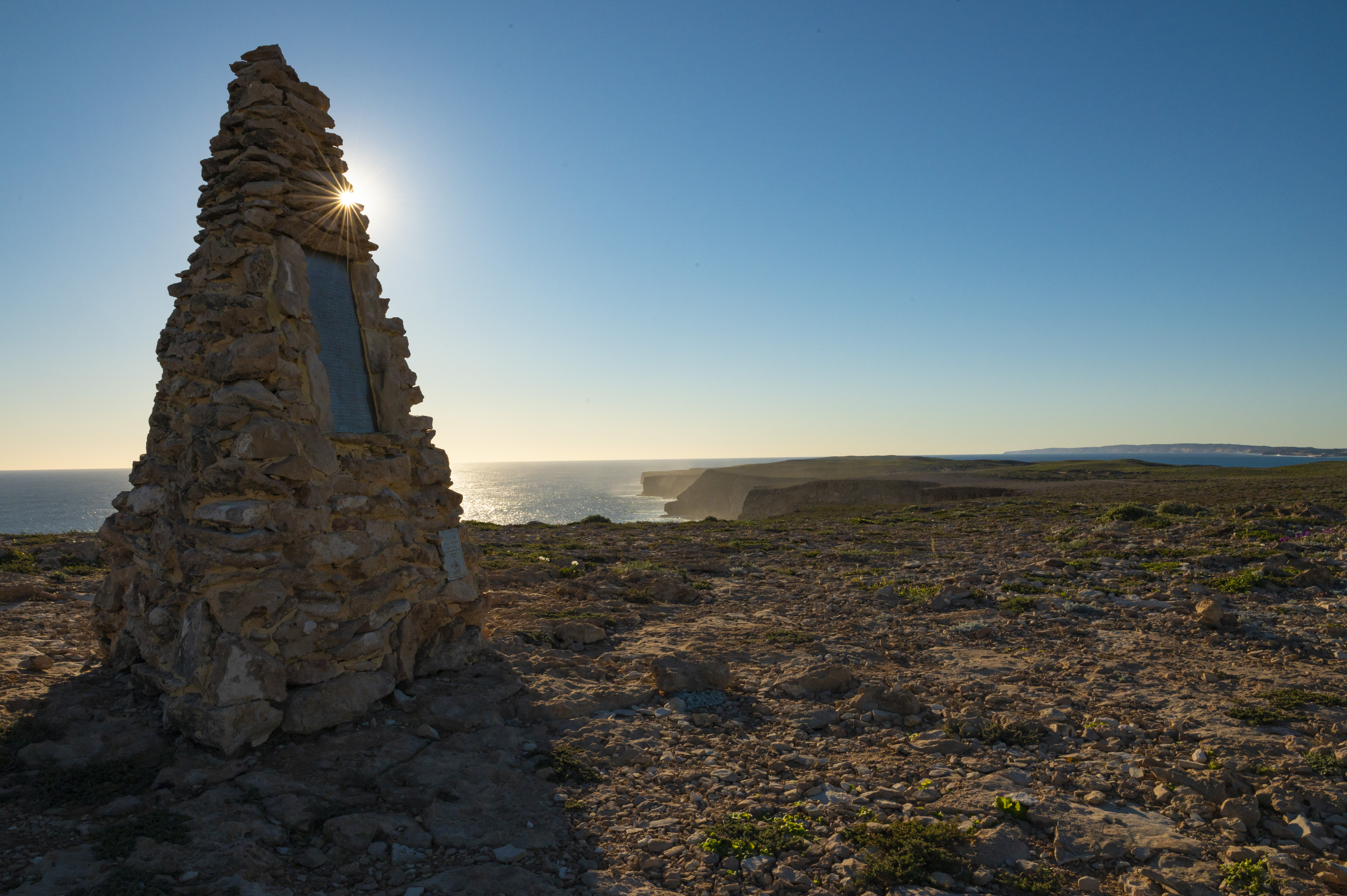
- Nor 6 memorial at Steep Point in Edel Land National Park

History

Australia
- Fate: Sunk on 25 April 1963 after a collision with the Zuytdorp Cliffs

Nor 6 was a prawn trawler that sank on 25 April 1963 (Note: Depending on source, 24 and 26 April are also quoted as date of sinking but the official enquiry states 25 April.) after a collision with the Zuytdorp Cliffs off the coast of Western Australia.

The crew of the ship, on her maiden voyage, consisted of skipper Jack Drinan as well as Ron Poole and Barry Allen, both from Brisbane, and Tony Romasanta from South Fremantle.

At the time of sinking, 5 am, three of the four crew members, including the skipper, were asleep, with Poole at the helm of the vessel.

After a five day search, the wreck of the trawler was found 19 kilometres (12 mi) south of False Entrance Point by an aircraft of the Nor-West Whaling company, without any sign of the crew.

Drinan, however, survived the sinking of the trawler and was able to reach a floating ice box from the boat, breaking a hole into the box. Drinan claimed to have heard the other crew members shouting for him from the shore at the time of sinking. Drinan survived on 20 oranges, nine raw eggs and by licking water from the lid of the ice box for the next 14 days. With a shovel and hammer as his only tools, he cut the lid of the ice box in half to obtain a raft. An initial attempt to reach the shore on the small raft on the fourteenth day failed but he made another attempt the following day. Drinan reached the shore at the south passage lighthouse, not far from where Nor 6 sunk, but was unable to find any food or help. He returned to sea with his raft and was eventually spotted and rescued by the trawler Sonoma. A land search for the missing men was briefly resumed in mid-May after a report of sightings along the coast which turned out to be station hands.

Drinan subsequently had his skipper's ticket suspended for 12 months by a maritime court in Fremantle in August 1963. In a three-day inquiry, Drinan was found to have failed in his duty in the management and navigation of the ship. The magistrate established that only one bearing had been taken during the ship's journey from Geraldton to the location of its sinking. At the time, mapping of the area was incomplete and ships were still using the century-old survey maps of HMS Herald. The ruling against Drinan faced some criticism; it was pointed out that the coast of Western Australia between Geraldton and the location of the sinking offered few landmarks to take bearings from, and the last ten hours of the journey were in darkness, with Drinan off duty and asleep.

The raft Drinan used to reach land has been preserved in the collection of the Western Australian Museum. The remains of the ice box are held by the Shire of Shark Bay, while a memorial stands along the top of the cliffs just south of Steep Point.
