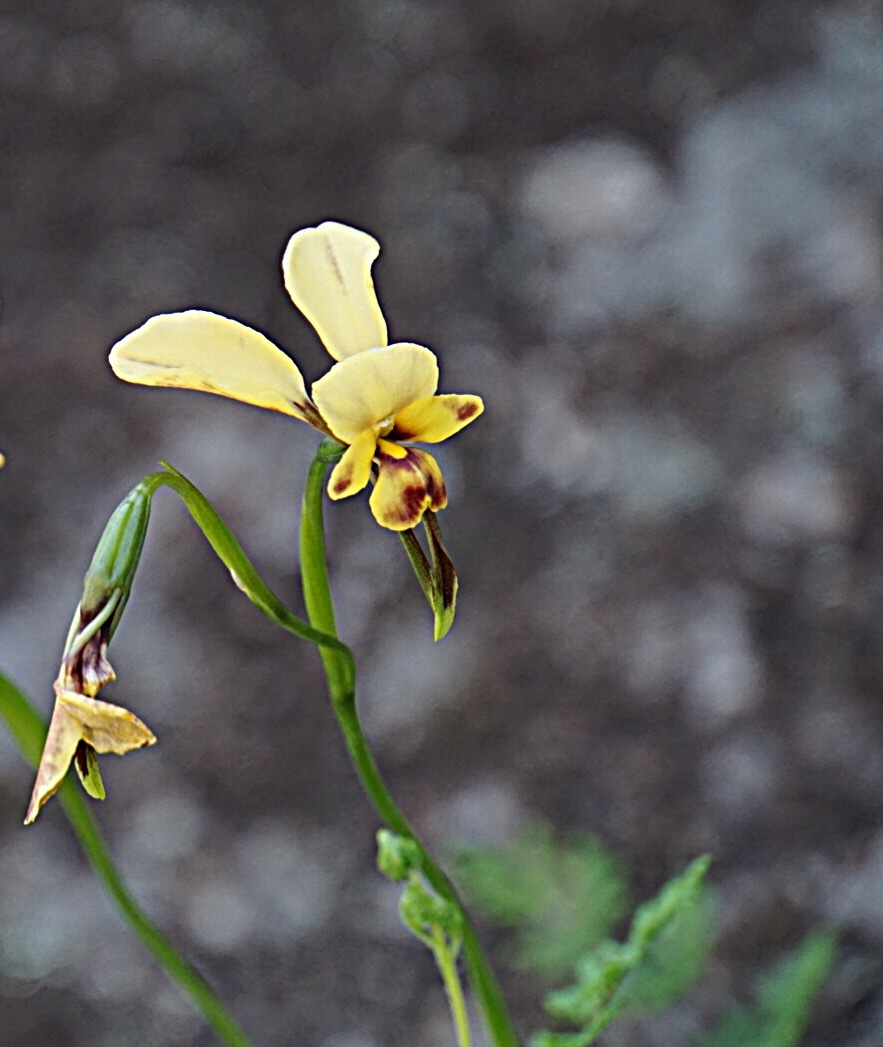
- Near Kalbarri

Scientific classification
- Kingdom: Plantae
- Clade: Tracheophytes
- Clade: Angiosperms
- Clade: Monocots
- Order: Asparagales
- Family: Orchidaceae
- Subfamily: Orchidoideae
- Tribe: Diurideae
- Genus: Diuris
- Species: D. oraria

Binomial name
- Diuris oraria D.L.Jones & C.J.French

= Diuris oraria =

Northern coastal donkey orchid

Species of orchid

Diuris oraria, commonly known as northern coastal donkey orchid, is a species of orchid that is endemic to a small area of the north coast of Western Australia. It has two or three linear to lance-shaped leaves and up to four yellow flowers with reddish-brown and purple markings.

== Description ==
Diuris oraria is a tuberous, perennial herb with two or three linear leaves 100–150 mm (3.9–5.9 in) long and 5–10 mm (0.20–0.39 in) wide. Up to four yellow flowers with brown and reddish-brown and purple markings, 25–30 mm (0.98–1.18 in) long and 20–25 mm (0.79–0.98 in) wide are borne on a flowering stem 150–300 mm (5.9–11.8 in) tall. The dorsal sepal is egg-shaped, 7–10 mm (0.28–0.39 in) long and 12–15 mm (0.47–0.59 in) wide, the lateral sepals narrowly oblong, parallel or crossed, 13–18 mm (0.51–0.71 in) long and 2.5–3.0 mm (0.098–0.118 in) wide. The petals are broadly elliptic to round, 12–16 mm (0.47–0.63 in) long and 9–13 mm (0.35–0.51 in) wide on a stalk 3–4 mm (0.12–0.16 in) long. The labellum is 7–10 mm (0.28–0.39 in) long with three lobes - the centre lobe broadly wedge-shaped, 7–9 mm (0.28–0.35 in) long and wide, the side lobes spread widely apart and oblong, 7–9 mm (0.28–0.35 in) long and 4–6 mm (0.16–0.24 in) wide. There is a single smooth, yellow callus ridge 3–4 mm (0.12–0.16 in) long, along the mid-line of the labellum. Flowering occurs from late July to late August.

== Taxonomy and naming ==
Diuris oraria was first formally described in 2016 by David Jones and Christopher J. French in Australian Orchid Review, from a specimen collected by French near the western end of the State Barrier Fence in 1999. The specific epithet (oraria) means "of the coast", referring to the coastal or near-coastal distribution of this species.

== Distribution and habitat ==
Northern coastal donkey orchid grows in coastal and near-coastal areas on shallow sand over limestone from south of Kalbarri to north of the Zuytdorp Cliffs in the Geraldton Sandplains and Yalgoo bioregions of Western Australia.

== Conservation ==
Diuris oraria is listed as "not threatened" by the Western Australian Government Department of Biodiversity, Conservation and Attractions.
