= Baiyungu =

Indigenous Australian people

The Baiyungu are an Aboriginal Australian people of the Gascoyne region of Western Australia.

== Country ==
According to Norman Tindale's figures, the Baiyungu occupied some 4,000 square miles (10,000 km^{2}) on the Lower Lyndon and Minilya River, running in a southwesterly direction from the salt marshland down to Quobba. He puts their eastern frontier at Winning Pool, while stating that their northern extension went as far as the area of Giralia and Bullara, falling short of the coastal areas up to and near the at North West Cape on the Exmouth Gulf.

== Alternative names ==
- Baijungo
- Baiong, Baiung, Biong
- Kakarakala ("eastern fires"): This is a generic ethnonym subsuming several tribes from Shark Bay to the North West Cape under one rubric, and apparently arose from its use in this sense among the Mandi. Apart from the Baiyungu, three other tribes came under this heading: the Inggarda, the Maia and the Yinikutira.
- Paiunggu, Bayungu
- Payungu

== Some words ==
- tauara (totem centre) (Note: "The Murinbata term dar, interpreted as country, can be used in western Arnhem Land for a given clan area with its surrounding horde territory, but may also denote the horde territory alone. There is a resemblance between the term dar and such words as taurai, the hunting territory of the Kumbainggiri; tjar meaning land, earth, or soil among the Wotjobaluk; taura ground, among the Ngarigo; and tauara meaning totem centre among the Baijungu of Western Australia." (Tindale 1974, p. 17))

== Sources ==
- "AIATSIS map of Indigenous Australia". AIATSIS. 14 May 2024.
- Dench, Alan (1998). Yingkarta. Lincom Europa. pp. 1–82.
- "Tindale Tribal Boundaries" (PDF). Department of Aboriginal Affairs, Western Australia. September 2016. Archived from the original (PDF) on 8 March 2016.
- Tindale, Norman Barnett (1974). "Baijungu (WA)". Aboriginal Tribes of Australia: Their Terrain, Environmental Controls, Distribution, Limits, and Proper Names. Australian National University Press. ISBN 978-0-708-10741-6. Archived from the original on 24 September 2019.
