= Acacia cavealis =

Scientific classification
- Kingdom: Plantae
- Clade: Tracheophytes
- Clade: Angiosperms
- Clade: Eudicots
- Clade: Rosids
- Order: Fabales
- Family: Fabaceae
- Subfamily: Caesalpinioideae
- Clade: Mimosoid clade
- Genus: Acacia
- Species: A. cavealis

Binomial name
- Acacia cavealis R.S.Cowan & Maslin
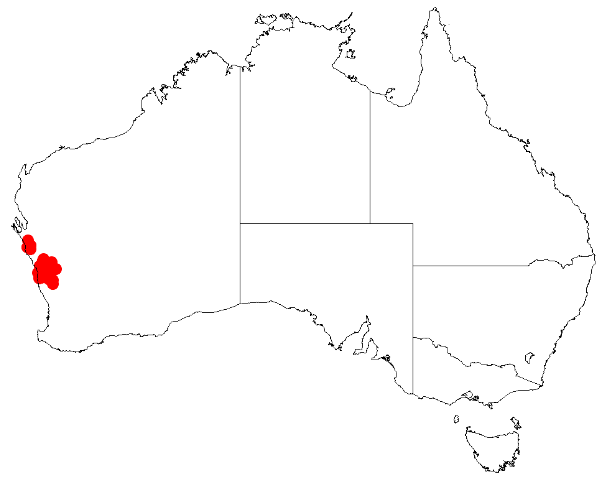
- Occurrence data from AVH

Synonyms
- Racosperma caveale (R.S.Cowan & Maslin) Pedley

Species of legume

Acacia cavealis is a species of flowering plant in the family Fabaceae and is endemic to an area in the southwest of Western Australia. It is an open, spreading or sprawling shrub with linear phyllodes sometimes in clusters of two or three, spherical heads of golden yellow flowers, and linear, leathery to more or less woody pods.

== Description ==
Acacia cavealis is an open spreading or sprawling shrub that typically grows to a height of mostly 30–70 cm (12–28 in). It has branchlets that are covered in matted hair or with hairs embedded in resin giving them a cobweb-like appearance. Its phyllodes are linear, 10–35 mm (0.39–1.38 in) long and 1.0–1.8 mm (0.039–0.071 in) wide, sometimes in clusters of two or three, flat to almost circular in cross section, more or less rigid with three veins on each surface. There are narrowly triangular stipules up to 2.2 mm (0.087 in) long at the base of the phyllodes. The flowers are borne in two spherical heads in axils, on a peduncle 7–12 mm (0.28–0.47 in) long. The heads are 3.5–5 mm (0.14–0.20 in) in diameter with mostly 12 to 18 golden yellow flowers. Flowering has been recorded from October to February and from April to June, and the pods are linear, up to 45 mm (1.8 in) long, 3.0–3.5 mm (0.12–0.14 in) wide and leathery to somewhat woody containing broadly elliptic, mottled brown and brownish-grey seeds about 2.5 mm (0.098 in) long, with a club-shaped aril.

== Taxonomy ==
Acacia cavealis was first formally described in 1999 by Richard Cowan and Bruce Maslin in the journal Nuytsia from specimens collected at Arrowsmith Lake by Alex George in 1974. The specific epithet (cavealis) is derived from a Latin word meaning 'hollow' or 'hole', referring to the "elliptic-oblong chambers in the pods" in which the seeds of this species are borne.

== Distribution and habitat ==
This species of wattle is native to near-coastal areas between Zuytdorp Cliffs and Watheroo where it grows in sand in heath, shrubland and low open woodland in the Avon Wheatbelt and Geraldton Sandplains bioregions of south-western Western Australia.

== Conservation status ==
Acacia cavealis is listed as "not threatened" by the Government of Western Australia Department of Biodiversity, Conservation and Attractions.

== See also ==
- List of Acacia species
