= Yingkarta =

Indigenous people of Western Australia

The Yingkarta or Yingarda people, also written Inggarda and Ingarda, are an Aboriginal Australian people of the Gascoyne region of Western Australia.

== Language ==
Yinggarda was a Kartu language spoken from the coastal area around Carnarvon through the Gascoyne River to the junction and southwards to the Wooramel River. The earliest record of the languages dates from material collected by an anonymous source and forwarded by Edric Gifford to Edward Curr, who published a list of basic words in 1886.

There were two dialects, a northern and southern variety, with marked lexical differences. Down to the end of the 20th century, it was reported that the Carnarvon community had a wide knowledge of Yingarda words, but that their use was somewhat restricted. Given the movement of Wadjarri into this area, a people with whom the Yinggarda maintained strong links, the young mix the two vocabularies.

== Country ==
The Yingkarta's lands, lying between the Gascoyne and Wooramel Rivers in a wedge of land separating those of the Tedei to their south, and of their northern neighbours the Mandi. Their inland extension, from the northern area of Shark Bay, ran as far east as the vicinity of Red Hill and Gascoyne Junction. Alan Dench also lists among their northern neighbours the Baiyungu, Maia, Tharrkari and Warriyangga, while stating the Malgana lay to their south, and the Wadjarri to their east.

According to Norman Tindale's estimation, this territory covered about 4,200 square miles (11,000 km^{2}).

== History of contact ==
The people where first mentioned in the journal of the shipwrecked Batavia in 1628. Later contact with Dutch merchants may include abandoned mutineers who mentioned in later reports living among the local people. White colonial occupation of Yingkarta lands began in 1877 when the indigenous population was estimated to number some 2,000 people. Smallpox was common among them.

== Social organisation and rites ==
It is not known whether or not the Yinggarda had a section system. A. R. Radcliffe-Brown, writing in 1930, stated of them that:

In the case of the Ingarda tribe to the south of the Gascoyne River it was impossible to determine if they really had or had not a section system. They knew the names of the sections of the Maia and Warienga [Warriyangka] tribes and every man claimed membership of a particular section. ... They might once have had such a system which had broken down or they might merely be trying to adapt themselves as well as possible to the social organisation of the neighbouring tribes. When the data was collected in 1911, little was remembered of their marriage systems and Alan Dench thinks it probable, unlike many neighbouring tribes to their north, they did not have a moieties.

The Yingkarta were said by some early explorers to have practised circumcision. (Note: "Among the Angaardies, circumcision is performed by of a sharp flint, and after the consummation of the rite, the youth is forbidden to look on a woman for the space of two years, consequently he cannot associate with the rest of the tribe, except with the men when hunting, the women then being about their own business. When this time of probation past, he comes near the general camping-place, makes a good fire, and all his friends go to see him, felicitating him on the termination of his solitary mode of life, and if there be any female whom he has legal claims, she is at once surrendered." (Oldfield 1865, p. 252)) However, they lie to the west of the circumcision line, was denied by a colonial observer in 1886 who was familiar with their language, and has been contested by modern descendants and scholars, who state that this was a practice of the Watjarri to their west. (Note: "The fact that they did not circumcise also suggests that they would have interacted more closely with their northern and southern neighbours in ritual practice than they did with the Wajarri to the east, despite the indications that their relations with the Wajarri were better than for most coastal groups." (Dench 1998, p. 9)) Since the Inggarda social bands contiguous with the Watjarri were known under the distinct hordal name of Kurudandi (perhaps surviving in the contemporary station toponym Coordewandy), Tindale suggested that while the Inggarda to the east had not adopted this rite, the western clans might have at some time taken up the practice as current among the Watjarri.

The Nanda on the southern end of Shark Bay were much in fear of the Inggarda, who they regarded as highly proficient in the art of sorcery, which included the power to conjure up rain at will.

== Alternative names ==
- Angaardi, Angaardie
- Ingara, Ingarra, Ingarrah, Ingra
- Ingarda, Inggadi, Ingada, Ingadi
- Inparra (perhaps a misprint)
- Jaburu ("northerners")
- Kakarakala (a Mandi exonym referring also to the Baiyungu and Maia, from kalarra and karla (fire) the root of this word, kakarra means "east", a generic term)
- Kurudandi (eastern hordes)

== Some words ==
- mama (father)
- narana (white man)
- papa/kunta (water) (Note: The latter, transcribed in Gifford as koonda, was glossed by that source as bearing three distinct if related meanings: 'breasts, water, rain'. (Gifford 1886, p. 303))
- pipi (mother) (Note: Recorded as bibijura in Gifford where however the -jura is a suffix attached to kinship terms to denote possession. (Dench 1998, p. 29))
- thuthu (dog) (Note: Gifford supplied woora for a dog, tame or wild. (Gifford 1886, p. 304))

== Sources ==
- "AIATSIS map of Indigenous Australia". AIATSIS. 14 May 2024.
- Austin, Peter (1988). "Aboriginal languages of the Gascoyne-Ashburton region". La Trobe Working Papers in Linguistics 1:43–63. Vol. 1. La Trobe Working Papers in Linguistics. pp. 43–63.
- Barlee (1886). "Shark's Bay: The Majanna tribe". In Curr, Edward Micklethwaite (ed.). The Australian race: its origin, languages, customs, place of landing in Australia and the routes by which it spread itself over the continent (PDF). Vol. 1. Melbourne: J. Ferres. pp. 306–309.
- Dench, Alan (1998). Yingkarta. Lincom Europa. pp. 1–82.
- Gifford, Edric (1886). "From North-west Cape to Thirty Miles South of the Gascoyne River: The Kakarakala tribe". In Curr, Edward Micklethwaite (ed.). The Australian race: its origin, languages, customs, place of landing in Australia and the routes by which it spread itself over the continent (PDF). Vol. 1. Melbourne: J. Ferres. pp. 302–305.
- Oldfield, Augustus (1865). "On the aborigines of Australia". Transactions of the Ethnological Society. 3. London: 215-298.
- Radcliffe-Brown, A. R. (July 1930). "The Social Organization of Australian Tribes. Part II". Oceania. 1 (2): 206–246. doi:10.1002/j.1834-4461.1930.tb01645.x. JSTOR 40327321.
- "Tindale Tribal Boundaries" (PDF). Department of Aboriginal Affairs, Western Australia. September 2016. Archived from the original (PDF) on 8 March 2016.
- Tindale, Norman Barnett (1974). "Inggarda (WA)". Aboriginal Tribes of Australia: Their Terrain, Environmental Controls, Distribution, Limits, and Proper Names. Australian National University. ISBN 978-0-708-10741-6. Archived from the original on 20 March 2020.
