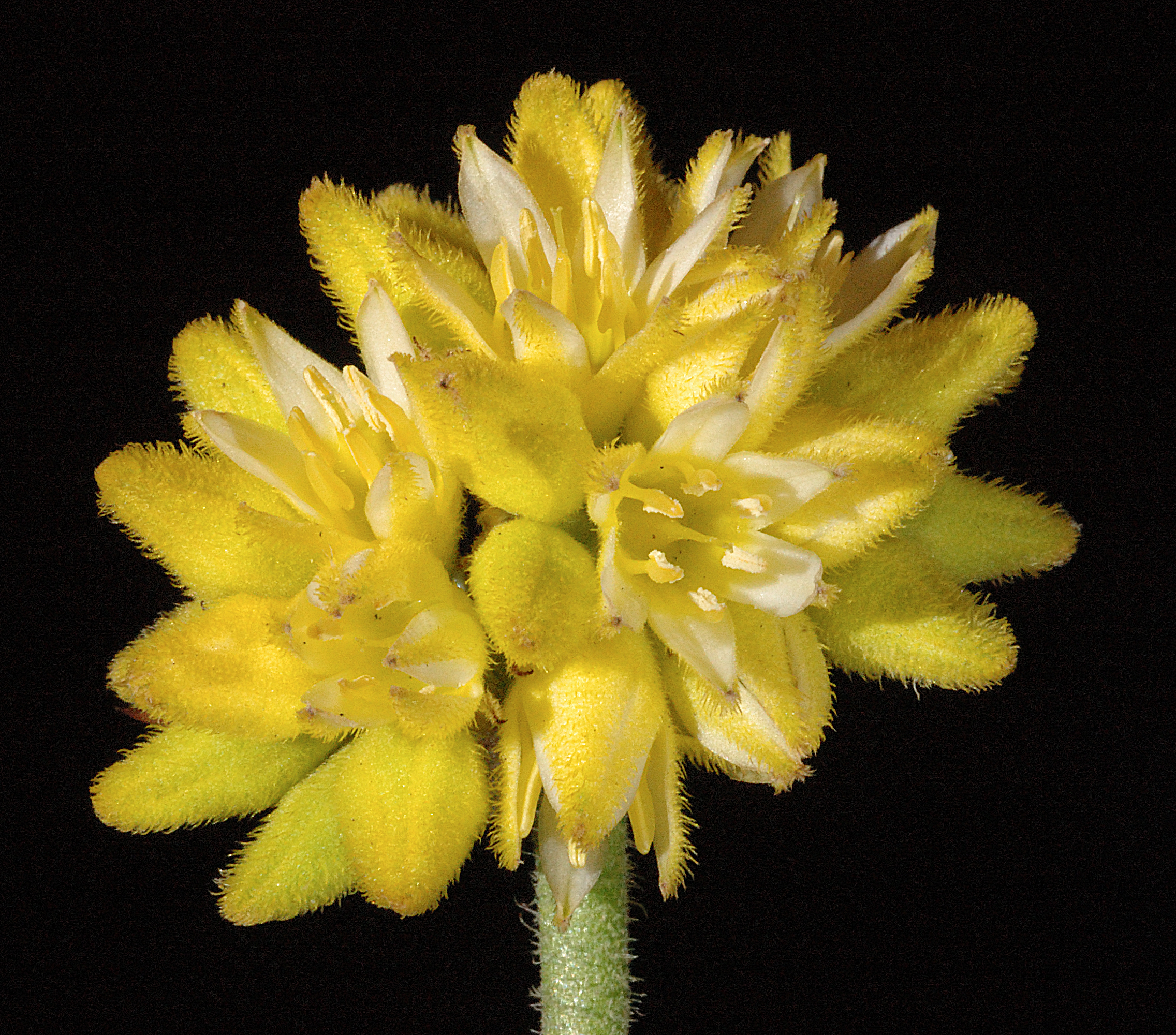

Scientific classification
- Kingdom: Plantae
- Clade: Tracheophytes
- Clade: Angiosperms
- Clade: Monocots
- Clade: Commelinids
- Order: Commelinales
- Family: Haemodoraceae
- Genus: Conostylis
- Species: C. aculeata

Binomial name
- Conostylis aculeata R.Br.
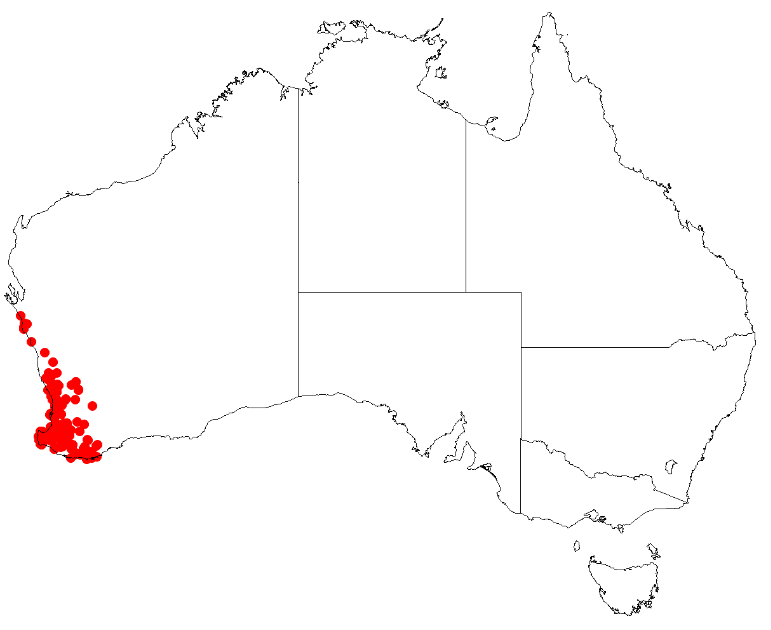
- Occurrence data from AVH

= Conostylis aculeata =

Species of flowering plant

Conostylis aculeata, commonly known as prickly conostylis, is a flowering, tufted perennial plant in the family Haemodoraceae. It has flat leaves and yellow, hairy, tubular flowers. It is endemic to the south-west of Western Australia.

== Description ==
Conostylis aculeata is a perennial tufted or multi-stemmed plant forming clumps 30 cm (12 in) wide and up to 60 cm (24 in) high. The leaves are flat, green, occasionally bluish-green, 60 cm (24 in) long, 1 cm (0.39 in) wide, margins usually with widely spaced spines. The flower stem is green, simple or multi-branched, 3–45 cm (1.2–17.7 in) long and similar length or longer than the leaves, bracts brown or green, flexible, smooth, dry and thin. The perianth is yellow on the inside and outside of the tube, hairy, 5–12 mm (0.20–0.47 in) long, lobes whitish inside, 3–9 mm (0.12–0.35 in) long, stamen upright, and borne in dense, terminal clusters. Flowering occurs from August to November.

== Taxonomy and naming ==
Conostylis aculeata was first formally described in 1810 by botanist Robert Brown and the description was published in Prodromus Florae Novae Hollandiae. The specific epithet (aculeata) is in reference to the prickly leaves.

== Distribution and habitat ==
This conostylis is a widespread species from the Zuytdorp National Park to Augusta and Albany and stretching inland to Cowcowing and Narembeen. It grows in various situations including sand, heath, loam and woodlands. Inland populations prefer wetter sites.

The following is a list of subspecies of C. aculeata accepted by the Australian Plant Census as of October 2023:

- C. aculeata R.Br. subsp. aculeata
- C. aculeata subsp. breviflora Hopper
- C. aculeata subsp. bromelioides (Endl.) J.W.Green
- C. aculeata subsp. cygnorum Hopper
- C. aculeata subsp. echinissima Hopper
- C. aculeata subsp. gracilis Hopper
- C. aculeata subsp. preissii (Endl.) J.W.Green
- C. aculeata subsp. rhipidion J.W.Green
- C. aculeata subsp. septentrionora Hopper
- C. aculeata subsp. spinuligera (Benth.) Hopper - spiny conostylis
