= Tedei =

Indigenous Western Australian people

The Tedei, otherwise known as the Thirrily, are an Aboriginal Australian people of Western Australia. They are a branch of the Yingkarta.

== Country ==
Tedei land consisted of some 3,100 square miles (8,000 km^{2}) extending from the east coast of Shark Bay through to the Wooramel River valley's headwaters as far as Pimbie, Carey Downs and the vicinity of Towrana. It included the coastal area north of Yaringa. inland to the headwaters, north only to Pimbie. Their limits were defined as a day's walk from either bank of the Wooramel.

== People ==
The Tedei were once classified as an autonomous tribe. The work of linguist Peter Austin points to the conclusion that they, the Tedei/Thirrily, were actually a dialect division of the Yingkarta, together with the Mandi tribe.

== Social organisation ==
The Tedei did not practice circumcision or Pazam.

== Alternative names ==
- Tjoki
- Choekie
- Chockie

== Sources ==
- "AIATSIS map of Indigenous Australia". AIATSIS. 14 May 2024.
- "Tindale Tribal Boundaries" (PDF). Department of Aboriginal Affairs, Western Australia. September 2016. Archived from the original (PDF) on 8 March 2016.
- Austin, Peter (1988). Aboriginal languages of the Gascoyne-Ashburton region. Vol. 1. La Trobe Working Papers in Linguistics. pp. 43–63.
- Oldfield, Augustus (1865). "On the aborigines of Australia". Transactions of the Ethnological Society. 3. London: 215–298. doi:10.2307/3014165. JSTOR 3014165.
- Tindale, Norman Barnett (1974). "Tedei (WA)". Aboriginal Tribes of Australia: Their Terrain, Environmental Controls, Distribution, Limits, and Proper Names. Australian National University. ISBN 978-0-708-10741-6. Archived from the original on 20 March 2020.
