= Edel Land National Park =

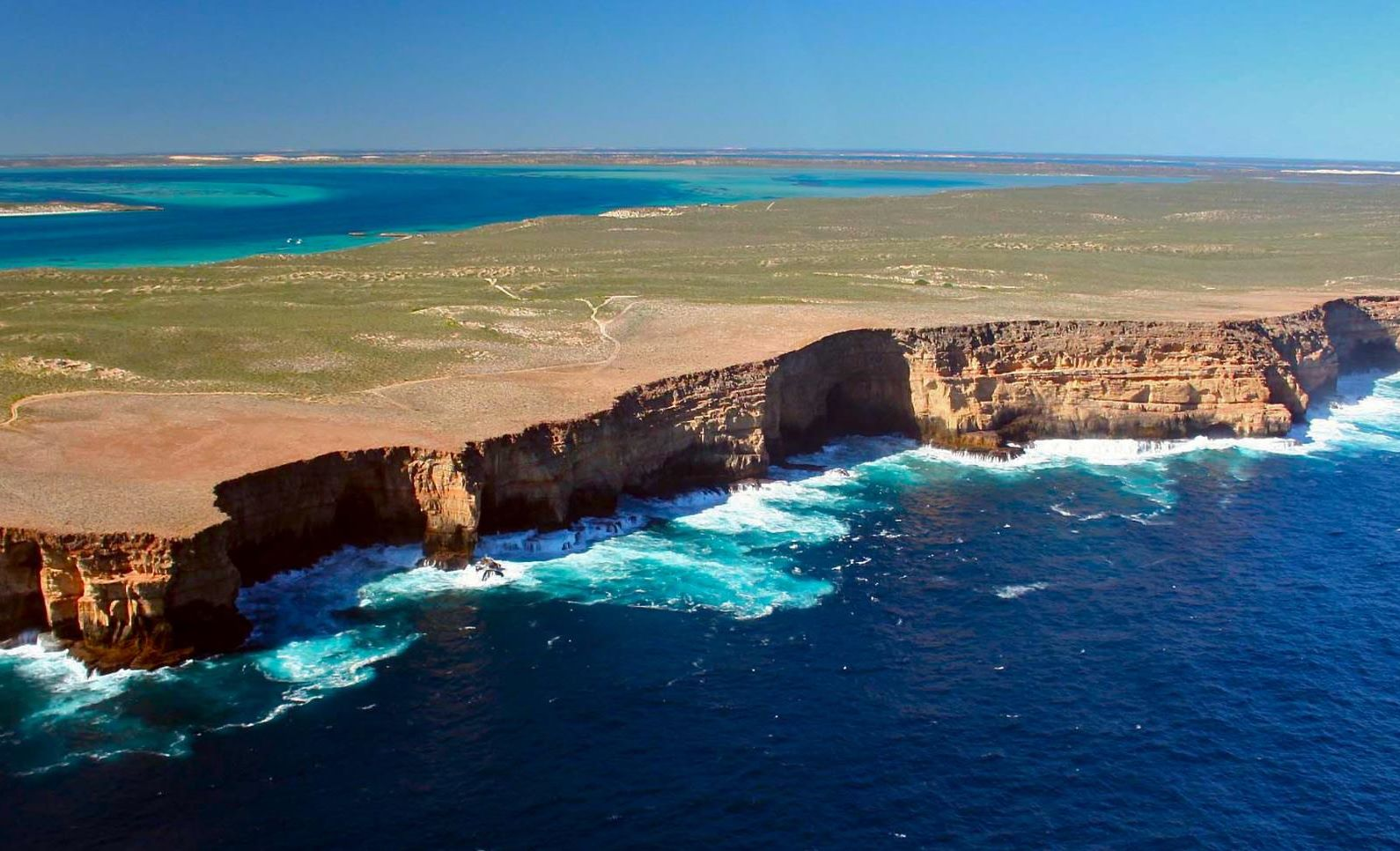
- The Zuytdorp Cliffs that border Edel Land

- Location within Western Australia
- Location: Western Australia
- Nearest city: Denham
- Coordinates: 26°09′05″S 113°09′18″E
- Governing body: Department of Biodiversity, Conservation and Attractions
- Website: https://parks.dpaw.wa.gov.au/park/edel-land

Edel Land National Park is a proposed national park located in the Gascoyne Region of Western Australia, located 670 kilometres (420 mi) north of the state's capital Perth.

The national park is also a part of the Shark Bay World Heritage Site and lies south of Steep Point, which was named in 1697 by Willem de Vlamingh calling it Steyle Hock when he was anchored adjacent to the cliffs at the southern side of Dirk Hartog Island.

== History ==
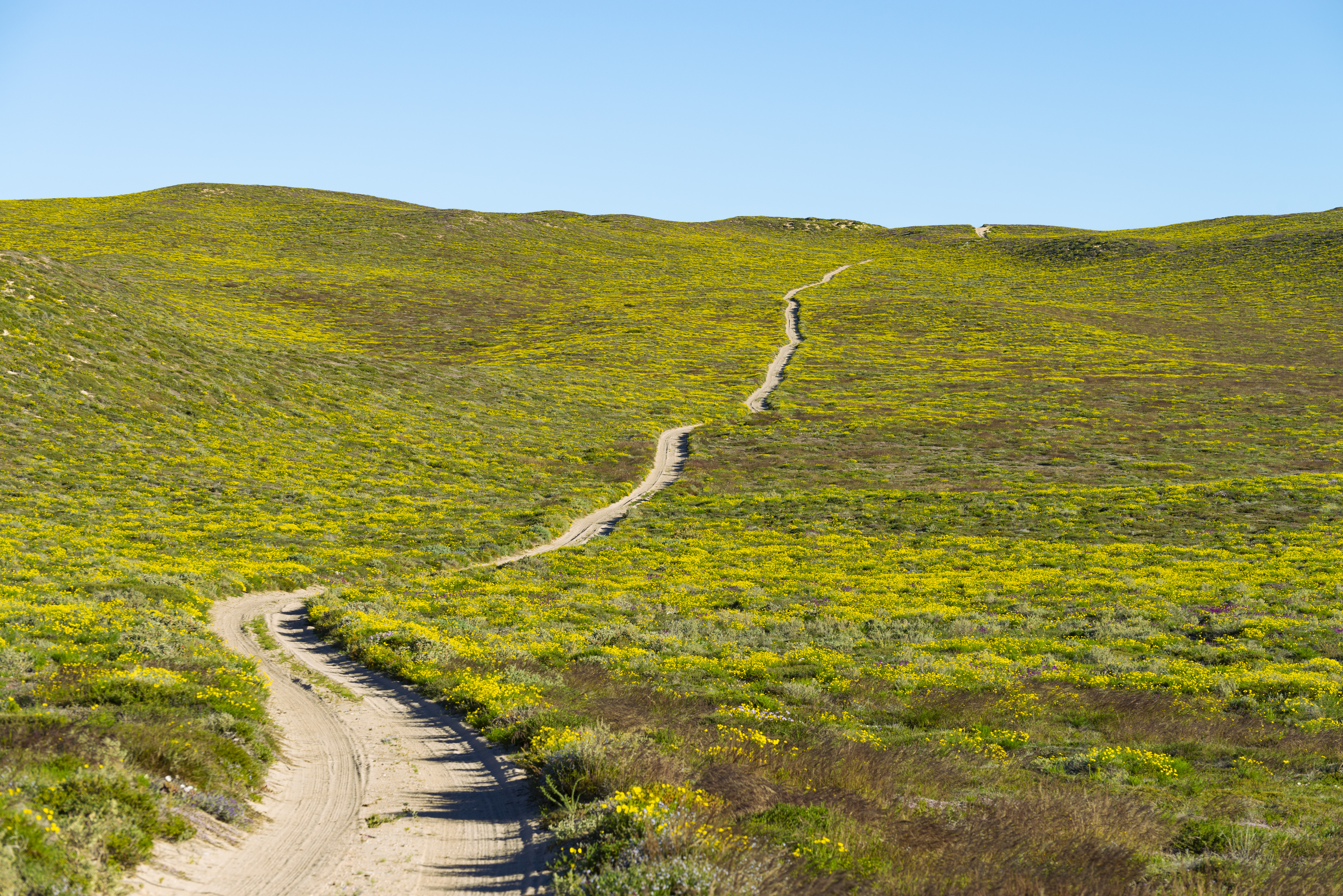
Wildflowers at the park

The park is located on the traditional country of the Malgana people. Edel Land was an important place for Indigenous Australians. Tools were created using stone from a natural quarry at Crayfish Bay. Food was available in the form of fish, as well as the flora located in the park. Fresh water was sourced from Willyah Mia, on the eastern shore of the peninsula.

The earliest European exploration of the region was by the Dutch explorer Dirk Hartog in 1616. Hartog landed on the nearby island, now named Dirk Hartog Island. Hartog was the first European to land on the western coastline of Australia.
