= Skipper's ticket =

Western Australian certificate

A recreational skipper's ticket (RST) is the Western Australian equivalent of a boat driver's licence; however, it is considered a certificate of competency rather than a licence. It has been required to be held by the skipper of all recreational boats with an engine greater than 4.5 kW (6HP) since April 2008.

== Age restrictions ==
You must be at least 14 years old to get an RST.

RST holder under 16 years old are restricted to operating a vessel:

- during daylight hours, and
- at a speed less than 8 knots.
