= Yalgoo bioregion =

Bioregion in Western Australia

Yalgoo
- Region
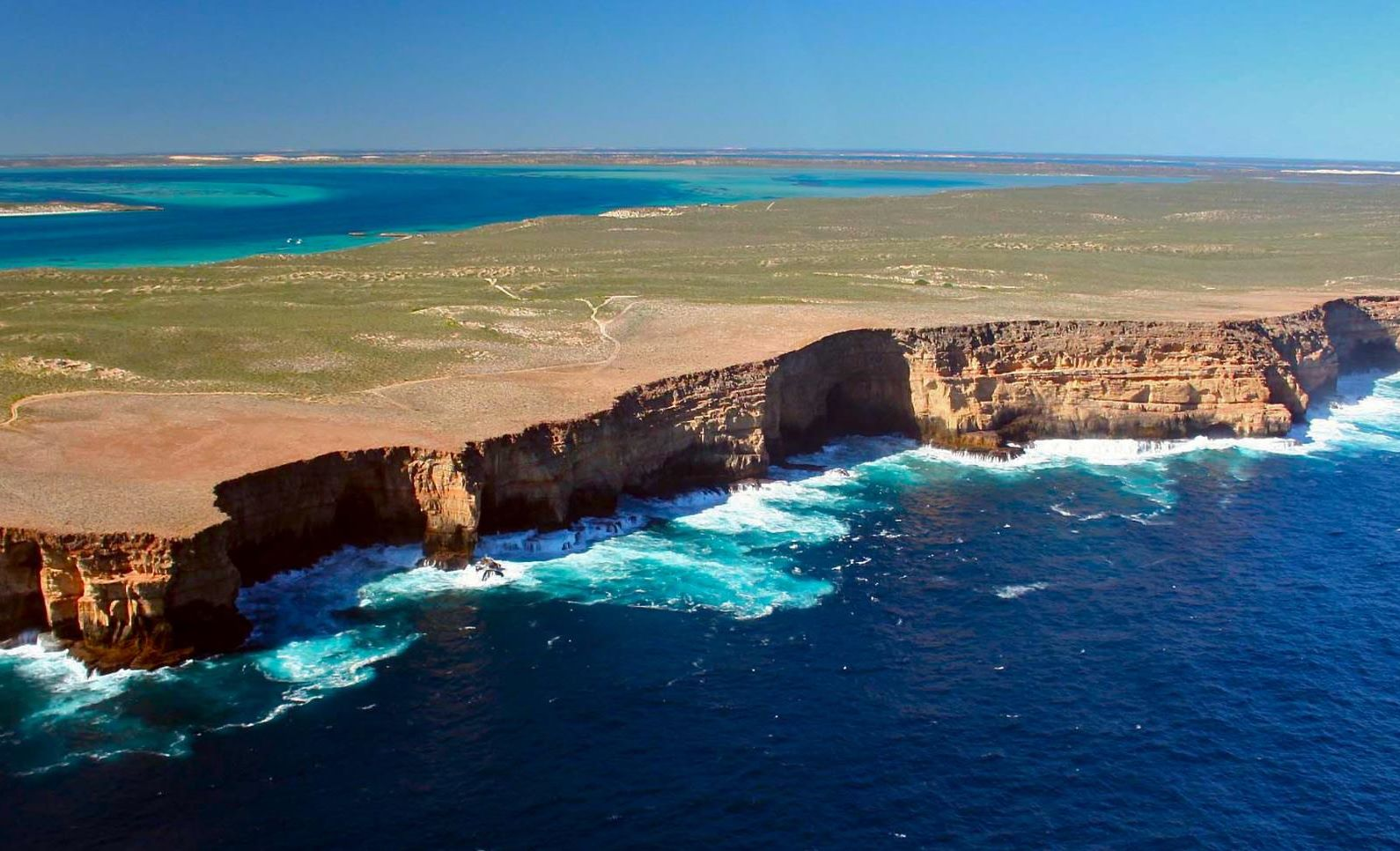
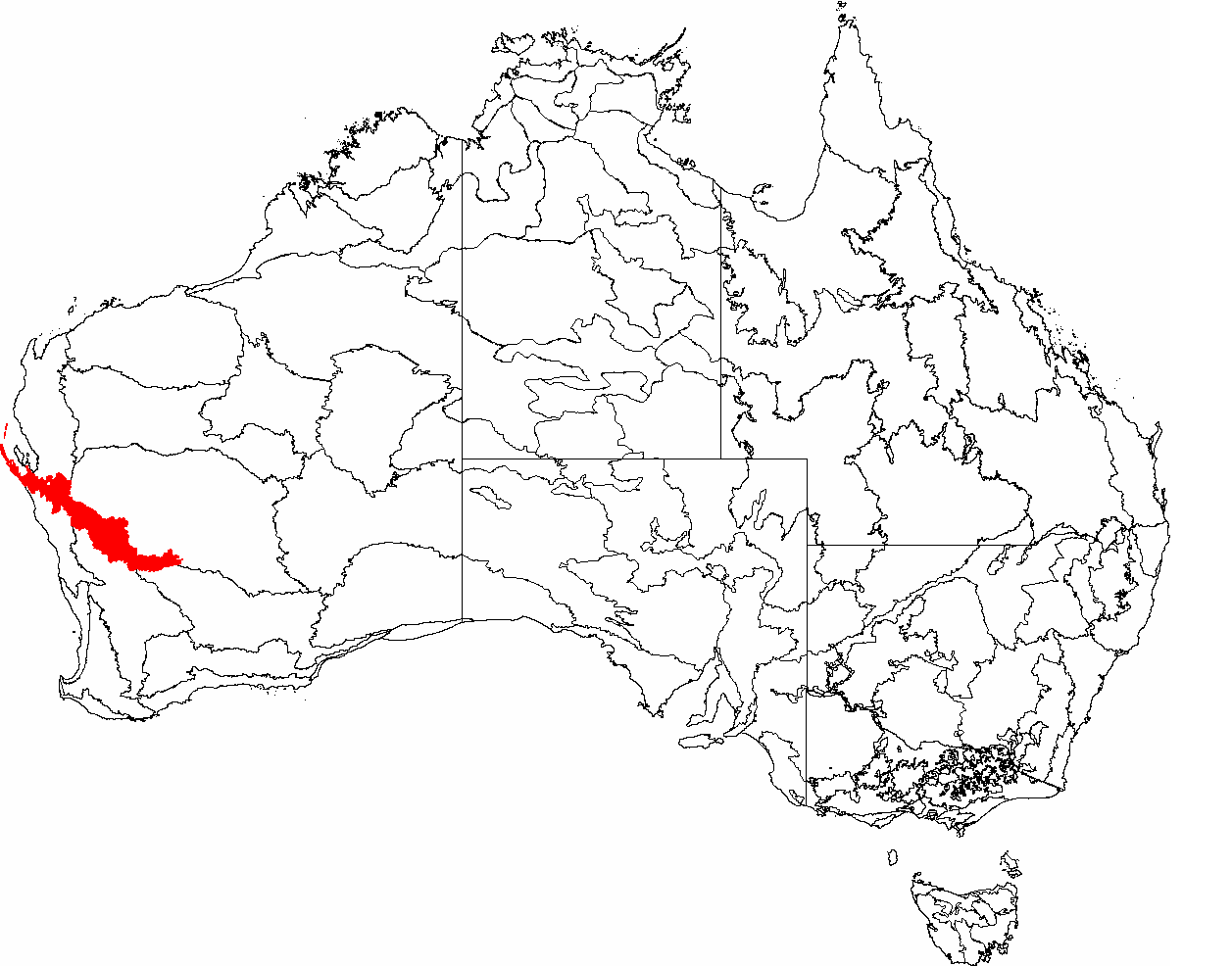
- Zuytdorp Cliffs and Edel Land The interim Australian bioregions, with Yalgoo in red
- Country: Australia
- State: Western Australia

Area
  - Total: 50,875.77 km^{2} (19,643.24 sq mi)
Localities around Yalgoo
Shark Bay	Carnarvon	Murchison
Indian Ocean	Yalgoo	Murchison
Geraldton Sandplains	Avon Wheatbelt	Coolgardie

Yalgoo is an interim Australian bioregion located in Western Australia. It has an area of 5,087,577 hectares (12,571,680 acres). The bioregion, together with the Avon Wheatbelt and Geraldton Sandplains bioregions, is part of the larger Southwest Australia savanna ecoregion as classified by the World Wildlife Fund.

== Geography ==
The Yalgoo bioregion extends southeastwards from the southern end of Shark Bay on Australia's west coast nearly to Lake Barlee in the interior of Western Australia.

The western portion, known as the Edel subregion, includes the Edel Land peninsula and Dirk Hartog, Bernier, and Dorre islands, which enclose Shark Bay on the west. It also includes the coastal plain south of Shark Bay nearly to Kalbarri, where it transitions to the Geraldton Sandplains bioregion. The Edel subregion rests on the Carnarvon and Perth sedimentary basins. The Zuytdorp Cliffs line the coast from the northern end of Edel Land to the mouth of the Murchison River. Soils are generally white sands along the coast, and pale red quaternary sands further inland.

The Tallering subregion includes the Toolonga Plateau, part of the Carnarvon basin, and extends southeastward across the Yilgarn craton, an uplifted block of ancient crystalline rock.

=== Subregions ===
In the Interim Biogeographic Regionalisation for Australia (IBRA) system it has the code of YAL, and it has two sub-regions.

IBRA regions and subregions: IBRA7
IBRA region / subregion	IBRA code	Area	States	Location in Australia
Yalgoo	YAL	5,087,577 hectares (12,571,680 acres)	WA	
Edel	YAL01	1,588,634 hectares (3,925,600 acres)	WA	
Tallering	YAL02	3,498,943 hectares (8,646,080 acres)	WA	

Earlier versions of the IBRA included the Edel subregion in the Geraldton Sandplains bioregion. 2004's version 6.1 of the IBRA added the Edel subregion to the Yalgoo bioregion, and re-designated the original Yalgoo bioregion as the Tallering subregion.

== Climate ==
The bioregion has a semi-arid Mediterranean climate, with hot, dry summers and mild winters. Most rainfall is in the winter months. Yalgoo bioregion is in the transitional region, or interzone, between the Mediterranean climate Southwest Australia and the deserts of central Australia.

== Flora and fauna ==
Common plant communities in the Edel subregion include tree-heaths dominated by members of the Proteaceae plant family, and Acacia–Casuarina thickets. The vegetation of the Tallering subregion is characterised by woodlands, dominated by species of Eucalyptus, Acacia, and Callitris. Plant communities include Callitris–Eucalyptus salubris woodlands, mulga (Acacia aneura) woodlands, and bowgada (Acacia ramulosa) open woodlands and scrub. The Tallering subregion is particularly rich in herbaceous ephemeral plants.

Native mammals include the boodie (Bettongia lesueur), rufous hare-wallaby (Lagorchestes hirsutus), banded hare-wallaby (Lagostrophus fasciatus), western barred bandicoot (Perameles bougainville), and Shark Bay mouse (Pseudomys fieldi). These mammals' current range is mostly limited to the Edel subregion, although some formerly had a wider range.

Native birds include the malleefowl (Leipoa ocellata) and western grasswren (Amytornis textilis). A subspecies of purple-backed fairywren, Malurus assimilis bernieri, is found only on Bernier and Dorre islands, and the black and white fairy wren (Malurus leucopterus leucopterus), a subspecies of white-winged fairywren, is found only on Dirk Hartog Island.

The sandhill frog (Arenophryne rotunda) is a limited-range species found in the Edel subregion and the northern Geraldton Sandplains bioregion.

== Land use ==
The predominant land use is livestock pasturing on natural vegetation.

== Protected areas ==
12.53% of the Yalgoo bioregion is in protected areas.

Much of the Edel subregion is within the Shark Bay World Heritage area. 32.28% of the subregion is protected, and protected areas include Shark Bay Marine Park, Dirk Hartog Island National Park, Zuytdorp Nature Reserve, and Toolonga Nature Reserve.

Only 3.56 of the Tallering subregion is in protected areas.
