= Wooramel Station =

Pastoral lease in Western Australia

Coordinates: 25.737°S 114.285°E

Location in Western Australia

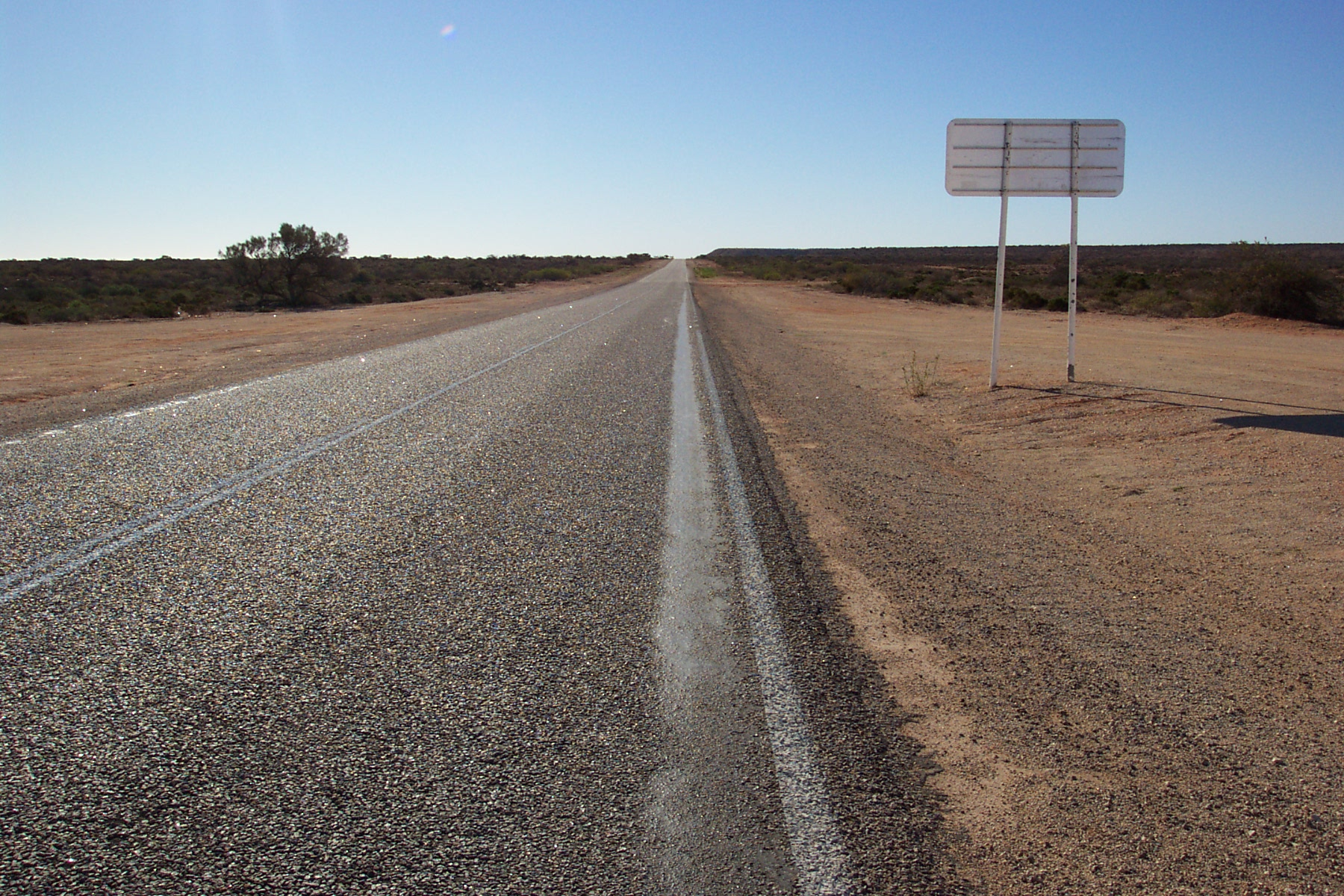
North West Coastal Highway near Wooramel

Wooramel Station is a pastoral lease and sheep station located 78 kilometres (48 mi) east of Denham and 113 kilometres (70 mi) south east of Carnarvon in the Gascoyne region of Western Australia.

The property occupies an area of 1,430 square kilometres (552 sq mi) and is situated along the North West Coastal Highway, with 60 kilometres (37 mi) frontage to the road providing 10-month-a-year access to most parts of the station. Wooramel also has 60 kilometres (37 mi) of coastline frontage to the Indian Ocean and backs onto the Shark Bay world heritage area.

The Wooramel River cuts through the property providing well grassed flood plains; the coastal plain also provides good grazing land. Saltbush and bluebush pastures make up about 40% of the property with wanyu and Acacia bushland making up the remaining 40%.

The station was established in the early 1880s when artesian water was drilled so large volumes were available to water stock. The position of shepherd for the station was advertised in 1882, and the owner of Wooramel in 1883 was John Winthrop Hackett. The unstocked station was put on the market in 1885, at which time it occupied an area of 200,000 acres (80,937 ha).

The property had a flock of approximately 21,000 sheep including 5,000 lambs in 1910. During shearing of the same year 325 bales of wool were produced.

In 1923 Ernest A. Hall sold Sherlock Station to Edward Meares and acquired Wooramel Station from Dalgety and Co. Hall immediately set to drilling bores to find permanent water sources for the flock. Three bores were sunk during 1924 to a depth of 1,222 feet (372 m) and were producing flows of millions of gallons per day.

The station suffered from extensive damage from flooding following the passing of the remnants over a cyclone over the area in 1945.

Father O'Sullivan, the flying padre, was forced to land his Tiger Moth airplane on a claypan at Wooramel in 1956 after experiencing engine trouble and poor visibility. He was sighted later by the pilot of a MacRobertson Miller DC3 that had been diverted to search. O'Sullivan was later rescued by a search party that had to cut a road from Wooramel to the site.

The area was struck by years of drought until large scale flooding occurred in late 2010 following heavy rains from a tropical low. 227 millimetres (9 in) of rain fell in 24 hours and once the waters ebbed away locusts became a problem.

== See also ==
- List of pastoral leases in Western Australia
