= Mandi people =

Western Australian Indigenous People

The Mandi, otherwise known as Manthi, were an Aboriginal Australian people of Western Australia.

== Country ==
Mandi tribal territory encompassed approximately 1,000 square miles (2,600 km^{2}). Its northern frontier was just below Boolathanna, and from Carnarvon extended westwards as far as Doorawarrah. It took in the lower Gascoyne River area and its swampy tributaries, with the southern boundary around Grey Point.

== People ==
Norman Tindale defined the Mandi as a distinct tribe. Later work by the area language expert Peter Austin concluded that Tindale's distinction between the Mandi and the Tedei, both of which he regarded as independent tribes, should be reformulated, with the Mandi and Tedei actually representing two branches of the Yingkarta.

== Alternative names ==
- Maandi
- Nandu

== Sources ==
- "AIATSIS map of Indigenous Australia". AIATSIS. 14 May 2024.
- "Tindale Tribal Boundaries" (PDF). Department of Aboriginal Affairs, Western Australia. September 2016. Archived from the original (PDF) on 8 March 2016.
- Austin, Peter (1988). "Aboriginal languages of the Gascoyne-Ashburton region". La Trobe Working Papers in Linguistics 1:43–63. Vol. 1. La Trobe Working Papers in Linguistics. pp. 43–63.
- Tindale, Norman Barnett (1974). "Mandi (WA)". Aboriginal Tribes of Australia: Their Terrain, Environmental Controls, Distribution, Limits, and Proper Names. Australian National University. ISBN 978-0-708-10741-6. Archived from the original on 20 March 2020.
