= Yinikutira =

Indigenous people of Western Australia

Yinikutira, also recorded as the Jinigudira, are the traditional Aboriginal owners of the land along the Ningaloo Coast in the area of the Exmouth Peninsula in Western Australia now known as the Cape Range National Park. The area is within the Gascoyne region.

== Language ==
The Yinikurtira spoke a dialect of Thalanyji.

== Country ==
The Yinikurtira's traditional lands enclosed about 2,000 square miles (5,200 km^{2}) around the North West Cape peninsula area down to Exmouth Gulf and the Whaleback Hills, and from the cape southwest to Point Cloates.

== People ==
Norman Tindale classified the Yinikutira as a distinct tribe, on the basis of his informants who insisted that traditionally they had been distinct and separate from the eastern Thalanyji. Peter Austin sees them as a dialect subdivision of the Thalanyji-speaking people. While they were observed by early explorers deploying rafts to venture out into the sea for hunting, their primary source of food came from a network of fish traps which they maintained in tidal estuaries.

== History ==
The area was described by William Dampier, in 1699, and American whalers are known to have hunted sperm and then humpback whales off the Ningaloo coast as early as the 1790s, and it is thought probably they landed to seek meat and refresh their water supplies. Yinikutira people gave assistance and then hospitality to two Dalmatian Italians from the Austro-Hungarian Stefano after Stefano was wrecked on the Ningaloo Reef in 1875. The two, Michele Bacich (17) and Giovanni Iurich (20), later, on repatriation to Ragusa, provided an account of their experiences in a manuscript (Naufraghi dello Stefano) written up by a Jesuit priest, Stefano Scurla, which also contains a word-list of the language they learnt, a Ngarluma creole, during their three month sojourn with the Yinikutira. The Yinikutira's staple diet was based on fish, turtle and dugong. They lived in the mangroves and would venture out to sea on logs. In that same year, 1876, the first pastoral lease was taken up in the area when Minilya Station was established over the Exmouth Peninsula in its entirely. After subdivisions, Thomas Carter established the Yardie Creek Station over 54,600 hectares.

At some point in this time, the Yinikutira disappeared from history. It has been speculated that, after the Colonial Secretary's Office forbade the use of convict labour above the 26th parallel, the local workforce among pearlers and pastoralists began to recruit indigenous tribes. The provisions of the subsequent Master and Servant Act (1867) meant that in this area, as applied, natives who absconded from contracted service ended up doing hard labour in Roebourne prison. The available evidence suggests that the local tribes such as the Yinikutira were decimated by the practice of blackbirding and introduced diseases.

No indigenous people of the present day claim descent from the Yunikutira. The Yardie Creek Station was eventually re-acquired in 1959 by the Western Australian Government to become part of the Cape Range National Park.

== Burial customs ==
The Yinikutira practised a distinctive form of burial not shared by other Thalanyji-speaking peoples.

== Alternative names ==
- Inikurdira, Jinigudera, Jinigura, Jiniguri
- Jarungura

== Sources ==
- "AIATSIS map of Indigenous Australia". AIATSIS. 14 May 2024.
- "Tindale Tribal Boundaries" (PDF). Department of Aboriginal Affairs, Western Australia. September 2016. Archived from the original (PDF) on 8 March 2016.
- Austin, Peter (1988). Aboriginal languages of the Gascoyne-Ashburton region. Vol. 1. La Trobe Working Papers in Linguistics 1:43–63. pp. 43–63.
- Meakins, Felicity (2014). "Language contact varieties". In Koch, Harold; Nordlinger, Rachel (eds.). The Languages and Linguistics of Australia: A Comprehensive Guide. Walter de Gruyter. pp. 365–415. ISBN 978-3-110-27977-1.
- Ningaloo Coast National Heritage Place (PDF). Australian Government. 13 October 2005.
- Przywolnik, Kathryn (2003). "Shell artefacts from northern Cape Range Peninsula, northwest Western Australia". Australian Archaeology. 56 (56): 12–21. doi:10.1080/03122417.2003.11681745. S2CID 143121118.
- Tindale, Norman Barnett (1974). "Jinigudira (WA)". Aboriginal Tribes of Australia: Their Terrain, Environmental Controls, Distribution, Limits, and Proper Names. Australian National University. ISBN 978-0-708-10741-6. Archived from the original on 20 March 2020.
