= Maia people =

Indigenous tribe of Western Australia

The Maia were an indigenous Australian tribe of Western Australia.

== Language ==
The Maia appear to have spoken a dialect similar to that of the Yingkarta.

== Country ==
Maia traditional lands extended over an estimated 4,700 square miles (12,000 km^{2}). They consisted mainly of a strip on the coast facing the Indian Ocean, and a western hinterland and up to and beyond Boolathanna, Mooka, Mardathuna, Binthalya, and the Kennedy Range. They also lived around the coastal salt lakes near Carnarvon to Manberry and Hutton Creek. Their southern flank ran down to the floodplain of the Gascoyne River, and on Lake Macleod.

== History of contact ==
The Maia are believed to have been extinct by 1910. Their area was afflicted by diseases like smallpox and influenza which ravaged the coastal populations after the establishment of pearling stations on the coast, at Shark Bay and Cossack. Subsequently, "nigger hunting" to cull hands to work the pearling trawlers, and a system of indentured labour imposed on the tribes found by pastoralists on their runs, effectively decimated people like the Maia by breaking up their kinship groups.

== Alternative names ==
- Majanna (nggarda exonym)
- Miah

Source: Tindale 1974, p. 246

== Some words ==
- baba (1.breasts; 2.rain; 3.water)
- doodoota (wild dog)
- mamma (father)
- manghana (tame dog)
- marawa (white man)
- ngangerreta (mother)
- yamba (baby)

Source: Barlee 1886, pp. 307–308

== Sources ==
- "AIATSIS map of Indigenous Australia". AIATSIS. 14 May 2024.
- Austin, Peter (1988). Aboriginal languages of the Gascoyne-Ashburton region. Vol. 1. La Trobe Working Papers in Linguistics. pp. 43–63.
- Barlee, Frederick (1886). "The Majanna Tribe". In Curr, Edward Micklethwaite (ed.). The Australian race: its origin, languages, customs, place of landing in Australia and the routes by which it spread itself over the continent (PDF). Vol. 1. Melbourne: J. Ferres. pp. 307–309.
- "Tindale Tribal Boundaries" (PDF). Department of Aboriginal Affairs, Western Australia. September 2016. Archived from the original (PDF) on 8 March 2016.
- Tindale, Norman Barnett (1974). "Maia (WA)". Aboriginal Tribes of Australia: Their Terrain, Environmental Controls, Distribution, Limits, and Proper Names. Australian National University. ISBN 978-0-708-10741-6. Archived from the original on 20 March 2020.
