= Wooramel River =

River in Western Australia

Wooramel
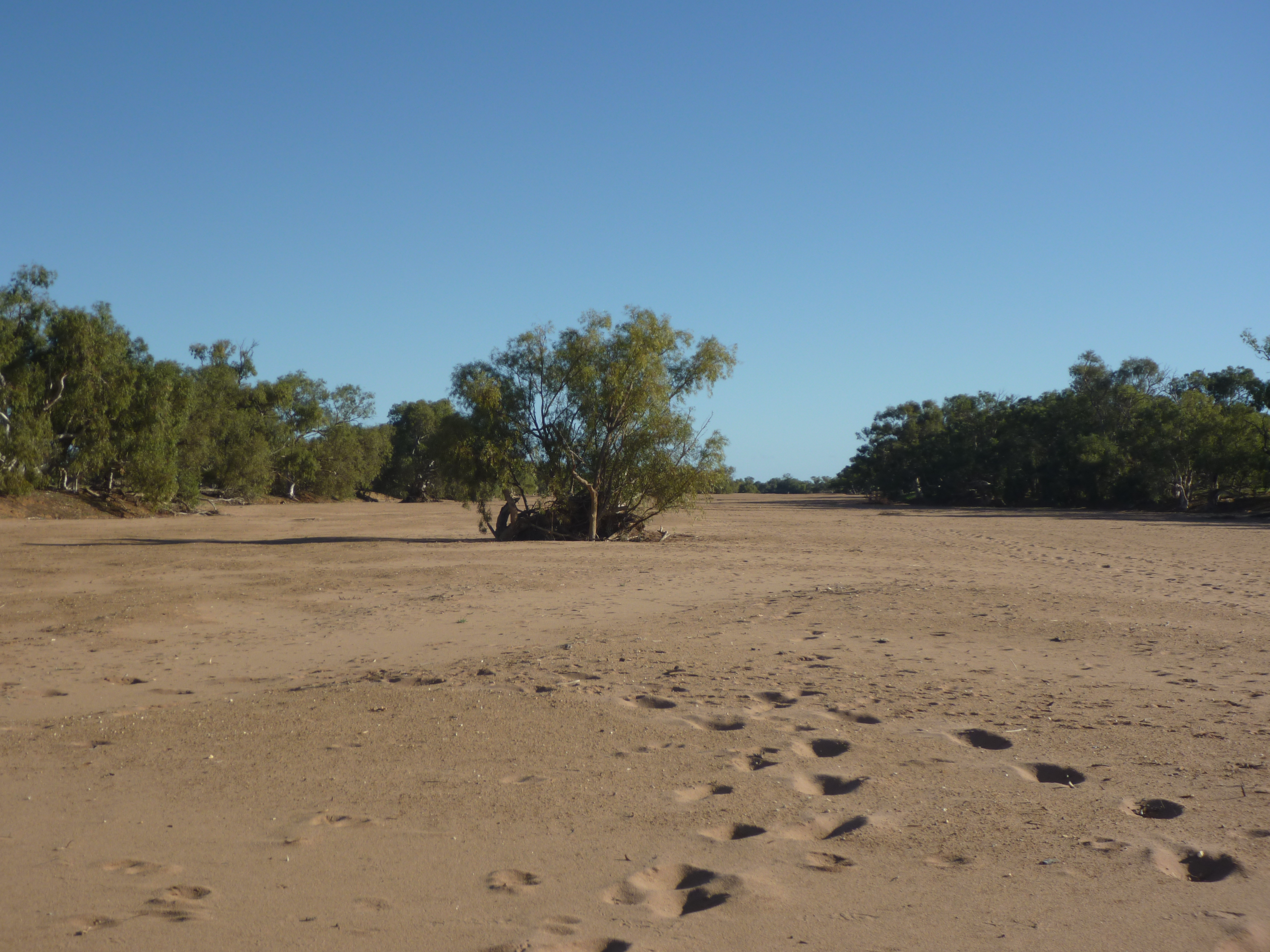
- The dry riverbed in 2020, near the Wooramel caravan park.

Location
- Country: Australia
- State: Western Australia
- Region: Gascoyne

Physical characteristics
- Source: McLeod Pyramid
  - coordinates: 25°47′12″S 116°40′23″E
  - elevation: 357 m (1,171 ft)
- Mouth: Shark Bay
  - location: near Herald Loop
  - coordinates: 25°52′59″S 114°13′57″E
  - elevation: 0 m (0 ft)
- Length: 363 km (226 mi)
- Basin size: 40,500 km^{2} (15,600 sq mi)
- Discharge
  - location: mouth

The Wooramel River is an ephemeral river in the Gascoyne region of Western Australia.

The river rises near McLeod Pyramid and flows in a westerly direction, joined by six tributaries including the Wooramel River North, Bilung Creek, One Gum Creek and Nyarra Creek. The river is crossed by the Carnarvon-Mullewa Road near Pandara, then runs through the Carandibby Range. It runs through Wooramel Station before it is crossed by the North West Coastal Highway near the Wooramel Roadhouse, and discharges into Shark Bay and the Indian Ocean near Herald Loop. The catchment area has been approximately 40% cleared. The river descends 357 metres (1,171 ft) over its 363 kilometres (226 mi) course.

The river has a non-pristine estuary that has been mostly unmodified.

The estuary contains the seagrass Ruppia megacarpa and is naturally open to the ocean for two to six weeks per year, usually following a wet winter or a cyclonic event.

== See also ==
- List of watercourses in Western Australia
- Wooramel Station
- Wooramel Seagrass Bank
