= Steep Point =

Headland in Western Australia

- Point
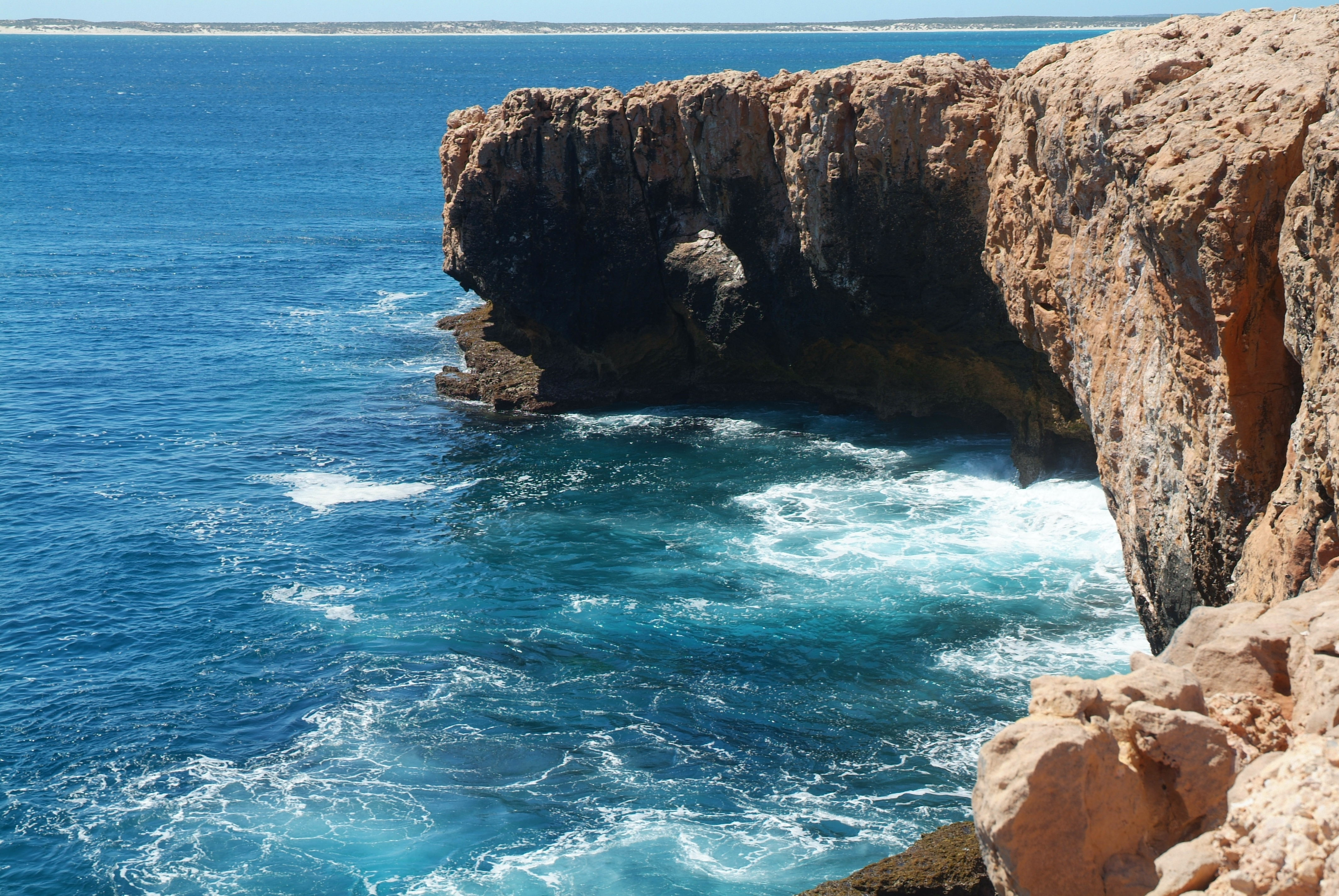
- Steep Point from the south

- Location in Western Australia
- Steep Point is the westernmost point of mainland Australia.
- Coordinates: 26.152283°S 113.156064°E
- Location: Shire of Shark Bay
- Part of: Shark Bay World Heritage Site
- Offshore water bodies: Indian Ocean

Area
  - Total: 1.1 ha (2.7 acres)

Dimensions
  - Length: 308 m (1,010 ft)
  - Width: 258 m (846 ft)
  - Depth: 79 m (259 ft)

Steep Point is the westernmost point of mainland Australia. It is located within the Gascoyne region of Western Australia, 670 kilometres (420 mi) north of the state's capital Perth, in the proposed Edel Land National Park. It is also a part of the Shark Bay World Heritage Site. The point was named Steyle Hock by Willem de Vlamingh in 1697.

== Access ==
Access to Steep Point is by four-wheel drive vehicles only, as tracks to the point are through sand dunes. The North West Coastal Highway is the closest sealed road and is 200 kilometres (120 mi) east of the point. An entry permit is required to travel to the point, which can be purchased at the ranger's house in Edel Land National Park, which is about 20 kilometres (12 mi) east of Steep Point. Camping areas and basic facilities are also available in the park and can be purchased at the ranger's house.

The nearest town to Steep Point is Denham, also located within the Shark Bay World Heritage Site, which is 232 kilometres (144 mi) from the point by four-wheel drive track and road, however only 44 kilometres (27 mi) north-east of the point as the crow flies.

Surf Point on Dirk Hartog Island is 4.2 kilometres (2.6 mi) north-northeast of Steep Point. Access to the island is possible via a ferry from Blackie's Beach east of Shelter Bay across South Passage to Cape Ransonnet, the closest point on Dirk Hartog Island to Blackie's Beach. Blackie's Beach is 6 kilometres (3.7 mi) east-southeast from Steep Point.

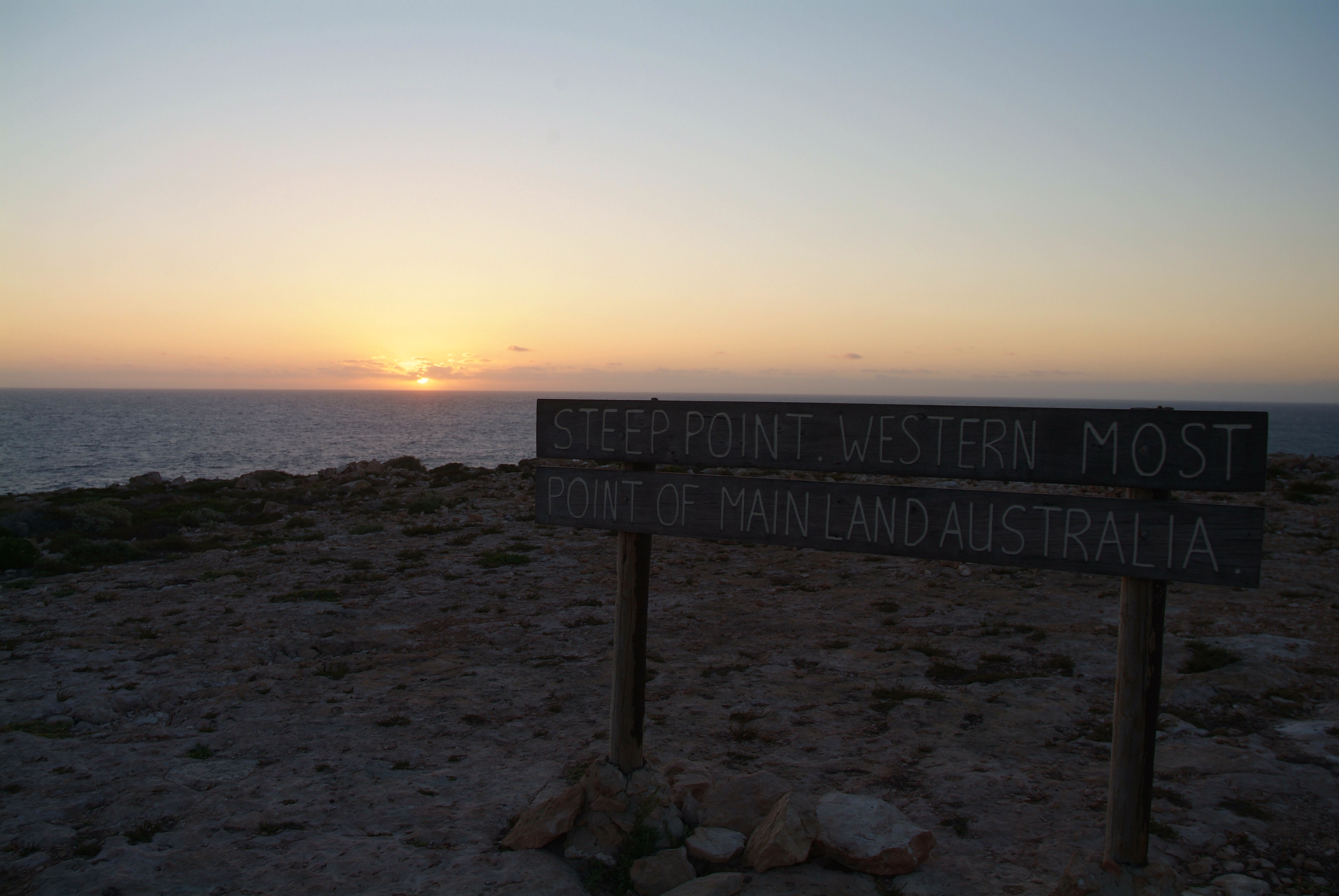
The "final sunset" in Australia, at Steep Point

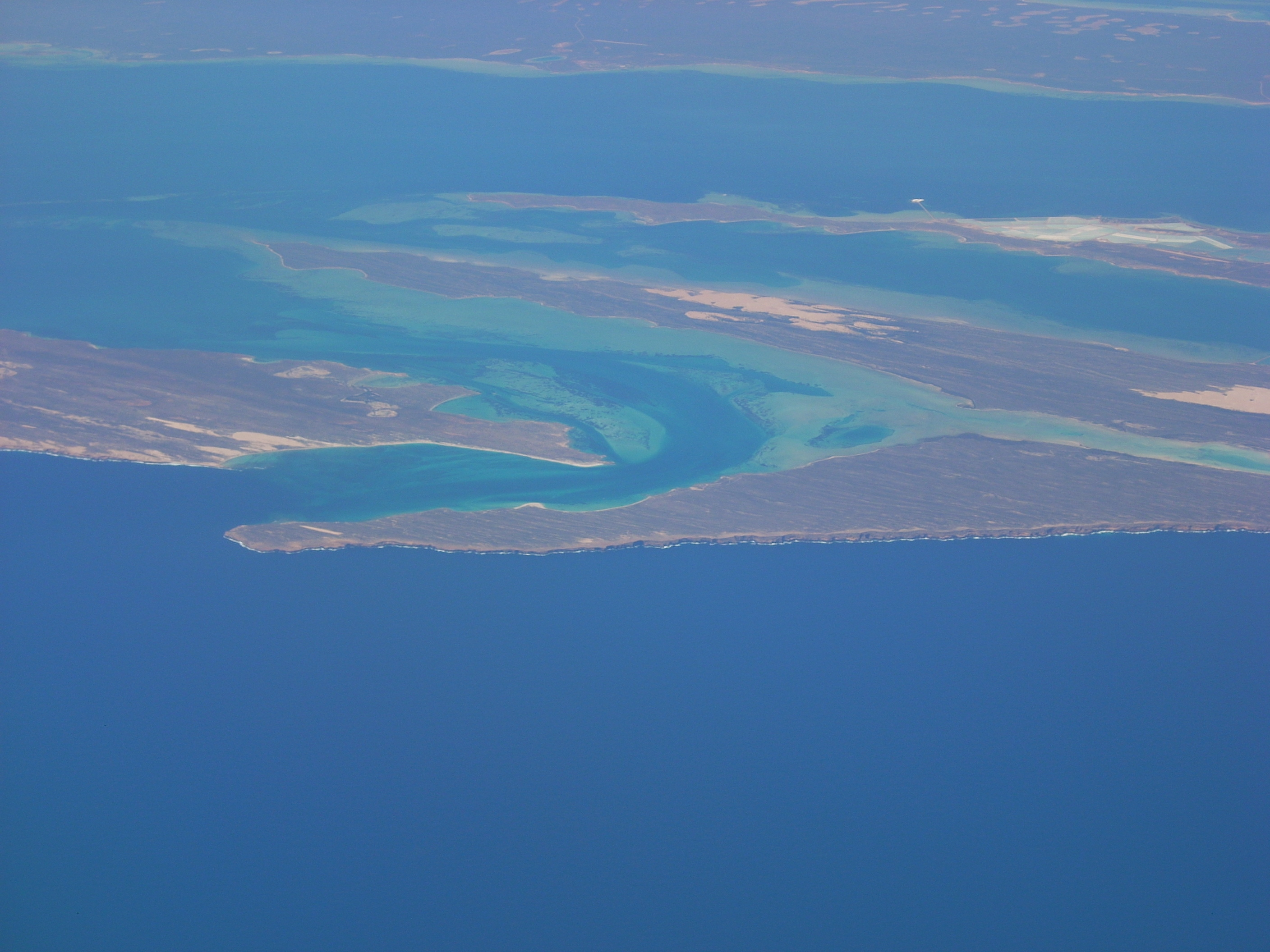
An aerial view of Steep Point and Dirk Hartog Island

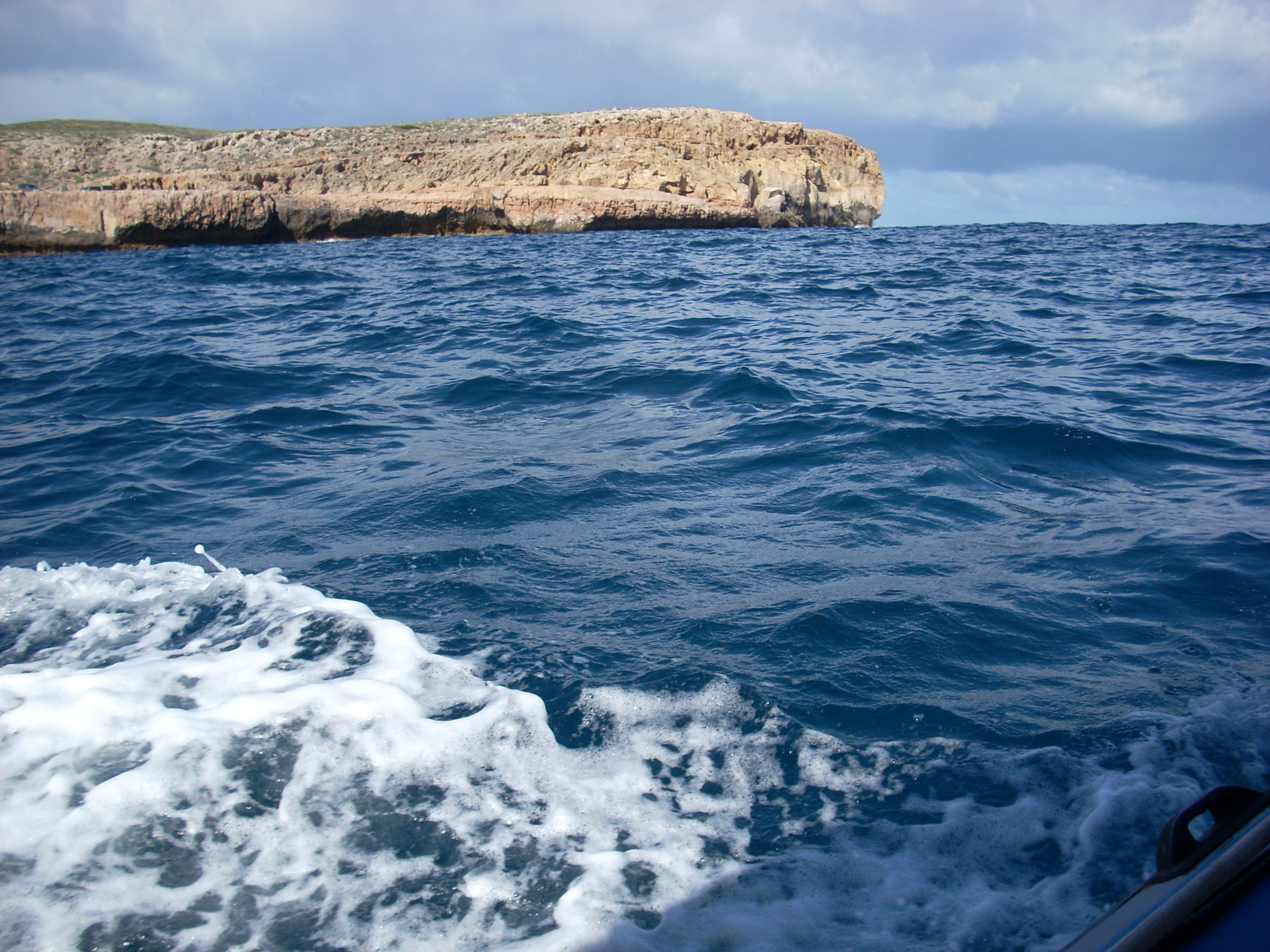
Steep Point, as seen from the north

Steep Point is one of Australia's most renowned land-based game fishing places, with over 320 different species of fish that have been caught off the point, where mackerel, sailfish and trevally are the most common. Serious fishers harness themselves onto the point, float their baits off the cliff using helium balloons and haul their catch up uses specially designed fishing gaffs, however it is very common that a shark steals the fisher's catch before they can haul it up onto land.

Steep Point is commonly known for the "final sunset" in Australia.

Steep Point is a reference point for other places and points of interests. For example, the location of the shipwreck HMAS Sydney is cited from the point. In 1994 a pamphlet of the title was produced about the wrecks along the coast.

On 17 July 2006 the largest ever recorded tsunami to hit Australia was measured at 7.9 metres (26 ft) high at Steep Point. It was triggered by the Pangandaran earthquake off the coast of Java in Indonesia.

South of Steep Point, a monument commemorates the sinking of the prawn trawler Nor 6 in 1963 and the story of the survival of its skipper, Jack Drinan.

== See also ==
- Extreme Points of Australia
