= Zuytdorp Cliffs =

Cliffs on the coast of Western Australia

Coordinates: 27°11′S 113°56′E

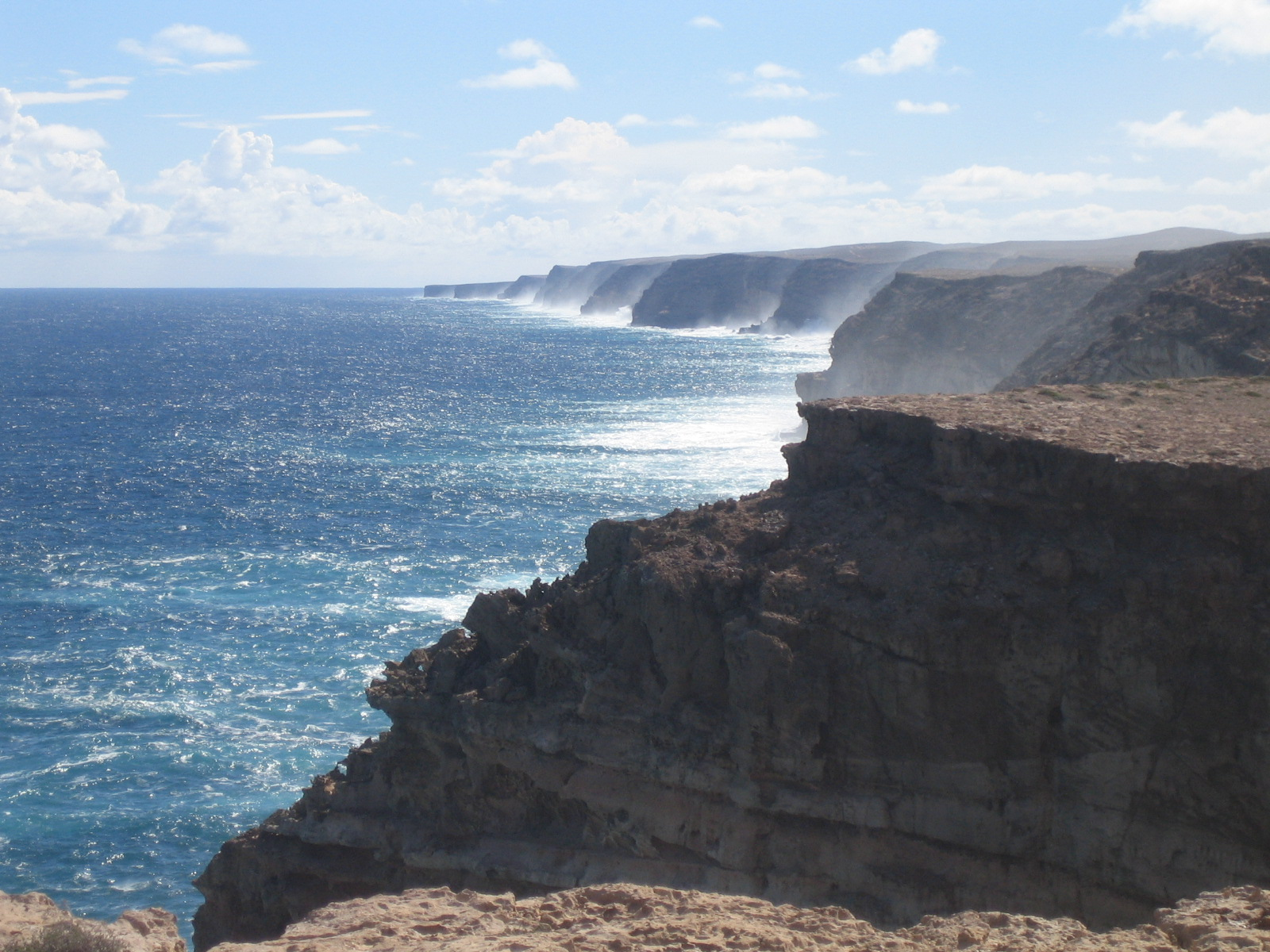

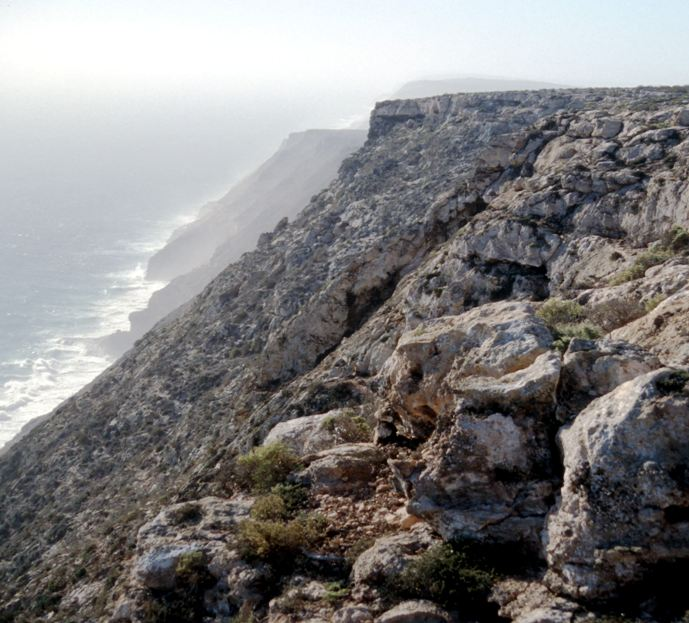

The Zuytdorp Cliffs extend for about 150 kilometres (93 mi) along the Indian Ocean coast of Western Australia. The cliffs extend from just south of the mouth of the Murchison River at Kalbarri, to Pepper Point south of Steep Point. The cliffs are situated in both the Gascoyne and Mid West regions of the state.

At the highest point, near Womerangee Hill, the top of the cliffs are 250 metres (820 ft) above the sea. They are named after Zuytdorp, a trading ship of the Dutch East India Company that was wrecked against the cliffs in 1712.

== Geology ==
The Zuytdorp Cliffs are composed of Pleistocene aged limestone, a formation called the Tamala Limestone. This limestone formed by the cementation of ancient calcareous sand dunes that accumulated near the coast during episodes of the last ice age. It has been inferred that the relatively straight edge of the cliffs is due to a major fault line just off shore.
