= Edward Hugh Barron =

Irish soldier and pioneer (1795–1863)

- Born: 8 August 1796; Donegal, Ireland
- Died: 23 February 1863 (aged 66); Perth, Western Australia
- Military career
- Allegiance: Britain
- Branch: British Army
- Rank: Colour sergeant
- Unit: 63rd Regiment of Foot

Edward Hugh Barron (8 Aug 1796 – 23 Feb 1863), was a soldier and pioneer in the Swan River Colony.

== Early life ==
Barron was born in County Donegal, Ireland. On 8 July 1817, at age 20, he joined the 63rd Regiment of Foot. On 27 November 1819 he married Jane Catherine Pearson (11 Nov 1800 – 23 Feb 1878) in Cumberland, England.

== Swan River Colony ==
Barron travelled to the Swan River Colony as colour sergeant of the 63rd Regiment on board HMS Sulphur arriving 8 June 1829. When the regiment left Western Australia in March 1834, Barron was one of eleven men allowed to stay in the colony with their wives and children.

Jane Barron is believed to have been the first European woman to step onto the shores of the colony.

== Wheat Sheaf Tavern ==
Barron opened the Wheat Sheaf Tavern at 1 Murray Street, Perth, on the north-west corner of the intersection of Murray and Barrack Street. Barron later sold this and opened the United Services Tavern in St Georges Terrace and later the Criterion Hotel on Howick Street (now Hay Street) which still trades as Perth's oldest public house.

As Barron was still in the Army, his wife Jane ran the business due to complaints from settlers regarding soldiers running businesses.

Barron ran many businesses including a dairy and built and let several houses. He also had the government contract for mail delivery between Perth and Guildford and had the contract for government stores and delivery of firewood to government offices.

== Murray district ==
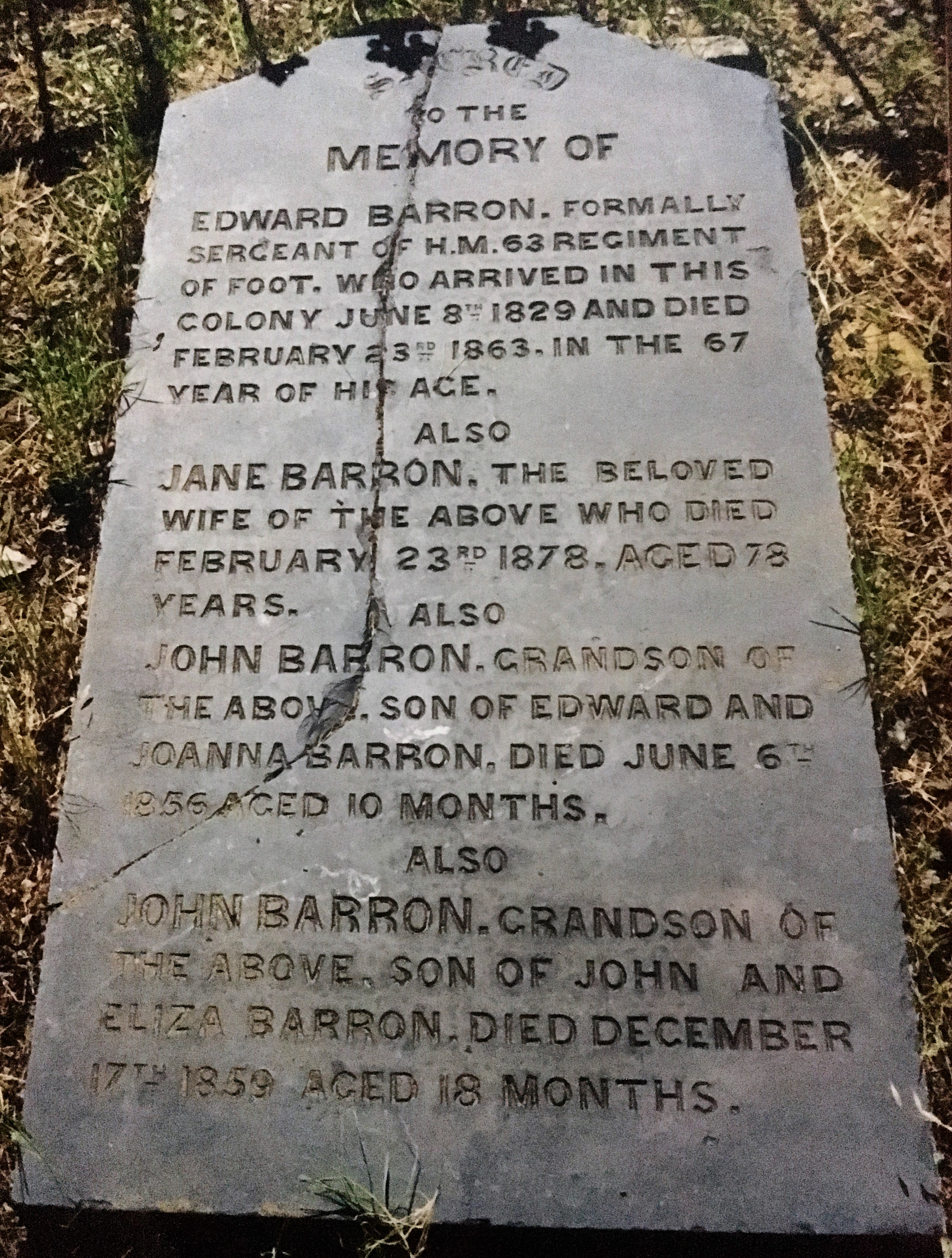
Headstone of Edward and Jane Barron in East Perth Cemeteries

On 15 July 1834 Barron travelled to Mandurah for the purpose of buying a horse from Thomas Peel. Peel told Barron the mare was lost in the bush and to wait for local Aboriginals to attend for their flour ration whereby they could be asked to show where the mare was.

The Aboriginals who attended the house indicated they did know where the mare was, and Barron and Hugh Nesbitt, of the 21st Regiment of Foot, and the group, including local Aboriginal leader Calyute, set off.

During the ride Barron and Nesbitt were ambushed, with three spears hitting Barron as he rode away and Nesbitt being killed. Barron was badly wounded and conveyed back to Perth. This incident was a catalyst for the Pinjarra Massacre.

== Later life ==
Barron and his wife Jane had 12 children, 9 of them born in the colony. Their son Edward George Barron (17 September 1829 – 4 March 1901) was reputed to be the first white child born in the colony. Three sons joined the Western Australia Police: Edward, John, and Charles.

Barron died 23 February 1863 in Perth and is interred at East Perth Cemeteries.
