= Pinjarra massacre =

Massacre in Western Australia (1834)

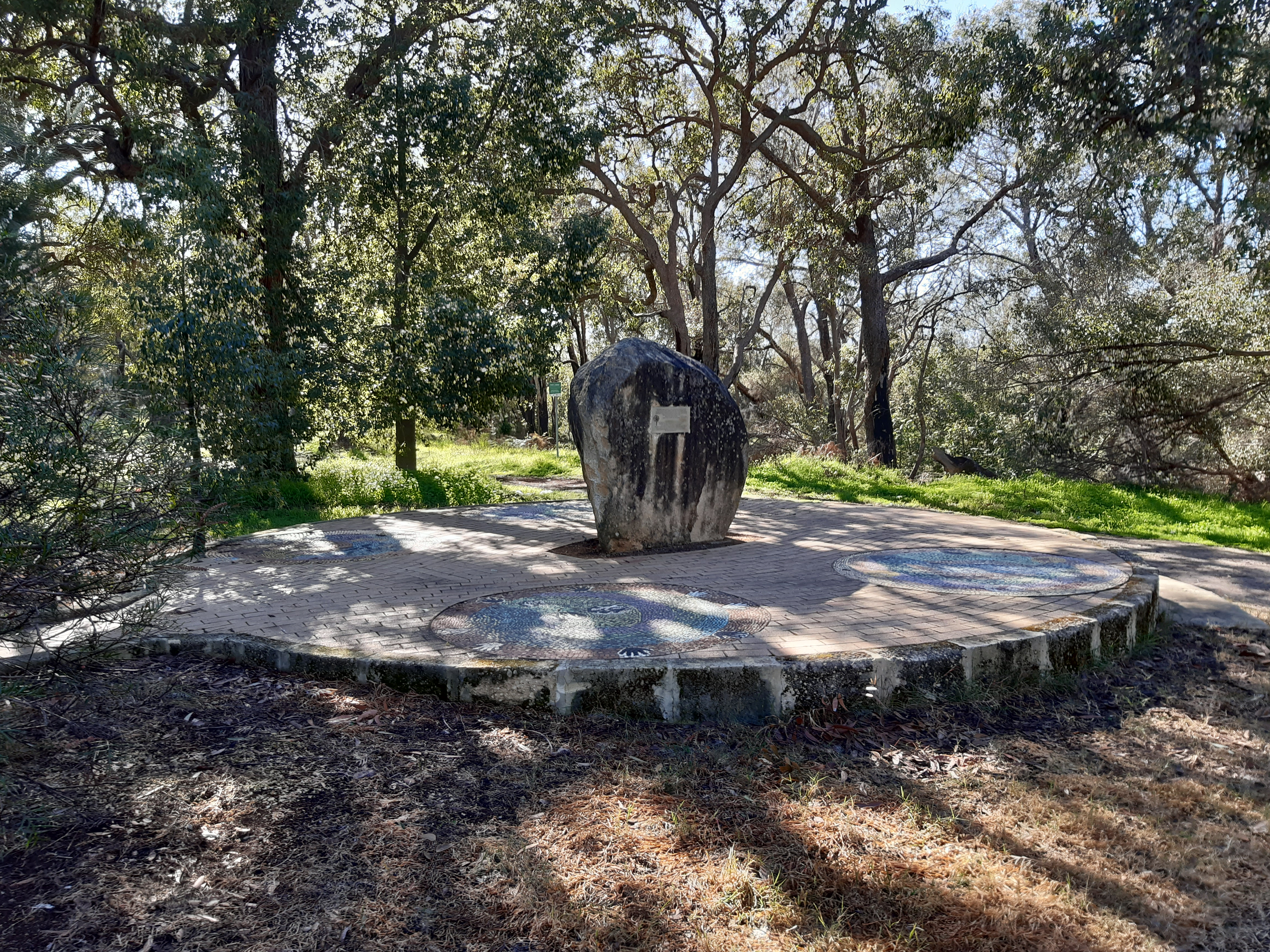
- Pinjarra massacre Site memorial
- Location: 32°37′48″S 115°52′16″E; Pinjarra, Western Australia
- Date: 28 October 1834; 8:35 am – 10:05 am (UTC+08:00)
- Target: Bindjareb Noongar people
- Attack type: Well-conceived ambush leading to a massacre lasting at least one hour.
- Weapons: Governor's detachment: muskets, bayonets; Bindjareb: spears
- Deaths: Captain Theophilus Ellis, and an estimate of 15–30 Bindjareb men, women and children were also killed. An unknown number of dead bodies were washed downstream. It is unknown if any injured Bindjareb people died as a result of injuries.
- Injuries: Corporal Patrick Heffron, and an unknown number of injured Bindjareb people.
- Victims: 15–80 Bindjareb people. Captain Ellis.
- Perpetrator: British colonists
- Assailants: Governor Captain James Stirling; John Septimus Roe; Captain Meares and his son Seymour; Thomas Peel; Captain Theophilus Tighe Ellis; Charles Norcott with five mounted police; George Smyth, surveyor; One soldier to lead a pack horse; Peel’s servant; Two Corporals and eight privates of the 21st Regiment
- No. of participants: 25 assailants and 60–80 victims
- Defender: 70–80 Bindjareb people including Calyute
- Motive: Collectively punish the Binjareb for their earlier individual attacks.; Re-establish a barracks on the road to the south.; Enable Thomas Peel to attract migrants into his lands at Mandurah.

The Pinjarra massacre, in the past called the Battle of Pinjarra, occurred on 28 October 1834 in Pinjarra, Western Australia when a group of Bindjareb Noongar people were attacked by a detachment of 25 soldiers, police, and settlers led by Governor James Stirling. According to Stirling, "about 60 or 70" of the Bindjareb people were present at the camp and John Roe, who also participated, estimated about 70–80. This roughly agrees with an estimate of 70 by an unidentified eyewitness.

Of the attackers, Captain Theophilus Tighe Ellis died and Corporal Patrick Heffron was injured. Of the attacked, an uncertain number of Bindjareb men, women, and children were killed. Stirling quantified the number of Bindjareb people killed as probably 15 males; Roe estimated the number killed as between 15 and 20. An unidentified settler eyewitness counted about 25–30 dead, including a woman and several children, but also suggested it was "very probable that more men were killed in the river and floated down with the stream". The number of Bindjareb people injured remains uncertain, as do the number of deaths resulting from injuries sustained during the attack. However, both Bindjareb oral histories and the eyewitness put the number of dead and injured higher than Stirling and Roe did.

The Pinjarra massacre was the culmination of increasing tension and violence between newly arrived settlers, who were appropriating the land for farming, and the Noongar peoples, who lived on it as hunter-gatherers. After the attack, Governor Stirling was "effectively threatening to kill 80% of the Noongar population of the South West". Stirling claimed as justification for the attack that the Bindjareb had threatened to "destroy all the whites in their district". Some Bindjareb did continue to fight back, while others sought peace.

The effects of the massacre's outcome were devastating for the Bindjareb, allowing "surrounding groups to exploit the weakness of the once powerful Bindjareb". Despite this, some of the younger generation of Bindjareb (notably Calyute's son Monang and another individual called Denmar) later became involved with the newcomers. Indeed, Monang, some of his counterparts, and those who came after, were to contribute in a variety of ways to the development of the area into what it is today. Monang and Denmar, both involved in the murder of Nesbit, and originally on the list of wanted Noongar men, in fact became the first Aboriginal policemen at Pinjarra in 1838. Monang also developed a close association with Henry Bunbury and would accompany Bunbury on his expeditions. Presently, the Bindjareb Noongar people remain custodians and representatives of their culture, and still live on their ancestral lands.

== Background ==
There had been numerous Aboriginal attacks on settlers in the preceding years. Notably, in February 1832, Private George Budge was ambushed by Bindjareb Nyungars, and speared to death near Peel’s garden. The following July, Sergeant Wood of the 63rd Regiment was speared and nearly killed. This was followed in July 1834 by the ambush and murder of Hugh Nesbitt, a servant of Thomas Peel and the wounding of Edward Barron. Following the Binjareb looting, by means of armed robbery, of the flour mill that provided rations to settlers and Noongars in the district, as well as the murder and mutilation of Nesbitt, Captain Frederick Irwin, the lieutenant governor in Stirling's absence, is said to have inflamed the situation by adopting a soldier's attitude to crush a warlike group of Aboriginals and reduce them to a state of subjection.

It was this unyielding, overbearing attitude that had alienated [Irwin] from the body of Swan River settlers and caused them to burn him in effigy on the eve of his departure. It was a narrow, regimented view of frontier problems and, perhaps, part of the blame for the Pinjarra massacre can be attributed to Irwin and his unsympathetic administration of Aboriginal affairs during James Stirling's absence.

Stirling had been visiting the 400-kilometre-distant (250 mi) seaport of Albany and bad weather caused his return to be delayed until September. In response to calls from Pinjarra settlers for protection against the increased hostility of local Binjareb Noongars led by Calyute, Stirling organised a mounted force of police, bushmen and ex-soldiers. Their brief was to protect settlers, safeguard Aboriginal mail-carriers and confront the Binjareb on the Murray River. A small garrison at Dandalup had also been withdrawn from fear of Aboriginal reprisals.

The Binjareb tribe had a reputation with other local Aboriginal tribes for their aggression and attacks on other Aboriginal people and settlers. It is possible that their motives for attacking the local settlers were part of an attempt to assert their power amongst other local tribes and to take advantage of the political upheaval caused by the arrival of the British settlers, and the death of many Perth Wadjuk people. Stirling and others, drawing on the experience of Scottish clans and native American Indians of North America, were afraid of a possible alliance between the Binjareb and Weeip's Wadjuk people in the Upper Swan, and sought to prevent such an alliance by an attack on the Aboriginal people to the south. Stirling's attack at Pinjarra was specifically to collectively punish the Binjareb for their earlier individual attacks, to re-establish a barracks on the road to the south, and to enable Peel to attract settlers into his lands at Mandurah. This followed an earlier failure by Surveyor General Septimus Roe and pastoralist Thomas Peel, who had led an expedition to the area with the goal of improving security and negotiating peaceful co-existence. Stirling wanted a "decisive action" that would end the attacks "once and for all".

== Preparations ==
Stirling had wanted to begin on 17 October, but a Murray man seen in Perth was suspected of being a spy for Calyute and so the expedition was delayed one week.

On the morning of Saturday 25 October, Stirling and Roe left Perth and travelled southwards to the Preston Ferry, there waiting for surveyor George Smyth and Corporal Julius Delmage, who had brought supplies south by boat from Perth. Spare horses from the ferry were loaded with supplies as the party set off to Hamilton Hill, skirting Fremantle to the east. There they were joined by Ellis and the five mounted police, superintendent Richard Meares and his son, Seymour. They then rode south to Peel's homestead where they were joined by Peel and two others. On the morning of 27 October, ten soldiers of the 21st Regiment, two corporals and eight privates, arrived to join the party. Ammunition was issued to a party on 27 October 1834, and they were issued with several weeks' supplies, as the soldiers were to remain at Pinjarra and establish the planned garrison there. Leaving Peel's farm they crossed the Serpentine River and went forward to the Murray delta where tracks of a sizeable group of Aboriginal men women and children were discovered heading towards Pinjarra. In the late afternoon, they camped at Jinjanuk, 16 kilometres (10 mi) from the mouth of the Murray River, so that they could begin the attack early next morning when they judged the Aboriginal group would be least prepared.

== Massacre ==
The group woke two hours before dawn on 28 October and ate breakfast in the dark. By 8:00 am, the party had rejoined the Murray where the river was 30 metres (98 ft) wide, between steep red loam banks, continuing northwards to cross the Oakley brook at about 8:35 am. Peel approached along the western bank of the river and returned to tell of a settlement of about 20 bark beehive-shaped mia-mias in the bend of the river. The weather broke and it started to rain heavily as Ellis, Charles Norcott, and three of the police attacked from the south.

The initial encounter resulted in the spearing of Superintendent Ellis of the Mounted Police, who later died of his wounds, and a speared trooper who survived. The Aboriginal males who threw spears were fatally shot. The tribe ran from that initial encounter to the river. Men, women and children were surrounded and overpowered in a riverbed.

Stirling, hearing the shots, reacted quickly. Roe was sent with four others to prevent the group escaping south and guard the pack horses at the ford. The governor and 14 others in a line abreast then ambushed the Noongar people who had crossed the river. Ellis had been dislodged from his horse but Norcott continued pushing the group into the river where they were caught in a withering crossfire. The flood-scoured slopes gave the men, women and children little cover as they tried to hide behind what logs or bushes there were. Many ducked into the water, holding their breath as long as they could. Some tried to float downstream out of range, but the water was too shallow to permit their escape. They, too, were shot. Roe's journal records "Very few wounded were suffered to escape". Soldiers fired indiscriminately at those caught in the ambush and, when all had been slain, the posse remounted to chase the others who had fled north into the bush. By 10:05 am it was all over and, because of the serious condition of two of the British wounded, Stirling returned immediately to Mandurah.

== Casualties ==
On the Aboriginal side, there are conflicting reports. 60–70 Aboriginal men, women and children in the camp had been subjected to intensive fire of 24 guns for an hour, and for another half-hour the survivors were hunted through the bush. No male prisoners were taken alive and all wounded were immediately shot. At the end of hostilities, eight women and a few children were taken as captives. In his report, Stirling claimed 15 Aboriginal men had been killed. Roe estimated the dead at 15–20. But these numbers do not seem to have included women and children. Captain Daniel, whom Stirling later sent to survey the site of the incident, implied that many more were killed than officially acknowledged, as he found several mass graves, but the rain and his fear of an attack made exhuming the bodies for an official count impossible. Advocate-General George Fletcher Moore estimated from his own investigations (he was not present) that between 25 and 30 were left dead on the field and in the river.

On the settlers side, Heffron was wounded in the arm, but recovered. Ellis was suffering concussion, either from a glancing blow from a spear or from the fall off his horse, and died on 11 November, having been in a coma for two weeks. Later that week The Jackets of Green, a folk ballad honouring Ellis, was published and sheet music sold at hotels in Guildford and Perth.

The colony's native interpreter, Francis Armstrong, was given a woomera by a survivor shortly after the ambush, a description of which was printed in the Perth Gazette; an image drawn on the object depicted a river, horses, humans and the graves of the slain. Armstrong and Peel later attempted an official count by interviewing the Aboriginals Ninda and Colling, who had been present. Some 11 names were given but, in view of the prohibition in Noongar culture against speaking of the dead, their task was almost impossible. Amongst the dead were Unia, Calyute's youngest son, and Gummol who had been flogged for his part in the earlier attack on Shenton's Mill. Two of Calyute's wives were amongst the wounded; Yornup's lower leg had been shot away, and Mindip had been shot in the left arm and right thigh.

At the end of the hostilities, Stirling gave the Noongar people a terrifying threat. If there were any retaliatory payback killings from the Binjareb, he declared, "no one would be allowed to remain alive on this side of the Mountains" (the Darling Scarp).

== Consequences ==
The massacre seemed to have increased and intensified the settlers' fears rather than allayed them. The belief that Aboriginal people would unite to drive the colonists out persisted into the 1850s when there was another massacre of Aboriginals gathering for a corroboree at Whiteman Park near Guildford. Mounted police continued regular patrols in the area, and the police force at Mandurah continued, though there was no further trouble. Peel continued to call for action to wipe out and exterminate the rest of the Binjareb, whom he called "a nest of hornets", although there were no further payback reprisals.

The killing of so many Binjareb caused a major population imbalance between rival Aboriginal groups, with Swan and Canning Wadjuk and York Balardong attempting to profit from the decimation of the Murray Binjareb. Stirling also personally profited, as he was able to take ownership of Binjareb lands in the Harvey district, untroubled.

Five months after the massacre, the Murray group sent a deputation to the governor seeking an end to hostilities and the later killings that had followed. Maigo, of the Wadjuk, went as a messenger, and the Binjareb promised support for actions of the governor. With the Wadjuk camped at the fresh water Doodinup spring at what is now Spring Street, and the Binjareb camped at the Deedyallup water-hole, near the present ABC building in Fielder Street, East Perth, a joint corroboree and distribution of 50 loaves of bread sealed the peace. Calyute survived the massacre, but his continued existence annoyed Peel. Calyute equally hated Peel, biting his beard whenever he saw his old enemy.

== Back to Pinjarra Day ==
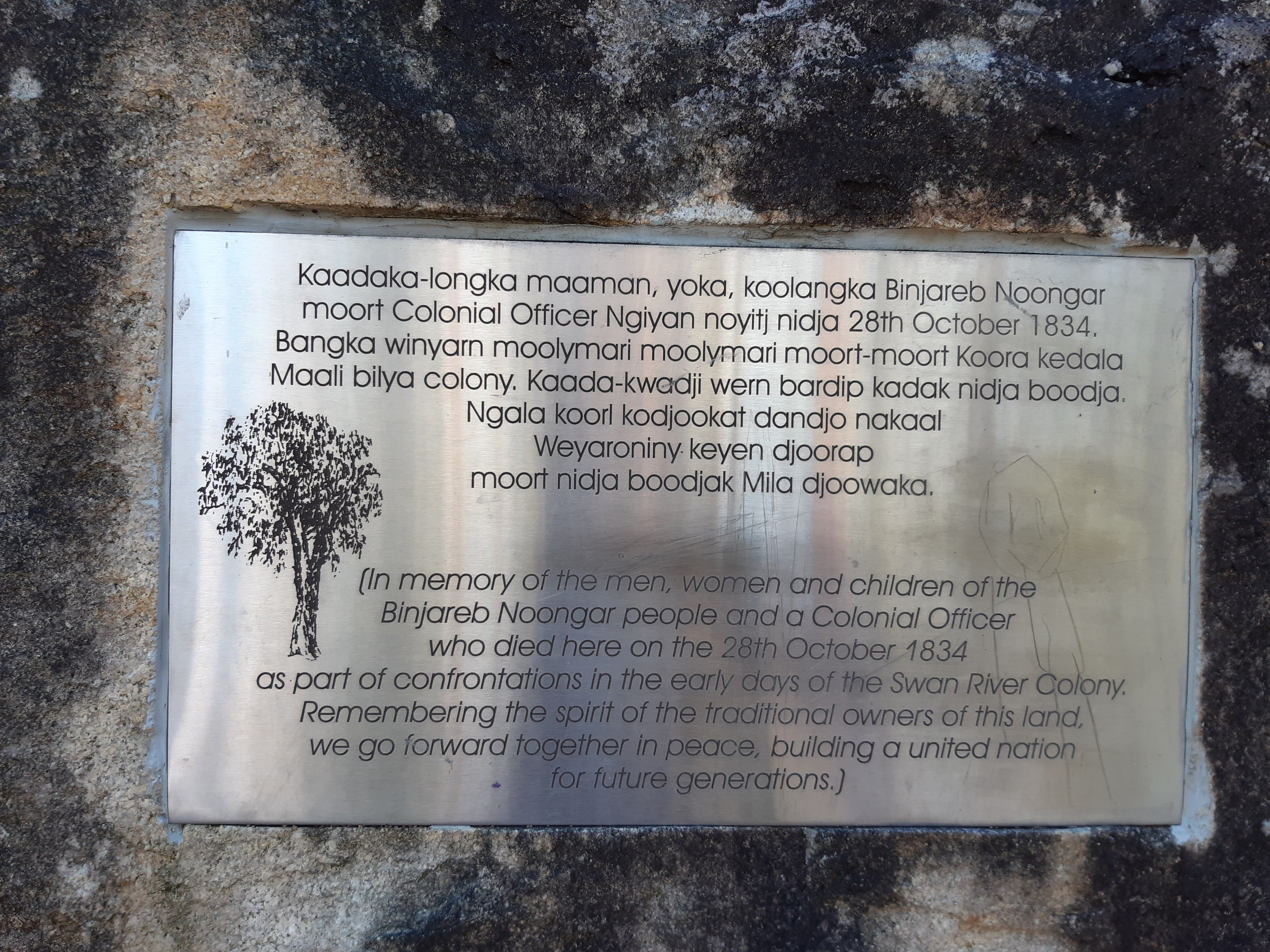
Plaque at the memorial site

Since 1991, the massacre is annually remembered by the Binjareb people on 28 October; the commemoration is named Back to Pinjarra Day. Binjareb Noongar man Theo Kearing and his wife Roseanne Kearing were central figures in starting this memorial, after many years of work, to have the event recognised as a massacre. It is performed at a memorial site in Pinjarra.

== Apology ==
On 28 October 2025, Western Australian governor Chris Dawson formally apologised for the massacre at a ceremony in Pinjarra.

== See also ==
- Australian frontier wars
- List of massacres in Australia
