= Adam Armstrong (settler) =

Pioneer to Colony of Western Australia

Adam Pearson Armstrong (23 February 1788 – 28 September 1853) was an early European settler in the Perth suburb of Dalkeith in Western Australia. The suburb is named after Armstrong's cottage. Armstrong influenced development in the Swan River colony with properties in both Dalkeith and in his later property in Ravenswood.

== Early life ==
Armstrong was born on 23 February 1788 in Smeaton, near Dalkeith, Midlothian, Scotland. His middle name Pearson was not on his birth certificate.

In 1810 he married Margaret Gow, whose father Nathaniel Gow (1763–1831) and grandfather Niel Gow (1727–1807) were celebrated Scottish musicians. Musical interests were evident in the family, and a harmonium they brought out is displayed, with other family memorabilia, in the Azelia Ley Homestead Museum in Hamilton Hill.

In 1811, Armstrong bought a part of the Drum coalfield in Scotland. However the Drum Colliery Company failed due to flooding issues and the availability of cheaper coal from England. Armstrong moved his family to England and then to Wales. In Wales, his last position prior to moving to London was as an agent for William Edward Powell, who owned the Nanteos estate. Such was the friendship between the two that when Armstrong's only daughter was born he named her after Powell's wife Laura. Armstrong was dismissed from Nanteos and went to London, where he found clerical work with Thomas Peel at 1 Eagle Place, Piccadilly. Peel was taking up an offer by Captain James Stirling to provide free settlers the opportunity to move to the new settlement on the Swan River in Western Australia.

It was reported he later commanded a Highland Regiment at the Battle of Waterloo in 1815. However claims towards having lost an eye in the battle have been dismissed, as he was in Edinburgh forestalling bankruptcy just months before, and had no time to "pursue a military career to the rank and prestige that was attributed to him".

== Australia ==
Peel had been promised land grants if he arrived at the colony before 1 November 1829, and on arrival with the Armstrongs on Gilmore on 15 December 1829 discovered this land had been given to someone else. His other ships, Rockingham and Hooghly, were also carrying settlers so he was persuaded to accept an area of land named Clarence, between the present day suburbs of Mandurah and Rockingham and inland to Pinjarra. Armstrong was Peel's surveyor and he took up a parcel of land with good water to establish a farm on the Murray River that he named Ravenswood, establishing one of many Scottish connections. The family struggled to survive initially, in shelters made of wooden horse stalls, barrels and canvas, and eating food mostly brought by English ships. Attempts at farming were unsuccessful because of winter flooding and the theft of stock, so six families who had hoped to live there all returned to Perth and Fremantle.

Armstrong acquired land in Fremantle, lot numbers P99 and P84 around Thompson Street, Harbour Street Laneway and Quarry Street. He had befriended Mark John Currie, the harbour master who lived on Crawley Bay, and the Armstrong children were to stay there until their father found a better place. Armstrong had no money for provisions, relying on loans to buy food for his family. He was granted Swan Location 85 comprising 130 hectares (320 acres) on 18 September 1831. He dug the water well that can still be seen at the site, built a cottage on the foreshore using limestone from the cliff, becoming Nedlands' first European settler.

The surrounding bush and pastureland was cultivated successfully by the Armstrong family, with Adam naming their new home Dalkeith Cottage after the Scottish town where he grew up. When he came to sell his land in 1838, he had developed a farm of about 2 hectares (5 acres) on the fertile soil of the foreshore of Melville Water. The farm vines were expected to produce 1,500 kilograms (3,400 lb) of grapes and, as well as other fruit and vegetables, over 4,100 kilograms (9,000 lb) of melons, while as a goat run it was unsurpassed. However, although the Dalkeith farm was successful and recognised throughout the colony, it could not grow wheat nor support enough cattle to sustain his family. In October 1853, Dalkeith Cottage of 140 hectares (350 acres) of land with a garden of 2 hectares (5 acres) was offered for sale or let, with vines and melons, with buildings and stock yard, to "be sold a bargain, as the present proprietor is going to the Murray".

== Later life ==
Armstrong had several children, of whom six survived:

- Francis (Frank) Fraser Armstrong, 22 February 1813 – 22 May 1897, born in Edinburgh, married Mary Ann Mews, with at least fourteen children. He served as a police officer, school headmaster, and interpreter to Aboriginal Australians
- George Drummond Armstrong, 1817–1886, born in England; married Mary Ann Kenton (died 31 March 1861)
- John Gow Armstrong, 1818 – 22 March 1853, born in Wales, married Eleanor Kenton, died at Murray River
- Laura Powell Armstrong, 1819–1901, born in Wales; married Thomas Montgomery
- Adam Armstrong, 1821–1902, born in Wales; married Louisa Jones
- Christopher Armstrong, 1823–1897, born in Wales; married Mary Cooper.

Upon leaving Dalkeith, Armstrong returned to his former cottage at Ravenswood, Murray River, where he spent his remaining days in relative prosperity. He died there "after a long and painful illness" (also given as "Paralysis and general decay of nature") on 28 September 1853, when he was 67 years.

== Posterity ==
The name Dalkeith has survived and now refers to the Perth suburb of Dalkeith, considered one of the most expensive and wealthiest in Australia. It is also considerably larger than Armstrong's initial land grant. The oldest maps name the area Melville Waters, with early settlers actually living in what was called Claremont. Later, city developers tried to sell the township of South Nedlands, but the name Dalkeith survived, as a legacy of Armstrong, the first settler. His descendants still have strong connections to the Murray area as well as spreading all over the world. While the initial link with Dalkeith was broken, some descendants have since returned and made their own contributions to the City of Nedlands community.
