= List of shipwrecks in May 1830 =

The list of shipwrecks in May 1830 includes ships sunk, foundered, grounded, or otherwise lost during May 1830.

== 3 May ==
List of shipwrecks: 3 May 1830
Ship	State	Description
Margaret	United Kingdom	The brig was driven ashore at Liverpool, Lancashire. She was on a voyage from Liverpool to Belfast, County Antrim.

== 5 May ==
List of shipwrecks: 5 May 1830
Ship	State	Description
George	United Kingdom	The ship capsized off Shoreham-by-Sea, Sussex. Her crew were rescued. She was later taken in to port.

== 7 May ==
List of shipwrecks: 7 May 1830
Ship	State	Description
Mary	United Kingdom	The ship departed from Mauritius for London. No further trace, presumed foundered with the loss of all hands.

== 9 May ==
List of shipwrecks: 9 May 1830
Ship	State	Description
Acorn	United Kingdom	The ship was driven ashore and wrecked at Sunderland, County Durham with the loss of two of her crew. She was on a voyage from Colchester, Essex to Sunderland.
Adriana	Kingdom of the Two Sicilies	The ship was wrecked on the Goodwin Sands, Kent, United Kingdom Her crew were rescued. She was on a voyage from Trapani to Bergen, Norway.
Agenoria	United Kingdom	The ship was driven ashore near Lindisfarne, Northumberland.
Albany	United Kingdom	The ship was driven ashore and wrecked at Sunderland.
Ann	United Kingdom	The schooner was driven ashore and wrecked at Sunderland with the loss of two of her crew.
Barbara	United Kingdom	The ship sank at Sunderland.
Bellona	United Kingdom	The ship was driven ashore and wrecked at Tunstall, Yorkshire. Her crew were rescued. She was on a voyage from London to Sunderland.
Charlotte Christine	Hamburg	The ship was driven ashore and wrecked near Hornsea, Yorkshire. She was on a voyage from Hamburg to Wells-next-the-Sea, Norfolk.
Cyrus	United Kingdom	The ship was driven ashore and wrecked at South Shields, County Durham. Her crew were rescued. She was on a voyage from Aberdeen to London.
Dasher	United Kingdom	The sloop was driven ashore and wrecked at Sunderland.
Die Frau Melina	flag unknown	The ship was driven ashore and wrecked near "Sister Churches", Yorkshire with the loss of all hands.
Doggerbank	Sweden	The galiot was wrecked near Whitby, Yorkshire. Her six crew were rescued. She was on a voyage from Karlskrona to Amsterdam, North Holland, Netherlands.
Eleanor	United Kingdom	The ship sank at Sunderland.
Eliza	United Kingdom	The ship was driven ashore near Lindisfarne.
Elizabeth	United Kingdom	The brig foundered in the North Sea off the coast of Yorkshire.
Farmer	United Kingdom	The ship was driven ashore and wrecked at Sunderland.
Frau Metta	(Denmark) Duchy of Holstein	The ship capsized in the North Sea off Withernsea, East Riding of Yorkshire with the loss of all hands. The wreck subsequently came ashore. She was on a voyage from Carolinensiel to Hull, Yorkshire.
Helena	United Kingdom	The ship was wrecked on rocks at Boulmer, Northumberland. She was on a voyage from Berwick-upon-Tweed to Newcastle upon Tyne.
Hero	United Kingdom	The ship was driven ashore and wrecked at Cowden, Yorkshire. Her eleven crew survived.
John	United Kingdom	The ship sank at Sunderland.
Jubilee	United Kingdom	The ship was driven ashore near Lindisfarne.
Lady Milner	United Kingdom	The ship was driven ashore at Bridlington, Yorkshire. She was refloated on 21 May.
Lord Nelson	United Kingdom	The schooner was driven ashore and wrecked at Sunderland.
Lovely Ann	United Kingdom	The ship was driven ashore at Bridlington. The ship later broke up.
Mackerill	(United Kingdom of Great Britain and Ireland) Guernsey	The ship was driven ashore and wrecked at Bridlington. Her crew were rescued.
Merchants' Friend	United Kingdom	The ship sank at Sunderland.
Milton	United Kingdom	The ship was driven ashore at Sunderland.
Polly	United Kingdom	The ship was dfriven ashore at Bridlington. She was refloated on 21 May.
St. Albans	United Kingdom	The sloop was driven ashore and wrecked at Sunderland.

== 10 May ==
List of shipwrecks: 10 May 1830
Ship	State	Description
Byron	United Kingdom	The schooner was driven ashore and wrecked at South Shields, County Durham.
De Hoffnung	Netherlands	The galiot was driven ashore and wrecked at Hornsea, Yorkshire with the loss of all but her captain of her four crew. She was on a voyage from Glückstadt, Kingdom of Hanover to Hull, Yorkshire.
Fort Augustus	United Kingdom	The ship was driven ashore at Barmston, Yorkshire. Her crew were rescued. She was on a voyage from London to South Shields, County Durham. Fort Augustus was refloated on 8 June and taken in to Bridlington, Yorkshire.
Progress	United Kingdom	The ship was driven ashore near Waxholme, Yorkshire. She was on a voyage from Sunderland, County Durham to Portsmouth, Hampshire.
Repute	United Kingdom	The ship was driven ashore at Bridlington, Yorkshire. She was on a voyage from Goole, Yorkshire to London. She was refloated on 22 May.
Thomas and Alice	United Kingdom	The ship was driven ashore and wrecked near Hornsea, Yorkshire. Her crew were rescued.

== 13 May ==
List of shipwrecks: 13 May 1830
Ship	State	Description
Matilda	United Kingdom	The brig was struck by lightning, set afire and destroyed by and explosion in the Bonny River, Nigeria. Over 100 people died. Of her crew, there were two survivors, who were ashore at the time.

== 14 May ==
List of shipwrecks: 14 May 1830
Ship	State	Description
Aventure	French Navy	Blockade of Algiers:The Brigantine was wrecked at Kabylia, Algeria 60 miles east of Algiers, Algeria. 200 on board made it to shore and were captured. They were marched to Algiers. On the march 108 were beheaded.

== 15 May ==
List of shipwrecks: 15 May 1830
Ship	State	Description
Alexandrina	Sweden	The ship foundered in the North Sea off Domesnes, Norway. Her crew were rescued. She was on a voyage from Dordrecht, South Holland, Netherlands to Stockholm.
Friends	United Kingdom	The ship was wrecked on "Cape Sabte". Her crew were rescued.

== 17 May ==
List of shipwrecks: 17 May 1830
Ship	State	Description
Charlton Whitall	United Kingdom	The ship departed from Bermuda for Gibraltar. No further trace, presumed foundered in the Atlantic Ocean with the loss of all hands.

== 18 May ==
List of shipwrecks: 18 May 1830
Ship	State	Description
Amelia	(United Kingdom of Great Britain and Ireland) New South Wales	The cutter departed from Swan River. No further trace, presumed foundered with the loss of all on board.
Bon Vivant	(United Kingdom of Great Britain and Ireland) British North America	The ship was driven ashore and wrecked south of Portneuf, Lower Canada.

== 20 May ==
List of shipwrecks: 20 May 1830
Ship	State	Description
Bombay	United Kingdom	The ship was wrecked at the Swan River Colony.
Emily and Taylor	United Kingdom	The ship was wrecked at the Swan River Colony.
Hector	Netherlands	The ship was wrecked off "Porto Laguero". Her crew were rescued. She was on a voyage from Antwerp to Bahia, Brazil.
Innes	United Kingdom	The ship was wrecked at the Swan River Colony.
Julias Magdalena	Rostock	The ketch was wrecked on the Goodwin Sands, Kent, United Kingdom. Her crew were rescued. She was on a voyage from Rostock to Havre de Grâce, Seine-Inférieure, France.
Rockingham	United Kingdom	The ship was wrecked at the Swan River Colony.
Thames	United Kingdom	The ship was wrecked at the Swan River Colony.

== 22 May ==
List of shipwrecks: 22 May 1830
Ship	State	Description
Fula de Rama	Spain	The ship foundered in the Atlantic Ocean off Faial, Azores, Portugal. Her crew were rescued. She was on a voyage from Cuba to Cádiz.
Thames	United Kingdom	The ship was driven ashore by a gale at Fremantle, Swan River Colony.

== 24 May ==
List of shipwrecks: 24 May 1830
Ship	State	Description
Agnete Christine	Denmark	The ship foundered off "Hilleroe". She was on a voyage from Stege to Bergen, Norway.
Missionary	United Kingdom	The ship was sunk by ice off "Dagerot". Her crew survived. She was on a voyage from King's Lynn, Norfolk to Saint Petersburg, Russia.

== 28 May ==
List of shipwrecks: 28 May 1830
Ship	State	Description
Juno	United Kingdom	The ship was driven ashore near Thisted, Denmark. Her crew were rescued. She was on a voyage from London to Gothenburg, Sweden.

== 31 May ==
List of shipwrecks: 31 May 1830
Ship	State	Description
Mansfield	United Kingdom	The ship was wrecked on Flint Island, Nova Scotia, British North America. She was on a voyage from Bristol, Gloucestershire to Quebec City, Lower Canada, British North America.
Nelly	United Kingdom	The ship was wrecked near Cape Chapeau Rouge, Newfoundland, British North America. Her crew survived. She was on a voyage from South Shields, County Durham to Quebec City.

== Unknown date ==
List of shipwrecks: Unknown date 1830
Ship	State	Description
Colossus	United Kingdom	The ship was wrecked on the Florida Reef before 20 May. She was on a voyage from New Orleans, Louisiana, United States to Liverpool, Lancashire.
Economy	United Kingdom	The ship foundered in the Atlantic Ocean with some loss of life. Survivors were rescued by Thomas (United Kingdom).
Elisabeth	(United Kingdom of Great Britain and Ireland) New South Wales	The ship was wrecked whilst on a voyage from Sydney to Newcastle, New South Wales.
Erato	United Kingdom	The ship foundered in the Atlantic Ocean off the Azores, Portugal. She was on a voyage from Sunderland, County Durham to Quebec City, Lower Canada, British North America.
Faune	French Navy	The brig was wrecked in the Bay of Algiers between 14 and 16 May. Survivors were murdered by the Algerians.
Palinure	French Navy	The brig was wrecked in the Bay of Algiers between 14 and 16 March. Her survivors were murdered by Algerians.
HMS Rattlesnake	Royal Navy	The Atholl-class corvette was driven ashore and damaged at Algiers, Algeria between 14 and 16 May. She was later repaired and returned to service.
Wilberforce	United Kingdom	The ship foundered in the Atlantic Ocean. Her crew were rescued.
