= Coogee =

Coogee may refer to:

- Coogee, New South Wales, a suburb of Sydney
- South Coogee, a suburb of Sydney
- Electoral district of Coogee, an electoral district in the New South Wales Legislative Assembly
- Coogee, Western Australia, a suburb of Perth, Western Australia
