= Frances Deborah Levvy =

Australian animal welfare advocate (1831–1924)

Deborah Frances Levey
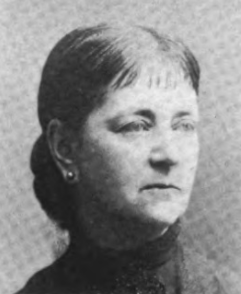
- Levvy, as pictured in the 1914 edition of The National Humane Review
- Born: Deborah Frances Levey; 14 November 1831; Penrith, New South Wales, Australia
- Died: 29 November 1924 (aged 93); Waverley, New South Wales, Australia
- Burial place: Randwick General Cemetery, South Coogee
- Occupations: Animal welfare advocate; humane education organiser; editor; writer
- Years active: 1884–1923
- Known for: Founding and serving as honorary secretary of the women's branch of the RSPCA in Australia; co-founding the first Australian Band of Mercy; editor of the Band of Mercy and Humane Journal of New South Wales
- Father: Barnett Levey
- Relatives: Solomon Levey (uncle); Joshua Josephson (uncle)

Frances Deborah Levvy (born Deborah Frances Levey; 14 November 1831 – 29 November 1924) was an Australian animal welfare advocate, humane education organiser, editor, and writer. A leading figure in the early humane movement, she helped establish the first Australian Band of Mercy in 1884 with her sister Emma and, in 1886, founded a women's branch of the RSPCA in Australia, serving for several years as its honorary secretary. For more than three decades she edited and largely wrote the Band of Mercy and Humane Journal of New South Wales (1887–1923), which reported on animal welfare campaigns, school initiatives, and humane education. Her publications circulated widely in Australia and overseas, and she was noted for using journalism to promote compassion toward animals and to involve children and women in reform. Levvy's work contributed to the spread of humane education in New South Wales schools with support from the Department of Public Instruction.

== Biography ==
=== Early life and background ===
Levvy was born Deborah Frances Levey on 14 November 1831 in Penrith, New South Wales. She was the youngest of four children of Sarah Emma (née Wilson) and Barnett Levey. Her siblings were Emma Rebecca (born 1826), Barnett Francis (born 1827), and Jacob Philip (born 1829). She was a niece of Solomon Levey and the judge Joshua Josephson. Her father, who founded Australia's first theatre and worked as a watchmaker, died in 1837. He has been described as the first Jew to voluntarily emigrate to Australia, and his wife also emigrated voluntarily.

After her father's death, the family faced financial hardship and converted to Anglicanism. In her will, Levvy's mother changed the family surname from Levey to Levvy, a spelling later adopted by Frances and her sister Emma. Levvy remained a Christian throughout her life and later donated money to missionary work promoting conversion among Jewish people.

=== Personal life ===
In the 1860s, Levvy became involved in a legal dispute with Arthur John Robey, a struggling solicitor with whom she was staying in Armidale. She lent him £100 at 6 percent interest, later raised to 10 percent, but he was bankrupted after the Kempsey floods destroyed his home and assets. When she sought repayment, the court found no fraud or professional misconduct, ruling that the loan was a private matter. Robey's repeated insolvencies left Levvy unable to recover her money, though his conduct was described as imprudent rather than dishonest.

In 1874, Levvy moved to Newtown with her sister following the death of her brother-in-law, Dr George Thomas Clarke. She had lived with the Clarkes prior to his death.

Levvy also belonged to the Girls' Friendly Society and the Church of England Temperance Society. She donated money to the London Society for Promoting Christianity Amongst the Jews.

=== Animal welfare and humane education ===
==== Humane movement leadership ====
In December 1886, Levvy helped to establish and served as honorary secretary of a women's branch of the RSPCA in Australia. After an extortion case involving a staff member in 1896, the British RSPCA withdrew its association with the Australian branch, but Levvy continued her work and reorganised the group as the Women's Society for the Prevention of Cruelty to Animals.

The Bands of Mercy movement, originally founded in Britain in the 1870s to encourage children to protect animals and act kindly toward them, spread to the United States in 1882. In Australia, Levvy and her sister established the first Band of Mercy on 4 January 1884. By 1889, Levvy reported that 446 Bands of Mercy had been established across Australia. The New South Wales Department of Public Instruction supported her work, granting £50 for her to visit schools and promote the movement. She maintained extensive correspondence and made numerous school visits as part of this effort. By 1920, the Bands of Mercy in Australia had an estimated 60,000 members organised into 131 groups.

==== Journal and outreach ====
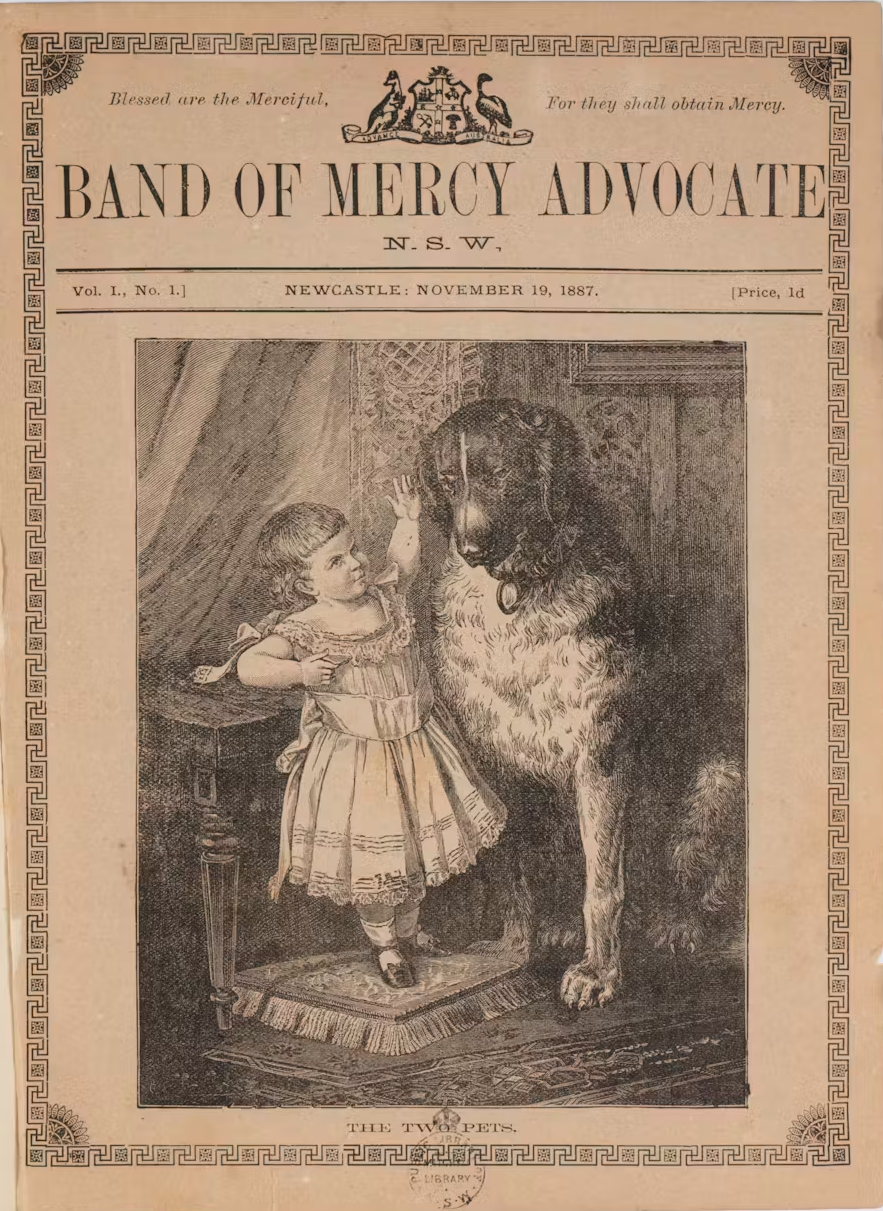
First issue of the Band of Mercy Advocate, 1887

From 1887 to 1923, Levvy published the Band of Mercy and Humane Journal of New South Wales, a monthly periodical that she largely wrote and edited. Issued continuously from July 1887 to August 1923, the magazine was intended for both children and adults and reported on the activities of the Bands of Mercy and the Women's Society for the Prevention of Cruelty to Animals. It covered topics such as proposals for a lethal chamber for the humane killing of stray dogs and fundraising for a horse ambulance. The journal circulated widely, reaching readers in Australia, England, America, and parts of Asia, and Levvy also distributed copies personally to cab drivers, draymen, and others working with animals in Sydney. She reviewed submissions and frequently added editorial commentary, as well as contributing poems and short stories. The periodical also inspired companion publications, including the Band of Mercy Advocate (1887–1891).

Levvy became well known for her writing and her effective use of the periodical press to promote kindness to animals and report on educational work. She encouraged essay writing and classroom discussion on animal welfare. Her publication helped to expand public engagement with animal protection and brought wider attention to the humane movement in Australia.

=== Death and legacy ===
In her later years she experienced blindness, was bedridden, and became almost deaf, but continued to oversee publication of her journal. She died on 29 November 1924 at her home in Waverley. On 1 December, she was buried at Randwick General Cemetery, South Coogee. Her will requested she be buried with her sister's oil paintings.

Former New South Wales Minister for Education Joseph Carruthers paid tribute to Levvy's contributions and established a school essay competition in her name. The Sydney Morning Herald obituary described her as being remembered for her devoted service to the prevention of cruelty to animals.

Elaine Stratford describes Levvy, as both a product of and ahead of her time. She notes that Levvy was deeply shaped by the progressive, evangelical, and reformist ideals of the 19th century but stood out for her forward-thinking use of journalism as a tool for social change. Stratford identifies Levvy's writing as her principal strength, a means by which she advanced humane education, built networks, and challenged limits on women's public roles. She argues that Levvy recognised the power of print to influence attitudes toward animals and saw children as active agents of social progress rather than passive learners. Her efforts, Stratford concludes, were "quietly radical" for their era, linking compassion, education, and media to achieve lasting change in animal welfare and public ethics.
