= Adam Armstrong =

Adam Armstrong may refer to:

- Bill Armstrong (politician) (Adam Alexander Armstrong, 1909–1982), Australian politician
- Adam Armstrong (footballer) (born 1997), English footballer for Wolverhampton Wanderers F.C.
- Adam Armstrong (rugby union) (1878–1959), New Zealand rugby union player
- Adam Armstrong (settler) (1788–1853), arrived in Swan River Colony in 1829
