= Criterion Hotel =

Criterion Hotel may refer to:

== Australia ==
=== Queensland ===
- Criterion Hotel, Maryborough
- Criterion Hotel, Rockhampton
- Criterion Hotel, Warwick

=== Western Australia ===
- Criterion Hotel, Perth
