= Theophilus Ellis =

British colonial administrator

Government Resident at Kelmscott
- In office September 1831 – 11 November 1834
- Governor: James Stirling
- Preceded by: Office established
- Succeeded by: Office abolished

Superintendent of Native Tribes
- In office 1833 – 11 November 1834
- Preceded by: Office established
- Succeeded by: Office abolished
- Governor: James Stirling

Personal details
- Born: Theophilus Tighe Ellis; 1782 Kingdom of Great Britain
- Died: November 11, 1834 (aged 51–52) Perth, Western Australia

Military service
- Allegiance: British Empire
- Branch/service: British Army
- Rank: Captain
- Unit: 14th Regiment of Dragoons
- Battles/wars: Napoleonic Wars: Peninsular War; Pinjarra massacre

Theophilus Tighe Ellis (1782 – 11 November 1834) was a British colonial administrator who became the first person to become a police officer in Western Australia, and its first police officer to be killed in the line of duty. He was speared while participating in the Pinjarra massacre.

== In the United Kingdom ==
Theophilus Tighe Ellis was born in 1782 to Edward Ellis, who was from Rocklands, Dublin. His family was fairly prominent among the Anglo-Irish gentry and was descended from a soldier who settled in Northern Ireland in the late 1500s. Ellis had two sisters, Charlotte, Mary Jane and Mary Bolger, and one brother, Francis Edward.

During the Napoleonic Wars, he was commissioned as an officer in the British army. Ellis then rose to the rank of captain in the 14th Regiment of Dragoons. During the Napoleonic Wars, he fought in the Peninsular War.

== In Western Australia ==
On 8 May 1830, Ellis arrived in the Swan River Colony on the ship James with his sister Mary Bolger and her nine sons and daughters. Ellis became a settler in newly established town of Kelmscott, south of Perth, and was appointed the government resident at Kelmscott in September. John Atkinson's plan for Kelmscott drawn up in late 1830 named one of the streams after Ellis.

As the government resident in Kelmscott, he personally beat a Noongar elder without trial for theft of poultry. The Noongars avenged the elder in October 1830 by spearing John Randal Phillips, who had previously treated the Noongars with respect.

In December, Ellis wrote to the Colonial Secretary asking for him to raise a unit of the unit of the Yeomanry Cavalry for the Kelmscott/Canning district, which was to consist of him and nine other ex-military veterans. The offer was declined.

In January 1831, Ellis was granted 707 hectares (1,750 acres) in the Avon district. His land in Kelmscott and Avon were auctioned off following his death.

In 1833, he was appointed the Superintendent of Native Tribes. On 15 July 1834, he became the Principal Superintendent of the Mounted Police Corps, making him the first police officer of Western Australia. This came following violence between settlers and the native Noongar people, which placed pressure of Governor Stirling to form an organization to protect settlers.

=== Death ===
During the Pinjarra Massacre against Aboriginal Australian tribes on 28 October 1834, he was speared in the right temple and fell off his horse. His fall caused him to go into a coma, in which he frequently experienced fits of delirium. He died on the morning of 11 November 1834 at his residence near Mount Eliza in Perth. Ellis was buried on 12 November; his funeral was attended by Governor James Stirling and the majority of Perth's population.

The role of Superintendent of Native Tribes was abolished on 29 November.

== Legacy ==
A folk ballad honouring Ellis, The Jackets of Green, was published on 15 November.

On 11 November 2020, the Western Australia Police Union posted on Twitter a post commemorating the 186th anniversary of Ellis' death. Following criticism and accusations of racism, they subsequently deleted the post. The post was also criticised by the Police Commissioner of the Western Australia Police Force, Chris Dawson, who said that the union should focus on the current conditions of workers. Ellis remains a controversial figure due to his involvement in the Pinjarra massacre.
