= Calyute =

Indigenous Australian resistance leader

Calyute (fl. 1833–1840), also known as Kalyute, Galyute or Wongir, was an Indigenous Australian resistance leader who was involved in a number of reprisal attacks with white settlers and members of other tribes in the early days of the Swan River Colony, in Western Australia. He was a member of the Pindjarup people from around the Murray River area south of Perth. Calyute's family included two brothers, Woodan and Yanmar, two wives, Mindup and Yamup, and two sons, Ninia and Monang.

== Biography ==
The arrival of Thomas Peel and his settlement at the mouth of the Murray River had displaced Pinjarup from an important food source, as the effect of white settlement on the Pindjarup lands at that time were considerable. On 24 April 1834, Calyute led a raid of 20 to 30 men and women on Shenton's Mill, in South Perth, where they stole 510 kilograms (1,100 lb) of flour. It is speculated that the increased tensions were related to a dispute a few months earlier between the Pindjarup people and Noongars of the Swan River area. Loss of the white settlers' livestock by the dogs of the Aboriginal people, and the killing of kangaroo by settlers may have also raised tensions between the groups.

Following the raid, and at the prompting of Thomas Peel, who was the major white landholder taking land in the Murray District in which Calyute's people generally lived, a party of soldiers led by Captain Ellis searched for and captured Calyute and two other Pindjarup named Yedong and Monang. All three were seriously injured during the capture, but still brought back to Perth where they were publicly flogged. Calyute received sixty lashes and was then confined to Fremantle Prison until 10 June 1834.

In July, a few weeks after his release from Fremantle, a group including Calyute and Yedong raided Peel's property near Mandurah, killing a young servant of Peel's, Private Hugh Nesbitt and injuring former Sergeant Edward Barron. Although spontaneous incidents had occurred previously, this was the first time that a settler, friendly to the natives, had been lured into the bush and murdered. Calyute's motive was apparently in payback retaliation for his harsh treatment at the hands of authorities in Perth.

Previously, on 1 June 1833, Charles Macfaull, the then editor of the Perth Gazette had written, largely in response to unassociated raids by another Aboriginal leader, Yagan:

Although we have ever been the advocates of a humane and conciliatory line of procedure, this unprovoked attack must not be allowed to pass over without the infliction of the severest chastisement: and we cordially join our brother colonists to the one universal call – for a summary and fearful example. We feel and know from experience that to punish with severity the perpetrators of these atrocities will be found in the end an act of the greatest kindness and humanity.

— Neville Green

=== Pinjarra Massacre ===
Responding to pressure from the increasingly nervous settlers, and against previous efforts in which he had advocated tolerance when dealing with conflicts between the settlers and the natives, Governor James Stirling assembled a party of 25 soldiers and settlers to hunt the perpetrators of the raid on Peel's property. The party included Stirling himself, John Septimus Roe and Thomas Peel.

On 28 October 1834 the armed soldiers ambushed the Pindjarup campsite on the banks of the Murray River, south of the present day town of Pinjarra. Between 60 and 80 Pinjarup people came under fire with the number of dead disputed.

Calyute, Yedong and a number of others avoided capture and escaped towards Lake Clifton.

== Later life ==
Little is known of his later life, but in May 1840 his group attacked a Noongar camp near Perth, spearing five people. There are no other records of Calyute and he is believed to have died at an old age.

== See also ==
- List of Indigenous Australian historical figures

== Sources ==
- Green, Neville (1984). Broken Spears: Aboriginals and Europeans in the southwest of Australia. Cottesloe: Focus Education Services. ISBN 0-9591828-1-0. LCCN 85194823. OCLC 1285471045. OL 2625980M. Wikidata Q136385324.
- Green, Neville (2005). "Calyute (fl. 1833–1840)". Australian Dictionary of Biography. Vol. Supplement. National Centre of Biography, Australian National University. ISBN 978-0-522-84459-7. ISSN 1833-7538. OCLC 70677943.

== General references ==
- Hallam, Sylvia; Tilbrook, Lois (1990). Aborigines of the Southwest Region 1829–1840. Nedlands: University of Western Australia Press. ISBN 0-85564-296-3.
