= Barnett Levey =

Merchant and theatre director in colonial Australia (1798–1837)

Barnet Levey
- Born: 1798; London, Middlesex England
- Died: 2 October 1837 (aged 38–39); Sydney, Australia
- Occupations: Theatre owner, manager and director; auctioneer; banker; publican; merchant
- Children: Frances Deborah Levvy
- Relatives: Solomon Levey (brother)

Barnett Levey (1798 – 2 October 1837) was a Jewish English–Australian merchant and theatre director. Levey was born in London and migrated to Sydney in December 1821 as the first free Jewish settler. From 1826 Levey had joined concerts as a singer. In 1832 he received the first theatre license. In 1833, Levey founded Theatre Royal, Australia's oldest theatrical institution, and has been regarded as the "father of Australian theatre."

Barnett Levey built Waverley House in 1827, the first house in the Waverley district. Following Levey's death, the house served as a convent and subsequently as a school for destitute girls and later as a boys' school before it was demolished in 1904. Waverley House gave its name not only to the Municipality, but also to the Suburb, Street, Crescent and Lane.

Levey was buried in the Jewish section of Devonshire Street cemetery and the headstone was eventually moved to Botany cemetery with all the other stones to make way for the railway.

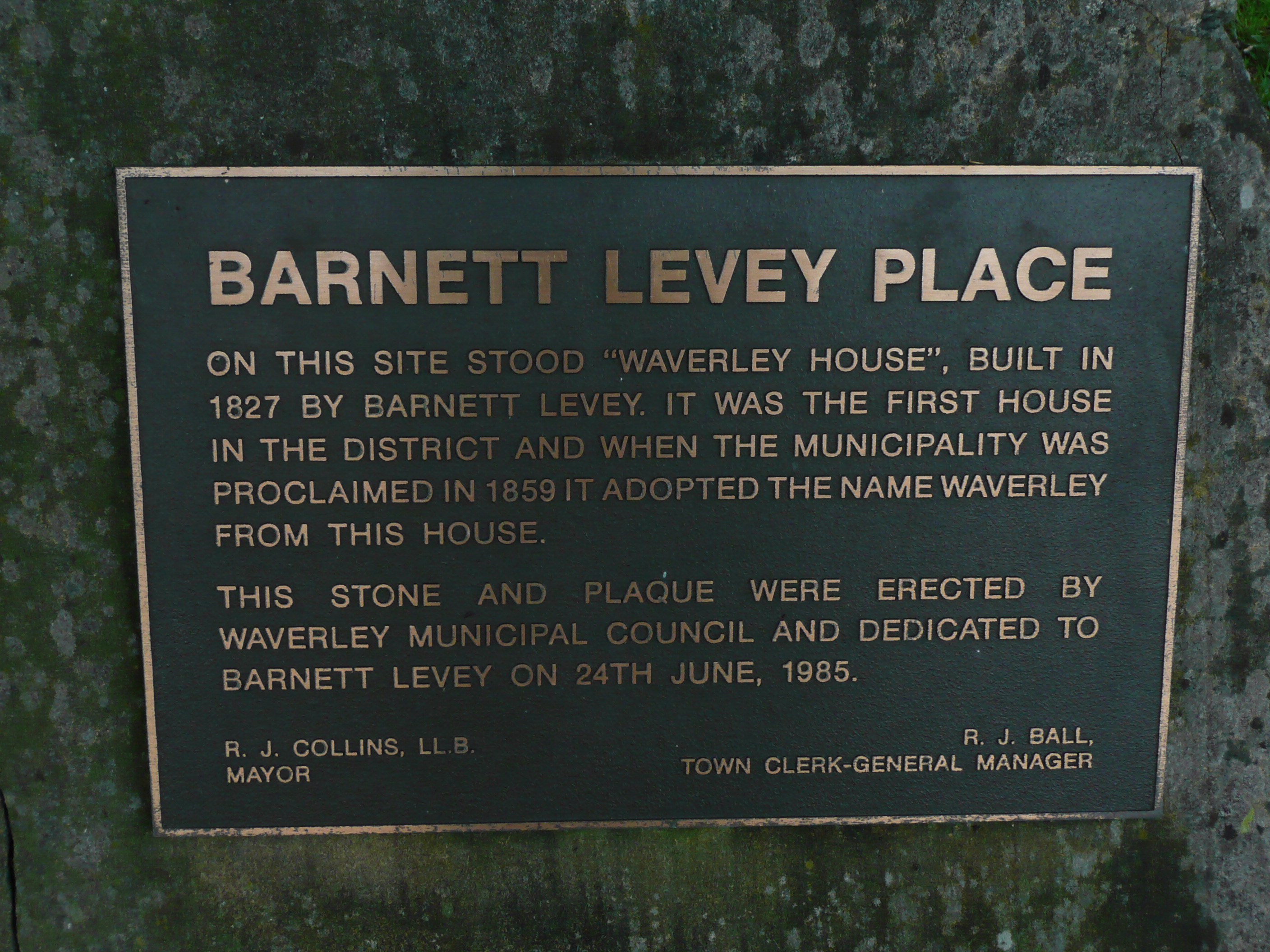
Commemoration plague at the site of Waverley House

== Family ==
Barnett married Sarah Emma Wilson in 1825 and they had four children. Their daughter, Frances Deborah Levvy, was an animal welfare activist. Barnett's brother Solomon Levey was a prosperous merchant.
