= Port Levy =

Coordinates: 43°38′S 172°50′E

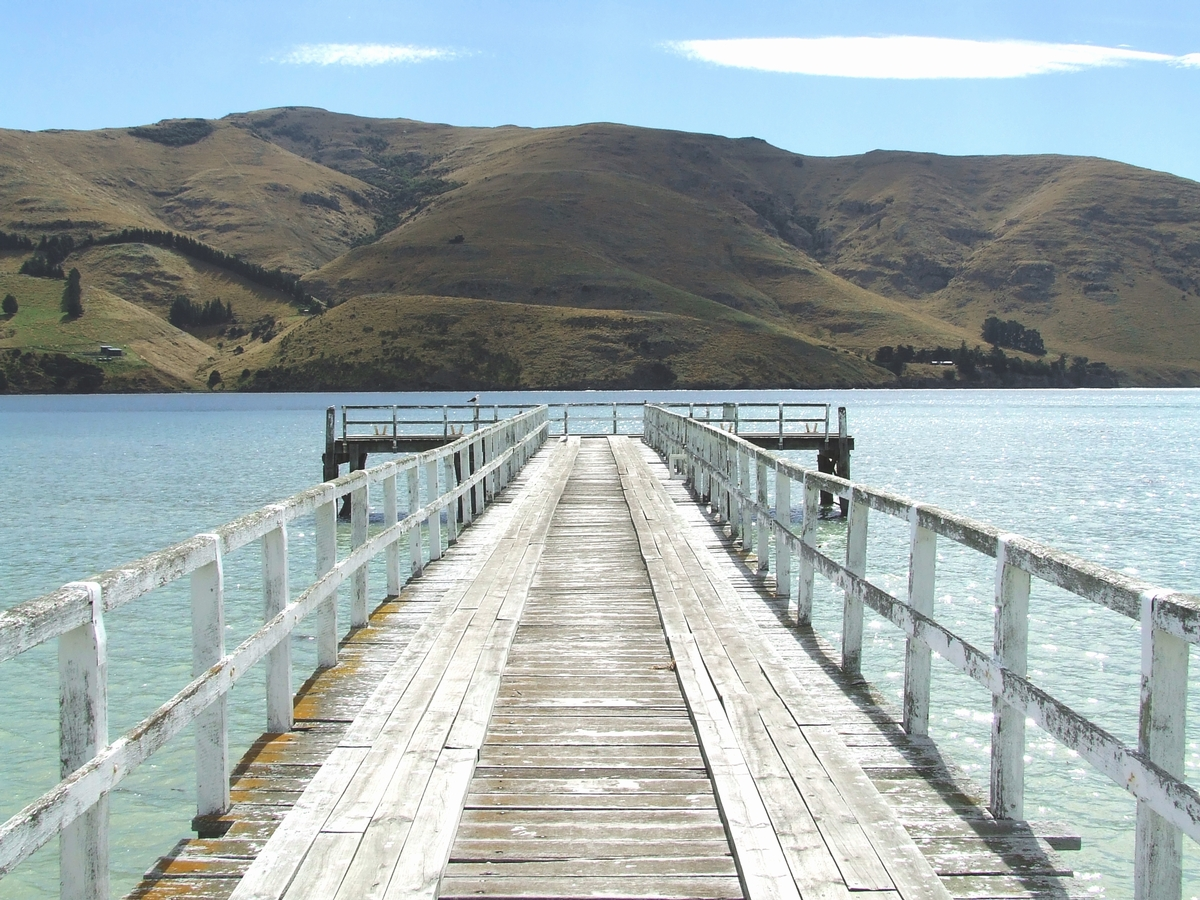
Port Levy Jetty

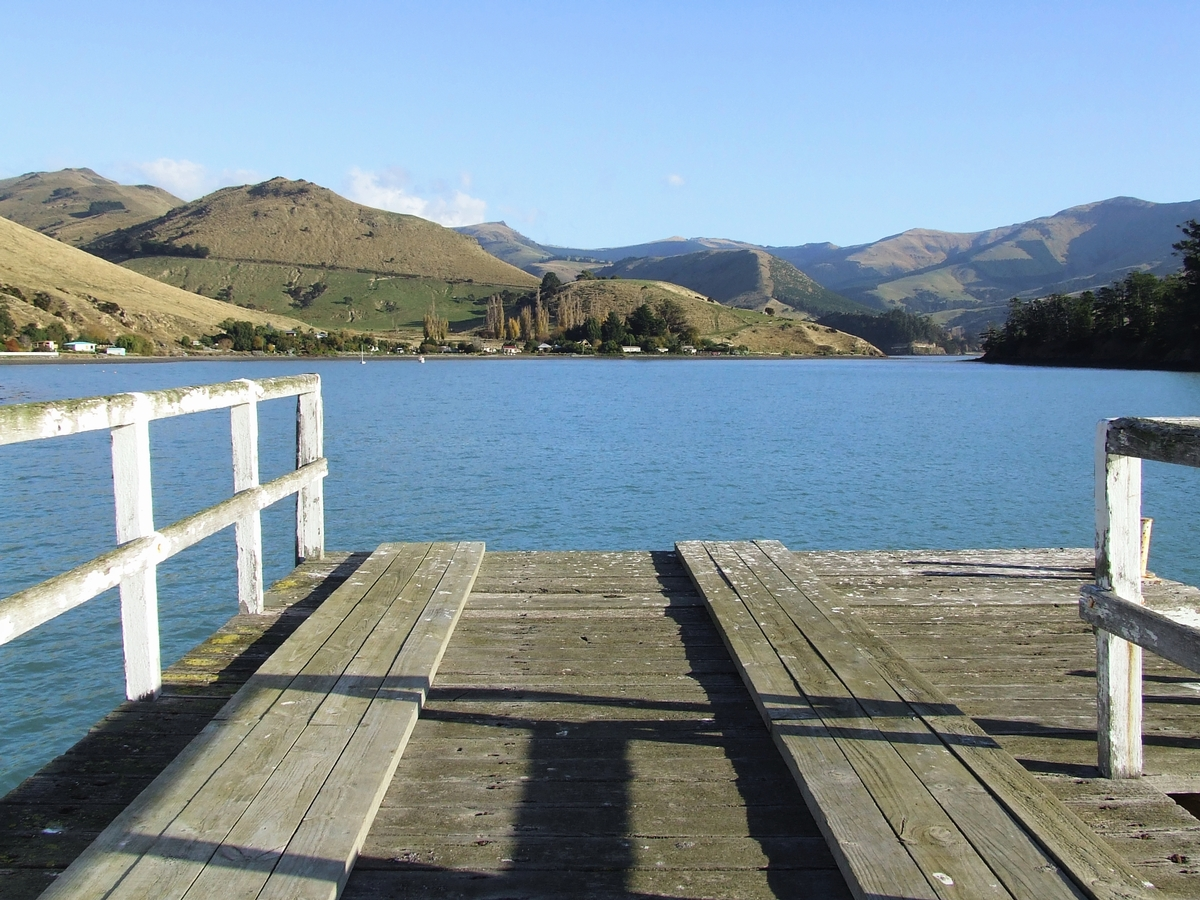
Jetty featured in the 1994 film Heavenly Creatures

Port Levy (Māori: Koukourarata) is a long, sheltered bay and settlement on Banks Peninsula in Canterbury, New Zealand. The current population is under 100, but in the mid-19th century it was the largest Māori settlement in Canterbury with a population of about 400 people. It is named after Solomon Levey, an Australian merchant and ship owner who sent a number of trading vessels to the Banks Peninsula area during the 1820s.

The bay was settled by the Ngai Tūāhuriri sub-tribe of Ngāi Tahu, and the chief Moki named the bay "Koukourarata" after a stream in Wellington that recalls the birth of his father, Tu Ahuriri. It was also the home of Tautahi, the chief after whom the swampland area Ōtautahi was named – now the site of the city of Christchurch.

Koukourarata marae, a marae (tribal meeting ground) of Ngāi Tahu and its Te Rūnanga o Koukourarata branch, is located at Port Levy. It includes the Tūtehuarewa wharenui (meeting house).

The three hapū of Koukourarata are Ngāi Tūhaitara, Ngāi Tūtehuarewa and Ngāti Huikai.

== In popular culture ==
Portions of the Peter Jackson film Heavenly Creatures based on the Parker–Hulme murder case were shot in Port Levy – specifically the scenes where Pauline Parker and Juliet Hulme, two 16-year-old girls from Christchurch, saw their imaginary Fourth World.

== Church ==
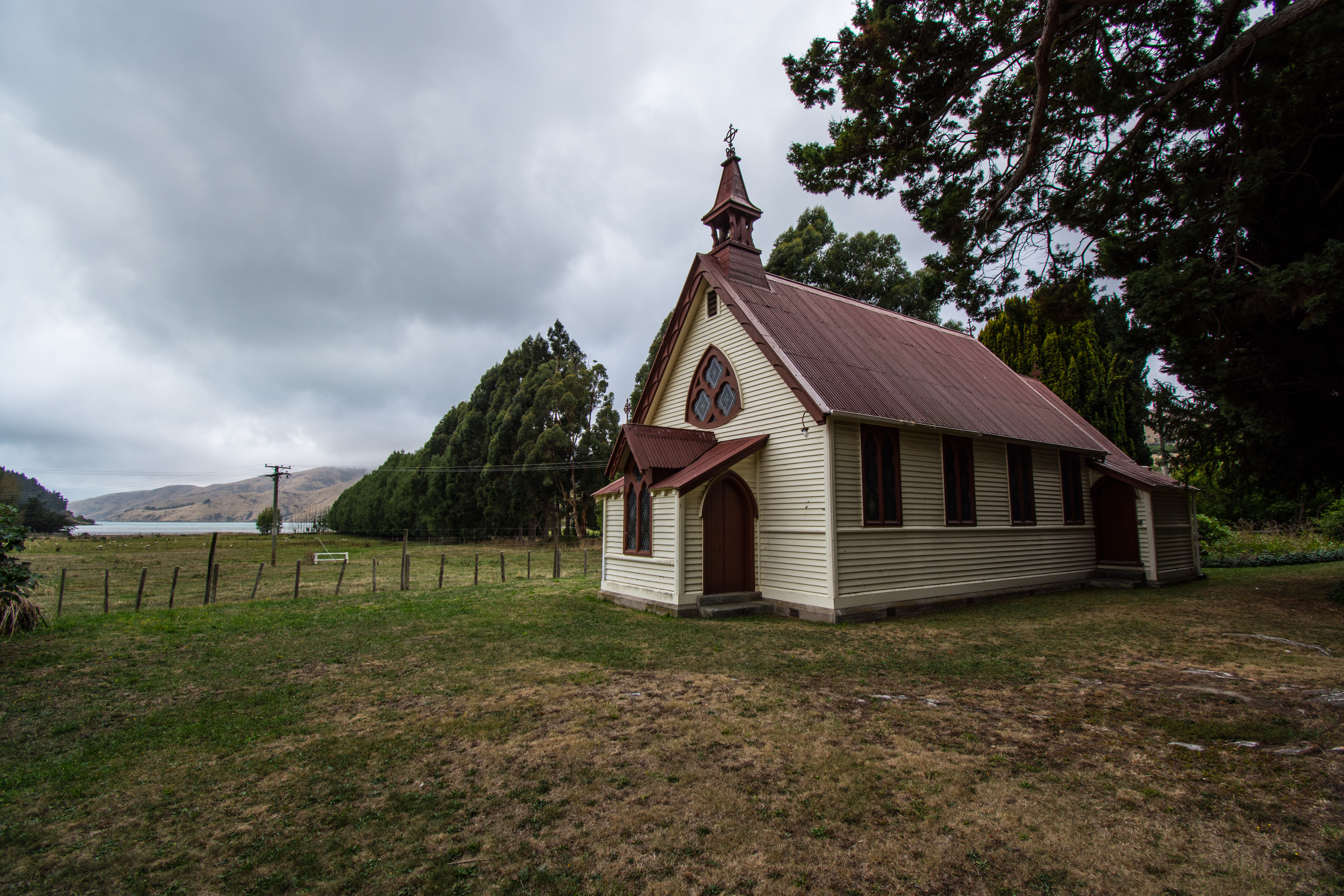
St Paul's Anglican Church, Port Levy

The earliest Anglican church in Canterbury was thought to have been built at Port Levy. This occurred at some time in the 1840s. A stone memorial marks the site. It is inscribed "Te Turanga o te whare karakia tuatahi o te hahi mihinare o Waitaha. On this site stood the first Anglican church in what was to become Canterbury". The current St Paul's Anglican church was built in 1888.
