= Solomon Levey =

Australian convict and merchant

Solomon Levey (c. 1794 – 10 October 1833) was a convict transported to Australia in 1815 for theft who became a highly successful merchant and financier, at one time issuing his own banknotes in New South Wales. Solomon was a backer of the Swan River Colony in Western Australia, and lost a fortune when it failed. He was also a noted philanthropist. He died in London aged 39. Port Levy on Banks Peninsula, Canterbury, New Zealand is named after him.

== Career ==
At age 19, Levey was sentenced in October 1813 at the Central Criminal Court of England and Wales to seven years of transportation for his alleged involvement in the theft of 41 kilograms (90 lb) of tea and a wooden chest. In January 1815, he reached Sydney and quickly became a businessperson. He was exonerated in February 1819 and in the same month he married Ann, whose father was a wealthy landowner. They had two children, a son born in 1819 and a daughter born in 1822 who died in infancy. Levey's wife left him for another lover and died in February 1824; Levey did not remarry.

Levey found success as a shipbroker and reportedly had an annual salary of £60,000 by 1825. Among other things, he owned part of a water mill in Liverpool, ran a rope factory, and had land and livestock in Argyle and Cumberland. After being pardoned in 1819, Levey worked for the Bank of New South Wales, where he pushed for lower interest rates and partnership with English banks. He was also a trustee for the Sydney Public Grammar School. In 1825, he partnered with Daniel Cooper and founded Cooper & Levey which was headquartered at the Waterloo Waterhouse in George Street, Sydnet. The firm had wide-ranging interests, including in the import and export of goods, shipbuilding, wool-trading and whaling. The business had six vessels that made 9 whaling voyages between 1828 and 1836. By 1828, it was among the country's biggest stock-owners; Cooper & Levey eventually owned most of the land in Waterloo, Alexandria, Redfern, Randwick and Neutral Bay.

== Later years and death ==
In December 1829, Levey met Thomas Peel, who convinced him to back the Swan River Colony in Western Australia. Levey became the director of Thomas Peel & Co. in London, although the partnership ultimately crumbled due to Peel's mismanagement. The company's £20,000 capital was entirely provided for by Levey, who even sold the land he owned in Sydney to purchase supplies for Peel and the other Swan River colonists. Levey died in London on 10 October 1833 at age 39, having been sick for some time. He bequeathed £500 to the Sydney College (later the Sydney Grammar School), making him the first benefactor of the University of Sydney. His real estate in New South Wales, which took ten years to liquidate, was worth an estimated £14,332.

== Personal life ==
Levey was Jewish. His success in New South Wales triggered the migration of many relatives. His brother Barnett was the first free Jewish settler. His brother Isaac arrived shortly after Levey's death and was also a successful businessman and philanthropist.
