= Thames (1818 ship) =

1818-1830 British ship

History

United Kingdom
- Name: Thames
- Namesake: River Thames
- Builder: John Blackett, Poplar, London, for own account
- Launched: 1 October 1818
- Fate: Condemned 1830

General characteristics
- Tons burthen: 347, or 366, or 36683/94 (bm)
- Propulsion: Sail
- Complement: 28
- Armament: 4 guns

Thames was launched in 1818 as an East Indiaman, trading with India and Ceylon under a license from the British East India Company (EIC). She made one voyage transporting convicts to Van Diemen's Land. She became leaky and was condemned at Swan River in 1830 as she was sailing to Île de France from having delivered her convicts at Hobart.

== Career ==
Thames first appeared in Lloyd's Register (LR) in 1818 with Letson, master, Blackett, owner, and trade London.

In 1813 the EIC lost its monopoly on the trade between India and Britain. British ships were then free to sail to India or the Indian Ocean under a license from the EIC.

In 1820 LR showed her master as Letson, changing to Sibson, her owner as Blackett, and her trade London-Bombay. The next year her trade changed to London–Madras. A list of licensed ships showed Thames, Litson, master, Blackett, owner, sailing on 26 November 1820 for Madras.

She had made an earlier voyage to India as Thames, Litson, master, had arrived at Gravesend on 21 May 1820 from Bombay. She had sailed from the Cape on 11 March. She had sailed from Gravesend on 24 January 1819. Thames. Letson, master, had arrived at Bombay on 21 June.

She also sailed to Bengal and Penang.

LR reported in its 1825 volume (published in 1824) that her master was still John Litson and her owner was still Blackett. Her trade was London–Ceylon. However, J. Litson died at Colombo on 27 July 1824.

The Register of Shipping (RS) for 1826 showed Thames's master as Cousins, her owner as Blackett, and her trade as London–New South Wales.

Convict transport: Captain William Anderson sailed from London on 31 July 1829 and arrived at Hobart on 21 November. Thames had embarked 160 male convicts and she landed 158, two having died on the voyage.

== Fate ==
Thames sailed from 22 January 1830, bound for Île de France via Swan River. Her cargo consisted of some 1200 sheep, seven heifers, 15,000 bricks, and lumber. On 12 February she developed a leak. By having all hands man the pumps, Thames reached Swan River on 16 February. She was surveyed and on 14 March condemned. On 13 April her agent requested government permission to land her stores at Fremantle to be sold for public auction and to sell the hull. A gale on 22 May drove her on shore.

Four other vessels, the ship Rockingham, the brigs Emily Taylor and James, and the ketch Emily and Ellen were also driven on to the beach. Despite reports to the contrary, Bombay rode out the storm safely.
