= Rockingham (1818 ship) =

History

United Kingdom
- Name: Rockingham
- Owner: 1819: Henry Blanshard; 1824: John Barkworth, Hull
- Builder: Philip Laing, Sunderland
- Launched: 8 April 1818
- Fate: Wrecked May 1830

General characteristics
- Tons burthen: 427, or 42710/94 (bm)
- Length: 109 ft 11 in (33.5 m)
- Beam: 29 ft 7 in (9.0 m)
- Complement: 25 (1831)
- Armament: 4 guns

Rockingham was launched at Sunderland in 1818 and immediately became an East Indiaman, sailing under a license from the British East India Company (EIC). She made one voyage for the EIC. She was wrecked in 1830 while delivering immigrants to Western Australia.

== Career ==
Rockingham first appeared in the 1819 volume of the Register of Shipping with G. Waugh, master, J. Laing, owner, and trade Southampton–India.

Captain G. Vaughn sailed for Fort Saint George on 9 September 1819 under a license from the . Rockingham, Vaughn, master, sailed for Bombay on 26 August 1821. In the beginning of July 1822 Rockingham was east of the Cape of Good Hope, bound from Bengal for Britain, when she saw in the far distance two vessels, one dismasted and the other keeping her company. Rockingham could not ascertain their identities, but believed that the accompanying vessel was a regular ship of the EIC.

=== EIC voyage (1823–1824) ===
Captain Charles Beach sailed from the Downs on 17 June 1823, bound for Bengal and Madras. Rockingham arrived at Calcutta on 27 October. Homeward bound, she was at Diamond Harbour on 4 January 1824. Working her way down the coast, she was at Vizagapatam on 13 January and Madras on 22 January. She reached Point de Galle on 11 February and the Cape of Good Hope on 8 April. From there she reached Saint Helena on 14 May and arrived back at the Downs on 4 July.

Rockingham sailed for Madras on 5 January 1825. Her master was C. Beech, and her owner was Waugh.

Lloyd's Register's volume for 1826 reported that Rockingham had undergone small repairs in 1826, that her master had changed from C. Beech to Fotheringham, and that her owner was Vaughn. Her trade was still London–Calcutta.

The Register of Shipping for 1829 showed Rockingham's master changing from Hornblower, to Morris, to Halliburton. It gave her owner as Barksworth and her trade as London–Madras. It also described her repairs in 1826 as "Large".

=== Emigrant voyage to Australia ===
Rockingham was one of three ships that Thomas Peel had chartered to deliver 400 settlers to the Swan River Colony. The other two vessels were Gilmore and Hooghly.

Gilmore, the first to leave, had arrived on 15 December 1829 in the Swan River Colony with Thomas Peel and 182 settlers in all. Hooghly had arrived at Clarence, off Garden Island, Western Australia on 13 February 1830, bringing 173 settlers to the Swan River Colony.

Rockingham (180 passengers), Halliburton, master, left London in January 1830. Her late departure was due to bad weather and to concerns about the colony as rumours about problems there were starting to circulate.

== Fate ==
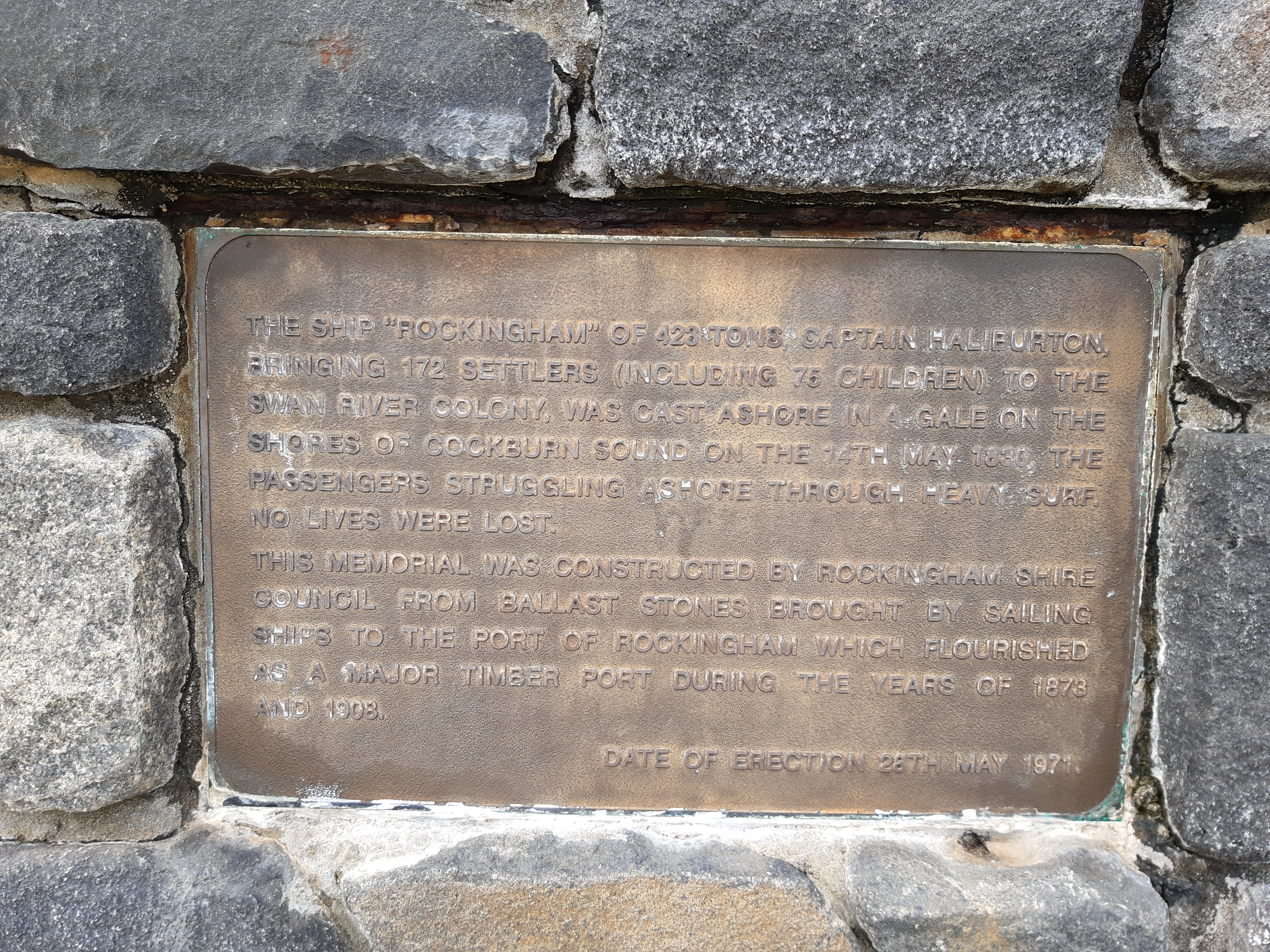
Commemorative plaque for the arrival of the ship "Rockingham" in 1830, unveiled in 1971

Rockingham arrived at Clarence on 14 May 1830. Peel wanted to land her cargo and her settlers so he had a naval officer guide her through the reefs into Cockburn Sound. The settlers were able to land safely through the surf. Rockingham was near the shore when a gale developed on 20 May that lasted for two days and drove her onto the shore. (Note: Four other vessels, the ship Thames, the brigs Emily Taylor and James, and the ketch Emily and Ellen were also driven on to the beach.)

Rockingham was refloated and repaired, but on 21 October a survey condemned her as unseaworthy. She was sold for £900. However, the next day she sailed from Fremantle for Batavia. On the 30th she returned to Fremantle as she had started to leak badly. She was again condemned and sold for breaking up. In April 1831 she sank at her anchors at Garden Island.

A later settlement on the nearby mainland was named for the ship.

Lloyd's Register (1831) showed Rockingham with Fotheringham, master and owner, and trade London–Swan River.
