= South Coogee =

- Suburb
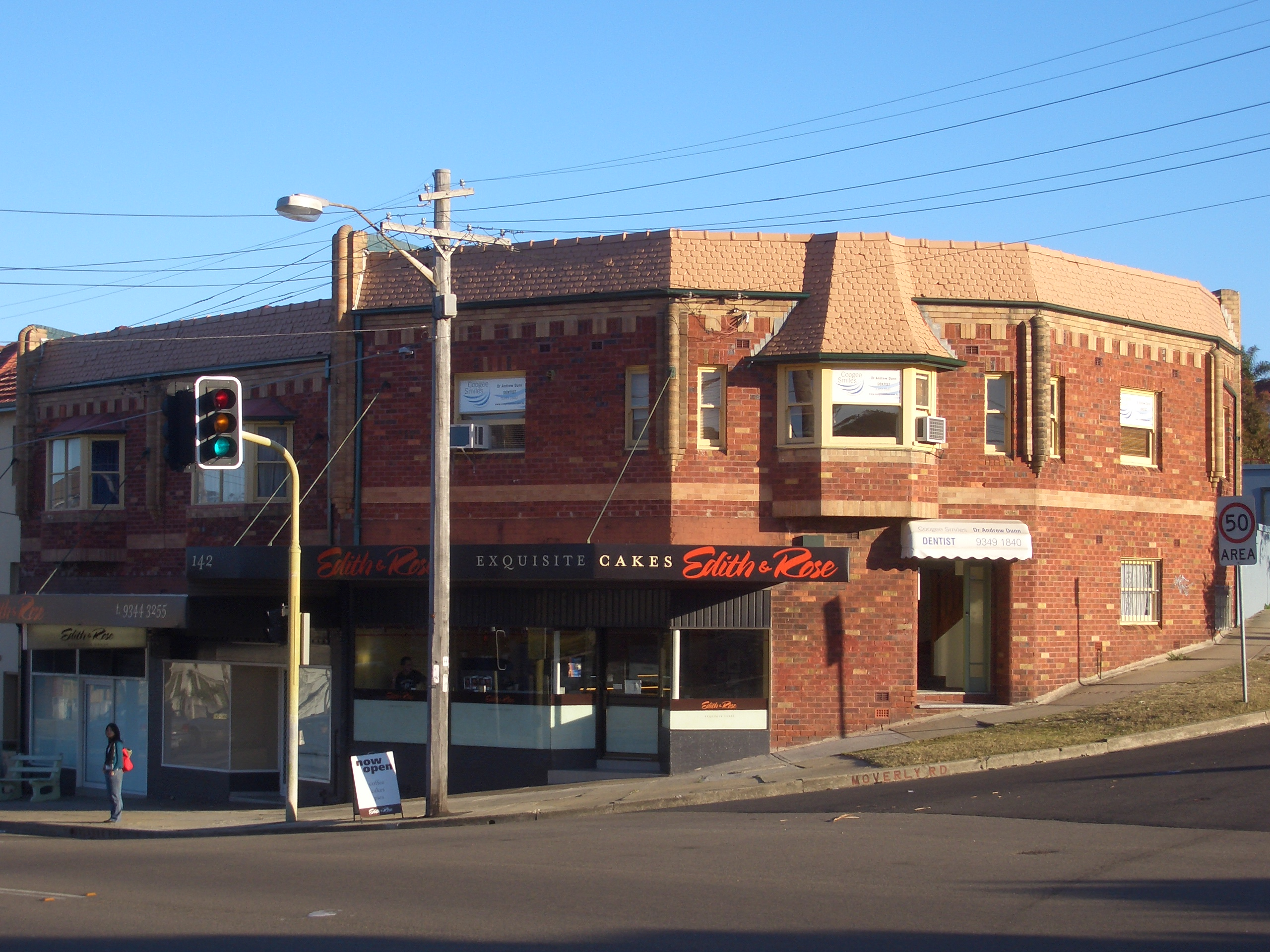
- Shopping strip, Malabar Road

- Interactive map of South Coogee
- Country: Australia
- State: New South Wales
- City: Sydney
- LGA: City of Randwick
- Location: 9 km (5.6 mi) south-east of Sydney CBD

Government
  - State electorate: Coogee
  - Federal division: Kingsford Smith

Population
  - Total: 5,611 (2021 census)
- Postcode: 2034
Suburbs around South Coogee
Charing Cross	Coogee
Randwick	South Coogee	Tasman Sea
Maroubra	Maroubra	Malabar

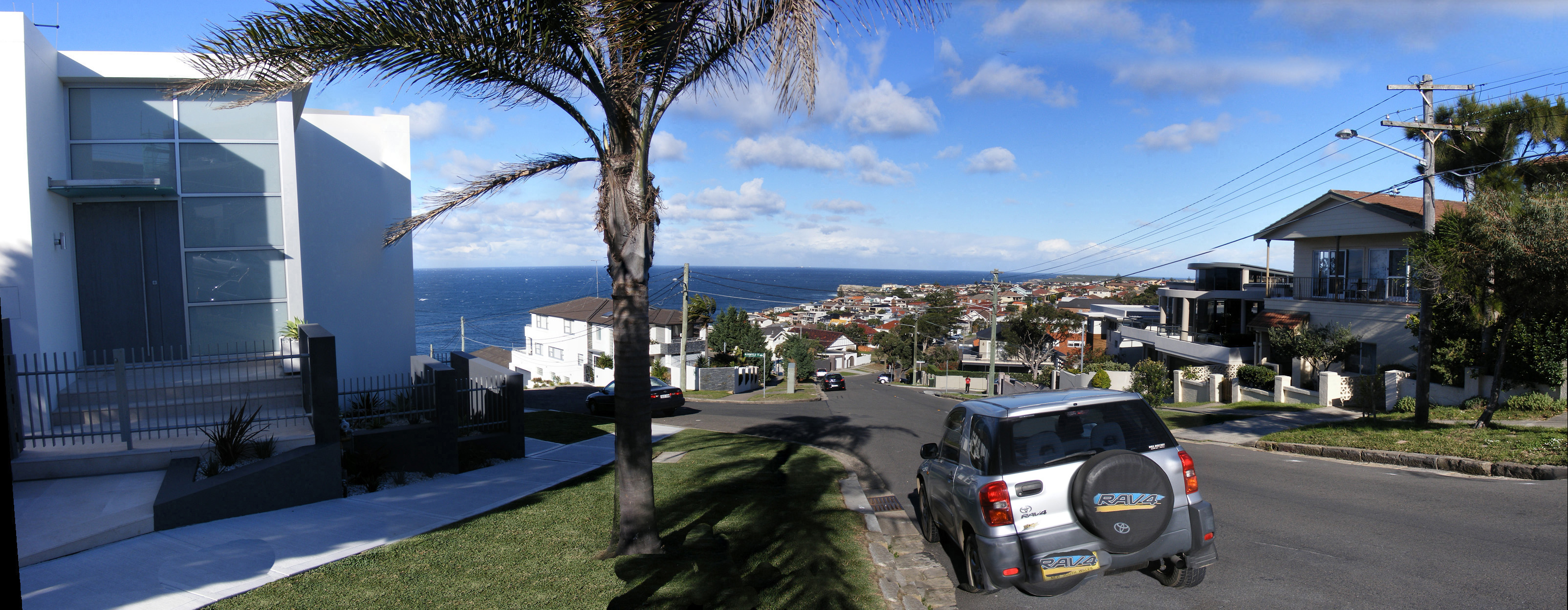
Denning Street

South Coogee is a coastal suburb in the Eastern Suburbs of Sydney, in the state of New South Wales, Australia. South Coogee is located 9 kilometres south-east of the Sydney central business district, in the local government area of the City of Randwick.

Coogee is a separate suburb to the north. South Coogee is surrounded by the suburbs of Coogee, Kingsford and Maroubra.

== History ==
Coogee is said to be taken from a local Aboriginal word koojah which means "smelly place", a reference to the smell of decaying kelp washed up on the beach.

Early visitors to the area, from the 1820s onwards, were never able to confirm exactly what "Coogee" meant, or if it in fact related to Coogee Beach. Another name, "Bobroi", was also recalled as the indigenous name for the locality. Some evidence suggests that the word "Coogee" may in fact be the original Aboriginal place name for the next bay to the north, now known as Gordon's Bay.

Coogee was gazetted as a village in 1838, growing slowly until it was connected to the city by electric tram in 1902.

== Randwick cemetery ==
Until the 1870s, the Randwick Municipality had only one cemetery, which was at St Jude's Church, Avoca Street. In addition, Rookwood Cemetery was also used, but this was too far away. The residents petitioned to have another local cemetery, and in 1872, permission was granted for Randwick Council to acquire land for a second cemetery. Land was bought in what is now the South Coogee area, and the new cemetery, known as Long Bay Cemetery, was ready for use in July 1874. Simeon Henry Pearce, an early Mayor, was appointed manager of the cemetery. Well-known burials include:

- Ernest Broughton, mayor of Ashfield and Member of the New South Wales Legislative Assembly
- the Hannan family, publishers of the Randwick Coogee Weekly
- Frances Deborah Levvy, animal welfare advocate
- Darby Munro, a well-known jockey
- Sir John See, Mayor of Randwick 1880–81 and 1886, and 14th Premier of N.S.W. (1901–1904)
- Charles Henry Streeton, the father of painter Sir Arthur Ernest Streeton
- the Veness family of business people, including Fred Veness, Randwick Postmaster 1864–78

== Population ==
According to the 2021 census of Population, there were 5,611 people in South Coogee.

- Aboriginal and Torres Strait Islander people made up 1.9% of the population.
- 61.6% of people were born in Australia. The next most common countries of birth were England 5.0%, South Africa 2.1% and China 1.8%.
- 71.3% of people spoke only English at home. Other languages spoken at home included Greek 3.5%, Russian 2.9% and Mandarin 2.2%.
- The most common responses for religion were No Religion 31.5% and Catholic 28.2%.

== Schools ==
South Coogee has a primary school, South Coogee Public School.

== Churches ==
- South Coogee Anglican Church

== Transport ==
There are buses running along Malabar Rd and that is the only transport in the area.

- Route 353 – northbound to Bondi Junction via Coogee, southbound to Eastgardens via Maroubra Junction
- Routes 376 and 377 – northbound to City via Randwick Junction, southbound to Maroubra Beach

== Landmarks ==
Latham Park is a large recreation area that features football fields, cricket pitches, tennis courts and bowls greens. It sits beside Endeavour House, a Department of Defence facility for the Royal Australian Navy. A small shopping strip is located in Malabar Road, close to the boundary of Randwick Cemetery. Another strip of shops sits one kilometre further south along Malabar Road at the corner of Torrington Road,

Lurline Bay is a secluded rocky basin located between Coogee and Maroubra Beaches in suburb of South Coogee. Nestled between weather sculptured headlands, the small bay can only be accessed via the coastal walk from either Seaside Parade to the north or Marine Parade if coming from Maroubra Beach.

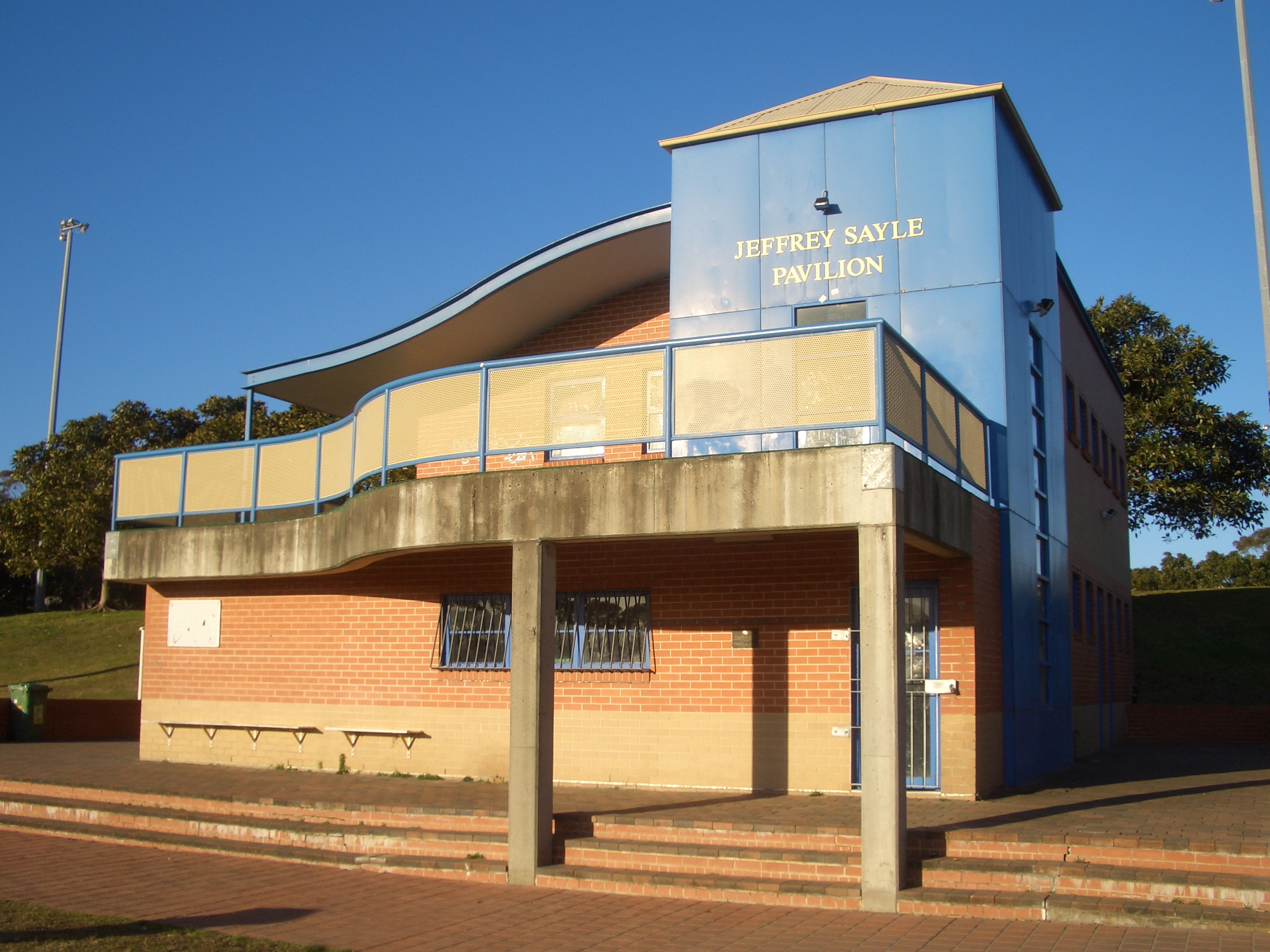
Jeffrey Sayle Pavilion, Latham Park

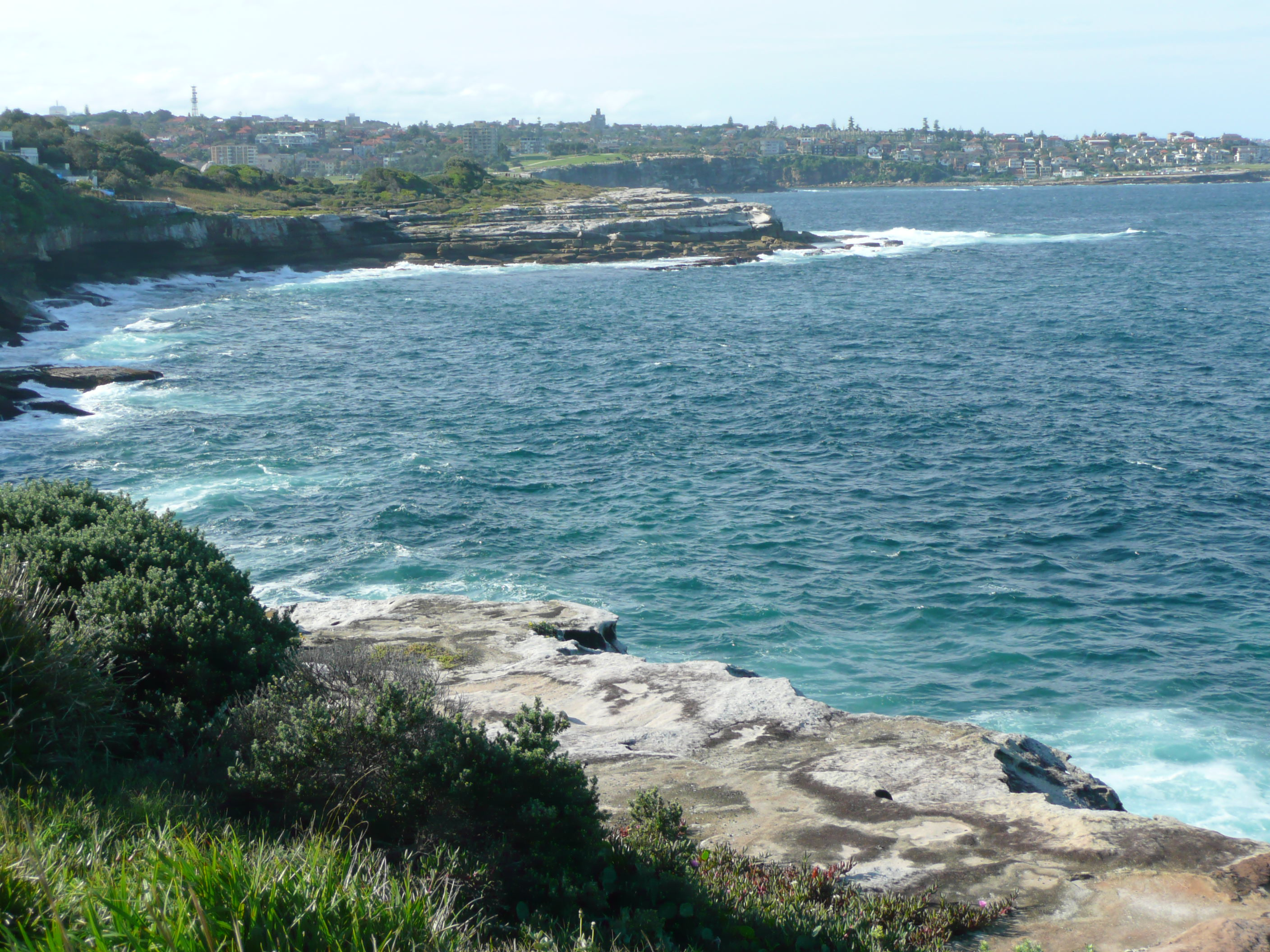
View from Coastal Walk, looking towards Coogee Beach

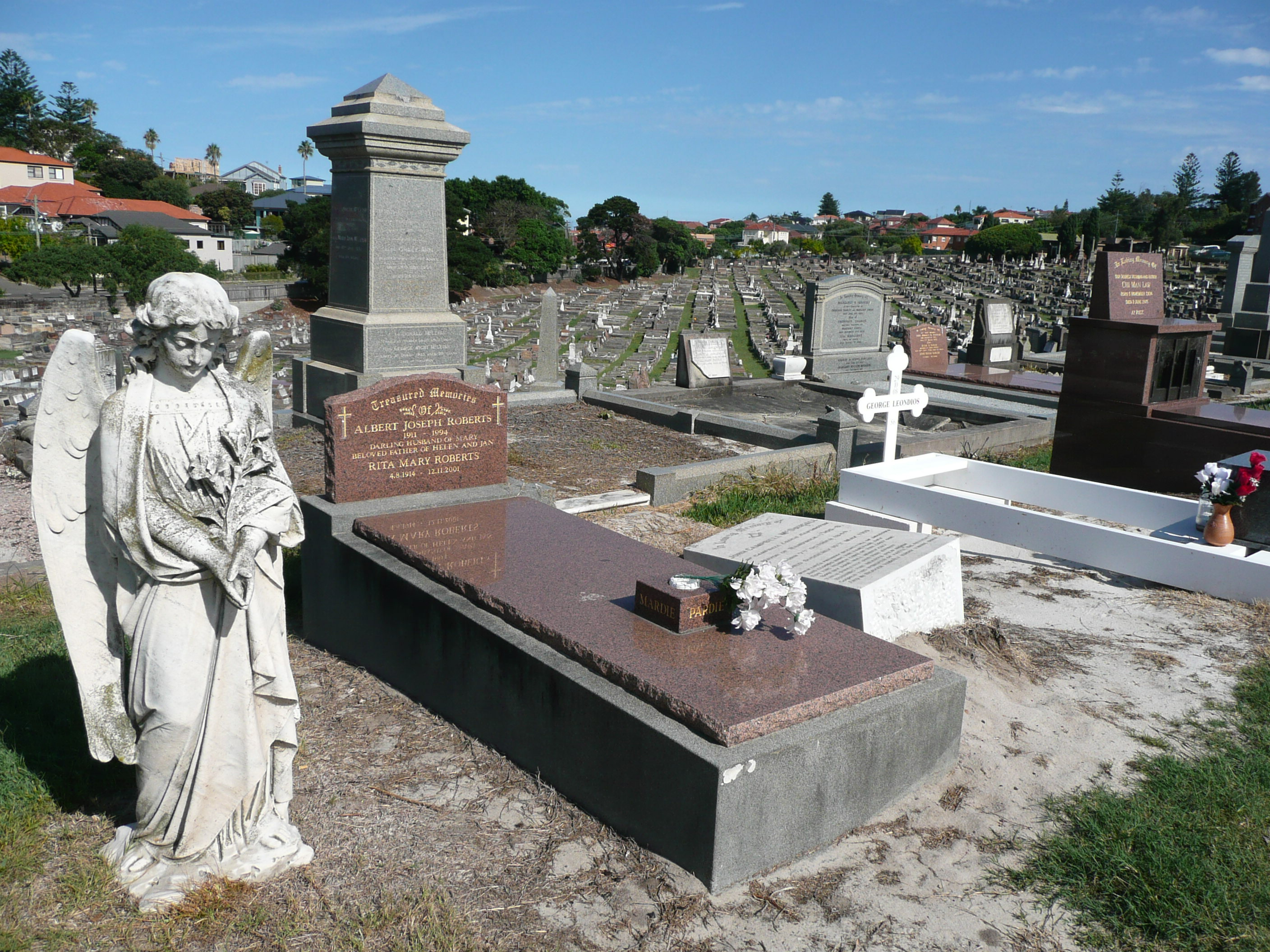
Randwick Cemetery, Malabar Road

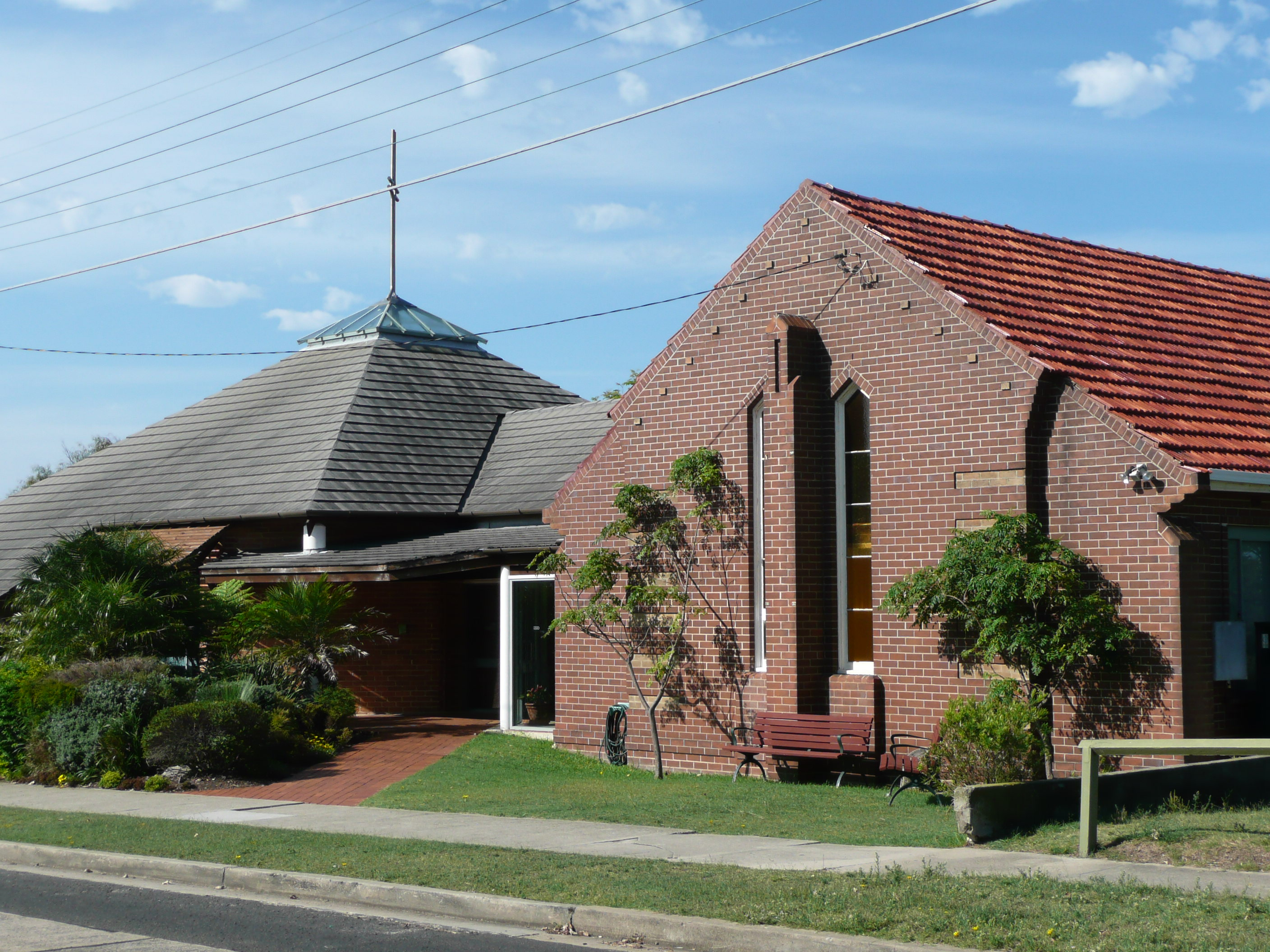
St Paul's Anglican Church, Gregory Street
