= Hooghly (1819 ship) =

History

United Kingdom
- Name: Hooghly, Hoogley, or Hooghley
- Namesake: Hooghly River
- Owner: EIC voyage #1: John W Buckle; EIC voyage #2: 2 Buckle & Co.
- Port of registry: London (Official Number: 13680)
- Builder: Gordon, Deptford
- Launched: 31 March 1819
- Fate: Sank 10 December 1863

General characteristics
- Tons burthen: 442, 466, 480, or 550 (bm)
- Length: 117 ft 3 in (35.7 m) (keel)
- Beam: 29 ft 8 in (9.0 m)
- Propulsion: Sail

Hooghly was a full-rigged merchant ship built on the Thames, England, and launched in 1819. She made two voyages under charter to the British East India Company (EIC), four voyages transporting convicts from England and Ireland to Australia, as well as voyages transporting emigrants to South Australia between 1839 and 1856. Around 1858 she was re-rigged as a barque. She sank off Algiers in 1863.

== Career ==
=== EIC voyage #1 (1819-1820) ===
Captain James Thomas Lamb sailed from the Downs on 27 May 1819, bound for Bengal. Hooghly then reached Calcutta on 23 September. Homeward bound, she passed Kedgeree on 1 January 1820. She then reached the Cape of Good Hope on 3 March and St Helena on 5 April, before arriving back at the Downs on 30 May.

=== Convict voyage #1 (1825) ===
Under the command of Peter Reeves and surgeon Robert Tainsh, she left Cork, Ireland on 5 January 1825, arriving in Sydney, New South Wales on 22 April. She embarked 195 male convicts, of whom two died en route. Hooghly departed Port Jackson on 21 May bound for Bombay.

=== Convict voyage #2 (1827) ===
On her second convict voyage under the command of Peter Reeves and surgeon Alexander Nisbet, she left London, England on 5 November 1827, arriving in Sydney on 24 February 1828. She embarked 99 male convicts, all of whom arrived. Hooghly departed Port Jackson on 4 April, bound for Batavia.

=== Emigrant voyage (1830) ===
Hooghly arrived in Clarence, off Garden Island, Western Australia on 13 February 1830, bringing 173 settlers to the Swan River Colony. She was one of three ships that Thomas Peel had chartered to deliver 400 settlers. The other two vessels were Gilmore and Rockingham.

Gilmore, the first to leave, had arrived on 15 December 1829 in the Swan River Colony with Thomas Peel and 182 settlers in all. Rockingham (180 passengers), arrived in mid-May 1830. She was wrecked shortly after landing her passengers, but all survived.

Hooghly left Perth in March 1830 bound for London via Singapore, with steerage passengers.

=== Convict voyage #3 (1831) ===
Her next convict voyage was under the command of Peter John Reeves and surgeon James Ellis. Hooghly left Cork, Ireland on 24 June 1831 and arrived in Sydney on 27 September. She embarked 184 female convicts and had no convict deaths en route. Hooghly departed Port Jackson on 22 October, bound for China and London. The departing former Governor of New South Wales, Sir Ralph Darling, was a passenger on the vessel.

=== EIC voyage #2 (1832) ===
Captain Reeves and Hooghly left China on 16 January 1832. They reached St Helena on 8 April, and arrived at the Downs on 31 May.

=== Convict voyage #4 (1834) ===
On her fourth convict voyage under the command of George Bayly and surgeon James Rutherford, she left Portsmouth, England on 28 July 1834, arriving in Sydney on 18 November. She disembarked her full complement of 260 male convicts.

=== later voyages ===
Hooghly made numerous voyages to South Australia.

On one voyage she sailed from London on 19 February 1839 and arrived at Port Adelaide on 17 June. There she landed 290 migrants.

On her next voyage she left Plymouth and arrived at Port Adelaide on 25 July 1840.

In 1842 she sailed from Calcutta to Van Diemen's Land with prisoners and a cargo of horses.

She made five voyages bringing immigrants to Port Adelaide between 1846 and 1859.

1st voyage: She sailed from London on 19 June 1846 and arrived on 23 October.

2nd voyage: She sailed from London on 3 August 1847 and arrived on 22 November.

3rd voyage: She sailed from London on 13 August 1848 and arrived on 4 December.

4th voyage: She sailed from Plymouth on 2 January 1855 and arrived on 18 April.

5th voyage: She sailed from Plymouth on 12 April 1856 and arrived on 26 July.

In 1859 Hooghly left London on 10 September and arrived in Hobart on 21 December. She transported 131 immigrants, including many single women.

At some point Hooghly also sailed from Cork, Ireland to Port Jackson, New South Wales, with Irish migrants.

== Fate ==
Hooghly foundered off Algiers on 10 December 1863 while on a voyage to Cork, Ireland, from Constantinople. After the crew safely abandoned her the British steamship Ida rescued them, landing them at Gibraltar five days later.
