= Clarence, Western Australia =

Early European settlement on the coast of Western Australia

Designations

Western Australia Heritage Register
- Official name: Peel Town Archaeological Sites
- Designated: 8 December 2022
- Reference no.: 17868

Clarence, also known as Clarence Town and Peel Town, was an early European settlement on the coast of Western Australia. It was planned by Thomas Peel, with help from various other colonial backers. The first ship of settlers landed in December 1829, and the settlement was abandoned by the early 1830s.

No firm evidence exists for its exact location. It was thought to be sited in the vicinity of Woodman Point, though recent archaeological discoveries have also found evidence of settlement further south, near Mount Brown (32.1817°S 115.7833°E) in the Beeliar Regional Park. The name was chosen in honour of the Duke of Clarence, the heir to the throne at the time of naming.

== General references ==
- "Peel Town Archaeological Sites". Heritage Council (Western Australia).
- "Clarence Township Memorial".
- "Cockburn History – Clarence Townsite: Have you ever wondered about the origins of WA Day?". Cockburn Libraries. 1 June 2016.
