= Francis Armstrong (missionary) =

Scottish Methodist missionary (1813–1897)

Francis Fraser Armstrong (22 November 1813 – 22 May 1897) was a Scottish Methodist pioneer of the Swan River Colony who befriended, and recorded the language of, the Nyungar people in Western Australia. His father Adam Armstrong was a well known early settler of Western Australia.

== Biography ==
Armstrong was born on 22 November 1813 in Scotland, at the town of Dalkeith, from where his father and siblings emigrated in 1829. They travelled to the colony in Western Australia, disembarking at Fremantle and settling on the Swan River at a district that came to be known as the suburb of Dalkeith, Western Australia. Armstrong joined with the Methodists who settled at Tranby House and was active in the founding of a society. He was superintendent of a Christian mission established for the displaced inhabitants at the Perth Water foreshore near Mount Eliza. His appointment to the mission brought him into closer contact with Nyungar peoples, where he assimilated the language and published texts on some dialectal variants. He was appointed by the administration of the colony to the role of interpreter in December 1834.

Armstrong made collections of birds that were amongst the earliest contributions to the ornithology of the state. The botanist Alex George noted his work in obtaining and preserving plants and animals for sale, but states he is not recorded as the collector of taxonomic specimens. The ornithologists Dominic Serventy and Hubert Whittell assume that Armstrong was advised and aided in obtaining birds by his Nyungar friends and associates, and later encounters with the professional field workers John Gilbert and Ludwig Preiss. He recorded in a letter that his spare time was focused on birds, and had advertised his services and collections of prepared specimens for sale.

He died at Perth on 22 May 1897. A window at the Wesley Church commemorates his contributions. A text published in 1836 was reissued in 1979 as part of a collection on Nyungar people.

== General references ==
- Ronald E Turner, Foundations Not Made with Hands (Perth, 1984);
- Wesley Lutton, The Wesley Story (Perth, 1970);
- Thomas Farmer, Journal (Battye Library);
- William McNair, 'Righteousness Developed into Intelligent Goodness' (Western Methodist, Sept 1965);
- William McNair and Hilary Rumley, Pioneer Aboriginal Mission (Perth, 1981)
