= Pindjarup =

Indigenous people of Western Australia

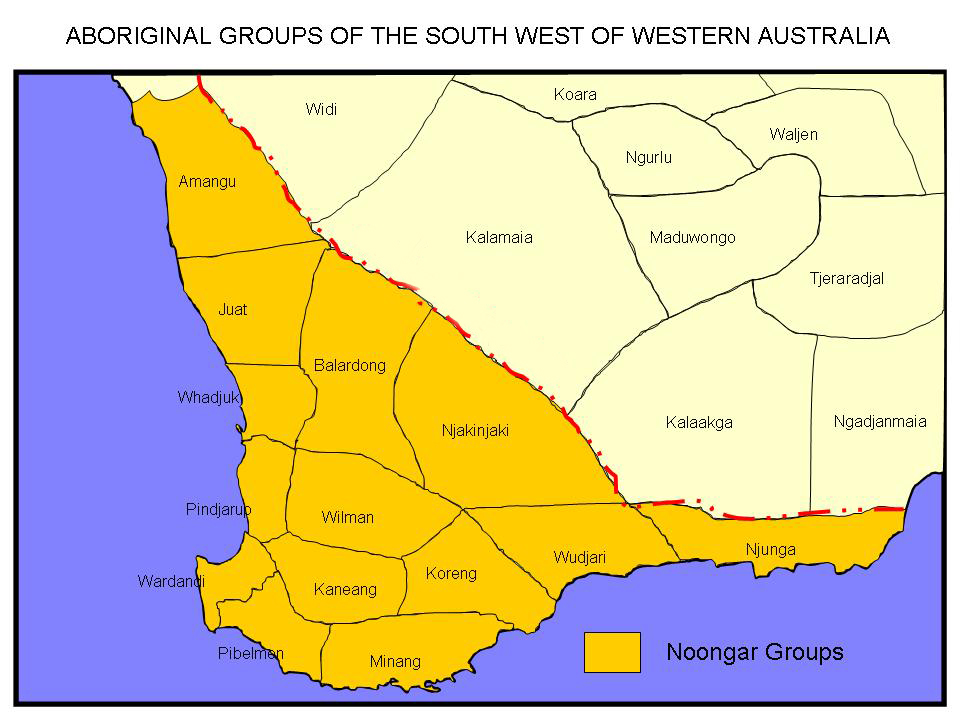
Noongar language groups

The Bindjareb, Binjareb, Pindjarup or Pinjareb are an Indigenous Noongar people that occupy part of the South West of Western Australia.

== Name ==
It is not clear if Pindjarup is the historically correct ethnonym for the tribe. After their disappearance, the only sources for them came from Kaneang informants. The word itself may reflect a lexeme pinjar/benjar meaning wetlands or swamps, which would yield the idea that the Pindjarup were "people of the wetlands".

== Country ==
Pindjarup tribal estates extended over an estimated 4,700 square kilometres (1,800 mi^{2}), taking in Pinjarra, Harvey and the Leschenault Estuary. They were also present on Murray River's lower reaches.

== Social organization and lifestyle ==
As a people of the wetlands, the Pindjarup were famed for their fish-traps, and a seasonal cycle of six seasons, making full use of the environmental resources from the coastal estuaries and sand-dunes, through the interior lakes and wetlands to the more fertile soils of the Darling Scarp foothills and ridgelines. Western long-necked tortoises, black swans, ducks, and migratory birds formed an important part of their diet.

== History of European settlement ==
The lands of the Pindjarup were first explored by Europeans in 1829, when Lieutenant P. N. Preston and Alexander Collie took the Royal Navy vessel HMS Sulphur to explore the mouths of the Peel Inlet, the Serpentine and Murray Rivers, and the Leschenault Inlet. The Pindjarup killed one of the exploration party, George MacKenzie, a 19-year-old, in 1830. Two years later, after a soldier was wounded on the Murray River, Frederick Irwin sent a punitive expedition which killed five Pindjarup and wounded several others.

Thomas Peel, a second cousin of the future British Prime Minister, Robert Peel, was granted some 100,000 hectares (250,000 acres) of land, part of it covering Pindjarup territory, as his personal domain. The Pindjarup were in dispute also with the Whadjuk of the Swan River. In December 1833 the former's claim to have rights to perform their ceremonies and make kinship visits to the northern area were recognised at a corroboree and the Pindjarup resumed their visits to kin. The Whadjuk themselves had had numerous conflicts with encroaching white settlers, who had occupied land on which one of their basic foods, yams, grew. The colonial authorities themselves were drawn into taking sides when intertribal conflicts arose. Around February of the following year clashes took place with settlers after their clan dingoes attacked livestock near Perth. In a standoff, the Pindjarup leader Calyute distinguished himself by keeping his spear pressed to a soldier who had, in turn, held his musket at Calyute's chest. The Whadjuk, who had come to some terms of agreement over co-existence with the intruders, and the Pindjarup fell out with regard to the way to handle the settlers, especially after a duel between Calyte and a Whadjuk man, Yaloo, in which both suffered wounds.

In April 1834 Calyute raided George Shenton's windmill, pinned its owner down after luring him out with an offer of baked damper, and hauled off a substantial quantity, 444 kilograms (979 lb), of flour. His identity and that of many others in the raiding band, was passed on to the settler authorities by Whadjuk people. A detachment managed to capture Calyute, who was bayoneted, together with two other men, Yedong and Monang, some days later, and he was flogged with 60 lashes in Perth's main street, and then imprisoned for a year, being released on 10 June 1834. (Note: Connor gives a different account: "The immediate British response to the flour-mill raid was to send a detachment of troops to the Murray under cover of darkness, which arrested the Pinjarup leader Calyute and some other Puinjarup men for the raids. After the detachment's return to Perth, two of the Pinjarup who were in their late teens, Yeydong and Gummol, were flogged; another man, Wamba, was immediately pardoned; Calyute was held for about six weeks, however, before he was released.")

On Yedong's release he organised an ambush on the 24 July on what Peel regarded as his property, killing a private, Hugh Nesbit and wounding a former soldier, having lured them into a trap after promising them help in retrieving a lost horse. Nesbit's death was attributed to a man called Noonar. The wounded man managed, though speared three times, to make his way back to safety. The military unit at Governor Stirling's disposition had received reinforcements that doubled their numbers by September 1833 and he also created a Mounted Police unit, mainly from discharged soldiers. On 25 October, Stirling led troops, and accompanied by Peel, down into Pindjarup lands, not only to exact retribution for Nesbit's death, but also to enable Peel to resume developing, unthreatened, the Pindjarup lands the Crown had bestowed on him.

=== Pinjarra massacre ===
What ensued was almost immediately referred to as the "Battle of Pinjarra", (Note: The Western Australian advocate-general George Moore coined the phrase in a diary entry immediately afterwards, 1 November 1834.) a name retained by historical memory in Western Australia until recently. Historians now consider it to have been a massacre of the Indigenous people. Stirling's military contingent consisted of 25 men who came across a Pindjarup camp of from 70 to 80 people. Tactics had some positioned on either side of the river and others advancing on an 800-metre (2,600 ft) front, with a forward party pressing on horseback into the camp. At least five Pindjarup were shot dead immediately, and the rest fled riverwards as they were continuously fired upon by Stirling's party. One soldier was speared in the arm, and Captain Ellis, the Superintendent of the Mounted Police, was mortally wounded during the massacre. Stirling's official report stated that 14 Pindjarup had been killed, though modern estimates run as high as 50.

== Events after 1834 ==
By 1836 a permanent military settlement was established in Pinjarra, and further land grants to settlers occurred with little overt resistance from Aboriginal people, who sought employment in the pastoral industry which was established in the area. By 1838 a road through Pindjarup lands connected Pinjarra to Bunbury.

Pindjarup people survived the conflict, but their cultural identity was weakened through policies of successive Protectors of Aborigines in Western Australia, particularly Henry Prinsep and A. O. Neville, who sought to "breed out" the Aboriginal race through miscegenation with whites. Successive outbreaks of measles and other illnesses also took their toll on the successive demoralisation of these people. Nevertheless, since the 1930s the number of Aboriginal people in Pindjarup lands has increased, though most now identify themselves by the language group Noongar, rather than Pindjarup.

From the 1940s to the 1970s up to 500 Aboriginal people, including many of Pindjarup heritage, were incarcerated at the Roelands Aboriginal Mission, most of whom were taken from their families as a part of the Stolen Generations policies of that era.

== Alternative names ==
- Pinjarra (toponym)
- Penjarra
- Pidjain
- Peejine
- Murray tribe
- South West tribe
- Banyowla
- Bangoula (personal name)
- Banyoula
- Kuriwongi (language name)
- Yaberoo ("northerners" applied to people around Wonnerup)

== See also ==
- List of massacres of Indigenous Australians
- List of Indigenous Australian group names

== General references ==
- Horton, David R. (1996), The AIATSIS Map of Indigenous Australia, Australian Institute of Aboriginal and Torres Strait Islander Studies, Wikidata Q134423353
- Napier, Charles James (1835). Colonization, Particularly in Southern Australia: With Some Remarks on Small Farms and Over Population. T. & W. Boone.
- Tilbrook, Lois (1983). Nyungar Tradition: Glimpses of Aborigines of South-Western Australia 1829–1914 (PDF). Nedlands: UWA Publishing. ISBN 978-0-85564-183-2. LCCN 83161415. OCLC 10457913. OL 3245454M. Wikidata Q136511559.
- "Tindale Tribal Boundaries" (PDF). Department of Aboriginal Affairs, Western Australia. September 2016. Archived from the original (PDF) on 8 March 2016.

== Sources ==
- Collard, Len; Palmer, Dave (1996). Nidja Boodjar Binjarup Nyungar, Kura, Yeye, Boorda (Report). Fremantle: Gcalyut Research and Training Project. doi:10.13140/RG.2.1.3593.0485.
- Connor, John (2005) [2002]. The Australian Frontier Wars, 1788-1838. University of New South Wales Press. ISBN 978-0-868-40756-2.
- Green, Neville (2005). "Calyute (fl. 1833–1840)". Australian Dictionary of Biography. Vol. Supplement. National Centre of Biography, Australian National University. ISBN 978-0-522-84459-7. ISSN 1833-7538. OCLC 70677943.
- Tindale, Norman Barnett (1974). "Pindjarup (WA)". Aboriginal Tribes of Australia: Their Terrain, Environmental Controls, Distribution, Limits, and Proper Names. Australian National University. ISBN 978-0-708-10741-6. Archived from the original on 20 March 2020.
