= Criterion Hotel, Perth =

Heritage listed hotel in Perth, Western Australia

Criterion Hotel
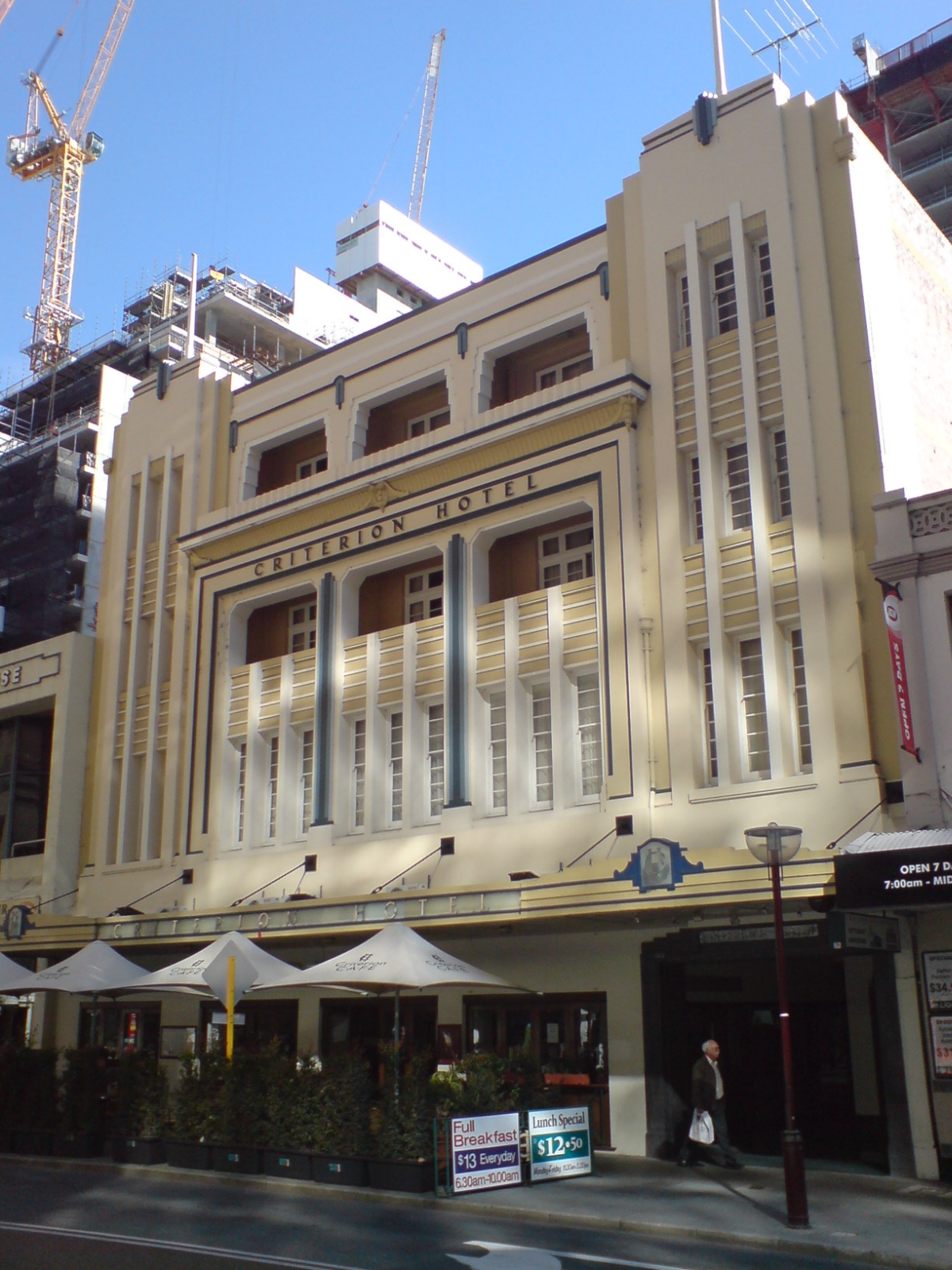
- Interactive map of the Criterion Hotel area
- Former names: Regatta Hotel

General information
- Type: Hotel
- Architectural style: Art Deco
- Location: Perth, Australia
- Coordinates: 31.9550°S 115.8617°E

Website
- www.criterion-hotel-perth.com.au

Western Australia Heritage Register
- Type: State Registered Place
- Designated: 4 August 1998
- Reference no.: 1989

The Criterion Hotel, formerly the Regatta Hotel, is a hotel in Perth, Western Australia. It is the only remaining Art Deco hotel in the Perth central business district.

== Heritage listing ==
The hotel was entered on the Western Australian Register of Heritage Places in 1996.
