= Charles Fraser (botanist) =

Australian botanist and explorer (1788–1831)

Charles Fraser or Frazer or Frazier (1788 – 22 December 1831) was Colonial Botanist of New South Wales from 1821 to 1831. He collected and catalogued numerous Australian plant species, and participated in a number of exploring expeditions. He was a member of the Stirling expedition of 1827, and his report on the quality of the soil was instrumental in the decision to establish the Swan River Colony.

== Early life and army career ==
Charles Fraser was born in Blair Atholl, Perthshire, Scotland in 1788. He worked as a gardener, probably for the extensive estates of the landlord, the Duke of Atholl, and subsequently had connections with the botanic gardens of Edinburgh and Glasgow. He enlisted as a soldier in the 56th Regiment on 8 June 1815, and served in the East Indies before arriving in Sydney on board the convict ship Guildford on 8 April 1816. There, his skills as a horticulturalist were recognised, and he was appointed superintendent of the Royal Botanic Gardens, a position that he would hold until his death. In November 1816, Fraser was transferred to the 46th Regiment. He again transferred regiments in August 1817, this time to the 48th Regiment of Foot. On 6 January 1821, Fraser was discharged from the army and formally appointed Colonial Botanist, a position that he had been holding informally at least since 1819. Over the subsequent decade, he organised the development of Sydney Botanic Gardens from the governors’ kitchen garden to a world-renowned botanic garden, receiving and sending plants and seeds to all the major horticultural centres as well as to penal settlements and major gardens in New South Wales.

== Explorations ==
From 1817, Fraser travelled extensively as a field collector. He was a member of three of John Oxley's expeditions: his 1817 expedition to the Lachlan River and Bathurst, his 1818 expedition into north-eastern New South Wales, and his 1819 expedition in the areas of Port Macquarie and Hastings River. He visited Tasmania in 1820, and in 1826 visited Tasmania, New Zealand and Norfolk Island.

=== Swan River expedition ===
Early in 1827 Fraser was appointed to accompany Captain (later Admiral Sir) James Stirling on the Swan River expedition of 1827, an expedition to explore the Swan River on the west coast of Australia, and assess its suitability as a site for a new British settlement. The expedition arrived in the area on board HMS Success on 4 March. After surveying the coastal waters off the Swan, Stirling and Fraser briefly reconnoitred the lower reaches of the River on the 7th. The following day, Stirling led a party of 18 men in two boats, in exploring up the Swan River. With Stirling and Frederick Garling, Fraser climbed Mount Eliza, becoming the first Europeans to do so. At the present-day site of Perth, Stirling named a feature near Heirisson Island Point Fraser in Fraser's honour, and about a mile upstream Fraser discovered a fresh water brook and lagoon that were named Clause's Brook and Clause's Lagoon respectively, in honour of fellow explorer Frederick Clause. The party camped at Clause's Brook, and the following morning three Noongars approached Fraser while he was alone in the camp, angrily gesturing for him to leave.

By 14 March the party had traced the Swan River to its junction with Ellen Brook, where the boats could go no further. Stirling then split the party into three groups, each to explore in a different direction. Fraser's group was sent in an eastward direction, where they discovered "many curious and interesting Botanical specimens and a lump of granite from the ridge". Each group having returned to the junction of the Swan with Ellen Brook, the party returned down the Swan River, arriving back at the ship on the 18th.

At the conclusion of the expedition, Fraser wrote a glowing report of the quality of the soil in the area. The report, which Statham-Drew has described as "euphoric", states: "In giving my opinion of the Land seen on the Banks of Swan River, I hesitate not in pronouncing it superior to any I ever saw in New South Wales east of the Blue Mountains...." Together with Stirling's effusive report on the naval, strategic and geological qualities of the area, the reports were instrumental in convincing the British Colonial Office to establish the Swan River Colony, and provided impetus to the period of excessively favorable publicity that has been labelled "Swan River mania".

In reality the soils of the area are quite poor, and Fraser would later be heavily criticised for the inaccuracy of his report. Analyses of the expedition reports has shown that the party explored only within the narrow strip of rich alluvial soil that occurs near the Swan River, and thus they were unaware of the infertile grey sand that constitutes most of the sand plain. It has also been argued that Fraser's assessment of the fertility of the soil would have been influenced by the greenness and apparent health of the native plants, a method that would have had some validity in England, but has little validity in Australia where the vast majority of plants are adapted to dry, infertile soils. Finally, Appleyard (1979) speculates that "the question must be asked: had the persuasive Stirling unduly influenced - not maliciously but seductively by his boundless enthusiasm - Charles Fraser to pen words that did little credit to his professional and administrative standing?"

Fraser was to bear most of the blame with the Swan River colonists for the misinformation that they received. In a thinly veiled attack on Fraser, Eliza Shaw wrote "that man who reported this land to be good deserves hanging nine times over". A naval officer stationed at the Swan River wrote that Fraser's report was so "highly coloured" that it was inevitable that people coming to the colony would be disappointed. John Morgan indirectly criticised Fraser with his comment that botanists are no more capable of assessing land for farming purposes than farmers are capable of discussing "the merits and character of an extraordinary shrub". Finally, in December 1832, Robert Lyon wrote of the "unpardonable sin of Fraser": that he did not state the extent of good land in the area.

=== Later expeditions ===
In 1828, Fraser accompanied Allan Cunningham on an expedition that connected the Moreton Bay settlement with the Darling Downs, via Cunninghams Gap. Later that year he was sent by the Governor to collect plants and establish a public garden at Brisbane. He also undertook many collecting trips to Van Diemen’s Land and Norfolk Island.

== Death and legacy ==
Charles Fraser died on 22 December 1831. He had collected and catalogued hundreds of Australian plants. According to Hall (1978), more than thirty plant species were named after him, including species in the genera Acacia, Boronia, Allocasuarina, Dysoxylum, Dryandra, Ficus, Hakea, Lomatia, Marsdenia, Persoonia, Sophora and Swainsona. His specimens are now principally in the herbaria at Kew; the Natural History Museum, London; the Oxford University Druce-Fielding Collection; and some have returned to the Royal Botanic Garden Sydney Herbarium.

Fraser is commemorated in the scientific name of a species of Australian lizard, Delma fraseri.
