= John Rivett-Carnac =

Royal Navy Admiral and Australian explorer (1796–1869)

Admiral John Rivett-Carnac (or Rivett Carnac; 27 June 1796 – 1 January 1869) was an officer in the Royal Navy who became an early explorer in Western Australia. He later attained the rank of admiral.

== Biography ==
John Rivett-Carnac was born in Bombay, India on 27 June 1796. He was the seventh and youngest son of the eleven children of James Rivett (1759–1802) of the East India Company (EIC) by his wife Henrietta Fisher (1765–1837), daughter of James Fisher, of Bombay. His eldest brother was James Rivett-Carnac who would become the Sir James Rivett-Carnac, 1st Bt., and a Governor of Bombay. His father assumed the name of Rivett-Carnac by Sign Manual on 17 July 1801 in compliance with the last will and testament of General John Carnac. General Carnac had married his father's sister Elizabeth and in 1776 his father went to live with them in Bombay, where he remained until his death in 1802. John Rivett-Carnac emigrated to England with his mother in 1804, two years after his father's death.

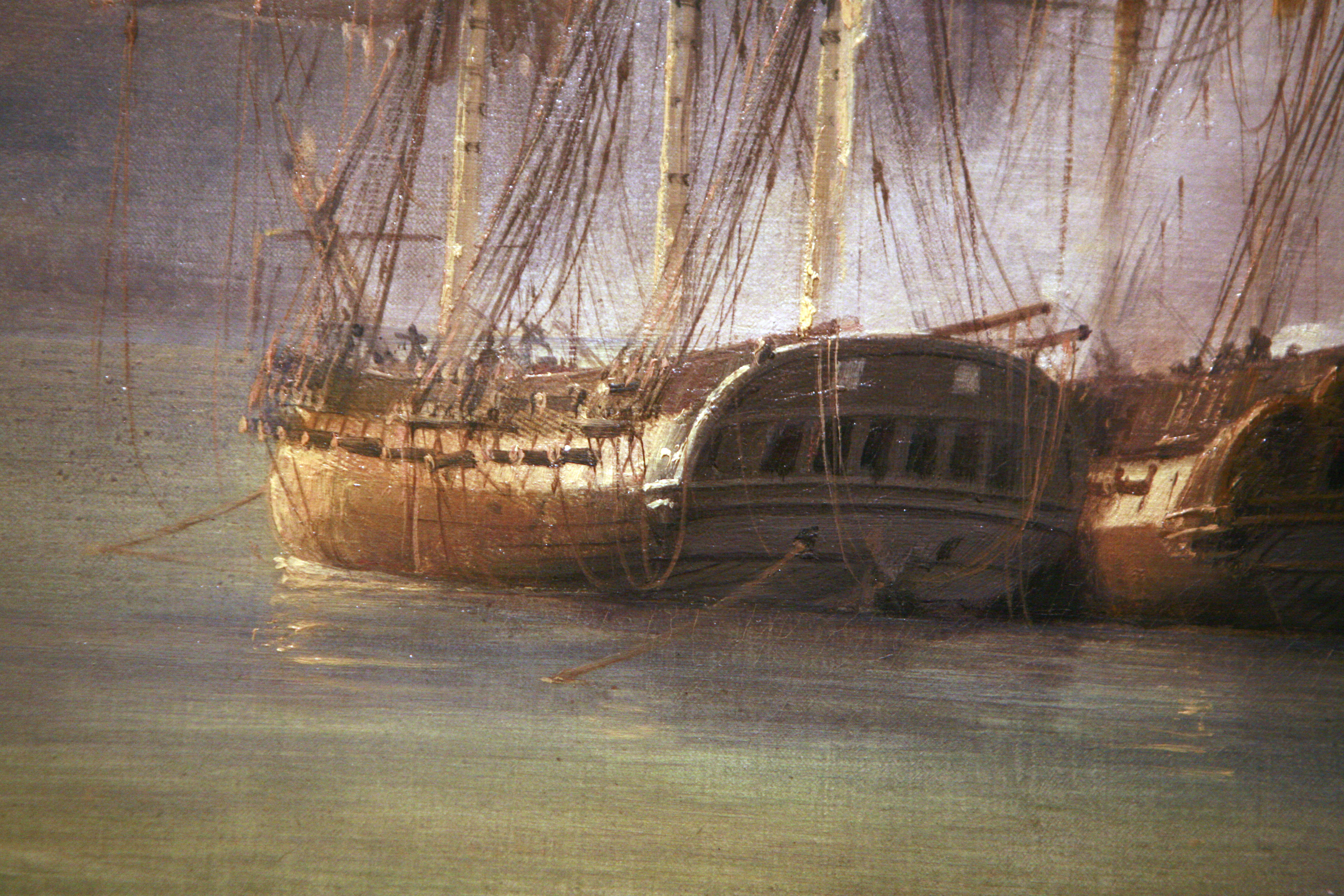
French frigate Bellone, renamed HMS Junon

He entered the Royal Naval College at Portsmouth in 1810, and in 1813 was appointed midshipman on the 38-gun Junon. He saw action in the War of 1812, taking part in operations under Sir George Cockburn and Lieutenant Philip Westphal. In October 1814 he joined the 38-gun Sybille, with whom he went to Greenland to search for the American Commodore John Rodgers. He later transferred to the 74-gun Berwick, then the 98-gun Boyne, and finally the 100-gun Queen Charlotte. After passing his Navy examinations in May 1816, he was involved in the Bombardment of Algiers. From 1816 to 1818, Rivett-Carnac served as an admiralty-midshipman on the Inconstant, and later on the Vengeur. On 1 October 1818 he was promoted to lieutenant in the Albion. In January 1819 he joined the Racehorse, and in November 1821 transferred to the Rochfort. He served on that ship until August 1825, when he was transferred to the Galatea. On 23 January 1826, John Rivett-Carnac joined Success under Captain (later Admiral Sir) James Stirling as First Lieutenant. Three months later he married Maria Jane Davis, daughter of EIC director and orientalist Samuel Davis at St. Marylebone, London.

Rivett-Carnac was on board the Success in March 1827 when the Success arrived at the Swan River in what is now Western Australia, to undertake the Swan River expedition of 1827, an exploring expedition for the purpose of assessing the area's suitability for establishing a British colony there. The Success explored the coastal waters off the Swan, during which time Stirling renamed the island named "Isle Berthelot" by the French in 1801 to Carnac Island in honour of Rivett-Carnac. Stirling then formed a party to explore up the Swan River, leaving the Success under Rivett-Carnac's command.

In April 1827, Rivett-Carnac received a military award and was promoted to Commander. Later that year, the Success spent two months in Penang, during which time sickness hit the crew. Rivett-Carnac was so ill that on 1 November he was sent home on half pay. In September 1830 he was appointed Second-Captain on the Wellesley. After leaving the ship in January 1832 he did not go to sea again, settling in London.

Rivett-Carnac was promoted to captain on 1 October 1837, rear admiral on 18 June 1857, and vice admiral on the Reserved List on 30 November 1863. He was promoted to full admiral on 8 April 1868, but died eight months later on 1 January 1869.

Although widely referred to in Western Australian sources as "John Rivett Carnac", sources relating to his later career refer to him as "John Rivett-Carnac". It is known that some of his brothers adopted "Carnac" as a surname, treating the "Rivett" as an extra forename, and it is probable that John did the same in his early career, but reverted to the hyphenated surname in later life.
