= Claise Brook =

Brook in Perth, Western Australia

Coordinates: 31°57′09″S 115°52′38″E

External videos
- East Perth 1948–2010 Landgate Aerial Photography

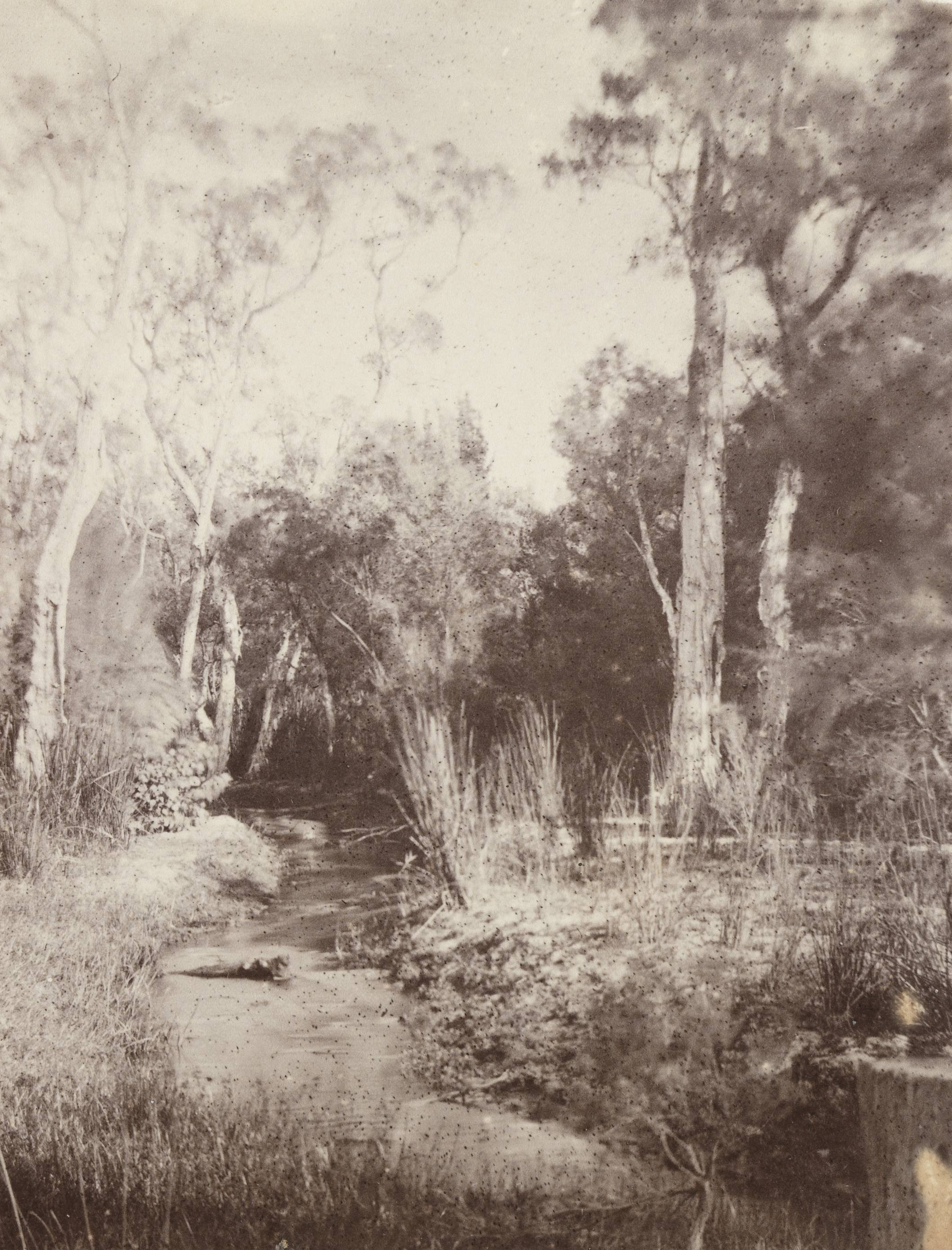
Claise Brook, 1861

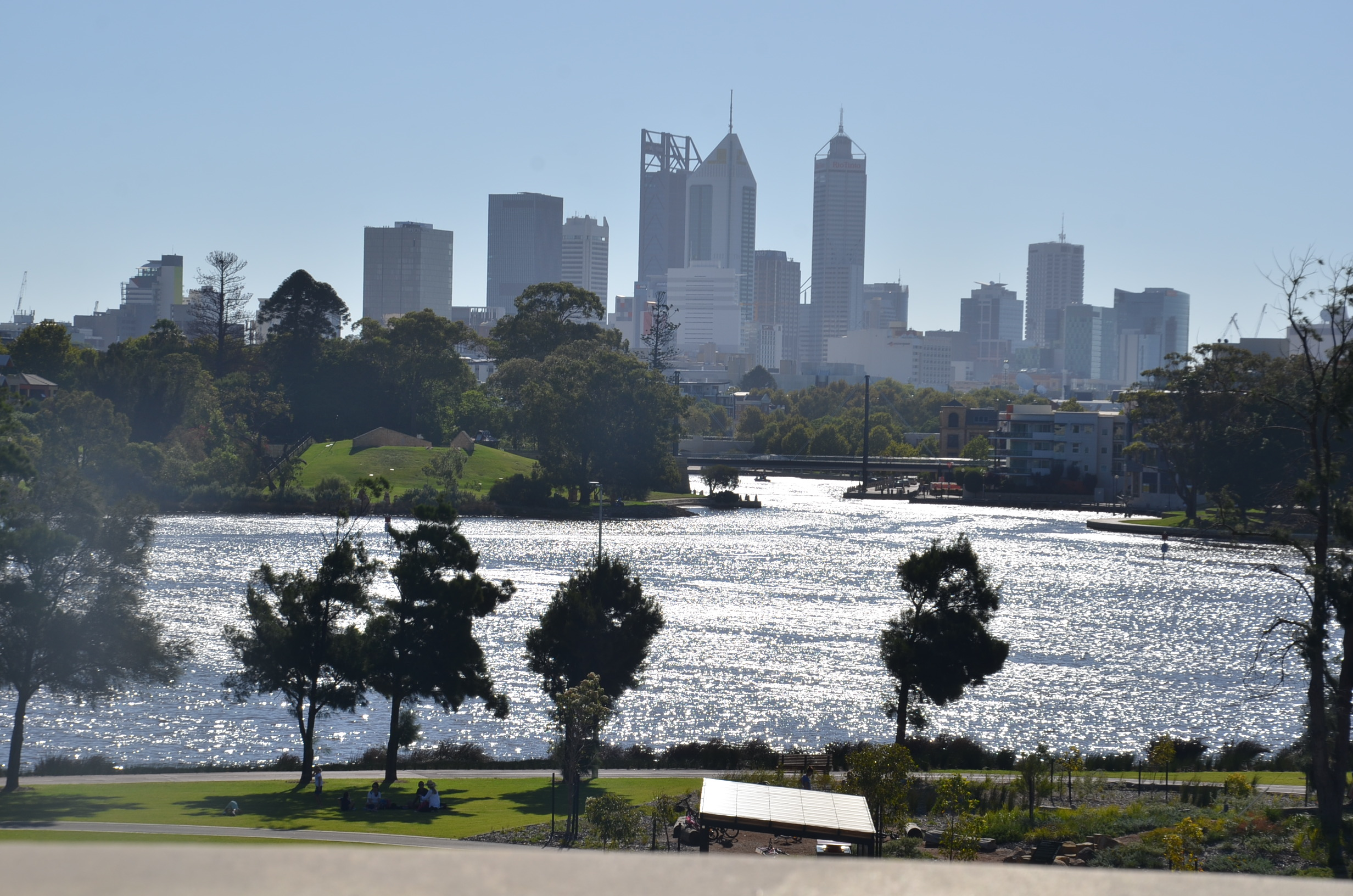
Claise Brook and Perth City skyline from the Perth City Stadium 2018

Claise Brook is a stream which empties into Claisebrook Cove before running into the Swan River in Perth, Western Australia. The area surrounding the stream is on the outskirts of the Perth CBD and is part of the suburb of East Perth. Claise Brook was once an important water course, into which the numerous interconnected fresh water lakes north of Perth emptied, during the wet season before entering the Swan River.

== History ==
Since the gradual resumption of land over the various feeder lakes, and more recently the East Perth redevelopment in the late 1980s, the stream has become a mainly underground catchment and drainage system and no longer exists as a stream in the normal sense.

The stream and cove were initially called Mandalup, meaning 'place of the small marsupial'. It was later named Clause's Brook and Clause's Lagoon respectively, however these names appear to have been dropped soon after European settlement: an 1851 newspaper report spoke of the establishment of an abattoir at "Claise Brook". They were named after Frederick Clause who was a naval surgeon that accompanied Captain (later Admiral) James Stirling in their expedition up the Swan River in March 1827. Botanist Charles Fraser who was on the same expedition described the lagoon in his journal:

One mile [1.6 km] up the river from the last point is a small creek of fresh water, issuing from an extensive lagoon clothed with arborescent species of Metrosideros of great beauty. The banks are covered with the most interesting plants, amongst which I observed two species of Calytris, a species of Acacia with a scolopendrous-stem, and several Papilionaceous plants. The Angophoras on the flats are gigantic.

Since the latter half of the 1800s until the mid-1980s, the area around Claise Brook and Claisebrook Cove was used for mainly industrial purposes and the water quality and surrounds were badly degraded. During this period it was also widely referred to as Claisebrook Drain. In the late 1800s and early 1900s it had become an effluent outlet into the river. In 1906 the Claisebrook and Burswood Sewerage Treatment Works was built. Sewerage was pumped across the river from Claise Brook to ponds and filter beds on Burswood Island.

East Perth Gasometer and East Perth Power Station were prominent structures there for many years during the 1900s, both on the northern side of the river outlet. Prior to the redevelopment from the mid-1980s, a major environmental remediation project was undertaken to remove polycyclic aromatic hydrocarbon contaminated soils created by the East Perth Gas Works which operated there from 1922 to 1971. The plant produced gas from coal. Remediation included dredging of six hectares (15 acres) of adjacent riverbeds and removal and treatment of 10,000 m^{3} (350,000 cu ft) of soil.

== Redevelopment ==
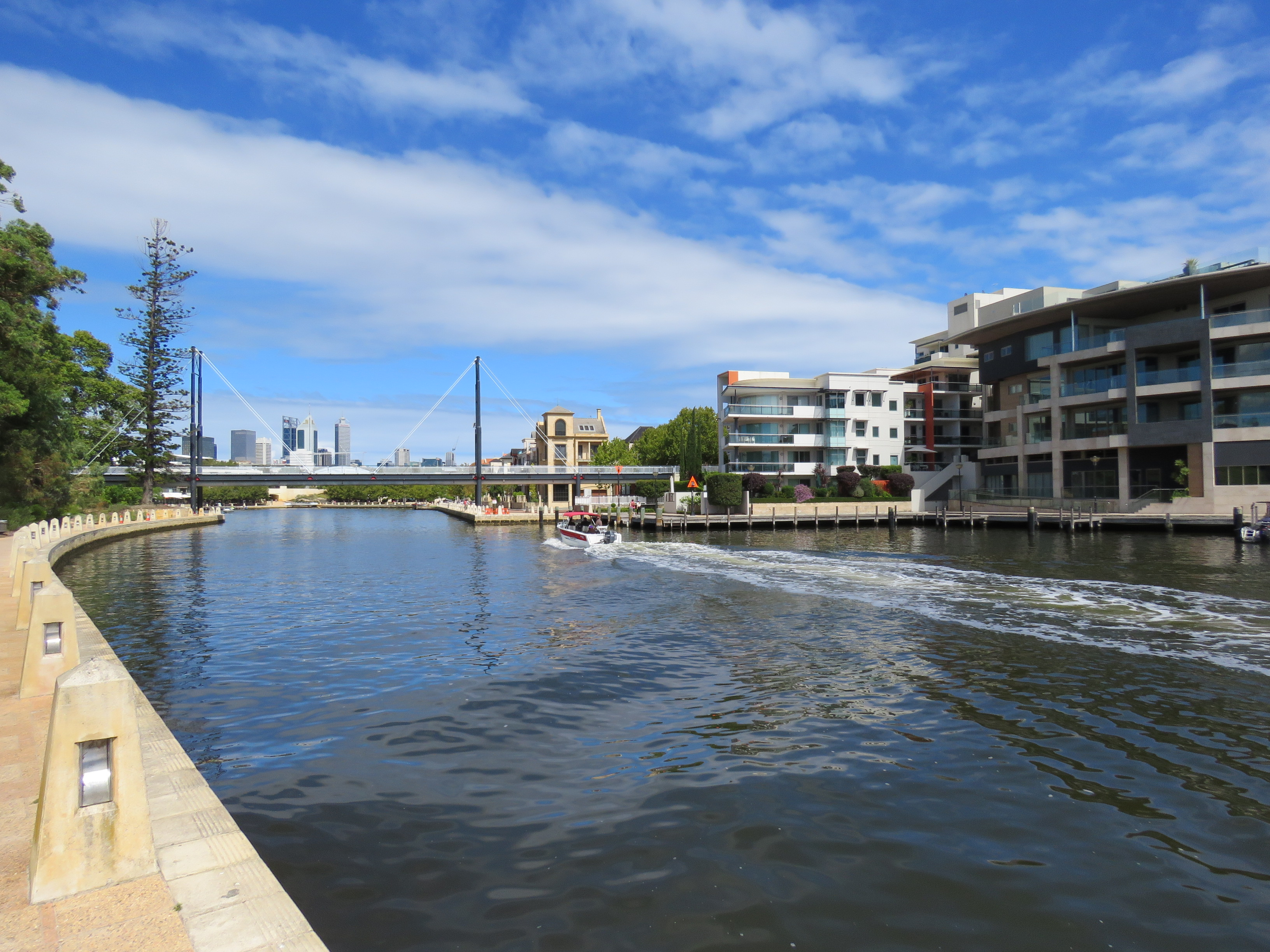
Claisebrook Cove and Trafalgar Bridge with the Perth skyline in the background in January 2021

The precinct surrounding the cove is now mainly residential and known as Claisebrook Village. The cove itself is has become a heavily landscaped artificial inlet of the Swan River overlooked by residential buildings and bars, cafes and restaurants. Facilities include moorings and jetties for recreational boating, and a pedestrian footbridge that crosses the cove called Trafalgar Bridge.

Crossing the Swan River nearby is Matagarup Bridge, Goongoongup Railway Bridge and Windan Bridge that carries road traffic from the Graham Farmer Freeway.
