= Frederick Clause =

British naval surgeon, explorer and artist

Frederick Rushbrook Clause (2 December 1791 – 10 November 1852) was a naval surgeon, an early explorer in Western Australia, and an artist.

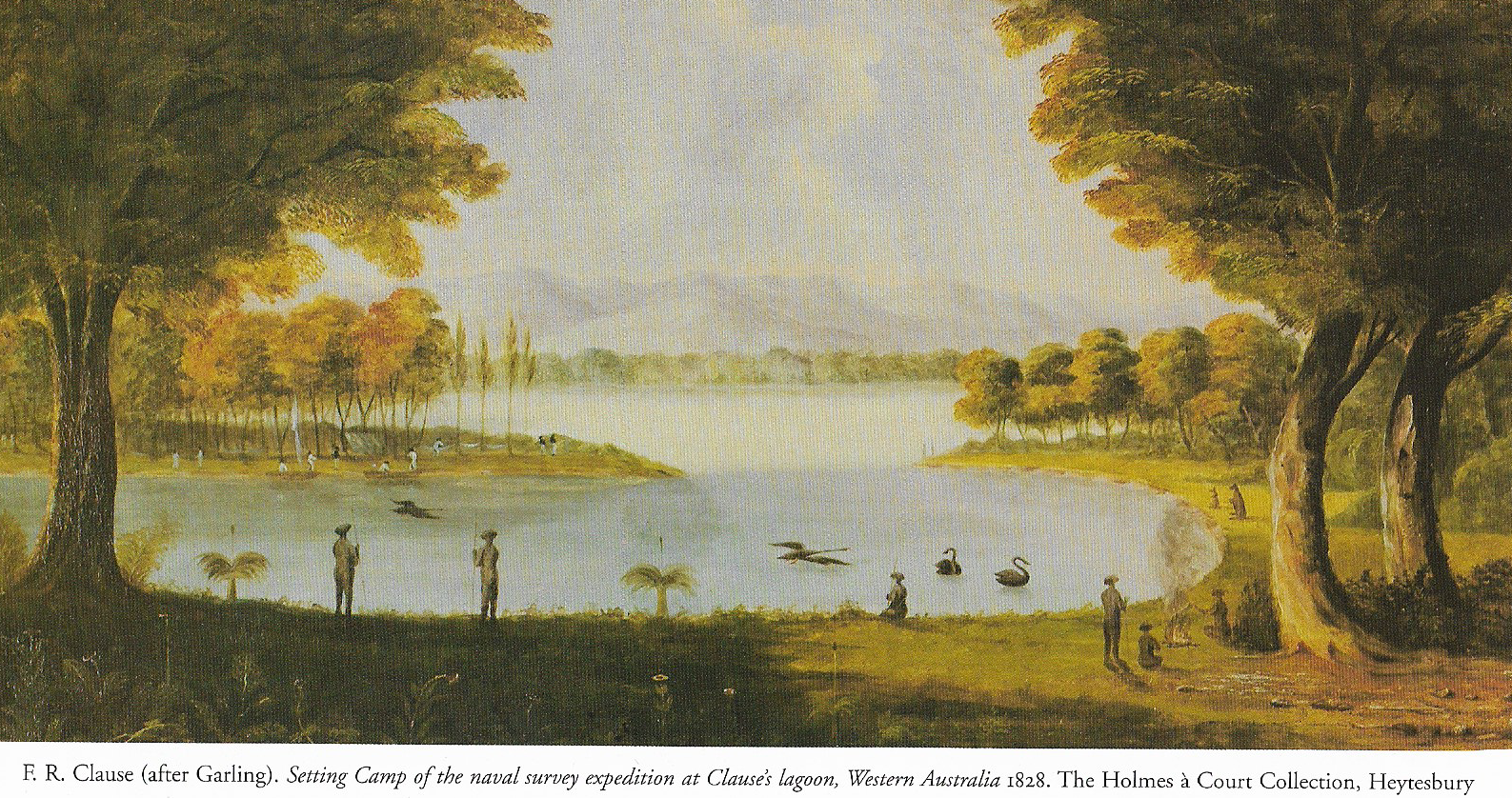
Painting by Clause from a sketch by Frederick Garling drawn in 1827 during expedition of Swan River

Clause was born on 2 December 1791, and was appointed a surgeon with the Royal Navy on 15 September 1813. In February 1826 he joined James Stirling's ship HMS Success, serving with it until August 1828. Consequently, he was on board Success in March 1827 when it arrived at the Swan River, on an exploration expedition for the purpose of assessing the area's suitability for establishing a British colony there. After exploring the coastal waters off the Swan River, Stirling selected a party of eighteen men, including Clause, to explore up the river. About a mile (1.6 km) north of the present-day location of the Causeway, a fresh water brook and lagoon was discovered, which Stirling named Clause's Brook and Clause's Lagoon respectively. These are now known as Claise Brook and Claisebrook Cove. The party camped at that lagoon on their first night.

The party eventually travelled up the Swan River as far as the junction with Ellen Brook. Before turning back, Stirling divided the party into three groups, sending them in different directions. Stirling and Clause explored to the west, where they found a fresh water brook, probably Bennett Brook.

At the end of the expedition, Clause wrote a letter on the healthiness of the climate, in support of Stirling's observations on the territory, and Charles Frazer's comments on the soil.

Some time later, Clause painted an oil painting of the party's camp at Clause's Brook. Believed to be based on a sketch by the expedition's artist Frederick Garling, it was etched and lithographed by the marine artist William John Huggins, and published under the name Setting Camp of the Naval Survey Expedition at Clause's Lagoon, Western Australia. As Garling's paintings were considered part of the official correspondence of the expedition, they were not published, so Clause's painting was the only painting of the Swan River area to be published before the establishment of the Swan River Colony in 1829.

Little is known of Clause's later life. In 1836 he married Mary Brooks at Hackney, Middlesex, England. He was still on the navy lists as late as 1841, but was then listed as unfit for active duties. He died on 10 November 1852 at Milton-next-Gravesend, Kent at the age of 60.

== General references ==
- Shoobert, Joanne, ed. (2005). Western Australian Exploration: Volume One, December 1826–December 1825. Victoria Park, Western Australia: Hesperian Press. ISBN 0-85905-351-2. OCLC 62546833.
- Statham Drew, Pamela (2003). James Stirling: Admiral and Founding Governor of Western Australia. Crawley: UWA Publishing. ISBN 978-1-876268-94-7. LCCN 2003464253. OL 3760974M. Wikidata Q136431983.
