= Carnac Island =

Island of Western Australia

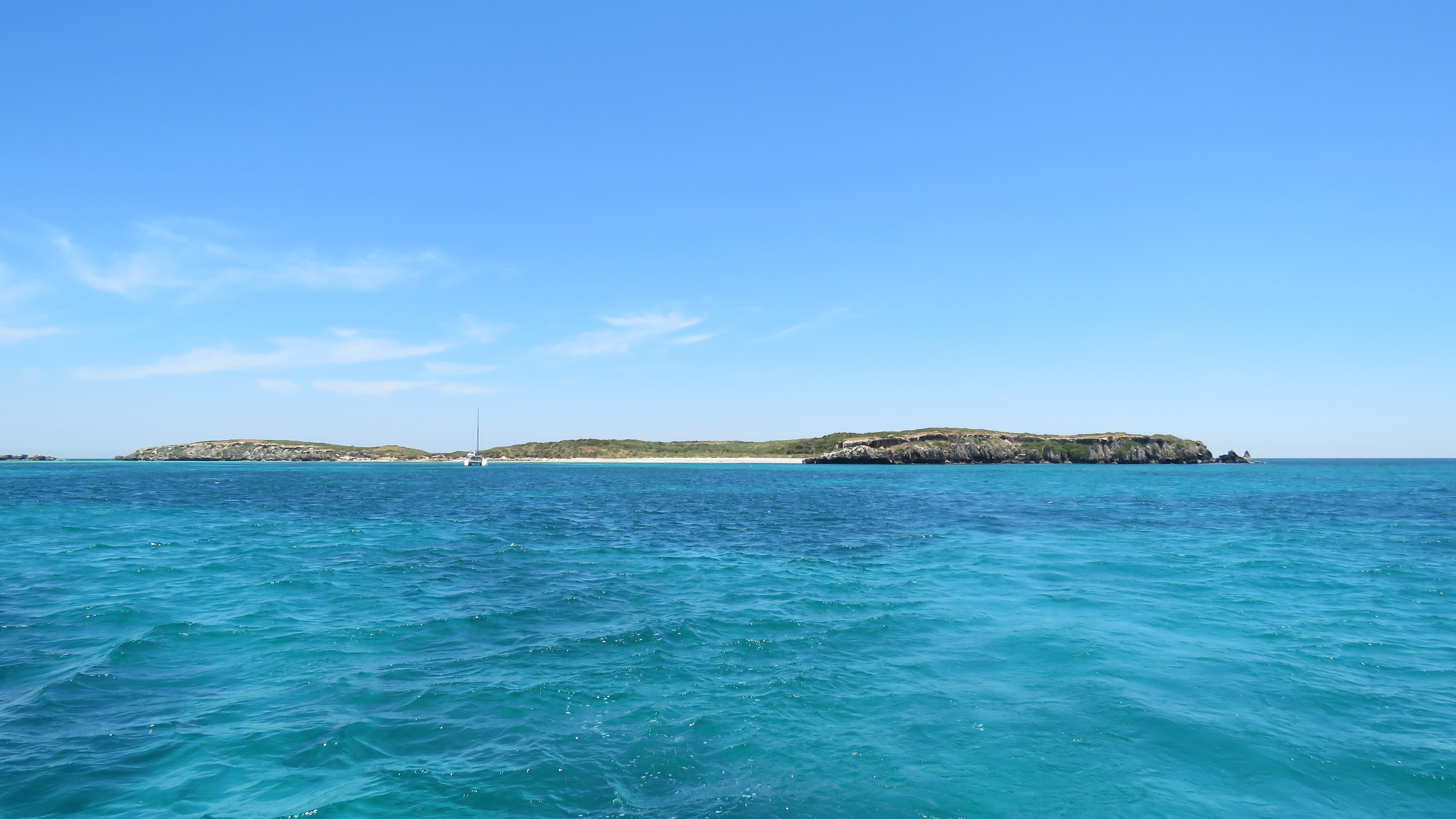
- Carnac Island seen from the east

- Location of Carnac Island in Western Australia
- Etymology: John Rivett-Carnac

Geography
- Location: Indian Ocean
- Coordinates: 32°07′22″S 115°39′49″E
- Total islands: 1
- Area: 19 ha (47 acres)

Administration
- Australia
- State: Western Australia
- Local Government Area: City of Cockburn

Additional information
- Time zone: Australian Western Standard Time (UTC+08:00)

Carnac Island (Nyungar: Ngoorloormayup, lit. 'place of little brother') is a 19-hectare (47-acre), A-Class, island nature reserve about 10 kilometres (6.2 mi) south-west of Fremantle and 3.5 kilometres (2.2 mi) north of Garden Island in Western Australia.

== History ==
Carnac Island is aeolianite limestone remnant of Pleistocene dunes.

In 1803, French explorer Louis de Freycinet, captain of Casuarina, named the island Île Pelée ('Bald Island'). It was also known as Île Lévilian and later Île Berthelot. In 1827, James Stirling changed its name to Pulo Carnac Island in honour of John Rivett Carnac, Second Lieutenant on his ship HMS Success. Pulo is Malay for 'island'; it is not known why Stirling included the term, and it was soon dropped.

From 1836 to 1837, the island served as a whaling station. The whalers transported Perth's first church to the island to be used as a storehouse. It was abandoned within a few years.

From October to November 1838, the island was declared by the Swan River Colony colonial government to be a prison for indigenous Australians. The prison consisted of two guards, an overseer named Robert Menli Lyon, and three prisoners named Yagan, Danmera, and Ningina. The solitary conditions resulted in the soldiers assisting the prisoners' escape in a stolen government stores boat.

In 1884, the colonial government gazetted the island as a quarantine station for Fremantle, but it appears never to have been used for that purpose.

In 1916, the Australian Federal Government assumed control over the island for defence purposes, and the island was transferred back to the State of Western Australia in 1961.

The Carnac Island Nature Reserve was gazetted on 8 March 1963, has a size of 0.22 square kilometres (0.085 mi^{2}), and is located within the Swan Coastal Plain bioregion. Apart from Carnac Island itself, the nature reserve includes the rocks north and south of the island.

== Fauna ==
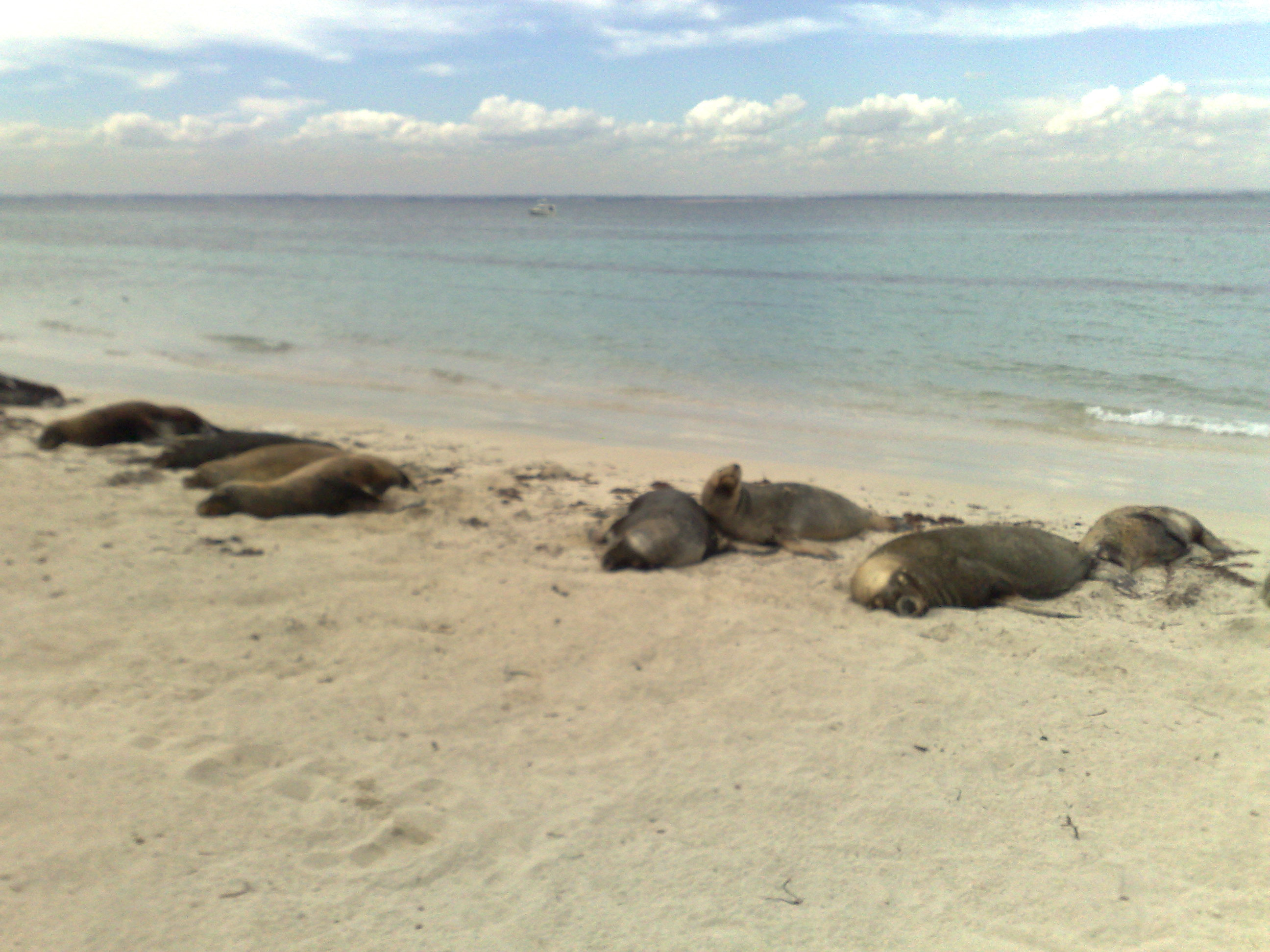
Sea lions on Carnac Island

The island is home to Australian sea lions, bottlenose dolphins and a large range of marine bird life. New Zealand fur seals are frequent visitors. Rabbits inhabited the island in abundance from 1827 to 1897, but were eradicated in 1969. It is particularly noted for the abundance and size of snakes, particularly tiger snakes, which live there. The island is densely populated with up to three tiger snakes in every 25 square metres (270 square feet).

There is no permanent fresh water, providing a challenge for the animals that live there. The tiger snake colony has attracted research into how that species has adapted to a harsh island habitat, and the colony's origins has attracted significant debate. One example of a theory is that in 1929 a man named Lindsay "Rocky" Vane dumped his tiger snake collection on the island, after snake exhibitions were banned in Western Australia, after Vane's wife and his assistant died from snake bite. King's skinks also inhabit the island, and there is evidence of confrontation between King's skinks and tiger snakes.

In November 2006, naturalist David Attenborough visited the island with a BBC film crew to record a reptile documentary, in which Attenborough provided commentary on the blindness of many of the island's tiger snakes. This is caused by birds defending their chicks by pecking at the snakes' eyes. These blind snakes survive and thrive, relying upon scent and eating immobile prey such as seabird chicks. Carnac Island is the only place where this has been observed. Male tiger snakes largely out-number female tiger snakes on the island, which is another curiosity of the island's tiger snake colony.

Carnac Island is classified as an Important Bird Area because it supports a large colony of the vulnerable fairy tern, as well as small numbers of other nesting seabirds.

== See also ==
- Islands of Perth, Western Australia
