= East Perth Power Station =

Decommissioned power station in East Perth, Western Australia

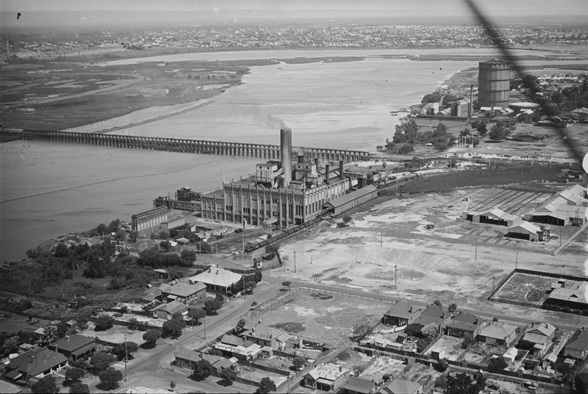
- East Perth Power Station at the centre of this 1930 photograph: Bunbury Bridge crosses the river and East Perth Gas Works is at the top right

General information
- Type: Power Station
- Location: East Perth, Western Australia
- Coordinates: 31.94624°S 115.88047°E

Western Australia Heritage Register
- Type: State Registered Place
- Designated: 8 January 2016
- Reference no.: 3318

The East Perth Power Station is a disused power station in East Perth, Western Australia. For most of its life it was coal-fired, but ran on oil for six years. The site consists of a complex of industrial buildings occupying more than 8.5 hectares (21 acres), bounded by East Parade, Summers Street, the Swan River and the Graham Farmer Freeway.

== History ==
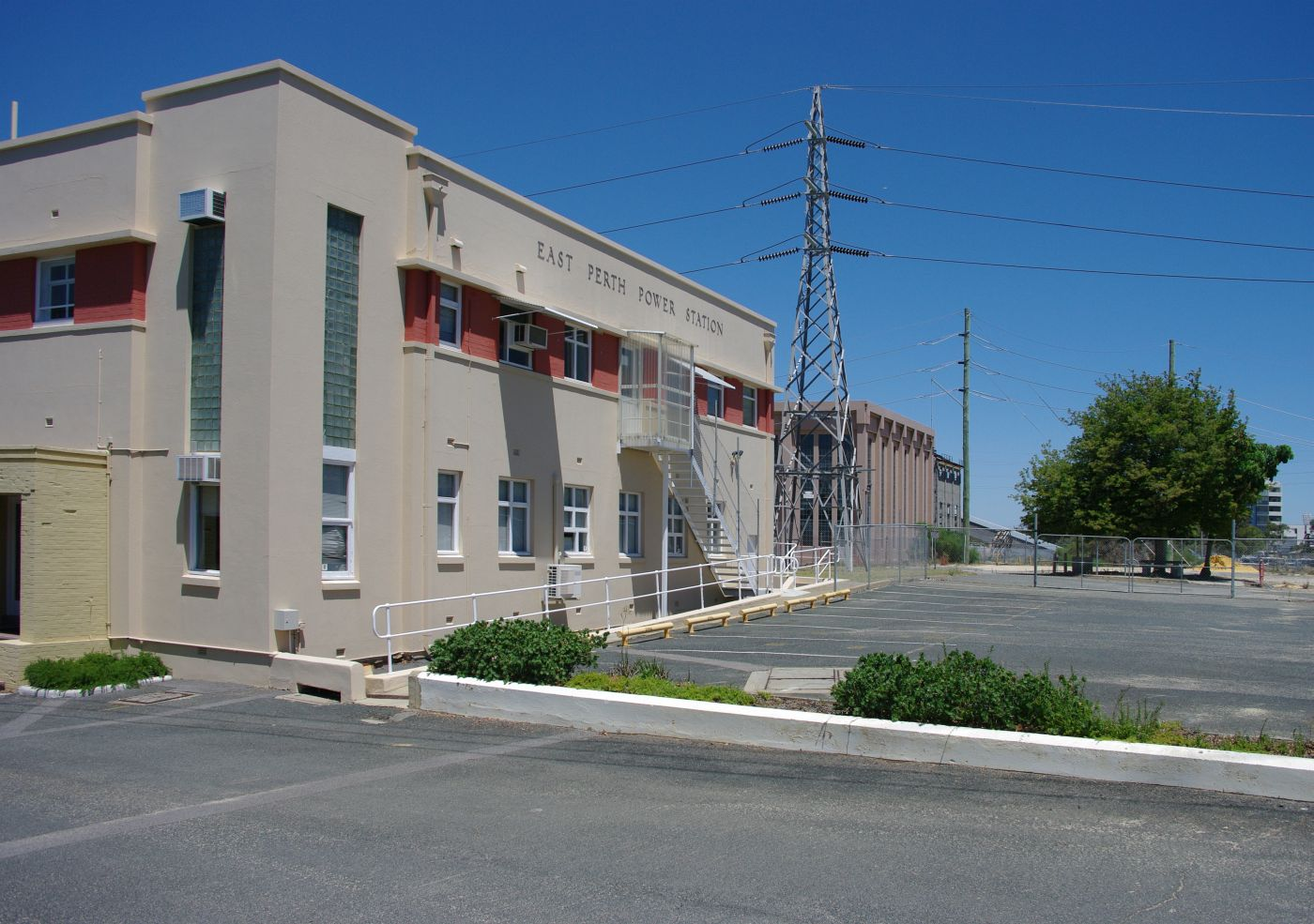
Administration building with generating building in the background

The power station was constructed between 1913 and 1916 by the Government of Western Australia, which announced that the facility would generate all the electricity needed in the Perth metropolitan area. The site in East Perth was chosen because coal could easily be delivered there by rail and because the enormous quantities of cooling water required by the condensing plant could easily be drawn from the Swan River. Construction was completed at a total cost of £A 538,000, equivalent to A$61.4 million in 2022.

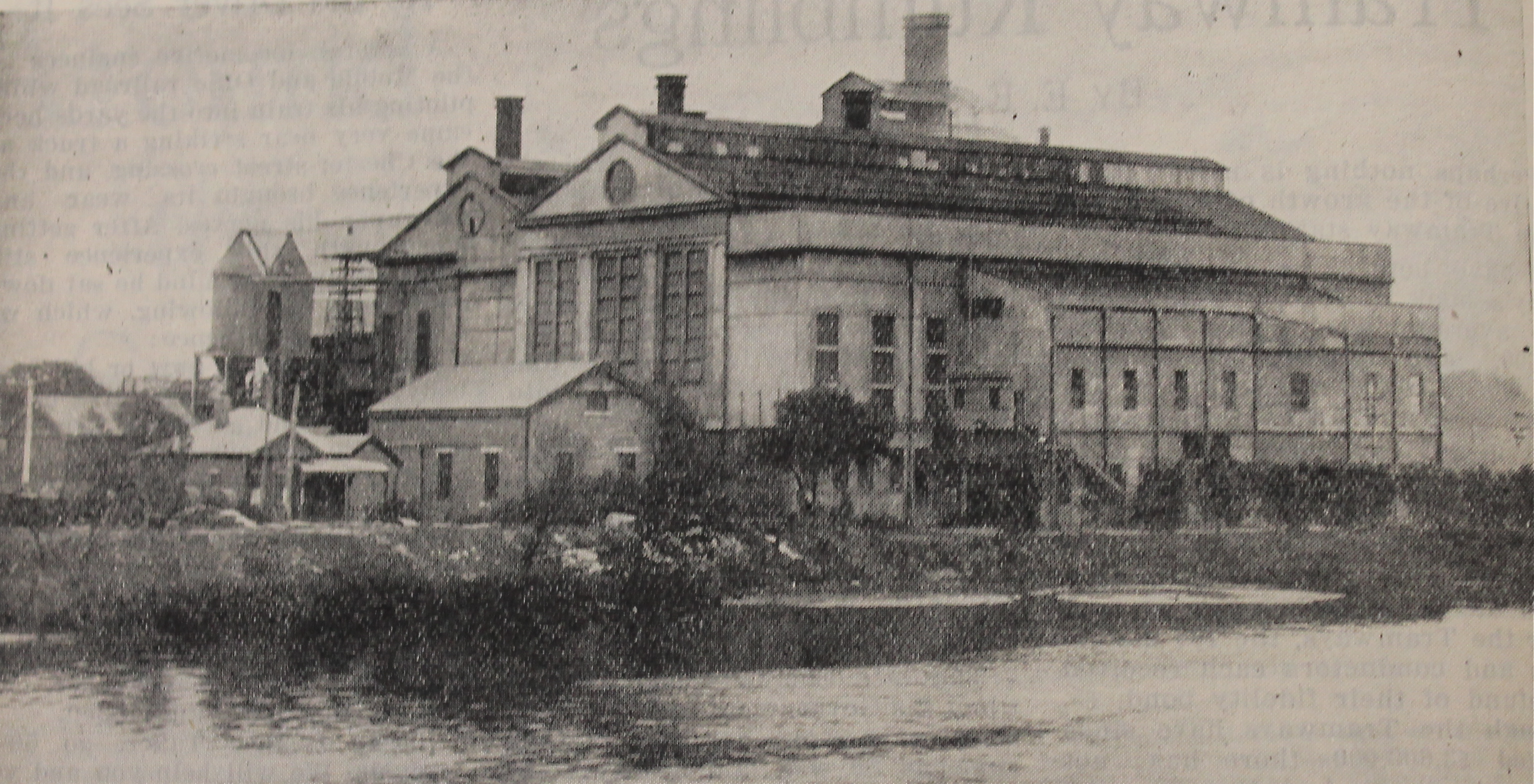
East Perth Power House in 1929

In the 1920s, 1930s and 1950s new power generators were added to the facility to meet the city's growing demand for power. By 1948 the station had an array of power generating sources.

In 1968 the station converted from coal to oil, but six years later returned to coal firing. The station was decommissioned and closed in December 1981, as more advanced and cheaper methods of electricity generation made the facility redundant.

== Conservation and protection ==
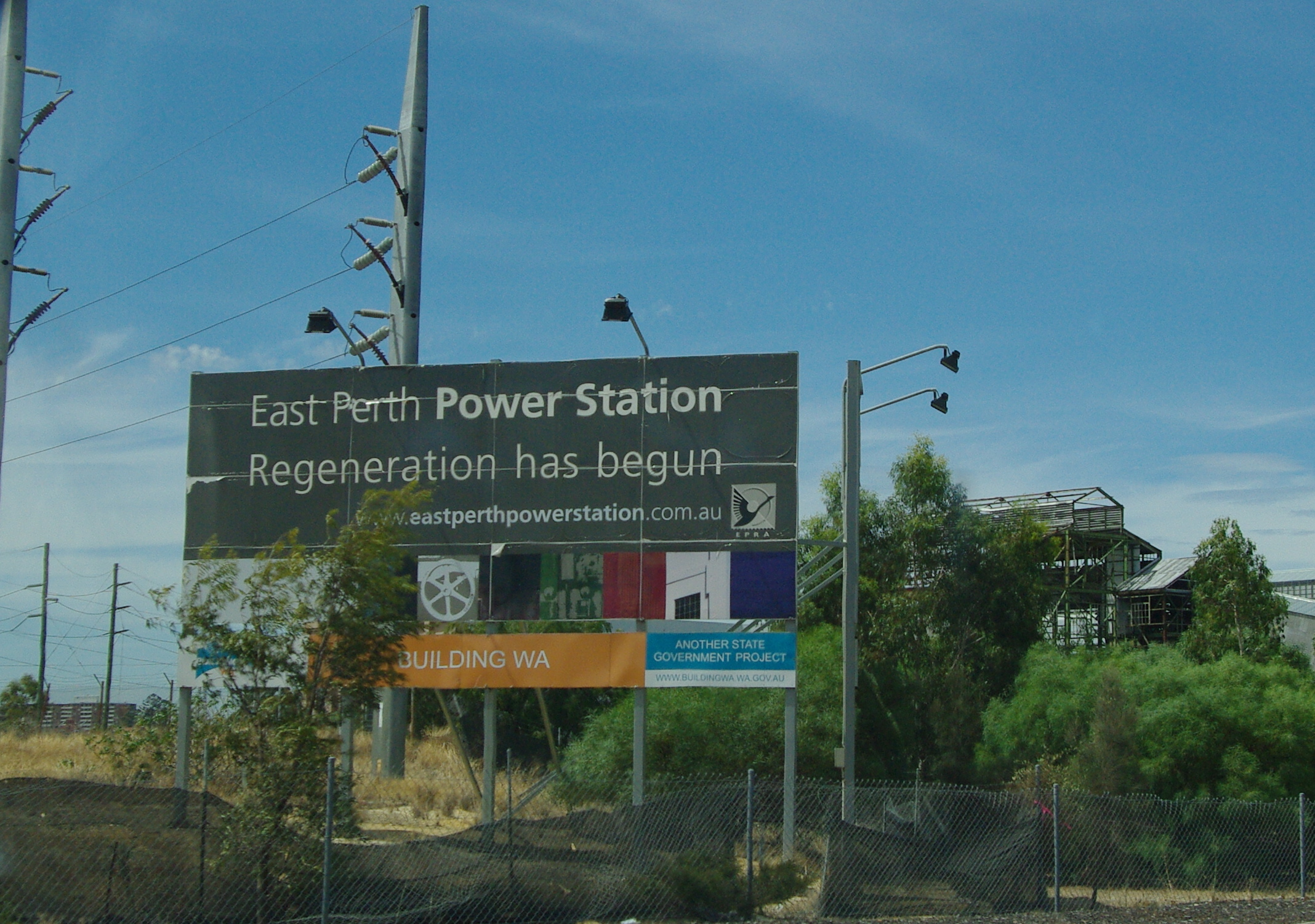
Sign when the plans for rebuilding as a museum were still current

The East Perth Power Station is considered to be one of the state's most significant industrial heritage buildings. It includes a range of remnant machinery and equipment that is believed to be unique in the world because it contains the five different stages of power generation technology that occurred in the 20th century.

As early as 1993 plans were in place for conservation and protection of the site.

In 2007 an oral history project was conducted of former workers at the site. The recordings are held at J S Battye Library.

In 2011, University of Western Australia historian Charles Fox published a history of the station Powering Perth.

== Proposed redevelopment ==
In the 2000s the East Perth Redevelopment Authority developed a draft master plan for the site's future use, which went out to the public during a three-month community consultation period (7 November 2004 – 28 February 2005). Site works commenced in July 2004 and included a general clean up, building stabilisation and weather proofing.

In early 2005 the Government of Western Australia appointed a Major Stadia Taskforce to report on the construction of a new stadium in Perth. Its final report recommended the construction of a new 60,000-seat stadium at either Kitchener Park (which adjoins Subiaco Oval) or at the East Perth Power Station site. In early 2008 the government confirmed that Subiaco Oval would be demolished for the new Perth super-stadium to be built next door at Kitchener Park. This site was chosen ahead of the other suggested site at the Power Station, which was instead to house a new $500 million museum. Planning and design of the new museum was to begin in 2008, with construction expected to begin in 2012. The extensive fit-out required for the museum was scheduled to start in 2013, with completion of the entire project expected in late 2015. The redevelopment was to have been overseen by the government's Office of Strategic Projects.

Following the election of the Barnett government, the redevelopment plans were scrapped in early February 2009 as part of a response to reduce government expenditure.

In February 2015, the site was subdivided into four lots for sale to developers. The first lot offered for sale includes the power station building, which the purchaser would be required to preserve and redevelop.

In 2020, Minderoo Group and Australian Capital Equity were nominated as preferred developers, but both companies withdrew from the joint venture in February 2023. The exclusive rights expired in March 2023 and were not renewed due to insufficient progress on the project.

In late 2024, it was announced that the power station would be used as an entertainment precinct for the Perth Festival over the coming four years. The first event was held in 2025, marking the first time the site was open to the general public in over four decades, and featured purpose-built stages for live music featuring international acts, artworks by local First Nations artists, food vendors, and more.
