= Mount Eliza (Western Australia) =

Hill in Perth, Western Australia

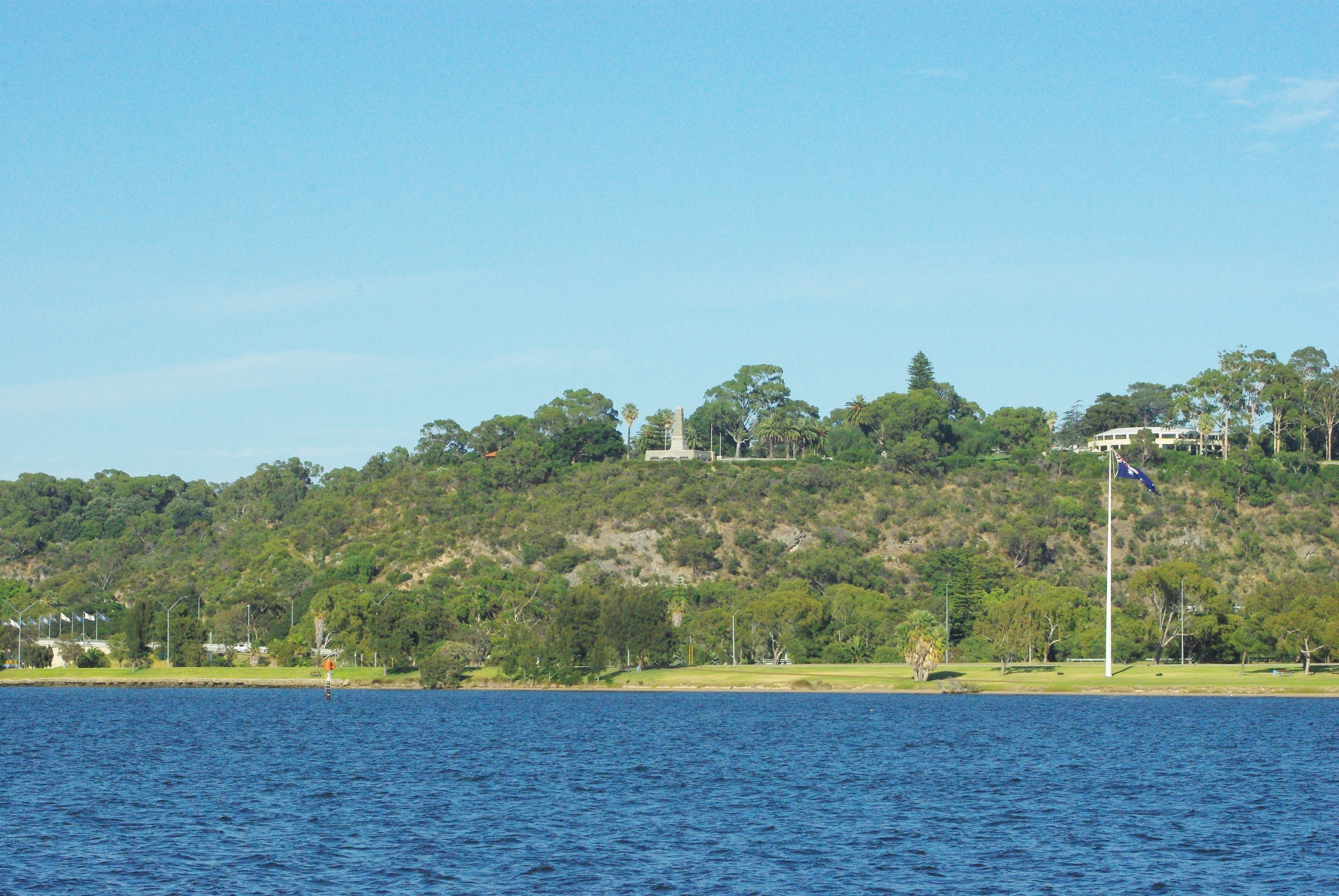

Highest point
- Elevation: 103 m (338 ft)
- Coordinates: 31.9643°S 115.8362°E

Naming
- Native name: Moora Katta (Nyungar)

Geography
- Location within Perth
- Location: Perth Western Australia

Geology
- Rock age: Pleistocene ~ 40,000 years
- Mountain type: Hill

Mount Eliza is a hill that overlooks the city of Perth, Western Australia and forms part of Kings Park. It is known as Kaarta Gar-up and Mooro Katta in the local Noongar dialect.

As part of Kings Park, Mount Eliza receives over 5 million annual visitors due to events such as the Anzac Day Memorial service, the Australia Day fireworks and the Kings Park festival. In addition to these events, Mount Eliza attracts visitors and interest with its ecosystems, indigenous and colonial history, landmarks and other activities.

== Naming ==
The local Noongar people refer to the peak of Mount Eliza as Mooro Katta and Kaarta Gar-up. The southern base of Mount Eliza is known as Gooninup and is considered a significant site for ceremonies and dreaming for Aboriginal males.

In 1827, James Stirling of HMS Success inspected the Swan River for potential future colonisation. In this expedition Mount Eliza was named after Eliza Darling, the wife of New South Wales Governor Ralph Darling. In July 1901, Perth Park was renamed to the Kings Park honouring the new king Edward VII.

== Geography ==
=== Geology ===
Geologically, Mount Eliza is part of the Spearwood Dunal system which were formed during the Pleistocene glacial and interglacial periods around 40,000 years ago. This system is identifiable by its yellow brown sands over Tamala Limestone. Mount Eliza's soil is of the Karrakatta soil association, formed from calcareous beach sand containing 50–70% calcium carbonate. The leaching of this carbonate over time has created the limestone bases which have been exposed as the Swan River has receded. A drilling survey in 1971 found that both the escarpment and tableland area had a diverse nature of sand grain, depth and overall fertility. This diversity of sand sheets is explained by the operation of Aeolian deposition and erosion over extended periods of time. Underlying sand loam sheets, with perched water tables are considered highly important for vegetation growth and subsequent stabilisation. The Botanic Gardens and Parks Authority manages risk associated with geotechnical instability, and between 1995 and 2020 has made two geotechnical inspections with no major concerns.

=== Flora ===
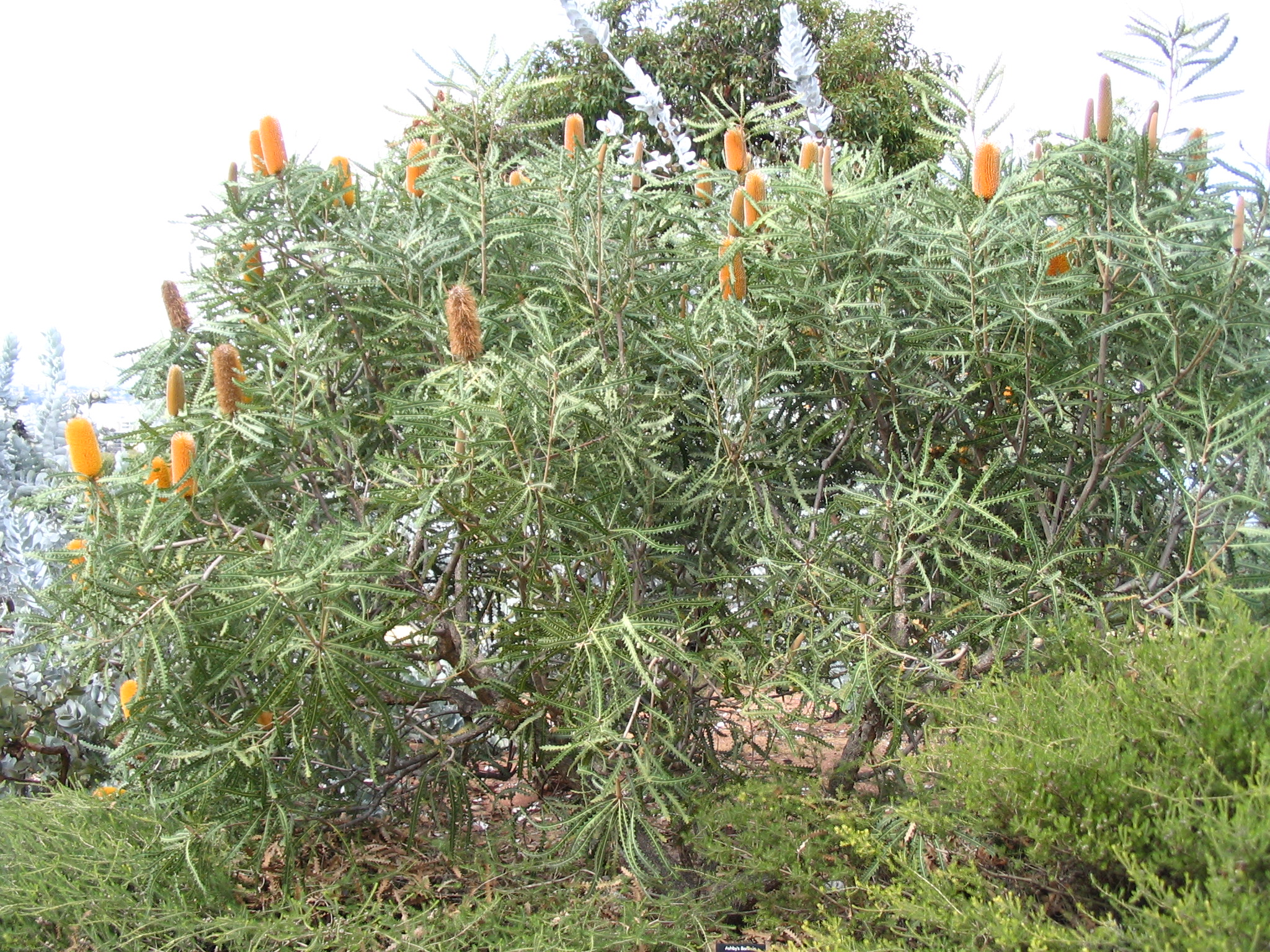
Low Banksia

Within Mount Eliza's tableland and escarpment area there are 326 species of local native plants growing, which represents close to 15% of the native flora in the Perth region. Within this, three major plant communities are supported; limestone health land, banksia woodland and low moist areas.

Prior to European settlement, the bushland would have been dominated by tall Tuart (eucalyptus gomphocephala), Jarrah (Eucalyptus marginata) and Marri (Corymbia calophylla) with Banksia species sub-dominating. Today the bushland is dominated by Banksia species, and the original ecosystem of tall open forest of tuart-jarrah-marri is likely collapsing to be replaced by Banksia and low woodlands. This is a natural sequence, yet some say it has been accelerated by disturbance from settlement.

Over 265 presumed species of macro fungi have been identified within the King Park's bushland, and almost all of these species are considered to be indigenous to the area.

=== Fauna ===
Kings Park has a wide variety of local birds and invertebrates, with over seventy bird species, twenty reptile species and hundreds of different invertebrates within the bushland of Mount Eliza.

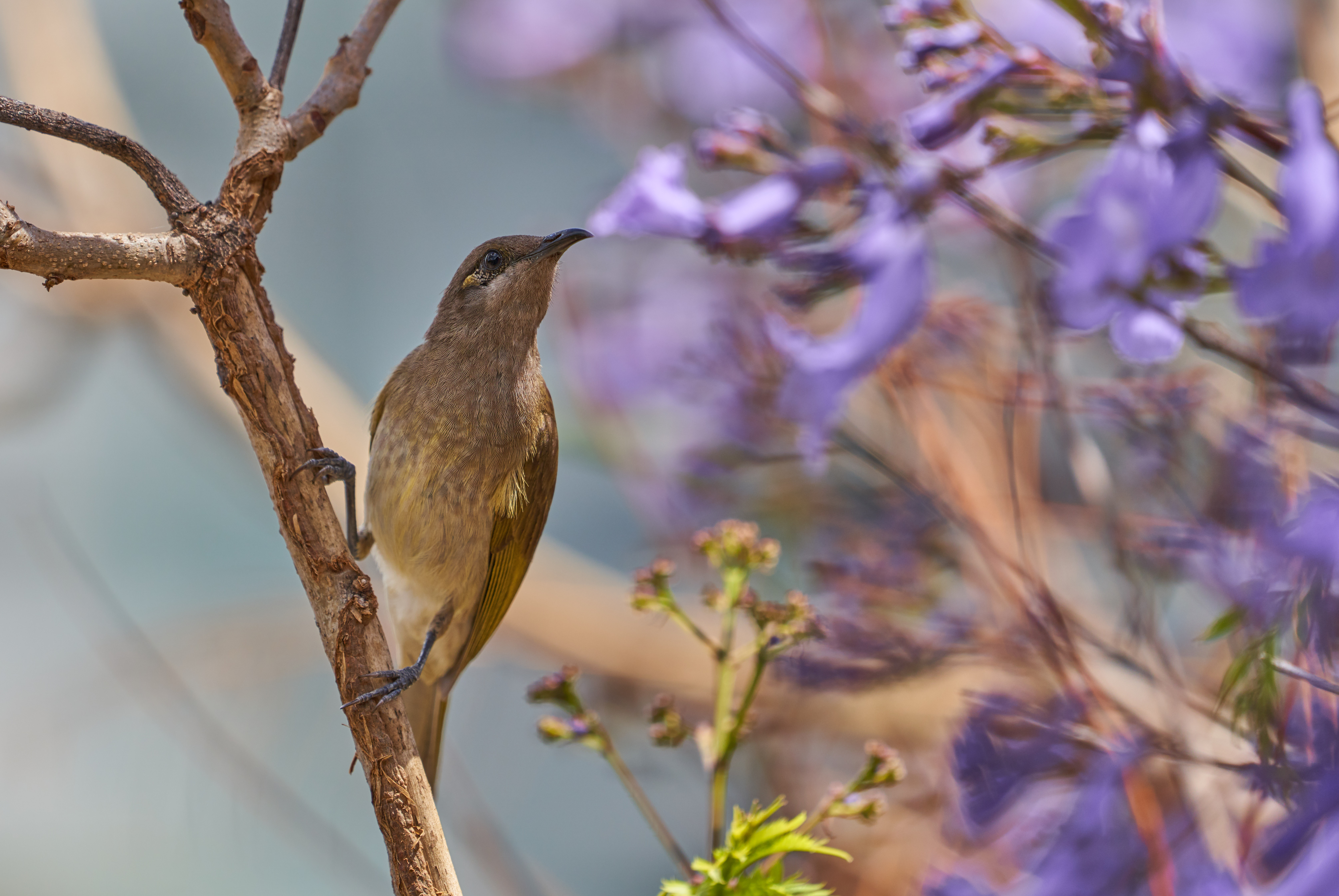
Brown Honeyeater

Kings Park and the Mount Eliza escarpment has been subject to various long-term studies on urban avifauna. A study in 1996 found that the Brown Honeyeater and Red Wattlebird were the two most abundant birds in the Mount Eliza escarpment. In addition, the study found that there was a higher abundance of birds, specifically nectivores during the spring season, likely due to the flowering plants. Despite this increase, there was a relatively small amount of nectivores in the Mount Eliza escarpment compared to other regions studied. Furthermore, a study in 2013 found that the three most abundant species in the bushland surrounding Mount Eliza were the Brown Honeyeater, Singing Honeyeater and Red Wattlebird.

Invertebrates of significant conservation value such as the Scarp Snail and the trapdoor spider are confined to the Mount Eliza escarpment of Kings Park.

== History ==
=== Aboriginal ===
==== Dreamtime ====
Noongar people believe that the Waugal rose from Ga-Ra-Katta (Mount Eliza escarpment) and formed the Swan River (Derbarl Yerrigan) and the Canning River (Djarlgarro Beelier). The Waugal is the major spirit for Noongar people and is a Rainbow Serpent, a snakelike Dreamtime creature that is a common deity often seen as the creator God – the giver of life. Gooninup is a site of great Aboriginal significance at the foot of Mount Eliza as it is believed when the Waugal created the Swan River, Gooninup served as its resting place.

==== Colonial interactions ====
In 1834, the sacred site Gooninup was set aside as a teaching camp for Aboriginal people, although a different source proposes that due to escalating violence between settlers and Noongar people it was considered expedient to provide the land to local people. By mid-1830s the Mount Eliza Native Institution was providing supplies to around 50 Noongar people, however by 1838 most of the Noongar population had either died or moved away from the area. Shortly after this movement, legislation was put in place creating the Perth Prohibited Area that Aboriginal people were forbidden to enter without written permission. This restricted Aboriginal access to Gooninup for over a century until it was repealed in 1954.

=== Colonisation (1827–1900) ===
Captain James Stirling, Commander of HMS Success, inspected the Swan River in 1827 hoping to establish a future colony. Climbing the peak of Mount Eliza, he commented that the surround country, meandering river and distant mountains are "particularly grand".

Noongar elder Yellegonga supposedly accepted the newcomers as Stirling founded the Colony of Western Australia at Perth on 1 June 1829.

In 1832, Surveyor General John Septimus Roe refused permission to cut timber on Mount Eliza and indicated it should be reserved for public purposes. However, first export from the colony was 5 tonnes (11 thousand pounds) of Jarrah logged from Mount Eliza in 1836.

In 1896, the upper levels of lots along the Mount Eliza scarp were resumed to Perth park, later named Kings Park.

== Land usage ==
=== Tourism ===
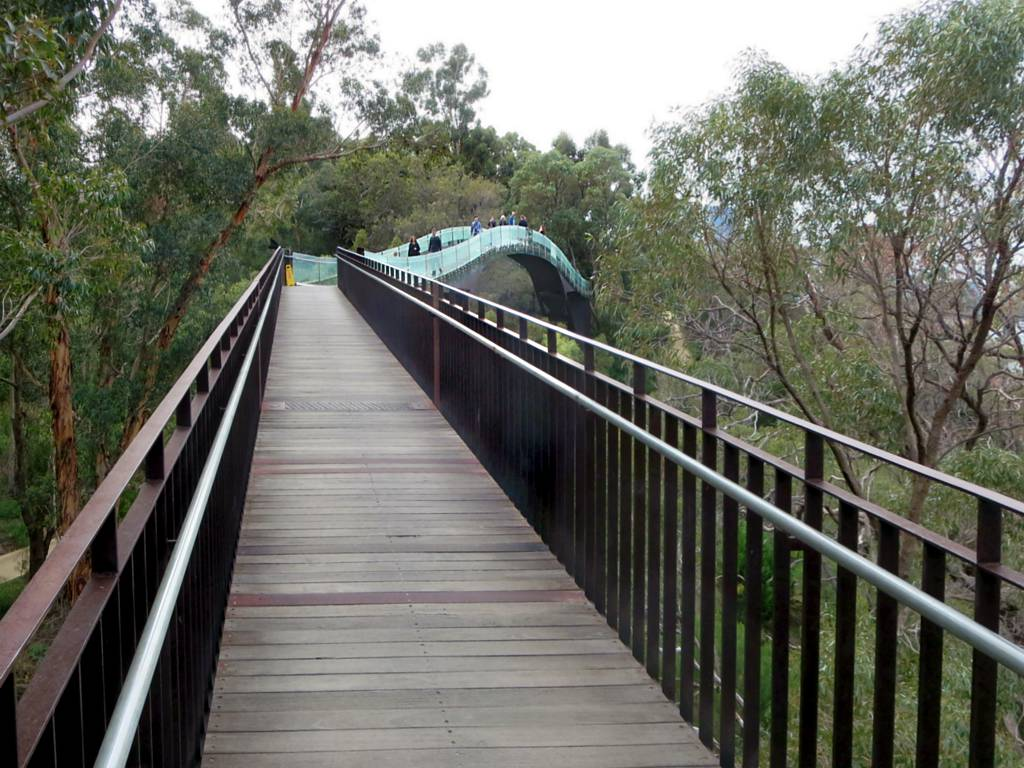
Lotterywest Federation Walkway path

A variety of Kings Park tourist activities are interlinked with Mount Eliza such as Aboriginal cultural experiences, guided walks, walkways and overall sightseeing.

==== Lotterywest Federation Walkway ====
Since opening in 2003, the 52-metre (171 ft) elevated steel and glass bridge is one of Kings Park most notable tourist attractions. It is said that Mount Eliza performs a mediating role between the city and the bushland of Kings Park, and Federation Walkway is intended to allow visitors to appreciate this distinction and appreciate the heritage of the landscape. Local Noongar artwork is incorporated in the design of the walkway with metal drawings into the bridge and a tiered performance area at the end of the walkway named Beedawong.

==== Beedawong ====
Beedawong, meaning 'celebration' or 'meeting place', is a stone amphitheatre located on the tableland area of Mount Eliza, west of Federation Walkway. The venue was constructed in 2003 to provide a place for ongoing Noongar cultural activities and visitor activities.

=== Memorials ===
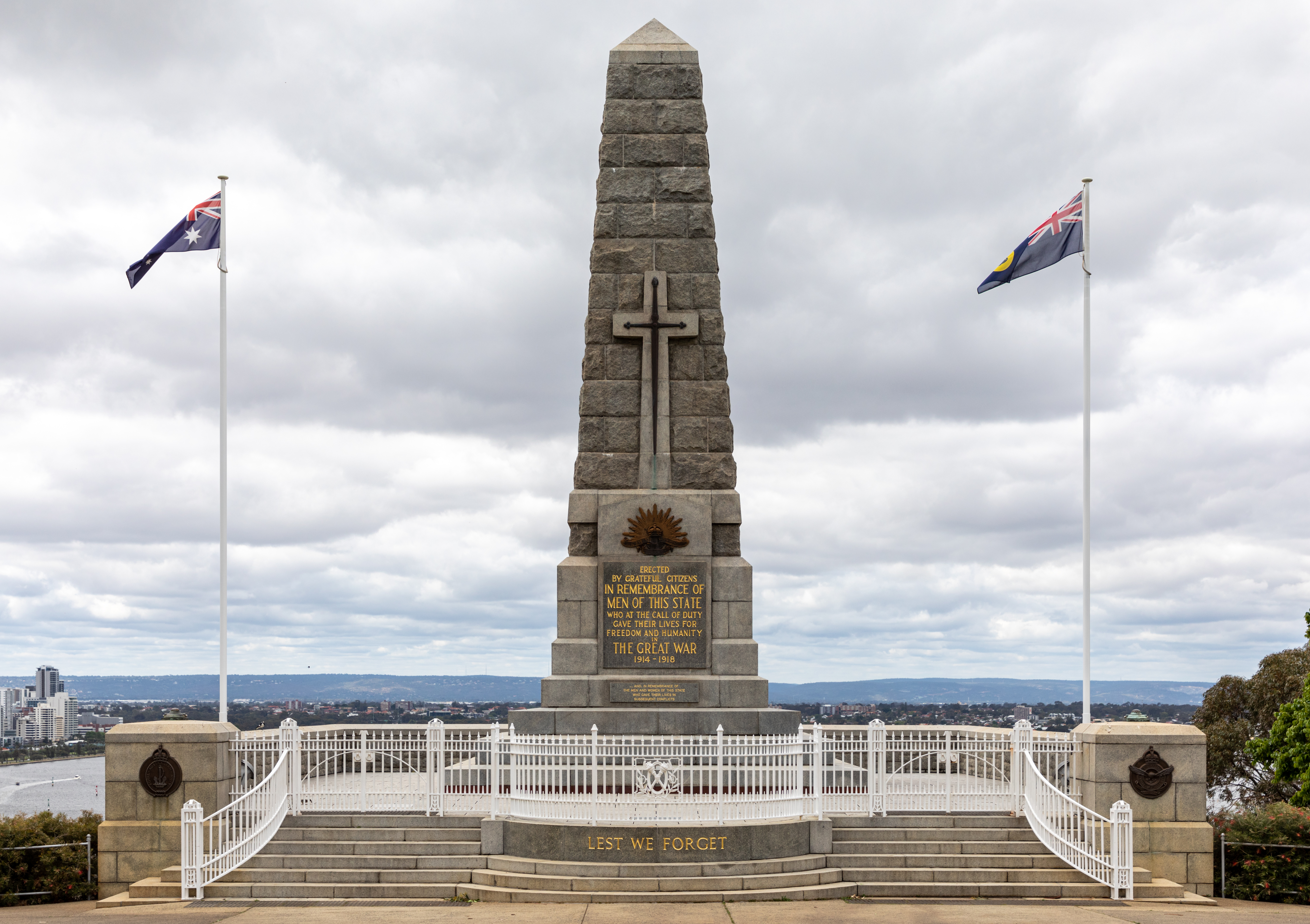
Kings Park State War Memorial

The Western Australian War Memorial is situated at the peak of Mount Eliza and was unveiled on 24 November 1929 by the State Governor William Campion. It can be described as a granite obelisk (cenotaph) surrounded by loggia in which the names of those who died in or out of service are inscribed. In addition to the cenotaph, the memorial precinct in Kings Park includes the court of contemplation, flame of remembrance and pool of reflection. The cenotaph includes names of more than 7,000 members of service. This memorial receives more than 40,000 visitors each year during the Anzac Day Dawn Service.

=== Reservoir ===
In 1895, 180 hectares (450 acres) of land was excised from the public park land which was then titled public park Mt Eliza. Construction of Mount Eliza reservoir for Perth's Water supply was then commenced on this land. 1896 was a period of rapid population growth in Perth which resulted in a strain on the city's water supply. It is said that some households in Perth went without water for days since the pipe connecting to the Mount Eliza reservoir was too small. This original reservoir was demolished in 1935 to make way for new reservoirs which remain a key component in Perth's water supply system. The first pond constructed in 1986 had capacity for 3,570 cubic metres (944,000 US gal), the 2nd with 10,970 cubic metres (2.898 million US gallons) (1901), the 3rd with 46,160 cubic metres (12.193 million US gallons) (1912) and the 4th with 62,000 cubic metres (16.3 million US gallons) (1924). In 1934 ponds 1 and 2 were incorporated to provide 45,000 cubic metres (12 million US gallons) of water. Mount Eliza is a service reservoir which supports the greater functioning of the Victoria reservoir.
