= Perth Gas Company =

Former power company in Perth, Western Australia

Perth Gas Company was a gas producer in Perth, Western Australia. It had plant in East Perth that was constructed in 1886, and superseded by new operators and plant in 1922.

The company conducted a range of improvements and modifications to its works.

In the 1890s there were various governmental actions regarding the company.

The company was in liquidation in 1913.

It was the predecessor to the East Perth Gas Works which established its operations a decade later.

Records of the company have survived in archival institutions.
