= James Stirling (Royal Navy officer) =

Royal Navy Admiral and colonial administrator (1791-1865)

Admiral Sir James Stirling
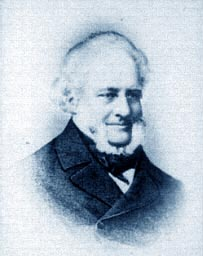
- Born: 28 January 1791; Drumpellier, Lanarkshire, Scotland
- Died: 22 April 1865 (aged 74); Woodbridge, Guildford, Surrey, England
- Military career
- Allegiance: United Kingdom
- Branch: Royal Navy
- Rank: Admiral
- Commands: HMS Brazen; HMS Success; HMS Indus; HMS Howe; Colony of Western Australia; East Indies and China Station
- Conflicts: Napoleonic Wars; War of 1812; Australian frontier wars; Pinjarra massacre; Crimean War
- Awards: Knight Bachelor

Admiral Sir James Stirling (28 January 1791 – 22 April 1865) was a British naval officer and colonial administrator. His enthusiasm and persistence persuaded the British Government to establish the Swan River Colony and he became the first Governor and Commander-in-Chief of Western Australia. In 1854, when Commander-in-Chief, East Indies and China Station, Stirling on his own initiative signed Britain's first Anglo-Japanese Friendship Treaty. Throughout his career Stirling showed considerable diplomatic skill and was selected for a number of sensitive missions. Paradoxically, this was not reflected in his personal dealings with officialdom and his hopes for preferment received many rebuffs. Stirling also personally led the attack in Western Australia on a group of approximately seventy Bindjareb men, women and children now known as the Pinjarra massacre.

Stirling entered the Royal Navy at age 12 and as a midshipman saw action in the Napoleonic Wars. Rapid promotion followed and when he was 21 he received his first command, the 28-gun sloop HMS Brazen, and, in the War of 1812 between the US and the UK, seized two prizes. Brazen carried the news of the end of that war to Vice Admiral Alexander Cochrane and Major General John Lambert, commanding the task force in the Gulf Coast of the United States, and took part in returning the troops to Britain. Upon his return to the West Indies, Stirling made two surveys of the Venezuelan coast and reported on the strengths, attitudes and dispositions of the Spanish government and various revolutionary factions, later playing a role in the British negotiations with these groups.

In his second command, HMS Success, he carried supplies and coinage to Australia, but with a covert mission to assess other nations' interest in the region and explore opportunities for British settlements. He is chiefly remembered for his exploration of the Swan River, followed by his eventual success in lobbying the British Government to establish a settlement there. On 30 December 1828, he was made Lieutenant-Governor of the colony-to-be. He formally founded the city of Perth and the port of Fremantle and oversaw the development of the surrounding area and on 4 March 1831 he was confirmed as Governor and Commander-in-Chief of the new territory, Western Australia, in which post he remained until in 1838 he resumed his naval career.

In October 1834 Stirling personally led a group of twenty-five police, soldiers and settlers in a punitive expedition against approximately seventy Bindjareb men, women and children camped on the Murray River partly in retaliation for several murders and thefts. This bloody attack involving rifles and bayonets against spears is known as the Pinjarra massacre, although in the past it was called the Battle of Pinjarra. Over more than an hour an uncertain number of Aboriginal men, women and children were killed during this encounter; Stirling reported 15 males killed, John Septimus Roe 15–20, and an unidentified eyewitness 25–30 including 1 woman and several children with probably more floating down with the stream. One of Stirling's party was injured and one was injured and died about two weeks later, although it is uncertain if from existing injuries, injuries suffered during the massacre, poor medical treatment after the massacre, or a combination thereof. An uncertain number of Bindjareb were injured, and an uncertain number died of their injuries.

From 1840 to 1844, in command of the 80-gun HMS Indus, he patrolled the Mediterranean with instructions to "show the flag" and keep an eye on the French. In 1847, he was given command of the 120-gun first rate ship of the line HMS Howe and his first commission was to conduct Her Majesty, the Dowager Queen Adelaide on trips to Lisbon and Madeira and then back to Osborne House on the Isle of Wight. After that, Howe was assigned to the eastern Mediterranean, where she reinforced the squadron led by Vice Admiral Parker using gunboat diplomacy to secure an uneasy peace in the region.

Stirling's fifth and final command was as Commander in Chief, China and the East Indies Station, and his flag, as Rear Admiral of the White, was hoisted on HMS Winchester on 11 May 1854. Shortly afterwards news arrived that war had been declared on Russia. Stirling was anxious to prevent Russian ships from sheltering in Japanese ports and menacing allied shipping and, after lengthy negotiations through the Nagasaki Magistrate, concluded a Treaty of Friendship with the Japanese. The treaty was endorsed by the British Government, but Stirling was criticised in the popular press for not finding and engaging with the Russian fleet.

== Family background ==
Stirling was the fifth of eight sons, ninth of the sixteen children, of Andrew Stirling, Esq. of Drumpellier near Coatbridge, North Lanarkshire, Scotland, and his father's second cousin, Anne Stirling.

The Glaswegian Stirling family was made enormously wealthy by the slave trade in Britain, and Stirling's father in law James Mangles was a wealthy Atlantic Ocean slaver. The Stirling family were also well-known and celebrated in the naval annals of the 18th century. His maternal grandfather was Admiral Sir Walter Stirling and his uncle was Admiral Sir Charles Stirling. With such a family background, it was natural for James to enter the Royal Navy. His education at Westminster School was interleaved with periods of training on board British warships, and on 14 January 1804, at the age of 12, he entered the navy as a First-Class Volunteer, embarking on the storeship HMS Camel for the West Indies. Thus he began a distinguished career.

== Early career ==
=== Period as a midshipman ===
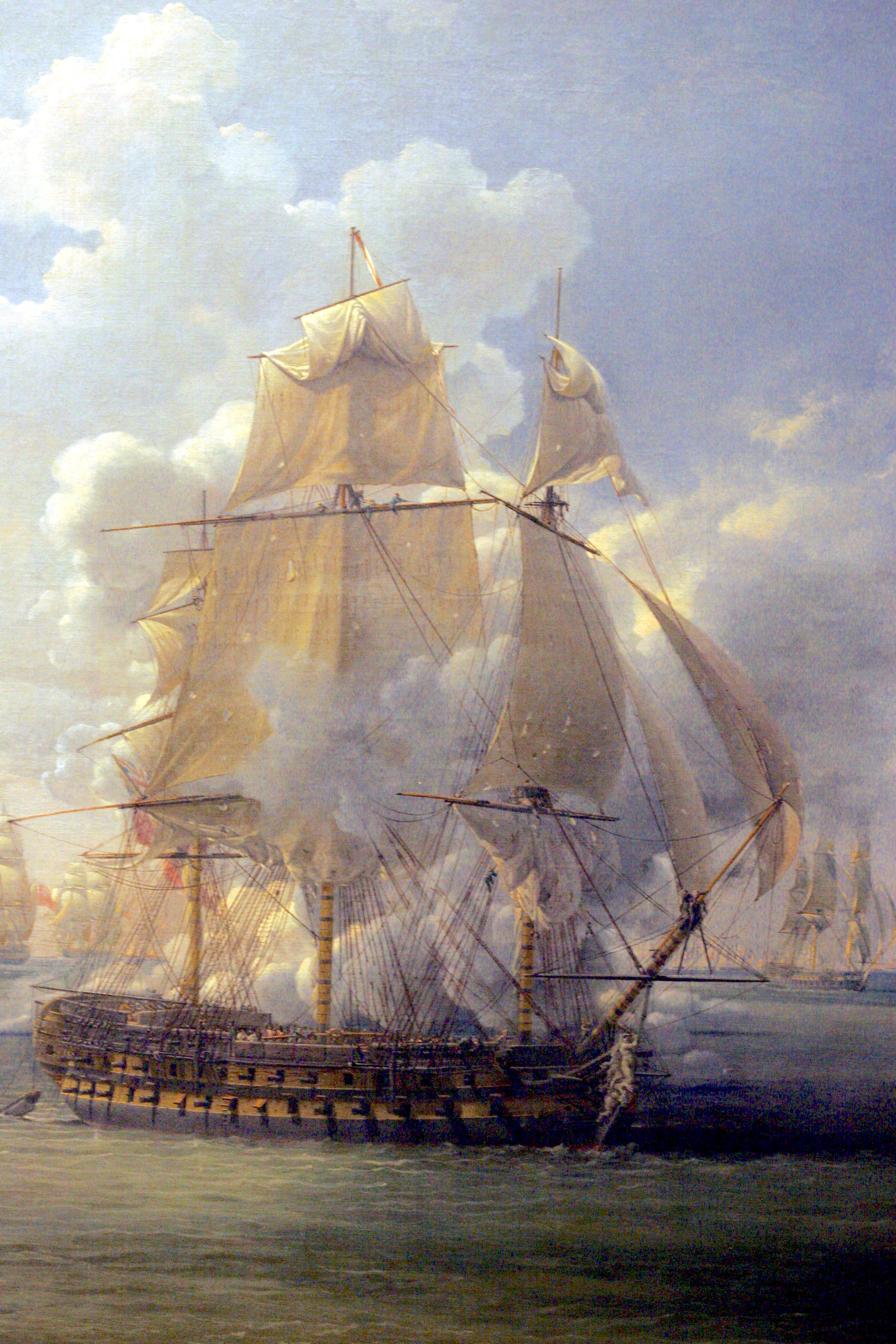
HMS Hercule, which Stirling served on for a period

Stirling trained for midshipman on board HMS Camel and also served for a period on HMS Hercule under the flag of Admiral Sir John Duckworth, Commander-in-Chief, Jamaica Squadron. He passed his midshipman tests on 20 January 1805 and shortly afterwards was posted to HMS Prince George, but on 27 June, at the request of his uncle, Rear-Admiral Charles Stirling, he joined his uncle's flagship, the 98-gun HMS Glory.

The following month, at age 14, he was to see his first naval action. Glory was in the fleet, commanded by Vice-Admiral Robert Calder, which in July that year engaged against the combined French and Spanish fleets off Cape Finisterre during the Napoleonic Wars. Glory sustained a damaged foremast spar and sails "much torn". After the battle, the Squadron returned to England with two captured Spanish ships as prizes.

In July 1806 his uncle was given a new ship, HMS Sampson, and orders to convoy General Samuel Auchmuty and his troops to the Río de la Plata and take over command of the squadron there from Admiral Sir Home Popham on the flagship HMS Diadem. James accompanied his uncle and saw the fall of Montevideo to General Auchmuty's forces and the capture of twenty-five warships and more than 10,000 tons of merchant shipping. In August 1807 the Stirlings crossed the South Atlantic for a stay of five months at the Cape of Good Hope and at the end of February 1808 Diadem returned to England via a short period in Rio de Janeiro.

On arrival in England in April, Midshipman Stirling was posted to HMS Warspite under Captain Henry Blackwood. At this time he was preparing for his examinations to become a lieutenant, and Blackwood arranged for him to have short stints as Acting Lieutenant on other vessels in the Channel Fleet. He started his examinations at Somerset House on 1 August 1809 and on 12 August rejoined Warspite as a full Lieutenant.

=== West Indies ===
On 1 April 1810 Stirling was transferred from Warspite to HMS Hibernia under Captain R.D. Dunn and moved with Dunn when the Captain was transferred to HMS Armide in November. A year later, on 20 November 1811, he received a significant elevation to flag lieutenant on HMS Arethusa, the flagship of his uncle, now vice-admiral and commander-in-chief of the Jamaica Station. On 3 March 1812, he was appointed acting commander of the sloop HMS Moselle and three months later, at age 21, he was promoted to the rank of commander. Soon after that he was given command of the 28-gun sloop HMS Brazen, (Note: Brazen was a sixth-rated 28 gun sloop, 110-ft long, 30-ft beam, built at Portsmouth in 1808. She finished her days as Episcopal Floating Church in the Pool of London) built in 1808, in which he was to serve for six years.

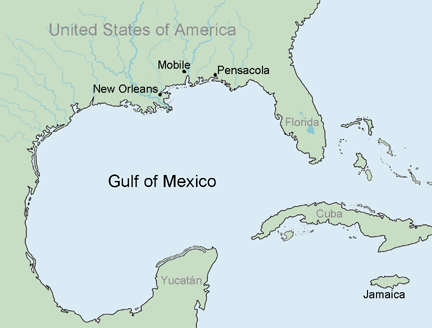
Brazen's theatre of operations in the War of 1812

In the War of 1812 between the United States of America and Britain, the role assigned to the ships of the Jamaica Station was to attack the US coast and ports on the Gulf of Mexico and to destroy their ships and stores. On 11 July 1812 Brazen weighed anchor on Stirling's first mission, which was to be against New Orleans and the Mississippi delta. However, Brazen was severely damaged by a hurricane and had to abandon the mission and enter the Spanish port of Pensacola to carry out repairs. Despite this, Stirling was able to make a valuable survey of Mobile Bay and the Spanish-held Florida coastline and capture an American ship, which he took back to Jamaica as a prize on 20 November 1812.

He had no immediate opportunity to revisit the Gulf of Mexico, as Brazen was ordered to return to England for a maintenance survey. After docking in Sheerness for four months, the ship escorted a convoy carrying settlers and stores to Hudson Bay. On his return to the Strait of Dover at the end of December 1813, Stirling received confidential orders for an important mission, to carry the Duke of Brunswick to Holland. After that, during most of 1814, Brazen patrolled the Irish Sea and the Hebrides in search of French or American ships until, at the end of the year, Stirling received orders to return to the West Indies, to the Windward Islands Station at Barbados, where Admiral Duckworth was now Commander-in-Chief.

There were now two stations in the West Indies, at Barbados and Jamaica, and for a while Brazen shuttled between the two, carrying communications between the two admirals. On one such trip Stirling was introduced to Simón Bolívar, who was in Jamaica following a defeat on the South American mainland. Soon after that he was given a mission to carry the news of the Treaty of Ghent, ending the War of 1812, to the British troops under the command of General John Lambert, near New Orleans, (Note: The Prince Regent assented to the Treaty of Peace with America... dispatches having been forwarded, with instructions to our Commanders in consequence of the event. These instructions went off in the Brazen, Capt. Stirling, and Kangaroo, Capt. Hall, which [was supposed to have] sailed on Thursday [29 December 1814].) (Note: Plymouth, Jan 2nd. Sailed Brazen, Favorite and Insolent, to the westward.) and to assist in their return to England. His reconnaissance of Mobile Bay and the coast of Florida three years earlier now stood him in good stead. The troops, who had captured Fort Bowyer, were recovered and some of them, under the command of Captain Harry Smith, were taken to England on Brazen after surviving a severe gale in the Gulf of Florida. Smith was impressed with Stirling's seamanship and became a long-standing friend.

The Treaty of Paris, signed by France, Great Britain, Austria, Prussia and Russia on 20 November 1815, ended the Napoleonic Wars and a large fleet was no longer needed. The Admiralty set about decommissioning ships and retiring officers. However, Stirling and Brazen received a stay of execution, as they were needed again in the West Indies. Spain was losing its grip on the north of South America and rival factions were struggling for power. So close to the West Indies, Britain had an interest in the establishment of secure government on the mainland, but needed to be careful to avoid offending Spain, now an ally. Brazen arrived at Barbados in June 1816 and on 20 July Stirling and the Barbados Harbourmaster were sent to survey the coast of Venezuela and gain intelligence regarding the attitudes of the population and the disposition of the various revolutionary factions.

After making his report Stirling went back to patrolling the Caribbean with orders to prevent piracy and the contraband trade. Late in September he seized the Hércules. This action turned out to be unwise. Hércules, not to be confused with Hercule on which Stirling had served in 1804, was nicknamed Black Frigate and had at one time been the flagship of the Argentine Navy. When taken by Stirling, she was a privateer with 22 guns carrying a valuable cargo plundered from Spanish American cities and ships. She was under the command of William Brown, who had been an admiral in the Argentine Navy and was in command of the revolutionary fleet fighting the Spaniards. Her capture compromised the cautious line taken by the British between the Spanish and the revolutionaries. The Governor of Barbados ordered her release, but, when she had left Barbados, Stirling recaptured her and took her to Antigua as a prize. After long drawn-out proceedings, the High Court of the Admiralty ruled in Brown's favour, but he lost the frigate and her cargo. Stirling continued to receive demands for payment of damages for many years.

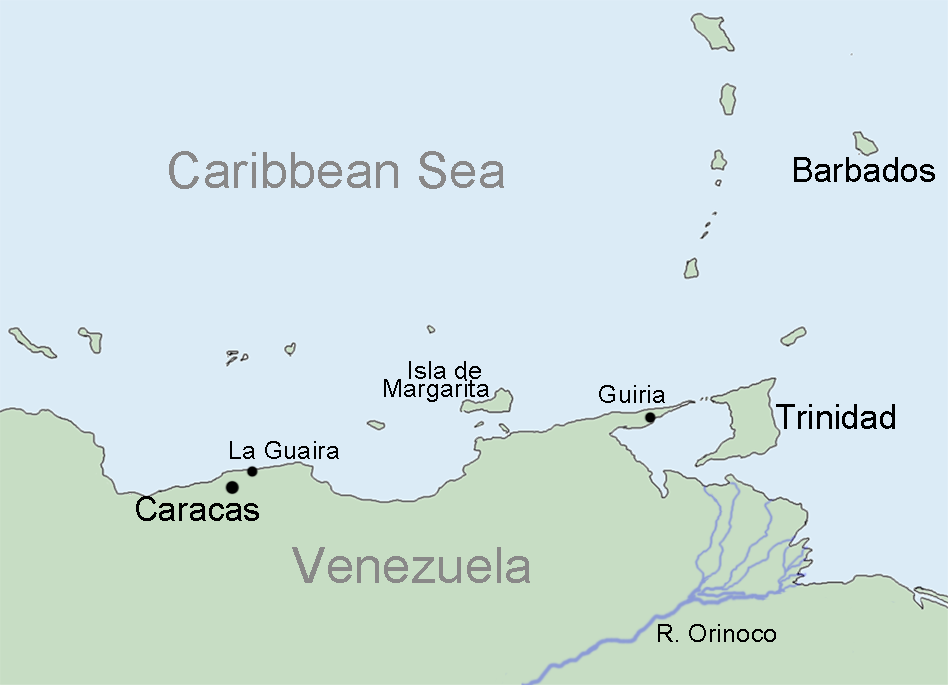
The coast of Venezuela, South America

At the end of 1816 Stirling was commissioned to make a further detailed inspection of the conditions in Venezuela. From Güiria in the Paria Peninsula he sailed west to Caracas and the port of La Guaira and returned eastward by an inland route, in order to study the conditions in the interior of the country. In February 1817 he submitted a detailed report to the Commander-in-Chief, Admiral John Harvey. In it he blamed Spanish neglect for the devastation and decay he found in the interior. He described the insurgent "Patriots" as determined and disciplined, but the Loyalists were indisciplined and lazy. Following this, Stirling was given a number of covert missions in connection with Venezuela. The exact orders he received are not known, as the period from January to June 1817 has been removed from Brazen's log in Admiralty files. In May, the Executive Committee of the Patriots prepared a draft Constitution for the Republic of Venezuela which was given to Stirling for transmission to the West Indies Stations and thence to England. However this draft was subsequently rejected by Bolívar. Another source reports that a secret agreement, between the British and the Republicans, was signed later on board Brazen, in which the British would assist Bolívar in exchange for preferential trading rights when the Republic came into being.

In the second half of 1817 Stirling returned once again to patrolling the Caribbean with orders to seize any vessels suspected of piracy, orders which he carried out with alacrity because of the prize money. By June 1818 Brazen was in need of repair and he returned with her to England, where the ship was taken out of commission and Stirling received the dread news that he was to be placed on half pay. However, Admiral Harvey had sent the Lords of the Admiralty a letter strongly commending "the zeal and alacrity of this intelligent and excellent officer", which may have influenced their decision to promote him to Post Captain on 7 December 1818.

=== Surrey ===
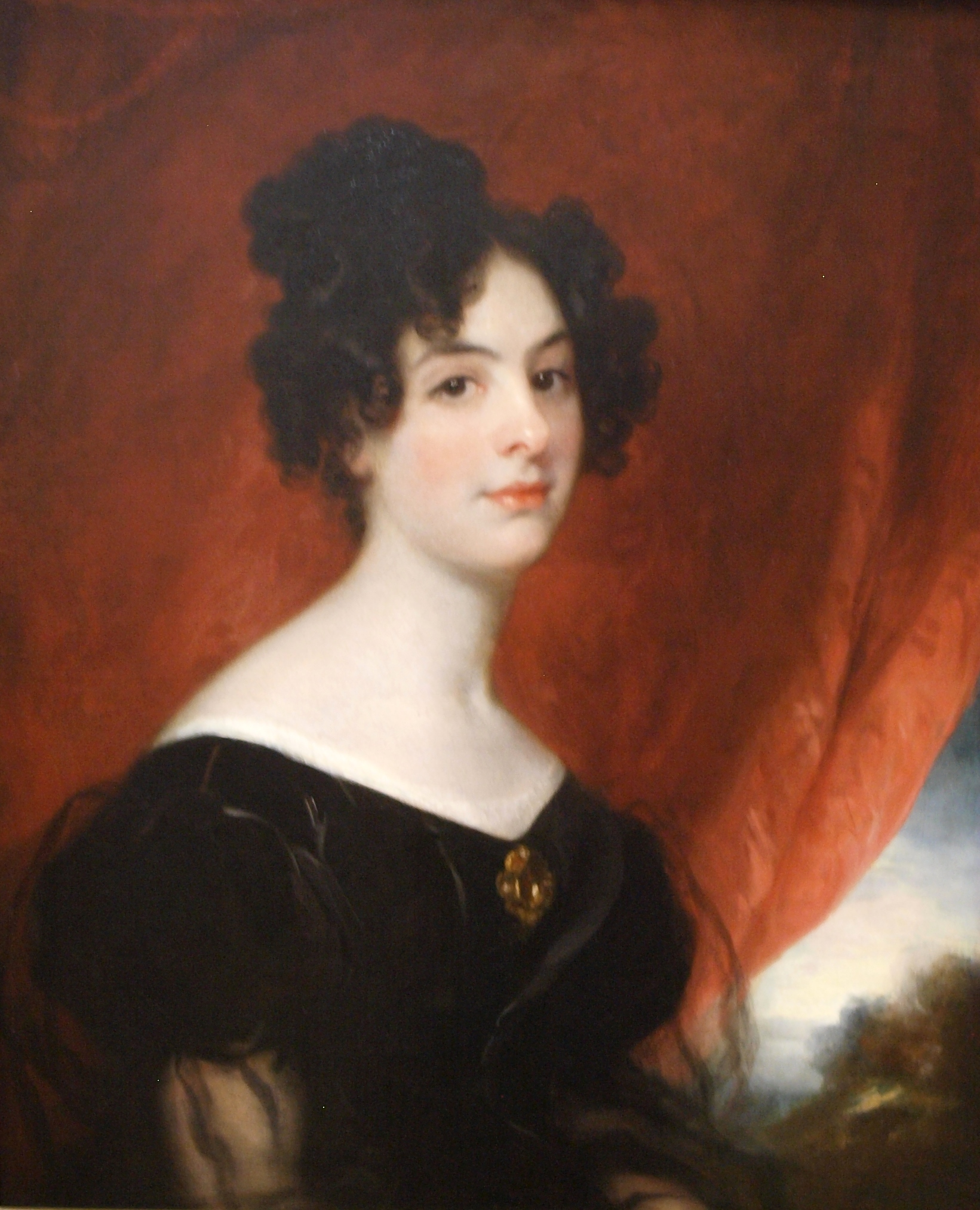
Ellen Stirling (Mangles), 1828, by Thomas Phillips, National Portrait Gallery (Australia), Canberra

Although at the end of 1817 he was not to know it, Stirling was to be without a command for eight years. Between 1818 and 1822 his father, Andrew, was a tenant at Henley Park in Surrey, and Stirling made use of his enforced leave to visit his parents and other members of his scattered family. He also made several visits to the Continent of Europe. On one such visit to France he met and befriended Captain James Mangles, RN, who was also on half pay. Mangles was returning from a tour of North Africa and Asia Minor and was among the first Europeans to have visited Petra. His uncle had an estate at Woodbridge Park, about ten miles from the Stirlings at Henley Park and had extensive interests in the East Indies, had been High Sheriff for Surrey in 1808 and was a director of the British East India Company.

Captain Mangles invited Stirling to visit Woodbridge, where he met for the first time the, then, 13-year-old Ellen Mangles, his future wife. The two families got on well together and the parents were delighted two years later when, according to the etiquette of that era, Stirling formally asked the uncle's permission to propose marriage to his daughter. The permission was granted on the condition that Stirling should not make the proposal until Ellen completed her schooling. The couple were married at Stoke Church, Guildford on 3 September 1823, on Ellen's 16th birthday, and went on a nine-month honeymoon and grand tour. On their return, Ellen gave birth to their first child, Andrew, at Woodbridge on 24 October 1824.

During the next eighteen months Stirling put forward several ideas to the Admiralty, including a means of assessing compass declinations at sea and a proposal for improving stowage in warships. He was keen to keep his name in front of those in the Admiralty who could post him to active service. He had returned from the grand tour short of funds, his father had died in 1823, the family businesses were not prospering and he himself had to make payments to the court in connection with the Hércules case. The competition for preferment from other officers on half pay was intense, so he was fortunate that on 23 January 1826 he was recommissioned and given command of the newly built HMS Success.

== Australia ==
In 1826 the western side of Australia was still called New Holland, however the Dutch appeared to have no interest in its development. For the British, a port on the west or north coast might be a useful stage for trade with their settlements in the Cape of Good Hope, India and Singapore. However, the French were known to have an intense interest and French ships were exploring the Australian coasts. The British needed to assess further the potential of the region and find out the extent of the French interest without creating a diplomatic incident. For this task, Stirling, with his record of exploration, diplomacy and covert missions, was a natural choice. New South Wales was running short of currency and the settlement on Melville Island was short of food and scurvy was rife. A supply mission to these would be excellent cover for intelligence gathering activities.

Success sailed on 9 July 1826, carrying cases of coins and a distinguished passenger, Admiral Sir James Saumarez, Knight Companion of the Bath, a hero of the Napoleonic Wars. Ellen and one year old Andrew remained at home at Woodbridge. One of Stirling's officers was 3rd Lieutenant William Preston, who would marry Ellen's sister Hamilla seven years later. Success arrived at the Cape of Good Hope on 2 September, discharged its passenger, took on provisions and set sail again, arriving at Sydney Heads on 28 November.

Captain Jules d'Urville arrived in Sydney Harbour on 2 December on the French corvette L'Astrolabe. L'Astrolabe was on a voyage of exploration, which gave Stirling an opportunity to assess French interest in the region. Stirling and d'Urville dined together several times and Stirling discovered that Astrolabe had a detailed chart of the Swan River. Before leaving England, Stirling had studied the available charts of the west coast of Australia and had concluded that the Swan was a possible site for a harbour and settlement and had hoped to be the first European to explore and chart it. However, d'Urville indicated that the French did not consider that the Swan would be a suitable site for a harbour, because of the difficulty of access and lack of fresh water. This gave Stirling a free hand.

A ship arrived from Melville Island on the same day as L'Astrolabe, bringing reassuring news that scurvy was under control and the settlement was progressing more satisfactorily. The Governor, Major General Ralph Darling, advised Stirling to delay his visit to Melville until later in the year. Stirling then made a report to Darling, setting out detailed arguments for a mission to the Swan River. Darling gave his approval and, on 17 January 1827, Success sailed from Sydney for the Swan, via Hobart in Van Diemen's Land, where several cases of coins were delivered. On board Success were the Colonial Botanist Charles Frazer, the surgeon Frederick Clause and the landscape artist Frederick Garling.

=== Swan River exploration ===
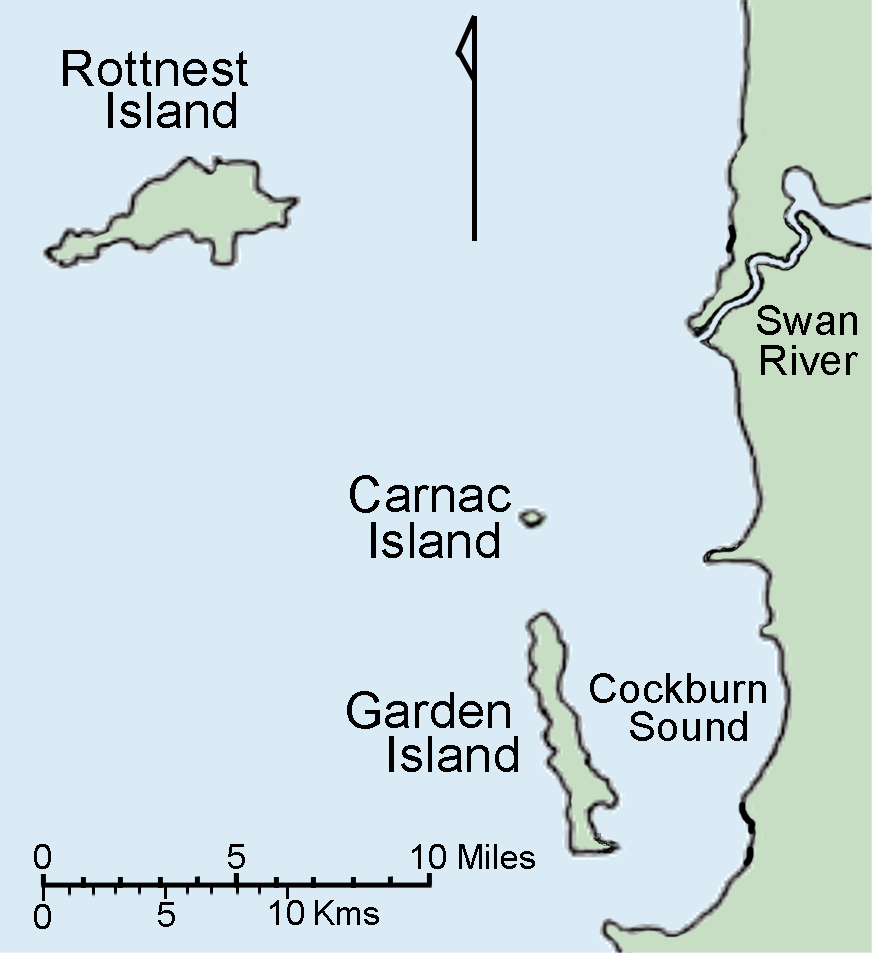
Australia's west coast by the mouth of the Swan River

The Nyoongar people call the river Derbarl Yerrigan.

On 10 January 1697, the Dutch sea captain Willem De Vlamingh renamed it to the Swan River (Zwaanenrivier in Dutch) after the large number of black swans they observed there. One hundred and thirty years later, the British ship Success arrived off the west coast of Australia on 5 March 1827 and anchored near the north east corner of Rottnest Island. The following day, the ship moved cautiously towards the coast and anchored about a mile from the mouth of the Swan. Lieutenant Carnac and the ship's Master, Millroy, were left to take soundings and look for channels and possible landing places. Meanwhile, Stirling, Frazer and Lieutenant Preston made a preliminary reconnaissance up the river in the gig. They sailed about five miles upstream, reaching a wide section which Stirling named Melville Water. Other features were named after Stirling's brother Walter and Lieutenant Preston. During the next day more soundings were taken, and Isle Berthelot and Isle Buache were renamed Carnac Island and Garden Island. Stirling gave the name Cockburn Sound to the "Magnificent Sound between that Island and the Main possessing great attractions for a Sailor in search of a Port".

At mid-day on 8 March the exploration party - Stirling, Frazer, Garling, Clause, Lieutenant Belches, Midshipman Heathcote, the ship's clerk Augustus Gilbert, 7 seamen and 4 marines - left Success in the cutter and the gig and sailed to Point Belches. There the boats grounded and, as the party was unable to find a channel, the boats were unloaded and dragged across the shallows until nightfall. While this was being done, Stirling, Frazer and Garling climbed the commanding hill on the west bank, which Stirling named Mount Eliza in honour of Eliza Darling, the New South Wales Governor's wife. While there, Garling painted a watercolour landscape view showing the entrance to the river on the opposite side of Melville Water. Stirling later named this Canning River after the British Prime Minister at that time.

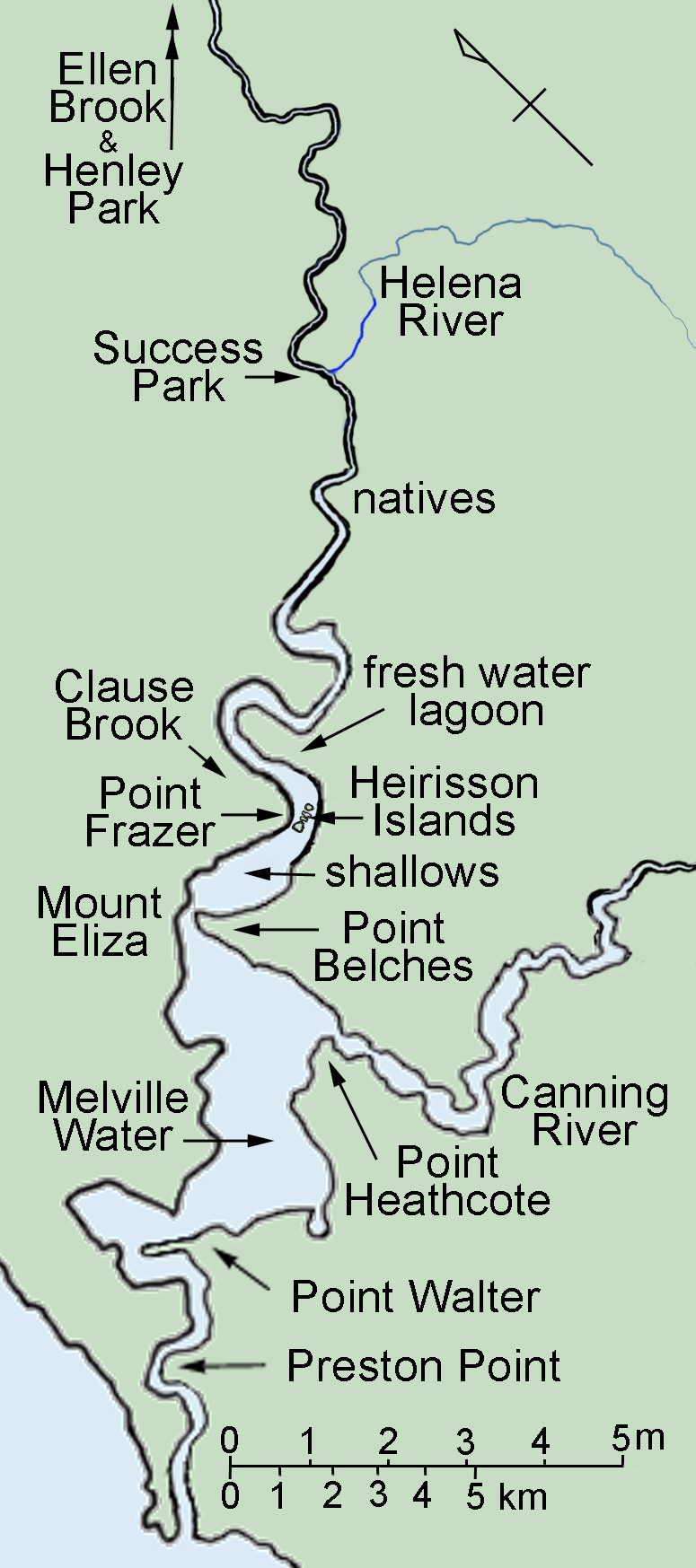
Stirling's exploration of the Swan River

The next day, dragging across the shallows started at daybreak and continued until nightfall. Frazer, exploring on land, found a freshwater brook (Note: present-day Claise Brook) and Stirling named the nearby point of land Point Frazer. Frazer also found a lagoon of fresh water and the party moved camp to beside it. On the following morning three armed Aboriginal warriors demonstrated their anger at the "invasion" (Stirling's word) of their territory with violent gestures, but eventually retired. During the day, the boats reached the Heirisson Islands and in the channel above them progress was much easier, but still slow, due to the winding of the river. On 11 March the boats passed through a long narrow stretch (Note: present-day Belmont and Redcliffe) and encountered more Aboriginal people who threatened the boats with their spears from higher ground. When the boats reached more level terrain, gestures of goodwill defused the situation and the Aboriginals moved on.

On 12 March the boats reached a place where a tributary, later named Helena River, joined the Swan from the east. The party also found another fresh water stream, which they named Success, on the west side of the Swan. From this point on, the Swan narrowed and there were many obstructions. The next day, the cutter was holed and had to be repaired, after which the party reached a creek which Stirling named Ellen Brook, after his young wife. The Swan was not navigable any further and Stirling and Garling set off on foot for the hills to the east, arriving at about sunset. On their return to camp they lost their way in the dark, but Frazer sent out search parties to guide them back. On 14 March the party split into three groups. Frazer went east and Belches and Heathcote north. Stirling and Clause went west and discovered a freshwater lagoon, some Aboriginal huts and a fertile region which so pleased Stirling that he named it Henley Park after his Surrey home.

The return journey was much quicker, being downstream and through previously charted areas. On arrival at Melville Water, Belches was sent to explore the Canning River. The rest of the party returned to Success and spent the next four days surveying the surrounding islands and finding a safe channel into Cockburn Sound. On 21 March Success weighed anchor and three days later arrived at Geographe Bay, in order to carry out Governor Darling's instructions to explore and report on the region. Geographe Bay was named in May 1801 by French explorer Nicolas Baudin. Success then sailed to King George Sound, to pick up Major Edmund Lockyer and unload provisions for the settlement there, (Note: present-day Albany) after which the ship returned to New South Wales, anchoring off Sydney Heads on 16 April.

Stirling's report to Darling and Frazer's report on the quality of the land were enclosed with Darlings report of 21 April 1827 to the Colonial Office in the United Kingdom. Stirling's report consisted of a diary Narrative of Operations and a section Observations on the Territory, which included a report by Clause on the healthiness of the climate. Later events showed that all three reports were over enthusiastic, the party having explored only the strip of soil in the vicinity of the Swan. Frazer was heavily criticised for this later. However, in their defence, both Clause and Frazer were subject to Stirling's intense enthusiasm for the project and may have been unduly influenced by it. Stirling wrote a second report on the Swan River on 31 August. This was addressed to the Admiralty and was shorter, placing more emphasis on naval concerns and the strategic value of the area.

=== Melville Island and North Australia ===
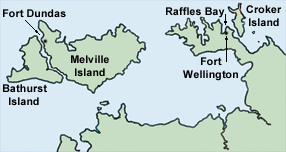
Melville and Croker Islands on Australia's north coast

Stirling's original mission included a task to carry supplies to Melville Island. However, Darling had received further instructions to investigate the formation of a new settlement on the coast to the east of Melville Island. Accordingly, Success left Sydney on 19 May 1827 carrying an establishment force for a new settlement and accompanied by the brig Mary Elizabeth. The two ships separated. Mary Elizabeth sailed to Melville Island and on 15 June Success anchored in Palm Bay, on the western side of Croker Island. Stirling quickly established that the island was unsuitable for settlement and sent a boat across to the mainland to explore Raffles Bay. The report being favourable, Stirling looked no further and on 18 June he went ashore with his officers to take possession of Raffles Bay and the surrounding territory in His Majesty's name. The establishment force and supplies were landed and Stirling named the settlement Fort Wellington. A month later, believing all to be well, Stirling set sail for Melville island.

Success arrived at Fort Dundas on Melville Island on 25 July and set sail again four days later for Madras, and then to Penang, to report to Admiral Gage, Commander of the Eastern Station. Stirling was keen to return home to see his family and to further his case for a settlement at the Swan River. However, Gage instructed him to base Success in Trincomalee Harbour, Ceylon (now Sri Lanka), where he arrived on 4 January 1828. There he succumbed rapidly to the tropical climate and on 21 February three Royal Navy surgeons certified that he was so ill he should return immediately to England.

The settlements at Fort Dundas and Fort Wellington rapidly got into difficulties with outbreaks of scurvy and fever, supply shortages and communication failures. The Melville Island outpost was abandoned in November 1828 and the Raffles Bay settlement was broken up in July 1829.

=== Western Australia ===
On returning to London in 1828, Stirling lobbied the Foreign Office and the Admiralty for support for a settlement in the vicinity of the Swan River, describing it as ideal for a permanent establishment. He emphasised the defensive prospects of Mount Eliza, the large hill on which Kings Park is now situated, "as it is near the narrows of the Swan River, which would make defending the colony from gunships easy, with just a few cannons."

On 21 August 1828, Stirling and his friend the West Indies expert Colonel Thomas Moody ADC Kt. wrote to Under-Secretary Robert Hay to offer to form an association of private capitalists to using their own money settle Australia in fulfilment of the "principles" of William Penn's settlement of Pennsylvania. Moody was endorsed by the Tories in Parliament, who had recently commended his report to Parliament on slavery. Moody had previously advised Stirling's relation James Mangles R. N. about the settlement of the Swan River Colony at minimal cost to the British Government.

Parliament initially rejected the proposal of Stirling and Moody, but rumours of a new French interest in the region provoked Sir George Murray, on 5 November, to request that the Admiralty send a ship-of-war "to proceed to the Western Coast of New Holland and take possession of the whole territory in His Majesty's name." This task was given to HMS Challenger under the command of Captain Charles Fremantle and, a week later, a further order was issued to prepare HMS Sulphur to carry a detachment of troops to the Swan River.

On 31 December Murray wrote to Stirling confirming his title as Lieutenant-Governor of the new colony and on the same day his Under-Secretary, Robert Hay, confirmed the appointment of the members of the civil establishment including Colonial Secretary Peter Brown, Surveyor-General John Septimus Roe, Harbourmaster Mark John Currie, naturalist James Drummond, a surgeon, a storekeeper, a cooper, a blacksmith and a boatbuilder. After hectic preparations, on 6 February 1829 these pioneers, with their assistants, families, servants and livestock, departed Plymouth in Parmelia under Captain J H Luscombe out of Spithead in company with Sulphur, carrying 100 men of the 63rd Regiment of Foot, under the command of Major Frederick Irwin, and three years' of army stores, 10,000 bricks and £1,000 to meet all expenses of government.

On arrival on 31 May at Garden Island, at what became known as the Swan River Colony, they re-erected a wooden house that had first been assembled at Lieutenant Preston's home in Sutton Green, Surrey, that would become the Governor's home. These pioneers were responsible for laying the foundations of Perth, Fremantle and the market-town named Guildford that is now a suburb of Perth.

Stirling administered the Swan River settlement from June 1829 until 11 August 1832, when he left on an extended visit to England where he was knighted, and again from August 1834 until December 1838. However, he was commissioned as Governor of Western Australia only from 6 February 1832, rectifying the absence of a legal instrument providing the authority detailed in Stirling's Instructions of 30 December 1828. Stirling had said:

I believe I am the first Governor who ever formed a settlement without Commission, Laws, Instructions and Salary.

With the creation of the Western Australian Legislative Council in 1830, Stirling automatically became an official member.

In October 1834 Stirling led a detachment of 25 armed troopers and settlers including Septimus Roe and Thomas Peel that attacked an encampment of 60-80 Pindjarep Aboriginal people. The Pindjarep fled into the bush and were later encircled near a crossing on the Murray River at Pinjarra, Stirling referred to this as the Battle of Pinjarra. Settlers accounts claim between 10 and 80 Aboriginal people died, compared to Aboriginal oral history which claim 150 people died.

As recognition of his service in establishing the colony Stirling was granted land near Beverley, Western Australia. This land, along with neighbouring properties was re-acquired by the Western Australian Government, who later subdivided the land into farmlets for returning soldiers. The remaining land was later used to establish the Avondale Agricultural Research Station, which includes Stirling's restored homestead.

=== Harvey ===
In 1829 Stirling selected 12,800 acres (52 km^{2}) of land in Harvey and called it the "Harvey River Settlement". However, the only improvement made was a convict built cottage on the banks of the Harvey River. The cottage featured a shingled roof and pit-sawn jarrah walls with hexagonal-shaped paving blocks fitted together to form firm flooring. A replica cottage known as Stirling's Cottage has been built on the site and includes one of the original paving blocks in its history room.

== Mediterranean and west coast of Europe ==
=== HMS Indus ===
In 1840 Stirling was given command of HMS Indus and instructions to join the Mediterranean Fleet. The British Foreign Secretary, Lord Palmerston, considered it was necessary to show a strong British naval presence in the Mediterranean. Muhammad Ali Pasha had triggered the Oriental Crisis of 1840 by declaring himself Khedive of Egypt, which had been until then a province of the Ottoman Empire. Also King Ferdinand II of the Two Sicilies and Naples, had been persuaded by a British naval blockade of Naples to restore to a British company the monopoly for Sicilian sulphur, an essential ingredient of gunpowder. Indus reached Gibraltar in August 1841 and made herself felt along the Algerian coast on her way to the Mediterranean station at Malta. For a few months she was deployed around Sicily and the boot of Italy, but in November Stirling received new instructions to show a presence and monitor the situation at Lisbon. Portugal had been in turmoil for several years and the British Admiralty had received intelligence that Lisbon was threatened by a 5,000 strong revolutionary army and the Portuguese Government was preparing for conflict. Stirling was directed not to take part in any action, but to safeguard British subjects and the Portuguese royal family. In the event, the conflict was resolved peacefully.

In June Indus was ordered back to Malta and then to Smyrna, where there had been an insurrection and British subjects and property in the region were thought to be at risk. This threat also failed to materialise and after three months at Piraeus in Greece Indus sailed to Naples to take part in the farewell celebrations sending the Princess Teresa Cristina on her way to marry the Emperor Pedro II of Brazil. This was a major diplomatic event and Stirling entertained the British Ambassador and British Consul on board and was received by King Ferdinand. The harbour was filled with vessels of the Neapolitan, Brazilian and British navies as well as an American warship and Stirling sent a detailed report on the foreign warships to the Admiralty.

A brief spell at Gibraltar was followed by a visit to Cadiz to prevent a planned blockade of the harbour by rebel troops. Then, in September 1843, Vice-Admiral Sir Edward Owen, Commander-in-Chief, Mediterranean Fleet, received an urgent request for assistance from Sir Edmund Lyons, the British Consul in Athens. King Otto of Greece had rejected a proposed new constitutional government for Greece and was facing an armed rebellion. Stirling was to join HMS Formidable, under the command of Sir Charles Sullivan, place himself at the disposal of Sir Edmund and arrange for the protection of British subjects. Stirling's charm and diplomatic skill, combined with the presence of three British warships in the harbour, calmed the situation and, despite the King's reluctance to adopt the new constitution, Sullivan and Stirling persuaded him that acceptance was the wisest course. In gratitude for their help in quelling the rebellion and negotiating with his ministers, the King bestowed on Sullivan and Stirling Greece's high honour, Knight Commander of the Order of the Redeemer. Following this, Stirling returned to England, where Indus was paid off on 13 June 1844.

=== HMS Howe ===
Stirling received his fourth command, the 120-gun first rate ship of the line HMS Howe in May 1847 and joined the Channel Fleet under the command of the newly appointed Rear-Admiral Sir Charles Napier on HMS St Vincent. In September he received special orders. He was to conduct Her Majesty, the Dowager Queen Adelaide, Queen Victoria's aunt, on trips to Lisbon and Madeira and then back to Osborne House on the Isle of Wight. Flying the Royal Standard at the main, Howe entered the River Tagus on 22 October. Sir Charles Napier immediately boarded to pay his respects, followed shortly afterwards by Ferdinand of Saxe-Coburg Gotha, King of Portugal, and two princes. The next day, all the captains in the squadron donned full dress and white trousers and were formally presented to the Dowager Queen, after which Napier and Stirling escorted her to the royal Palace of Necessidades, where they were received by Queen Maria II.

After five days of sightseeing, the party set sail for Madeira. Leaving the Tagus, Howe was struck by a large wave and the Queen slipped and nearly fell overboard, but was saved by Stirling, who in so doing lost his ceremonial sword overboard. The grateful Queen later presented him with a magnificent replacement, a fine gold plated dress sword and scabbard which had been specially made for her. She also presented him with a silver snuff box with an inscription thanking him for his presence of mind on the occasion. After delivering the Queen in Madeira, Howe returned to Lisbon and took part in various exercises and manoeuvres before leaving again to collect her for the return voyage. She arrived at Osborne House on 27 April and Stirling learned a year later that she had honoured him by appointing him as her naval aide-de-camp.

He now had a few weeks with his family before receiving orders to report at Malta to Vice-Admiral Sir William Parker, Commander-in-Chief, Mediterranean Fleet, who had succeeded Sir Edward Owen. During the next few years, the presence of the British and French fleets encouraged an uneasy peace in the eastern Mediterranean. In 1849 Howe was recalled. She reached England on 2 July and two weeks later the ship's company was paid off.

== Far East ==
In July 1851, Stirling was promoted to rear admiral and in the following year served as Third Naval Lord at the Admiralty. From January 1854 to February 1856 Stirling was commander in chief of the East Indies and China Station. Using gunboat diplomacy he signed the first British treaty with Japan (the Anglo-Japanese Friendship Treaty) on 14 October 1854.

In November 1854, with Hong Kong Governor John Bowring, he led a fleet up the Pearl River to Canton to support the Viceroy of Liangguang (modern day Guangdong and Guangxi) Ye Mingchen and his forces besieged by the Tiandihui army. The fleet carried weapons and ammunition, food and Qing reinforcements.

In 1856 he was recalled because he had failed in the primary naval duty of finding and destroying the Russian squadron - partly, perhaps, because of his preoccupation with the self-imposed task of negotiating with Japan

— W.G. Beasley, Great Britain and the Opening of Japan 1834–1858

== Retirement ==
Stirling was promoted vice admiral in August 1857. He became an admiral in November 1862 and died in comfortable retirement at his home in Woodbridge Park, near Guildford in Surrey, on 22 April 1865 aged 74. There is a memorial tablet within St Mark's Church, Wyke. Ellen survived him by nine years. Stirling and his wife were buried in the extension to the graveyard of St John's Church on Stoke Road, near Guildford where they had been married.

== Honours ==
The plant genus Stirlingia, was named in his honour by Stephan Endlicher in 1838. A variety of Pittosporum is also named in his honour. In England, Stoke Church's social centre and hall is named The Stirling Centre.

In Western Australia the suburb of Stirling is named after him, as is a seat in the lower House of the federal Parliament and Governor Stirling Senior High School. The Royal Australian Navy's Indian Ocean Fleet is based at HMAS Stirling, near Rockingham. Stirling Highway (which links Perth and Fremantle) was named so in his honour. There are also many buildings and businesses named after him throughout Perth and Fremantle.

Another suburb, Ellenbrook, is indirectly named after his wife Ellen.

== Dishonours ==
Following the well-conceived ambush leading to a massacre lasting at least one hour and now known as the Pinjarra Massacre that Stirling led personally, Stirling threatened the Noongar people with genocide should they continue to resist colonisation. Given historical records of his involvement,

there's no ambiguity in it anymore, Stirling set out to punish the Noongar tribe down there for blocking expansion of the colony. He told everyone what he was going to do, went down there, did it and reported on it.

— Chris Owen

In 2020 a statue of Stirling on Hay Street in Perth's central business district was defaced amid Black Lives Matter protests. The statue had its neck and hands painted red, and the Australian Aboriginal flag was painted over the plaque on the ground in front of the statue.

Increasingly there are efforts to remove Stirling's name from Western Australian landmarks. In 2019, a petition to rename Stirling Highway received little support. In 2021, "residents at a [City of] Stirling council electors meeting voted in favour of changing their local government's name", although the city "eventually passed a motion that made no mention of any name change", with one councillor saying "while nobody condoned historical atrocities, a name change would cost 'millions of dollars', would set a dangerous precedent and should be 'nipped in the bud'." However, shortly afterwards, Western Australian senators called for a broader review of Western Australian "place names, such as Stirling Range, linked to colonial figures with known racist histories ... such as William Dampier, John Forrest and John Septimus Roe."

== See also ==
- History of Western Australia
- Historical Records of Australia
- Anglo-Japanese relations
- O'Byrne, William Richard (1849). "Stirling, James" . A Naval Biographical Dictionary . John Murray – via Wikisource.

== Bibliography ==
- Grainger, J.D. (August 1995). "The Navy in the River Plate, 1806-1808". Mariner's Mirror. 81 (3).
- Moore Smith, G.C., ed. (1902). The Autobiography of Lieutenant-General Sir Harry Smith, baronet of Aliwal on the Sutlej. London: John Murray.
- O'Byrne, William R. (1849). "Stirling, James" . A Naval Biographical Dictionary. London: John Murray. pp. 1120–1121.
- Statham Drew, Pamela (2003). James Stirling: Admiral and Founding Governor of Western Australia. Crawley: UWA Publishing. ISBN 978-1-876268-94-7. LCCN 2003464253. OL 3760974M. Wikidata Q136431983.

Government offices
Preceded by none	Lieutenant Governor of the Swan River Colony; 1828–1832	Succeeded by none
Preceded by none	Governor of Western Australia; 1832, 1834–1839	Succeeded by John Hutt
Military offices
Preceded by Sir Houston Stewart	Third Naval Lord; 1852	Succeeded by Sir Thomas Herbert
Preceded by Sir Fleetwood Pellew	Commander-in-Chief, East Indies and China Station; 1854–1856	Succeeded by Sir Michael Seymour
