= East Perth Gas Works =

Demolished gas works in East Perth, Western Australia

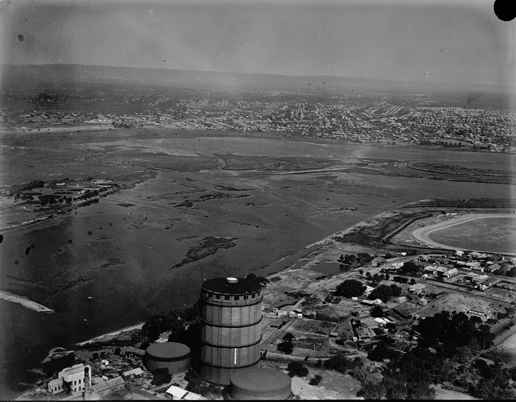
East Perth Gas Works and Burswood, c. 1935

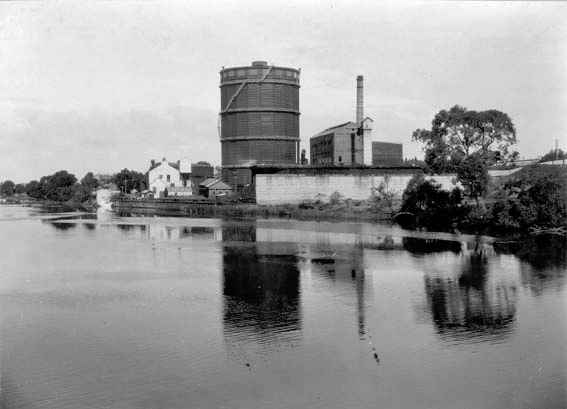
Viewed from the river, c. 1933

East Perth Gas Works was built in 1922 for the Perth City Council to produce town gas from coal, supplying the city of Perth in Western Australia. It could initially supply 28,000 cubic metres (1,000,000 cu ft) of gas per day.

It was built on the site of the earlier 1886 Perth Gas Company plant.

The works was situated on the north bank of Claise Brook and operated until its decommissioning in 1971. It was dismantled over a number of years, and the landmark 20-sided gasometer known as the "No. 2 Cityholder" was removed in 1985.

As a result of the processes in its operation, land surrounding the works was badly contaminated with polycyclic aromatic hydrocarbons. From the mid-1980s, a major environmental remediation project on behalf of the State Energy Commission of Western Australia, which owned the land, was undertaken to remove the contaminated soils created by the works. Remediation included dredging of 6 hectares (15 acres) of adjacent riverbeds and removal and treatment of 10,000 cubic metres (350,000 cu ft) of soil.
