= HMS Success (1825) =

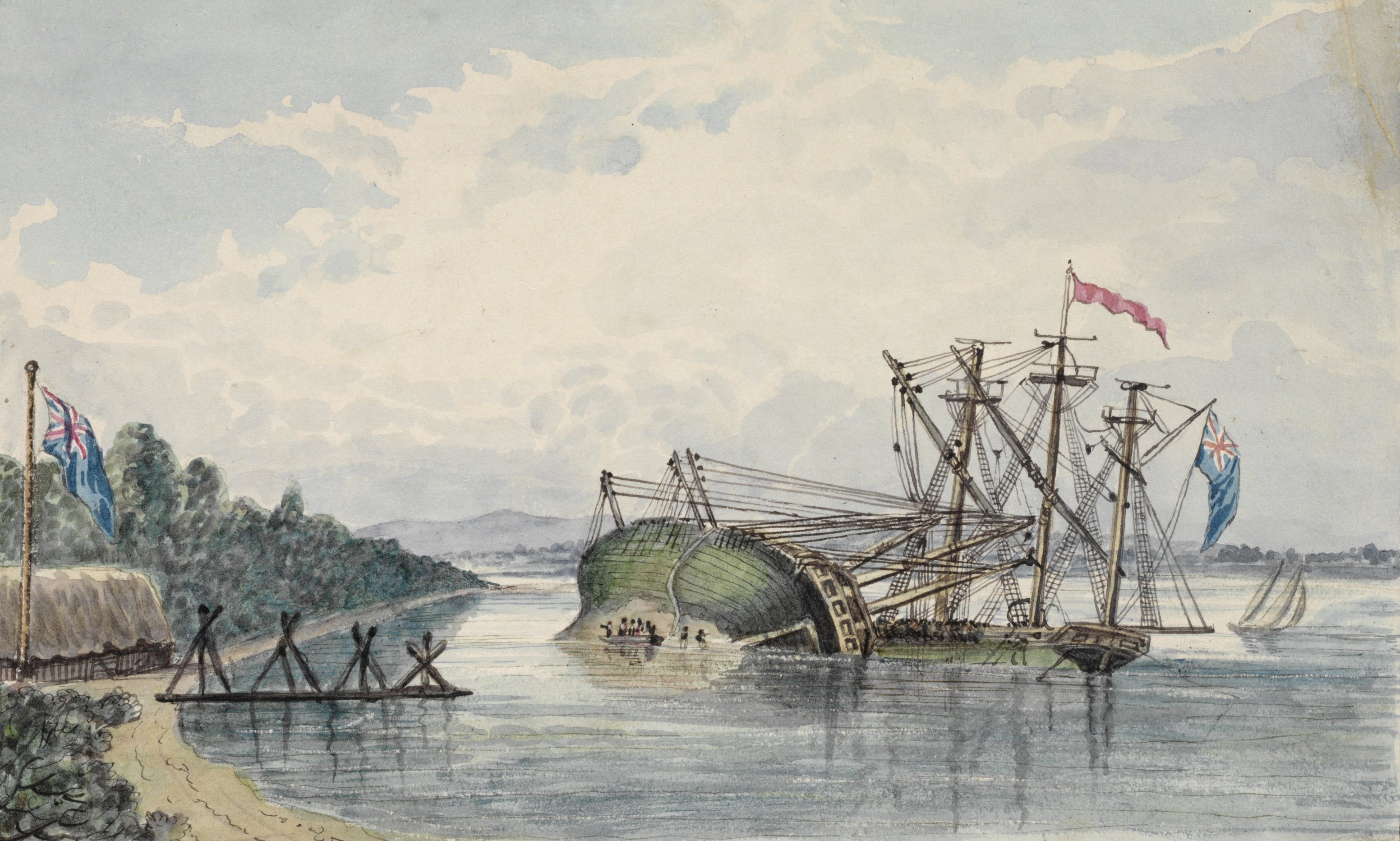
- Success hove down to Cruizer in Careening Bay, Garden Island after running aground at Carnac Island

History

United Kingdom
- Name: HMS Success
- Ordered: 5 June 1819
- Builder: Pembroke Dockyard
- Laid down: July 1823
- Launched: 30 August 1825
- Commissioned: 3 June 1825 at Plymouth
- Reclassified: Receiving ship at Portsmouth 1833
- Fate: Broken up at Portsmouth in June 1849

General characteristics
- Class & type: Atholl-class 28-gun sixth-rate corvette
- Tons burthen: 499 91/94 bm
- Length: 113 ft 8 in (34.6 m) (gundeck); 94 ft 8 3/4 in (28.9 m) (keel)
- Beam: 31 ft 6 in (9.6 m)
- Depth of hold: 8 ft 9 in (2.67 m)
- Sail plan: Full-rigged ship
- Complement: 175
- Armament: Upper deck: 20 × 32-pdr (25cwt) carronades; Quarterdeck: 6 × 18-pdr carronades; Forecastle: 2 × 9-pdr guns

HMS Success was an Atholl-class 28-gun sixth-rate wooden sailing ship notable for exploring Western Australia and the Swan River in 1827 as well as being one of the first ships to arrive at the fledgling Swan River Colony two years later, at which time she ran aground off Carnac Island.

== History ==
Her keel was laid at Pembroke Dock in August 1823 and she was launched on 31 August 1825. She was 114 ft long (35 m) and 32 ft wide (9.8 m), and was a sixth-rate ship with 28 guns, including twenty 32-pounders.

She was sent by the Royal Navy on a mission to New South Wales and Melville Island. She made an expedition to the Swan River in 1827, arriving there in early March. Captain James Stirling was in command. There is a record of the expedition, An account of the expedition of H.M.S. 'Success', Captain James Stirling, RN., from Sydney, to the Swan River, in 1827 by Augustus Gilbert. Another account The visit of Charles Fraser (the colonial botanist of New South Wales) : to the Swan River in 1827, with his opinion on the suitableness of the district for a settlement was published in 1832.

On 3 December 1829 Success ran aground on Shag Rock, Carnac Island. In April Success was taken to Careening Bay on Garden Island for heaving down to HMS Cruizer and repaired.

In February 1833 Success was fitted out as a receiving ship and from 1833 to 1849 was engaged in harbour service in Portsmouth. She was broken up in 1849.

Success Hill, Success Bank, the suburb of Success and a number of other features in Western Australia are named after the ship.
