= Alas Poor Yagan =

Cartoon resulting in a racial discrimination complaint

Alas Poor Yagan, from The West Australian, Saturday 6 September 1997

Alas Poor Yagan is an editorial cartoon created by Dean Alston and published in the Australian newspaper The West Australian on 6 September 1997. The cartoon, consisting of eight panels featuring Noongar activist Ken Colbung and three Indigenous Australian children, sparked controversy due to its content, leading to a racial discrimination complaint lodged with the Human Rights and Equal Opportunity Commission. The commission ruled that while the cartoon made inappropriate references to Noongar beliefs, it did not violate the Racial Discrimination Act 1975. The commission's ruling, which found the cartoon to be an "artistic work" published "reasonably and in good faith", has been the subject of academic debate, with some commentators expressing concern about the broad interpretation of the exemption provided under the Racial Discrimination Act. This decision was upheld upon appeal to the Federal Court of Australia.

The cartoon was published in the wake of the return of the head of Yagan, a Noongar warrior who resisted European settlement of Western Australia, from the United Kingdom. The repatriation process was marked by internal conflicts within the Noongar community, which were publicly aired and even led to litigation in the Supreme Court of Western Australia. The cartoon was seen as critical of these conflicts and was interpreted by some as insulting aspects of Indigenous Australian culture and casting aspersions on the motives and legitimacy of Indigenous Australians with mixed racial heritage.

== Background ==
Alas Poor Yagan was published shortly after the return of Yagan's head from the United Kingdom. Yagan was a Noongar warrior who resisted the European settlement of Western Australia. He was shot dead by a settler in 1833, and his head was removed and sent to the United Kingdom for display in a museum. In 1964, it was buried in an unmarked grave in a local cemetery. The Noongar community began efforts to locate and repatriate the head in 1990. Yagan's head was finally exhumed in September 1997, but organisation of the handover "was accompanied by a degree of sometimes undignified acrimony over who had the appropriate cultural claims, by descent, to bring the remains back". These conflicts within the Noongar community were publicly aired, and at one point even involved litigation in the Supreme Court of Western Australia.

== Publication ==
The West Australian provided coverage of the repatriation of Yagan's head, including the conflict within the Nyungar community. Alas Poor Yagan was published on 6 September 1997. It was critical of the fact that the return of Yagan's head had become a source of conflict between Noongars instead of fostering unity, and it lampooned the conduct of those involved in the conflict. It could also be interpreted as insulting aspects of Indigenous Australian culture, and casting aspersions on the motives and legitimacy of Indigenous Australians with mixed racial heritage.

== Complaint ==
On 24 September 1997, a complaint about the cartoon was lodged with the Race Discrimination Commissioner of the Human Rights and Equal Opportunity Commission. The complaint was made by human rights lawyer Hannah McGlade on behalf of a group of people calling themselves "The Nyungar Circle of Elders", and comprising Albert Corunna, Richard Wilkes, Violet Newman, Mingli Wanjurri, Leisha Eatts, Robert Bropho and Ken Colbung. The complainants alleged that Alston and The West Australian had breached "s18c of the Racial Discrimination Act 1975".

On 4 March 1998, the Race Discrimination Commissioner discontinued her inquiry into the case on the grounds that the cartoon was "an artistic work" that was published "reasonably and in good faith", and was therefore exempt from the s18c conditions under s18d of the Act. The Nyungar Circle of Elders rejected that finding, and asked for the case to be referred to the commission for public inquiry. A public hearing was held on 29 April 1999, and the findings released on 12 April 2001. The Commission found that the cartoon was in breach of s18c of the Act; specifically, it found that the cartoon:

- contained a demeaning portrayal of Yagan;
- reinforced a negative stereotype regarding alcohol and Indigenous Australians;
- contained derogatory references to the Wagyl, a religious figure;
- treated death in a manner offensive to Indigenous Australians;
- provided intimate details of the ancestry of individuals, in some cases "where the intercourse was not a matter of choice for the Aboriginal women concerned";
- implied a diminishing of the race by the resultant racial mix; and
- reinforced a negative stereotype of Indigenous people taking advantage of government grants.

The commission also found, however, that the cartoon was exempt under s18d of the Act, because it was done reasonably and in good faith. The reasoning was based partly on the overall coverage of the issue by The West Australian, which "provided a balance report... and an opinion which... encouraged unity in, and support of, the Aboriginal community". In such a context, the decision by then editor Paul Murray to publish the cartoon was found to be reasonable.

Robert Bropho then sought a judicial review of the commission's finding, but his application was dismissed on 4 December 2002. Bropho then appealed against that decision in the Federal Court of Australia. On 6 February 2004, the Federal Court dismissed the appeal and ordered Bropho to pay all costs.

== Analysis ==
According to McGlade, a number of academic commentators have expressed concern about the ruling, in particular that the protections offered under section 18c were being undermined by a broad interpretation of the s18d exemption. McGlade has argued that "it is extremely difficult to reconcile the serious finding of breach under section 18C with the subsequent finding of reasonableness under section 18D", and that "obviously the adverse findings made of the Commission could have been relied upon to defeat the respondent's claim to have acted reasonably and in good faith. It appears that the complainants were placed under an impossible burden of proving explicit motive and intent.... [P]roper remedies are being denied by the responsible bodies." A similar point is made by Anna Chapman, who argues that "the result of the case was a reification of dominant racial values... in prioritising non-indigenous racial narratives over Indigenous perspectives."
