= Panoramic View of King George's Sound, Part of the Colony of Swan River =

Panoramic view of King Georges Sound, Western Australia

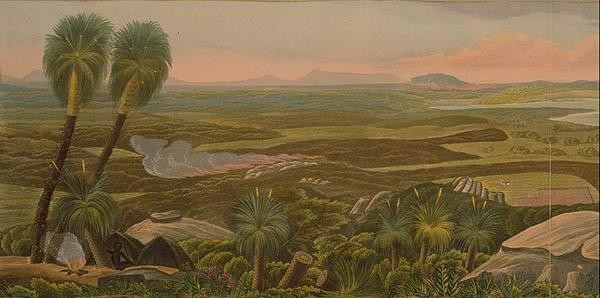
- Portion of the artwork
- Artist: Robert Dale
- Year: 1833
- Medium: 8 distinct panels, hand-coloured and joined
- Subject: View from Mount Clarence summit, including King George Sound
- Dimensions: 19 cm × 274.2 cm (7.5 in × 108.0 in)

Panoramic View of King George's Sound, Part of the Colony of Swan River is a panoramic hand-coloured print published in 1834 by Robert Havell, based on sketches by Robert Dale.

== Background ==
Robert Dale was an ensign in the 63rd Regiment of Foot, which was posted to the Swan River Colony in 1829. He was assigned to the Surveyor-General's department, and thus spent his four years in the colony exploring and surveying. He was the first European to cross the Darling Range, and was thus the European discoverer of the fertile Avon Valley.

The Panoramic View of King George's Sound originated with sketches made by Dale from the summit of Mount Clarence. As an experienced topographic surveyor and cartographer with military training in field sketching, Dale's sketches were a highly accurate and effective representation of the scene.

In 1833, Dale returned to London. Shortly afterwards he completed his sketches, and engaged publisher Robert Havell to have them made into a panorama. A prospectus was advertised, in which the project was dedicated to the Royal Geographical Society. As it was Havell who arranged for the sketches to be etched, printed and hand-coloured, he is sometimes erroneously credited as the author.

== The print ==
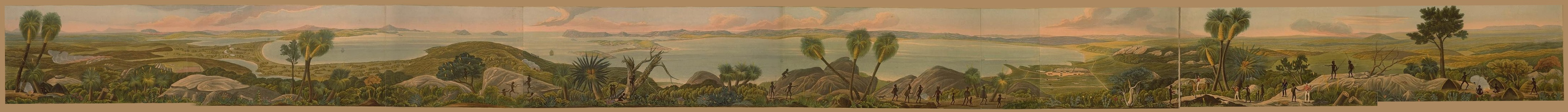
Panoramic view from Mount Clarence summit in Albany, Western Australia, including over King George Sound

The panorama is 19 centimetres (7.5 in) high and 274.2 centimetres (108.0 in) long. It was printed in eight distinct panels, then hand-coloured, and the panels joined. The print presents a view from the summit of Mount Clarence. In the foreground is illustrated the granite outcrops characteristic of the geology of the region, and the distinctive plant genera, including Banksia, Zamia, Xanthorrhoea, Kingia and Nuytsia. The middle ground shows Indigenous Australians engaged in various cultural pursuits including hunting, fishing and possum hunting; also shown is Indigenous Australians in friendly conversation with white soldiers. Beyond this is a neatly laid out town site, being the present-day town of Albany. The background shows the major geographical and physical features, including Oyster Bay, King George Sound, Princess Royal Harbour, the Porongurup Range and the Stirling Range.

George Fletcher Moore saw a print of the panorama in 1835, remarking in his diary:

I have seen Dale's panorama of King George's Sound. It looks well upon paper, and is a very good representation of the Sound and harbour....

Janda Gooding has analysed the subtext of the panorama. She argues that it "present[s] a complex construct of race, place and local politics" and "maps out a series of relationships, including representations of racial superiority that support and enable British military, political, social and economic aims." Of particular importance is the way in which it depicts "two cultures in harmony with each other and their environment"; this would be reassuring to prospective British emigrants to the colony.

== The accompanying pamphlet ==
Dale intended the panorama to be sold in a roll accompanied by an explanatory pamphlet entitled Descriptive account of the panoramic view, &c. of King George's Sound, and the adjacent country. In addition to providing detailed information on the panorama, this pamphlet gave an account of the events leading up to the killing and beheading of the Indigenous warrior Yagan. Dale had brought Yagan's head to London, and had entered into an arrangement with Thomas Pettigrew whereby Pettigrew was given the exclusive right to exhibit the head at his parties. Pettigrew in turn displayed the head in front of a copy of Dale's panorama, and encouraged his guests to buy a panorama as a souvenir of their evening.

Thus, if Dale's panorama is intended to depict racial harmony, its purpose was contradicted by the accompanying pamphlet. It has been suggested that Dale included the information on Yagan in order to support his friend, Lieutenant-Governor Frederick Chidley Irwin, who had returned to London along with Dale in order to justify the killing of Yagan to his superiors.
