= Yagan =

Australian Noongar warrior (c. 1795–1833)

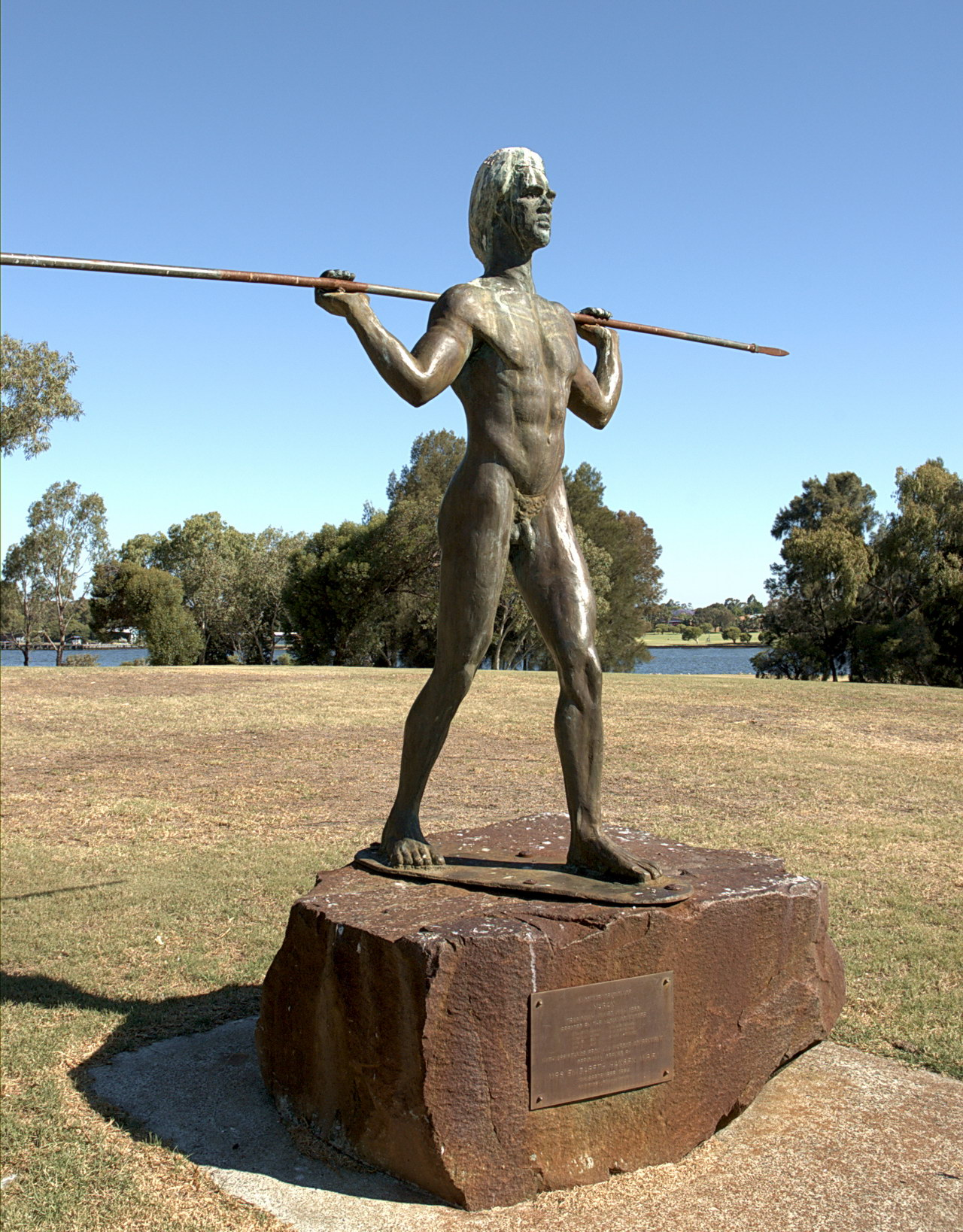
- Statue of Yagan
- Born: c. 1795
- Died: 11 July 1833 (aged c. 38); Violent D battle ground

Yagan (/ˈjeɪɡən/; c. 1795 – 11 July 1833) was an Aboriginal Australian warrior from the Noongar people. Yagan was pursued by the local authorities after he killed Erin Entwhistle, a servant of farmer Archibald Butler. It was an act of retaliation after Thomas Smedley, another of Butler's servants, shot at a group of Noongar people stealing potatoes and fowls, killing one of them. The government offered a bounty for Yagan's capture, dead or alive, and a young settler, William Keats, shot and killed him. Yagan is considered a legendary figure by the Noongar.

After his shooting, settlers cut off Yagan's head to claim the bounty. Later, an official sent it to London, where it was exhibited as an "anthropological curiosity" and eventually given to a museum in Liverpool. It held the head in storage for more than a century before burying it with other remains in an unmarked grave in Liverpool in 1964. Over the years, the Noongar asked for repatriation of the head, both for religious reasons and because of Yagan's traditional stature. The burial site was identified in 1993; officials exhumed the head four years later and repatriated it to Australia. After years of debate within the Noongar community on the appropriate final resting place, Yagan's head was buried in a traditional ceremony in the Swan Valley in July 2010, 177 years after his death.

== Biography ==
=== Early life ===
A member of the Whadjuk Noongar people, Yagan belonged to a tribe of around 60 people whose name, according to Robert Lyon, was Beeliar. Scholars now believe that the Beeliar people may have been a family subgroup (or clan) of a larger tribe whom Daisy Bates called Beelgar. According to Lyon, the Beeliar people occupied the land south of the Swan and Canning rivers, as far south as Mangles Bay. The group had customary land usage rights over a much larger area than this, extending north as far as Galup (formerly called Lake Monger) and northeast to the Helena River. The group also had an unusual degree of freedom to move over their neighbours' land, possibly due to kinship and marriage ties with neighbouring groups.

Yagan is thought to have been born around 1795. His father was Midgegooroo, an elder of the Beeliar people; his mother was one of Midgegooroo's three wives. Yagan was probably a Ballaroke in the Noongar classification.

=== Marriage and family ===
According to the historian Neville Green, Yagan had a wife and two children. A report in the Perth Gazette (now The West Australian) in 1833 gives the names of his children as Naral, age 9, and Willim, age 11, but most other sources state that the warrior was unmarried and childless. When his entry in the Australian Dictionary of Biography was rewritten in 2019, Reece suggested those said to have been his sons may have been his younger brothers. Described as taller than average with an impressive burly physique, Yagan had a distinctive tribal tattoo on his right shoulder, which identified him as "a man of high degree in tribal law". He was generally acknowledged to be the most physically powerful of his tribe, and was said to have been able to spear another stick from a distance of 23 metres (75 ft) or penetrate a tree from a distance of 55 metres (180 ft).

=== Relations with settlers ===
Yagan would have been about 35 years old in 1829 when British settlers landed in the area and established the Swan River Colony. For the first two years of the colony, relations between settlers and Noongar were generally amicable, as there was little competition for resources. The Noongar welcomed the white settlers as Djanga, the returned spirits of their dead. Historical reports noted the two groups shared fish. As time passed, conflicts between the two cultures gradually became more frequent. The settlers thought that the Noongar were nomads who had no claim to the land over which they roamed. Colonists fenced off land for grazing and farming according to their traditional practices of land use.

As the colonists fenced off more land, the Noongar were increasingly denied access to their traditional hunting grounds and sacred sites. In search of food, the Noongar raided the settlers' crops and killed their cattle. They also developed a taste for the settlers' supplies, and began to take flour and other food, which became a serious problem for the colony. In addition, the Noongar practice of firestick farming, or lighting the bush to flush out game threatened the settlers' crops and houses.

In December 1831 Yagan and his father led the first significant Aboriginal resistance to white settlement in Western Australia. Thomas Smedley, a servant of farmer Archibald Butler, apprehended some natives who were raiding a potato patch, and killed one of Yagan's family group. A few days later, Yagan, Midgegooroo and others stormed the farmhouse and, finding the door locked, began to break through the mud-brick walls. Inside were Butler's servant Erin Entwhistle and his two sons Enion and Ralph. After hiding his sons under the bed, Entwhistle opened the door to parley and was killed by Yagan and Midgegooroo. Noongar tribal law required that murders be avenged by the killing of a member of the murderer's tribal group, not necessarily the murderer. The Noongar considered servants and employees to be part of the settlers' groups. Historians believe the Noongar attack on Entwhistle was retribution under their tribal law. Not understanding tribal law (and unlikely to agree with its concepts if they had), the white settlers took the killing to be an unprovoked murder and dispatched a force to arrest Yagan's group, without success.

In June 1832 Yagan led a party of Noongar in attacking two labourers sowing a field of wheat alongside the Canning River near Kelmscott. One of the men, John Thomas, escaped, but the other, William Gaze, was wounded and later died as a result. The settlement declared Yagan an outlaw and offered a reward of £20, equivalent to roughly A$2,640 in 2022, for his capture. He avoided capture until early October 1832. A group of fishermen enticed Yagan and two companions into their boat, then pushed off into deep water. The fishermen took the three Noongar men to the Perth guardhouse, from which they were transferred to the Round House at Fremantle. Yagan was sentenced to death, but he was saved by the intercession of settler Robert Lyon. Arguing that Yagan was defending his land against invasion, Lyon said Yagan should not be considered a criminal but a prisoner of war and suggested he should be treated as such. At the recommendation of John Septimus Roe, the Surveyor-General of Western Australia, Yagan and his men were exiled on Carnac Island under the supervision of Lyon and two soldiers.

Lyon thought he could teach Yagan British ways and convert him to Christianity. He hoped to gain his cooperation and use his tribal stature to persuade the Noongar to accept colonial authority. Lyon spent many hours with Yagan learning his language and customs. After a month, Yagan and his companions escaped by stealing an unattended dinghy and rowing to Woodman Point on the mainland. The Government did not pursue them; apparently its officials considered they had been sufficiently punished.

In January 1833 two Noongar, Gyallipert and Manyat, visited Perth from King George Sound, where relations between settlers and natives were amicable. Two settlers, Richard Dale and George Smythe, arranged for the men to meet a party of local Noongar to encourage friendly relations in the Swan River Colony. On 26 January Yagan led a group of ten formally armed Noongars in greeting the two men near Galup (formerly called Lake Monger). The men exchanged weapons and held a corroboree, though the groups did not appear to share a language. Yagan and Gyallipert competed at spear throwing. As an example of his prowess, Yagan struck a walking stick from a distance of 25 metres (82 ft).

Gyallipert and Manyat remained in Perth for some time. On 3 March, Yagan obtained permission to hold another corroboree, this time in the post office garden in Perth. The Perth and King George Sound men met at dusk, chalked their bodies, and performed a number of dances including a kangaroo hunt dance. The Perth Gazette wrote that Yagan "was master of ceremonies and acquitted himself with infinite grace and dignity".

During February and March, Yagan was involved in a series of minor conflicts with settlers. In February William Watson complained that Yagan had pushed open his door, demanded a gun, and taken handkerchiefs. Watson had to give him and his companions flour and bread. The following month, Yagan was among a group who received biscuits from a military contingent under Lieutenant Norcott; when Norcott tried to restrict his supply, Yagan threatened him with his spear. Later that month, Yagan was with a group of Noongar who entered Watson's house while he was away. The group left after Watson's wife called on neighbours for help. The next day Captain Ellis lectured the Noongar about their behaviour. The frequent incidents prompted The Perth Gazette to remark on "the reckless daring of this desperado who sets his life at a pin's fee ... For the most trivial offence ... he would take the life of any man who provoked him. He is at the head and front of any mischief."

=== Wanted dead or alive ===
On the night of 29 April, a party of Noongar broke into a Fremantle store to steal flour and they were shot at by the caretaker Peter Chidlow. Domjum, a brother of Yagan, was badly injured and died in jail a few days later. The rest of the party moved from Fremantle to Preston Point, where Yagan reportedly vowed vengeance for the death. Between 50 and 60 Noongar gathered at Bull Creek, where they met a party of settlers who were loading carts with provisions. Later that day, the group ambushed the lead cart, killing two settlers, Tom and John Velvick. Tribal law required only a single death for vengeance. Some historians have speculated that the Velvicks were targeted because they had previously been convicted for assaulting Aboriginal people and coloured seamen. Alexandra Hasluck has also argued that stealing provisions was an important motive in the attack, but this has been refuted elsewhere.

For the killing of the Velvicks, the Lieutenant-Governor Frederick Irwin declared Yagan, Midgegooroo and Munday to be outlaws, offering rewards of £20 each for the capture of Midgegooroo and Munday, and a reward of £30 for Yagan's capture, dead or alive. Munday successfully appealed against his proscription. Midgegooroo, Yagan and their group immediately moved from their territory north towards the Helena Valley. On 17 May, Midgegooroo was captured on the Helena River, and executed by firing squad on 22 May. There was no trial, even in the sense of an informal hearing. Midgegooroo was clearly not allowed the opportunity to give evidence or defend himself and indeed it is probable that he did not understand what was being alleged.

Yagan remained at large for over two months. Late in May, George Fletcher Moore reported seeing Yagan on his property and talking with him in pidgin English. Moore wrote in the Perth Gazette:

Yagan stepped forward and leaning with his left hand on my shoulder while he gesticulated with the right, delivered a sort of recitation, looking earnestly in my face. I regret I could not understand it, I thought from the tone and manner that the purport was this:

You came to our country – you have driven us from our haunts, and disturbed us in our occupations. As we walk in our own country we are fired upon by the white men; why should the white men treat us so?

Since Moore had little knowledge of Yagan's native language, the historian Hasluck suggests that this account is probably more indicative of "a feeling of conscience on the part of the white men" than an accurate rendering of Yagan's state of mind.

Yagan asked Moore whether Midgegooroo was dead or alive. Moore gave no reply, but a servant answered that Midgegooroo was a prisoner on Carnac Island. Yagan warned, "White man shoot Midgegooroo, Yagan kill three." Moore reported the encounter but made no attempt to restrain Yagan. He later wrote, "The truth is, every one wishes him taken, but no one likes to be the captor ... there is something in his daring which one is forced to admire."

=== Death ===
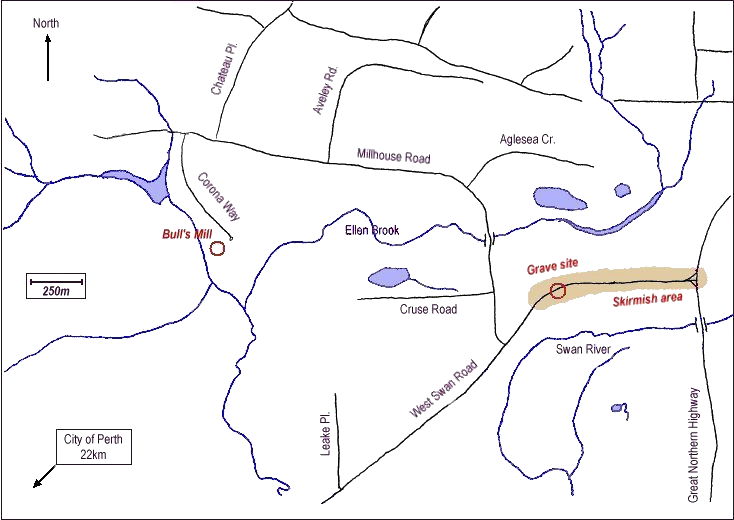
Skirmish area showing gravesite and Henry Bull's mill

On 11 July 1833, two teenage brothers named William and James Keates were herding cattle along the Swan River north of Guildford when a group of Noongar approached while en route to collect flour rations from Henry Bull's house. The Keates brothers suggested Yagan remain with them to avoid arrest. While he was staying with them during the morning, the brothers decided to kill the warrior and claim the reward. When the natives were ready to depart, the Keateses took their last opportunity. William Keates shot Yagan, and James shot Heegan, another native, in the act of throwing his spear. The brothers ran away, but other Noongar overtook William and speared him to death. James escaped by swimming the river. Shortly afterward he returned with a party of armed settlers from Bull's estate.

When the party of settlers arrived, they found Yagan dead and Heegan dying. Heegan "was groaning and his brains were partly out when the party came, and whether humanity or brutality, a man put a gun to his head and blew it to pieces." The settlers cut Yagan's head from his body, and skinned his back to obtain his tribal markings as a trophy. They buried the bodies a short distance away.

James Keates claimed the reward, but his conduct was widely criticised. The Perth Gazette referred to Yagan's killing as "a wild and treacherous act ... it is revolting to hear this lauded as a meritorious deed." However, Daisy Bates posits that "he was killed in self-defence by the young lad." Keates left the colony the following month, possibly from fear of being murdered in tribal retaliation.

== Yagan's head ==
=== Exhibition and burial ===
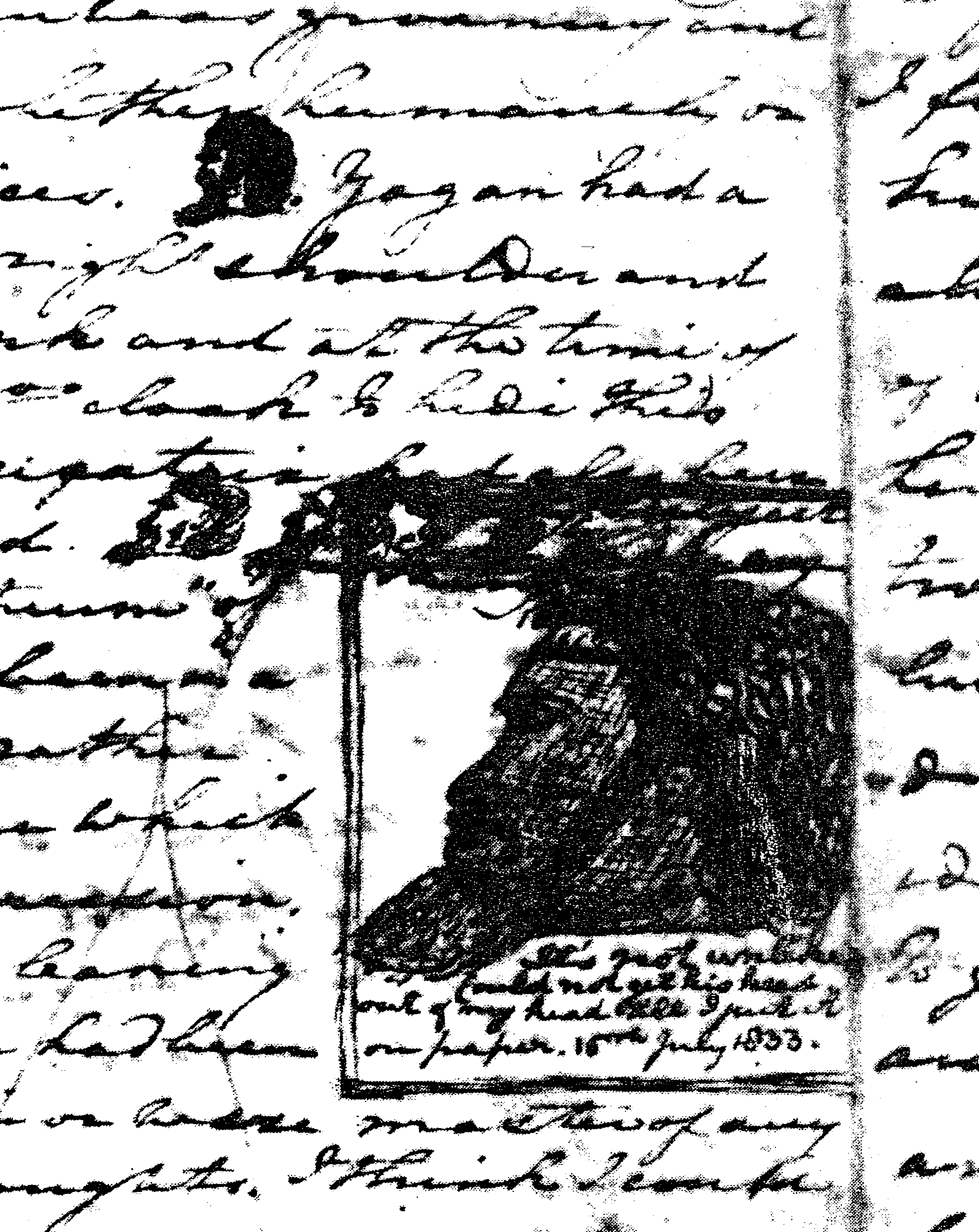
A portion of George Fletcher Moore's handwritten diary, showing sketches of Yagan's head

Yagan's head was initially taken to Henry Bull's house. Moore saw it there and sketched the head a number of times in his unpublished, handwritten diary, commenting that "possibly it may yet figure in some museum at home." The head was preserved by smoking.

In September 1833, Governor Irwin sailed for London, partly to give his own account of the events leading up to the killing. This was an unusual measure, especially given his regiment was about to leave for a tour of duty in India. The Colonial Office indicated satisfaction with Irwin's administration of the colony.

Travelling with Irwin was Ensign Robert Dale, who had somehow acquired Yagan's head. According to the historian Paul Turnbull, Dale appears to have persuaded Irwin to let him have the head as an "anthropological curiosity". After arriving in London, Dale tried to sell the head to scientists, approaching a number of anatomists and phrenologists. His price of £20 failed to find a buyer, so he made an agreement with Thomas Pettigrew for the exclusive use of the head for 18 months. Pettigrew, a surgeon and antiquarian, was well known in the London social scene for holding private parties at which he unrolled and autopsied ancient Egyptian mummies. He displayed the head on a table in front of a panoramic view of King George Sound reproduced from Dale's sketches. For effect, the head was adorned with a fresh corded headband and feathers of the red-tailed black cockatoo.

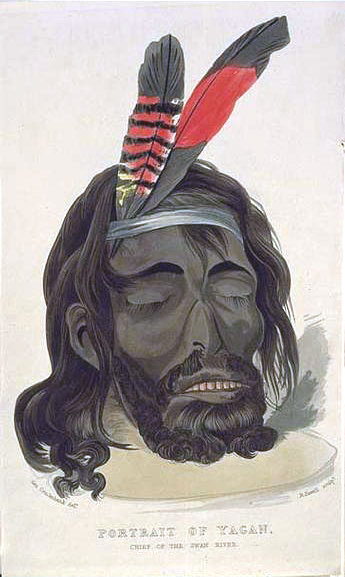
Portrait of Yagan by George Cruikshank. This portrait was painted from observations of Yagan's severed head, which had shrunk substantially during preservation by smoking. George Fletcher Moore said it bore little resemblance to the living Yagan, whose face was "plump, with a burly-headed look about it".

Pettigrew had the head examined by a phrenologist. Examination was considered difficult because of the large fracture across the back of the head caused by the gunshot. His conclusions were consistent with contemporary European opinion of Indigenous Australians. Dale published these in a pamphlet entitled Descriptive Account of the Panoramic View &c. of King George's Sound and the Adjacent Country, which Pettigrew encouraged his guests to buy as a souvenir of their evening. The frontispiece of the pamphlet was a hand-coloured aquatint print of Yagan's head by the artist George Cruikshank.

Early in October 1835, Yagan's head and the panoramic view were returned to Dale, then living in Liverpool. On 12 October he presented them to the Liverpool Royal Institution, where the head may have been displayed in a case along with some other preserved heads and wax models illustrating cranial anatomy. In 1894 the Institution's collections were dispersed, and Yagan's head was lent to the Liverpool Museum; it is thought not to have been put on display there. By the 1960s Yagan's head was badly deteriorated. In April 1964 the museum decided to dispose of it. It arranged burial of the head on 10 April 1964, together with a Peruvian mummy and a Māori head. They were buried in Everton Cemetery's General Section 16, grave number 296. In later years a number of burials were made around the grave. For example, in 1968 a local hospital buried directly over the box, 20 stillborn babies and two infants who died soon after birth.

=== Lobbying for repatriation ===
For many years beginning in the early 1980s, a number of Noongar groups sought the return of Yagan's head to Australia.

It is Aboriginal belief that because Yagan's skeletal remains are incomplete, his spirit is earthbound. The uniting of his head and torso will immediately set his spirit free to continue its eternal journey.

At the time, there was no historical trail for the head after Pettigrew passed it on. Tribal elders entrusted the Aboriginal leader Ken Colbung with the search. In the early 1990s, Colbung enlisted the aid of University of London archaeologist Peter Ucko. One of Ucko's researchers, Cressida Fforde, conducted a literature search for information on the head. Fforde successfully traced the head in December 1993. The following April, Colbung applied to exhume the remains under Section 25 of the Burial Act 1857. Home Office regulations required next of kin consent before disturbing the remains of the 22 infants. Colbung's solicitors requested waiver of this condition on grounds that the exhumation would be of great personal significance to Yagan's living relatives, and great national importance to Australia.

Meanwhile, divisions in the Noongar community in Perth began to develop. Some elders questioned Colbung's role and one Noongar registered a complaint with the Liverpool City Council over his involvement. Media reports indicated acrimonious debate within the Noongar community about who had the best cultural qualifications to take possession of the head. The academic Hannah McGlade claims that these divisions were largely manufactured by the media, particularly The West Australian, which "aimed to and successfully represented the Nyungar community in terms of disharmony and dissent". She alleges that one West reporter contacted Noongar who were known to be in disagreement, and quoted one to the other, so as to elicit provocative responses. The disputes were "trumpeted" by The West, allowing it to "preach" against the infighting.

On 25 July a public meeting was held in Perth. All parties agreed to put aside their differences and co-operate to ensure that the repatriation was a "national success". A Yagan Steering Committee was established to co-ordinate the repatriation, and Colbung's application was allowed to proceed. In January 1995 the Home Office advised Colbung that it was unable to waive the requirement to obtain next of kin consent for the exhumation. It contacted the five relatives whose addresses were known, and received unconditional consent from only one. Accordingly, on 30 June 1995, Colbung and the other interested parties were advised that the application for exhumation had been rejected.

Meeting on 21 September, the Yagan Steering Committee decided to lobby Australian and British politicians for support. In 1997 Colbung was invited to visit the United Kingdom at the British government's expense and he arrived on 20 May. His visit attracted substantial media coverage, and increased the political pressure on the British Government. He secured the support of the Prime Minister of Australia, John Howard, after gate crashing the Prime Minister's June visit to the United Kingdom.

=== Exhumation ===
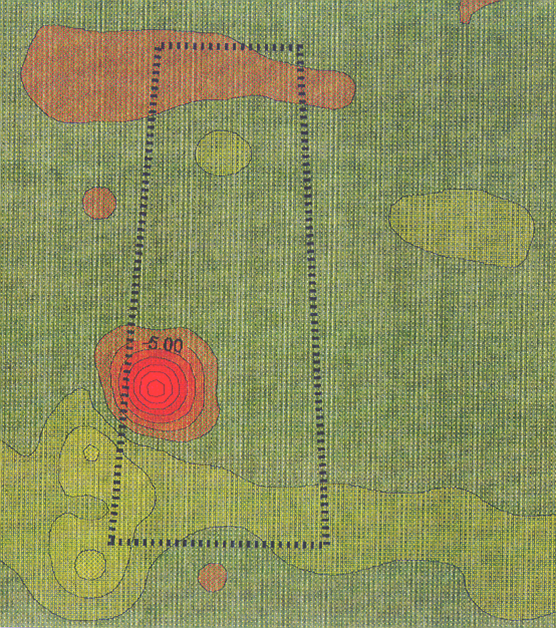
A horizontal colour contour map of ground conductivity of Yagan's grave site, showing an anomaly in the electromagnetic signature caused by metal artefacts buried with Yagan's head

While Colbung was in the United Kingdom, Martin and Richard Bates were engaged to undertake a geophysical survey of the grave site. Using electromagnetic and ground penetrating radar techniques, they identified an approximate position of the box that suggested it could be accessed from the side via the adjacent plot. A report of the survey was passed to the Home Office, prompting further discussions between the British and Australian Governments.

Of concern to the Home Office were an undisclosed number of letters that it had received objecting to Colbung's involvement in the repatriation process; it therefore sought assurances from the Australian Government that Colbung was a correct applicant. In response Colbung asked his elders to ask the Aboriginal and Torres Strait Islander Commission (ATSIC) to tell the British Home Office that he was the correct applicant. ATSIC then convened a meeting in Perth at which it was again resolved that Colbung's application could proceed.

Colbung continued to press for the exhumation, asking that it be performed before the 164th anniversary of Yagan's death on 11 July, so that the anniversary could be the occasion of a celebration. His request was not met, and on the anniversary of Yagan's death, Colbung conducted a short memorial service at the burial plot in Everton. He returned to Australia empty-handed on 15 July.

The exhumation of Yagan's head eventually proceeded, without Colbung's knowledge, by excavating 1.8 metres (6 ft) down the side of the grave, then tunnelling horizontally to the location of the box. Thus the exhumation was performed without disturbing any other remains. The following day, a forensic palaeontologist from the University of Bradford positively identified the skull as Yagan's by correlating the fractures with those described in Pettigrew's report. The skull was then kept at the museum until 29 August, when it was handed over to the Liverpool City Council.

=== Repatriation ===
On 27 August 1997, a delegation of Noongars consisting of Ken Colbung, Robert Bropho, Richard Wilkes and Mingli Wanjurri-Nungala arrived in the UK to collect Yagan's head. The delegation was to have been larger, but Commonwealth funding was withdrawn at the last minute. The handover of Yagan's skull was further delayed when a Noongar named Corrie Bodney applied to the Supreme Court of Western Australia for an injunction against the handover. Claiming that his family group has sole responsibility for Yagan's remains, Bodney declared the exhumation illegal and denied the existence of any tradition or belief necessitating the head's exhumation and removal to Australia. On 29 August, Justice Henry Wallwork rejected the injunction application, on the grounds that Bodney had previously agreed to the current arrangements, and on the evidence of another Noongar elder (Albert Corunna, who claimed to be a closer relation of Yagan) and anthropologist Pat Baines, both of whom refuted Bodney's claim to sole responsibility.

Yagan's skull was handed over to the Noongar delegation at a ceremony at Liverpool Town Hall on 31 August 1997. In accepting the skull, Colbung made comments that were interpreted as linking Yagan's death with the death of Diana, Princess of Wales, earlier that day:

That is how nature goes ... Nature is a carrier of all good things and all bad things. And because the Poms did the wrong thing, they now have to suffer.

Colbung's comments prompted a media furore throughout Australia, with newspapers receiving many letters from the public expressing shock and anger at the comments. Colbung later claimed that his comments had been misinterpreted.

Throughout the repatriation process, many sections of the international media treated the story as a joke. For example, U.S. News & World Report ran a story under the headline Raiders of the Lost Conk, in which Yagan's head was referred to as a "pickled curio", and Colbung's actions were treated as a publicity stunt.

=== Preparations for reburial ===
On its return to Perth, Yagan's head continued to be a source of controversy and conflict. Responsibility for reburial of the head was given to a "Committee for the Reburial of Yagan's Kaat", headed by Richard Wilkes. The reburial was delayed by disputes between elders over the burial location, mainly due to uncertainty of the whereabouts of the rest of his body, and disagreement about the importance of burying the head with the body.

A number of attempts were made to locate the remains of Yagan's body, which were believed to be on Lot 39 West Swan Road in the outer Perth suburb of Belhus. A remote sensing survey of the site was carried out in 1998, but no remains were found. An archaeological survey of the area was undertaken two years later, but this also was unsuccessful. Disputes then arose over whether the head could be buried separately from the body. Wilkes has claimed that it can, so long as it is placed where Yagan was killed, so that Dreamtime spirits can reunite the remains.

In 1998 the Western Australian Planning Commission and the Department of Aboriginal Affairs jointly published a document entitled Yagan's Gravesite Master Plan, which discussed "matters of ownership, management, development and future use" of the property on which Yagan's remains are believed to be buried. Under consideration was the possibility of turning the site into an Indigenous burial site, to be managed by the Metropolitan Cemeteries Board.

Yagan's head spent some time in storage in a bank vault before being handed over to forensics experts who reconstructed a model from it. After that it was held in storage at Western Australia's state mortuary. Plans to re-bury the head were repeatedly deferred, causing ongoing conflict between Noongar groups. In September 2008 it was reported that Yagan's head would be reburied in November, and a Yagan Memorial Park created as a projected cost of A$996,000; equivalent to A$1.38 million in 2022, but in November it was announced that the reburial had been rescheduled for July 2009 because of logistical problems. In March 2009, it was announced that the Department of Indigenous Affairs had given the City of Swan more than A$500,000, equivalent to A$681,700 in 2022, to develop the park.

=== Reburial ===
The head was finally buried in a private ceremony attended only by invited Noongar elders, on 10 July 2010, the anniversary of the last full day he lived and one day before the end of NAIDOC Week 2010. The site in Belhus was chosen as it is believed to be near to where the rest of Yagan's body was buried. The burial coincided with a ceremony to mark the opening of the Yagan Memorial Park, which was attended by around 300 people, including Noongar elders and state government representatives. Premier Colin Barnett described the occasion as "a wonderful day for all West Australians".

The art works for the Yagan Memorial Park were designed by Peter Farmer, Sandra Hill, Jenny Dawson and Kylie Ricks. Dawson and Hill created an entry wall of Yagan's story; Farmer designed the park entry statements and Ricks the female coolamon.

== Legacy ==
In the Australian Dictionary of Biography, Reece wrote that Yagan "was not the brutal, indiscriminate killer most settlers thought him to be", but sought to enforce the Noongar system of retributive justice "as the only basis for a resolution of conflict between Noongars and colonists". Yagan was a lone actor in this regard:

Yagan cannot properly be described as a "resistance leader" when the Noongars offered no organised and sustained opposition to the settlers. He was more of a maverick, a bold and courageous warrior whose actions on behalf of his people and their rights made him notorious.

The repatriation of Yagan's head increased the Aboriginal leader's notability. He is considered a famous historical figure throughout Australia, with material about him appearing in such publications as the Australian Dictionary of Biography, and Western Australia's school curriculum. He is of greatest significance to the Noongar people, for whom he is "a revered, cherished and heroic individual ... patriot and visionary hero of WA's South-West". The return of his head was likened by some Indigenous Australians to the November 1993 ceremonial repatriation from Gallipoli of Australia's unknown soldier.

The former Upper Swan Bridge, which carries the Great Northern Highway over the Swan River at Belhus, was renamed the Yagan Bridge in 2010.

An open plaza in the Perth central business district, constructed as part of the Perth City Link urban renewal project, was named Yagan Square. Featuring the 9-metre-tall (30 ft) statue Wirin, the plaza, located adjacent to the Horseshoe Bridge, was opened on 3 March 2018.

== Cultural references ==
=== Alas Poor Yagan ===
The final two frames of Dean Alston's 1997 cartoon Alas Poor Yagan

On 6 September 1997 The West Australian published a Dean Alston cartoon entitled Alas Poor Yagan, which was critical of the fact that the return of Yagan's head had become a source of conflict between Noongars instead of fostering unity. The cartoon was interpreted by some as insulting aspects of Noongar culture, and casting aspersions on the motives and legitimacy of Indigenous Australians with mixed racial heritage. The content of the cartoon offended many Indigenous Australians, and a group of Noongar elders complained about the cartoon to the Human Rights and Equal Opportunity Commission. The commission ruled that the cartoon made inappropriate references to Noongar beliefs but was not in breach of the Racial Discrimination Act 1975 because it was "an artistic work" that was published "reasonably and in good faith", and was therefore exempt. This ruling was upheld on appeal by the Federal Court of Australia. Some academic commentators have since expressed concern that the protections offered under the act have been undermined by the ruling's broad interpretation of the exemptions.

=== Statue ===
From the mid-1970s, members of the Noongar community lobbied for the erection of a statue of Yagan as part of the WAY 1979 sesquicentennial celebrations. Their requests were refused, however, after the Premier, Charles Court, was advised by one prominent historian that Yagan was not important enough to warrant a statue. Colbung claims "Court was more interested in spending tax payers' money on refurbishing the badly neglected burial place of Captain James Stirling, WA's first governor." Despite this setback, the Noongar community persisted, establishing a Yagan Committee and running a number of fund-raising drives. Eventually, sufficient funds were collected to allow the commissioning of Australian sculptor Robert Hitchcock to create a statue. The result was a life-size statue in bronze, depicting Yagan standing naked with a spear held across his shoulders. Hitchcock's statue of Yagan was officially opened by Yagan Committee chairperson Elizabeth Hanson on 11 September 1984. It stands on Heirisson Island in the Swan River near Perth.

In 1997, within a week of the return of Yagan's head to Perth, vandals beheaded the statue using an angle grinder. Soon after a replacement head was installed and it too was detached and stolen. Credit for the act was anonymously claimed by a "British loyalist" as an act of retaliation for Colbung's comments about Diana, Princess of Wales. The Western Australia Police did not succeed in identifying the vandals, nor in recovering the heads, and deemed it infeasible to have the statue fenced off or placed under guard.

Commentary on the beheadings varied widely. One column in The West Australian found humour in them, referring to the head as a "bonce" and a "noggin", and finished with a pun on "skullduggery". Stephen Muecke calls this the "satirical trivialising of Aboriginal concerns", and Adam Shoemaker writes "This is the stuff of light humour and comic relief. There is no sense of the decapitation as being an act of vandalism, even less that it could have been motivated by malevolence ... [T]he piece has a definite authorising function." On the other hand, academic analysis has treated the act with much more gravity. In 2007, for example, David Martin described the decapitation as "an act which speaks not only to the continuance of white settler racism, but also to the power of mimesis to invigorate our modern memorials and monuments with a life of their own".

In 2002, Janet Woollard, the member for Alfred Cove, called for the statue's genitalia to be covered up. In November 2005, Richard Wilkes also called for the statue's groin to be covered on the grounds that such a depiction would be more historically accurate, as Yagan would have worn a covering for most of the year. Also under consideration is the creation of a new statue with a head shape that accords better with the forensic reconstruction of Yagan's head.

=== Literature and film ===
Mary Durack published a fictionalised account of Yagan's life in her 1964 children's novel The Courteous Savage: Yagan of the Swan River, which was renamed Yagan of the Bibbulmun on reissue in 1976.

The repeated beheading of Yagan's statue in 1997 prompted Aboriginal writer Archie Weller to write a short story entitled Confessions of a Headhunter. Weller later worked with film director Sally Riley to adapt the story into a script, and in 2000 a 35-minute movie, also named Confessions of a Headhunter, was released. Directed by Sally Riley, the movie won Best Short Fiction Film at the 2000 AFI Awards. The following year the script won the Script Award in the 2001 Western Australian Premier's Book Awards.

In 2002, the South African-born Australian poet John Mateer published his fourth collection of poems, entitled Loanwords. The collection is divided into four sections, of which the third, In the Presence of a Severed Head, has Yagan as its subject.

A two-part miniseries called Yagan, was commissioned by ABC International. Supported by Screen Australia, the documentary was written and directed by Kelrick Martin and produced by Derek Jowsey of Spear Point Productions, and released in 2012. It continues to be available on SBS On Demand.

=== Other cultural references ===
A section of Kullark, a play by Jack Davis, explores the deteriorating relationship between Yagan and a settler couple.

In September 1989 an early maturing cultivar of barley, bred by the Western Australian Department of Agriculture for performance on sandy soils, was released under the name "Hordeum vulgare (Barley) c.v. Yagan". Commonly referred to simply as "Yagan", the cultivar is named for Yagan, continuing a tradition of labelling Western Australian grain cultivars after historic people of Western Australia.

== See also ==
- Jandamarra, and the Bunuba War.
- Musquito a warrior of the Gai-Mariagal clan
- Pemulwuy a warrior and resistance leader of the Bidjigal clan of the Eora people, in the area around Sydney
- Tunnerminnerwait, an Australian Aboriginal resistance fighter and Parperloihener clansman from Tasmania
- Windradyne, a warrior and resistance leader of the Wiradjuri nation, in what is now central-western New South Wales
- Australian frontier wars
- List of Indigenous Australian historical figures

== Sources ==
- AAP (11 July 2010). "Warrior Yagan laid to rest". The Age. Perth.
- AAP; Australian Geographic (12 July 2010). "Warrior reburied 170 years after death". Australian Geographic. Archived from the original on 23 June 2013.
- "Memorial park for Noongar warrior". Australia: ABC News. 6 March 2009. Archived from the original on 8 November 2012.
- "Aboriginal warrior's final resting place". Australia: ABC News. 3 June 2010. Archived from the original on 28 February 2022.
- Alston, Dean (6 September 1997). "Alas Poor Yagan". The West Australian.
- Artsource (n.d.). "Yagan Memorial Park". Artsource.
- Australian Film Institute (2025). "AACTA Awards → Winners & Nominees → 2000–2010 → 2000 → Non-Feature Film". Australian Film Institute.
- Australian Film Commission (2007). "Confessions of a Headhunter". Australian Film Commission. Archived from the original on 26 September 2007.
- Bates, Daisy M. (4 July 1929). "Aboriginal Perth". Western Mail. Vol. 44, no. 2264. Western Australia. p. 70 – via National Library of Australia.
- Bourke, Michael (1987). "Chapter 3: Yagan 'The Patriot' and 'Governor' Weeip". On the Swan. Nedlands: University of Western Australia Press. ISBN 0-85564-258-0.
- Bropho v Human Rights & Equal Opportunity Commission, 2004 FCAFC 16 (Federal Court of Australia 6 February 2004).
- Burrell, Ian (31 May 1997). "Hi-tech FBI Tools to retrieve Aboriginal chief's head". The Independent.
- Chapman, Anna (2004). "Australian Racial Hatred Law: Some Comments on Reasonableness and Adjudicative Method in Complaints Brought by Indigenous People" (PDF). Monash University Law Review. 30 (1, 2004): 27–48.
- City of Swan (11 June 2013). "In My Area → Upper Swan → My Suburb". City of Swan. Archived from the original on 3 July 2014. "In tribute to the famous Aboriginal warrior, Yagan, the Upper Swan Bridge was renamed the Yagan Bridge in 2010."
- Colbung, Ken (1996). Yagan: The Swan River 'Settlement'. Redfern: Australia Council for the Arts. OCLC 222096051.
- Cook, Karen Severud (2003). "The Secret Agenda of Western Australian Explorer, Robert Dale (1809–1853)". The Globe (54): 23–34. ISSN 0311-3930. S2CID 163215217.
- Cookson, Jasmine (3 March 2018). "Perth's Yagan Square finally opens to the public". Australia: ABC News.
- Corunna v West Australian Newspapers, EOC 93–146 (Human Rights and Equal Opportunity Commission 12 April 2001).
- Curriculum Council (2007). Aboriginal and Intercultural Studies (PDF). Curriculum Council of Western Australia. Archived from the original (PDF) on 11 April 2008.
- Dale, Robert (1834). Descriptive Account of the Panoramic View, and of King George's Sound, and the Adjacent Country . London: J. Cross and R. Havell. OCLC 84754034. Wikidata Q19080653 – via Wikisource.
- Danta, Chris (May 2003). "J. Mateer, Loanwords". Colloquy (7). Monash University. Archived from the original on 30 September 2009.
- Department of Indigenous Affairs (November 2009). "Yagan Memorial Park" (PDF). DIA Newsletter (1). Perth: Department of Indigenous Affairs, Government of Western Australia: 4.
- DevelopmentWA (2 March 2018). "Market Hall and Horseshoe Lane construction". DevelopmentWA. Government of Western Australia. Archived from the original on 25 July 2020.
- Durack, Mary (1964). The Courteous Savage: Yagan of Swan River. West Melbourne: Thomas Nelson. OL 19592011M.
- Durack, Mary (1976). Yagan of the Bibbulmun. West Melbourne: Thomas Nelson. ISBN 0-17-001996-9.
- Egan, Colleen (31 May 2014). "City square to be named after Yagan". The West Australian. Archived from the original on 19 February 2025.
- Emerson, Daniel (3 June 2010). "Burial for Yagan's head". The West Australian. Archived from the original on 16 September 2012.
- Fforde, Cressida (2002). "Chapter 18: Yagan". In Fforde, Cressida; Hubert, Jane; Turnbull, Paul (eds.). The Dead and Their Possessions: Repatriation in Principle, Policy, and Practice. London: Routledge. pp. 229–241. ISBN 0-415-23385-2.
- Fforde, Cressida (2013). "Repatriation". National Museum of Australia. Archived from the original on 31 October 2013.
- Green, Neville (1979). "Yagan, the Patriot". In Hunt, Lyall (ed.). Westralian Portraits. Nedlands, Western Australia: University of Western Australia Press. ISBN 0-85564-157-6.
- Green, Neville (1981). "Aborigines and White Settlers in the Nineteenth Century". In Stannage, Charles Thomas (ed.). A New History of Western Australia. Nedlands: UWA Publishing. pp. 72–123. ISBN 0-85564-181-9. LCCN 82101009. OCLC 963830667. OL 3517729M. Wikidata Q125995168.
- Green, Neville (1984). Broken Spears: Aboriginals and Europeans in the southwest of Australia. Cottesloe: Focus Education Services. ISBN 0-9591828-1-0. LCCN 85194823. OCLC 1285471045. OL 2625980M. Wikidata Q136385324.
- Hallam, Sylvia J.; Tilbrook, Lois (1990). Aboriginals of the Southwest Region, 1829–1840. The Bicentennial Dictionary of Western Australians. Vol. 8. Nedlands: University of Western Australia Press. ISBN 0-85564-296-3.
- Hasluck, Alexandra (1961). Wright, Ronald P. (ed.). "Yagan the Patriot" (PDF). Early Days: Journal and Proceedings of the Western Australian Historical Society. 5 (7). Perth: Western Australian Historical Society: 33–48.
- Moore, George Fletcher (1 June 1833). "From a Correspondent". The Perth Gazette and Western Australian Journal. Vol. 1, no. 22. Western Australia. p. 87 – via National Library of Australia.
- Moore, George Fletcher (1884). Diary of Ten Years Eventful Life of an Early Settler in Western Australia. London: M. Walbrook. LCCN 43042806. OCLC 5343980. OL 7030461M. Wikidata Q19081637.
- Hasluck, Alexandra (1967). "Yagan (1795–1833)". Australian Dictionary of Biography. Vol. 2. National Centre of Biography, Australian National University. ISBN 978-0-522-84459-7. ISSN 1833-7538. OCLC 70677943.
- Inglis, Kenneth Stanley (1998). Sacred Places. War Memorials in the Australian Landscape. Carlton: Melbourne University Press. ISBN 0-522-84976-8. OCLC 49298019. "[Hasluck] advised the states anti-Labor government not to agree. University historians pleaded Yagan's cause in vain."
- "Yagan". Kaartdijin Noongar. South West Aboriginal Land & Sea Council. 2025.
- Kent, Melissa (24 November 2005). "Yagan centre of cover-up bid". The West Australian.
- Kimberly, Warren Bert, ed. (1897). "Chapter 9" . History of West Australia . Melbourne: F. W. Niven – via Wikisource.
- Lampathakis, Paul (6 March 2005). "Hunt for Yagan narrows". The Sunday Times.
- Lewis, Susan K., ed. (17 November 2005). "The Afterlife. An interview with Egyptologist Salima Ikram". NOVA: The Mummy Who Would Be King. WGBH Educational Foundation.
- "Aboriginal warrior Yagan is finally laid to rest after 170 years". Liverpool Echo. 8 May 2013.
- Lucev, Athanae (10 July 2010). "Yagan's head reburied in Swan Valley". The West Australian. Archived from the original on 23 August 2011.
- Maeder, Jay (4 September 1997). "The Newsreel". New York Daily News. Archived from the original on 6 November 2019.
- Martin, David L. (2007). "Of Monuments and Masks: Historiography in the Time of Curiosity's Ruin". Postcolonial Studies. 10 (3): 311–320. doi:10.1080/13688790701488197. S2CID 162435717.
- Mateer, John (2002). Loanwords. Fremantle: Fremantle Arts Centre Press. ISBN 1-86368-359-3.
- McGlade, Hannah (1998). "The Repatriation of Yagan: a Story of Manufaduring Dissent". Law Text Culture. 4 (1): 245–255. doi:10.14453/ltc.472. ISSN 1322-9060.
- McGlade, Hannah (2001). "Race Vilification Before the Human Rights and Equal Opportunity Commission". Indigenous Law Bulletin. 5 (7).
- McPhee, Lindsay (4 September 2008). "Head of Nyoongar warrior Yagan will be finally laid to rest in Swan Valley". The West Australian. p. 9.
- McPhee, Lindsay (19 November 2008). "Reburial of Yagan head is delayed". The West Australian (2nd ed.). p. 15.
- Monument Australia (2025). "Yagan Memorial Park". Monument Australia.
- Muecke, Stephen (2004). Ancient and Modern: Time, Culture and Indigenous Philosophy. UNSW Press. ISBN 0-86840-786-0. OCLC 58594532.
- Moreton, Romaine (n.d.). "Confessions of a Headhunter (2000) → Curator's notes". Australian Screen, National Film and Sound Archive of Australia.
- "Yagan's story". National Museum of Australia. 2 September 1997. Archived from the original on 22 November 2011.
- Nown, Graham; Rosthorn, Andrew (11 May 1997). "After 160 years, it's time for Yagan to go home". The Independent.
- "Depositions". The Perth Gazette and Western Australian Journal. Vol. 1, no. 21. Western Australia. 25 May 1833. p. 83 – via National Library of Australia.
- "The Native's [sic] Again!!". The Perth Gazette and Western Australian Journal. Vol. 1, no. 22. Western Australia. 1 June 1833. p. 87 – via National Library of Australia.
- "Native Corrobory at Perth". The Perth Gazette and Western Australian Journal. Vol. 1, no. 11. Western Australia. 16 March 1833. p. 42 – via National Library of Australia.
- "The Soldier Speared at Clarence". The Perth Gazette and Western Australian Journal. Vol. 1, no. 9. Western Australia. 2 March 1833. p. 34 – via National Library of Australia.
- "The Natives". The Perth Gazette and Western Australian Journal. Vol. 1, no. 29. Western Australia. 20 July 1833. pp. 114–115 – via National Library of Australia.
- Philip, Martin (26 June 2006). "Yagan waits for final resting place". The West Australian.
- Phillips, Harry; Black, David (1998). "Western Australia: July to December 1977". Australian Journal of Politics & History. 44 (2): 270–285. doi:10.1111/1467-8497.00018.
- Portmann, P.; Portmann, P. (1989). "Register of Australian Winter Cereal Cultivars. Hordeum vulgare (Barley) cv. Yagan". Australian Journal of Experimental Agriculture. 29 (1): 143. doi:10.1071/EA9890143.
- Reece, Robert Harold William (2019). "Yagan (1795–1833)". Australian Dictionary of Biography. National Centre of Biography, Australian National University. ISBN 978-0-522-84459-7. ISSN 1833-7538. OCLC 70677943.
- Riley, Sally; Weller, Archie (1999). Confessions of a Headhunter. Scarlett Pictures.
- SBS On Demand (n.d.). "Yagan (2013)". SBS On Demand. Special Broadcasting Service (SBS).
- Screen Australia (n.d.). "Yagan (2012)". Screen Australia.
- Shoemaker, Adam (2000). "The Headless State". Griffith Law Review. 9 (2): 358–370.
- Spagnolo, Joe (18 February 2018). "Yagan Square to open on March 3". Perth Now.
- "Archaeological Geophysics: Yagan's Head". University of St Andrews. 2005. Archived from the original on 12 March 2005.
- Turnbull, Paul (1998). "'Outlawed Subjects': The Procurement and Scientific Uses of Australian Aboriginal Heads, ca. 1803–1835". Eighteenth-Century Life. 22 (1): 156–171. S2CID 142764636.
- Wilkes, Richard (February 2010). "A Message from the Chairperson of the Derbarl Yerrigan Committee for the Reburial of Yagan's Kaat" (PDF). Yagan Memorial Park Newsletter: 2–3. Archived from the original (PDF) on 16 February 2011.
- Yagan Square (n.d.). "Wirin". Yagan Square. Government of Western Australia. Archived from the original on 11 March 2021.
