= Descriptive Account of the Panoramic View &c. of King George's Sound and the Adjacent Country =

Pamphlet by Robert Dale

Descriptive Account of the Panoramic View, &c. of King George's Sound, and the Adjacent Country
- Author: Robert Dale
- Language: English
- Published: 1834
- Publisher: J. Cross, R. Havell
- Publication place: Australia
- Pages: 19
- Text: Descriptive Account of the Panoramic View, &c. of King George's Sound, and the Adjacent Country at Wikisource

Descriptive account of the panoramic view, &c. of King George's Sound, and the adjacent country is a pamphlet written by Robert Dale in 1834, containing description and commentary on the Panoramic View of King George's Sound, Part of the Colony of Swan River, a panorama of King George's Sound painted by Robert Havell. Together with prints of the Panorama, it was sold to attendees of an exhibition given in the home of Thomas Pettigrew. Dale was an ensign in the 63rd Regiment of Foot, which was posted to Western Australia in 1829. He was assigned to the Surveyor-General's department, and thus spent his four years in the colony exploring and surveying

== Description ==
The booklet is twenty pages describing the region surrounding Mount Clarence, including the flora, fauna, geography, geology, and the original inhabitants, at the new founded colony in Western Australia. Other remarks regarding the southwest of the continent are also included in the text.

Robert Dale records the climate of the sound as "very fine", the temperature range and extremes are noted and compared with that of the Swan River Colony to the north. The topography of the region, from the coast to the Porrongurup Range, is described. At the right of panorama is a distant mountain range he identified as "Toolbrunnup". Areas of water within the harbour are distinguished from those of the ocean and the offshore "Islands of Breaksea and Michaelmas" are also named. The appearance of lakes and woods are also noted and mention is given to the Kalgan River and its immediate region. One area of cleared land in the image is noted as "Strawberry Hill", (Note: Currently the property of the National Trust of Australia.) the Government's attempt to establish a productive garden. An account of the new settlement, the viability of the country for agriculture and suitability for the production of wool, are presented as the text progresses.

Observations on the Nyungar people who inhabited the region, several of which are included within the painting, and their cultural practices were also described. Their use of the 'native dog' for kangaroo-hunting is briefly detailed. The author identifies a man in the painting as Nakinna and discusses his brother, and his method of burial, the man known as Mokaree.

Dale makes a general remark on the scarcity, and lack of beauty, of bird-life on the continent, but noted several ornamental birds found in the region. Of the other fauna he had this to say:

The animals that have been found consist of several kinds of the kangaroo and opossum—the native dog, which resembles the wolf or fox in shape—the dasyurus, a dark yellow animal with white spots, bearing some resemblance to the cat—and a small animal lately found in the interior about the size of a squirrel, or a yellowish colour, with light and dark shaded strips across the hinder parts of the back, and a tongue very long in proportion to the body.

Several of the plant genera of the region, Nuytsia, Banksia, Kingia and what is locally termed as the "Tea tree", are identified and appended with short remarks. The wood of 'the Mahogany' (Eucalyptus marginata) is given especial mention, noting the great extent of its forest and recognised value, and predicts that it would become an important export.

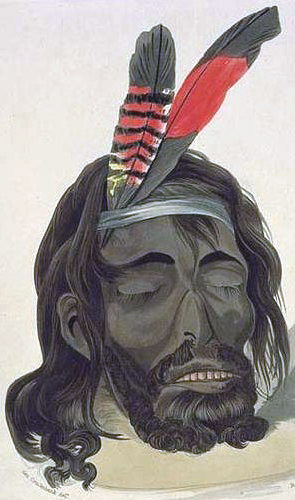
Head of Yagan by George Cruikshank, the frontispiece of the Descriptive Account

The author concludes the text with a discussion of the killing of Yagan, which occurred some 400 kilometres (250 mi) north at the Swan River Colony, and includes an image of that man's head. This hand-coloured aquatint portrait of Yagan by George Cruikshank was inserted as the frontispiece of the pamphlet. A letter from Pettigrew, detailing the results of a phrenological post mortem, was addressed to the author and appended as the last three pages.

== Background ==
The view is from one of two large hills that straddle the township later named Albany, that nearest the entrance (Note: Later named Atatürk's entrance, for the opposing commander of the Anzac Forces at Gallipoli.) to Princess Royal Harbour. Dale had brought Yagan's head to London, and had entered into an arrangement whereby Pettigrew was given the exclusive right to exhibit the head at his parties. Pettigrew in turn displayed the head in front of a copy of Dale's panorama, and encouraged his guests to buy a panorama as a souvenir of their evening.

Thus, if Dale's panorama is intended to depict racial harmony, its purpose was contradicted by the accompanying pamphlet. It has been suggested that Dale included the information on Yagan in order to support his friend, Lieutenant-Governor Frederick Chidley Irwin, who had returned to London along with Dale in order to justify the killing of Yagan to his superiors.
