= Charles Augustus John Symmons =

British official in southwest Australia (1804–1887)

Charles Augustus John Symmons (1804–1887) was an official of the British government posted at the Swan River Colony, assuming a role as "protector" and later police officer in the early decades of European settlement in Southwest Australia.

== Biography ==
Charles Symmons was born in 1804 to a privileged family, made destitute by a "reversal of fortune" in 1831. While not meeting the usual requirements of education or experience in administering religion or law, Symmons took advantage of family connections to receive a recommendation from the Earl of Clarendon for a position at the new colony.

His father's brother was Charles Symmons, a poet and scholar active in the Anglican clergy, and the Royal surgeon and scientist Anthony Carlisle was his brother-in-law. His impressive connections to upper classes of English society are likely to have increased his status in the small colony.

== Works ==
Symmons arrived at the colony on 12 December 1839, beginning a public service position at the town that would become the state of Western Australia's capital, Perth. His title was first announced as protector of Aboriginals, he summarised this period in 1848 as the application of a reward system,

The Protectors are most effectually advancing the best interests of their sable clients, by identifying themselves equally with those of the settlers, by protecting them from the aggressions of the [... Aboriginals], and thereby promoting a mutual reciprocity of good feeling.

His policies of "native management" are regarded as a notable departure from his predecessors and contemporary application of justice and protection. His job position was later changed to guardian of Aboriginals and protector of settlers. The appointment as Protector saw him take charge of two mounted officers with a contingent of eighteen indigenous men recruited as aides. Symmons was assisted by the colonist Francis Armstrong in the role of the town's constable and "native translator" and Peter Barrow, who had also been appointed in England and was posted to the eastern frontier of the settlement at York. The directives and payment of his salary were taken from funds provided by Lord Glenelg in England, in response to reports of violence presented in the British parliament, and to be implemented by the colony's governor John Hutt.

When Symmons assumed his role in 1840, the policies of extending law and order to the Aboriginal peoples included the use of Rottnest Island for detention of Aboriginal people. At the beginning of what would become a notorious prison system, the stated aim of Rottnest was the education of men deemed as insubordinate to accept the newly imposed social regulations and be employed as farm labourers. Symmons was able to sentence individuals he described as "untameable savages" to be transported to the island, visible just 20 kilometres (12 mi) offshore and greatly feared by the Nyungar peoples due to reports of conditions there. His positions in the Swan River colony's civil service included the Public Works board in 1849, immigration agent in 1856, acting sheriff at Champion Bay during 1861 to 1862, and resident magistrate and justice of the peace at Fremantle in 1868. He was an Acting Superintendent, effectively the head of law enforcement in the colony, from the beginning of March to the end of May in 1858; a briefly held position that advanced his career in the judiciary. Symmons' influence with the police came as recommendations for recruitment to their ranks, and he may have directly appointed new officers himself while serving as sheriff at Champion Bay. He retired as Police Magistrate at Fremantle in 1870.

Symmons recorded and assembled word lists of the Nyungar language in the course of his work. These were included in the important compilation A Descriptive Vocabulary of the Language in Common Use Amongst the Aborigines of Western Australia that was appended to publication of the colonist George Fletcher Moore's diaries.
