= A Descriptive Vocabulary of the Language in Common Use Amongst the Aborigines of Western Australia =

Book by George Fletcher Moore

A Descriptive Vocabulary of the Language in Common Use Amongst the [Aboriginals ...] of Western Australia
- Author: George Fletcher Moore
- Language: English
- Publisher: William S. Orr & Co.
- Publication date: 1842
- Publication place: England
- Media type: Print
- Text: A Descriptive Vocabulary of the Language in Common Use Amongst the [Aboriginals ...] of Western Australia at Wikisource

A Descriptive Vocabulary of the Language in Common Use Amongst the [Aboriginals ...] of Western Australia is a book by George Fletcher Moore. First published in 1842, it represents one of the earliest attempts to record the languages used by the Aboriginal peoples of Western Australia. The book is a compilation by Moore based on the works of Robert Lyon, Francis Armstrong, Charles Symmons, the Bussell family and George Grey, as well as his own observations. It was published in 1842 at the expense of Moore and Governor of Western Australia John Hutt. In 1884 it was republished as part of Moore's Diary of Ten Years Eventful Life of an Early Settler in Western Australia and also A Descriptive Vocabulary of the Language of the [Aboriginals ...]. (Note: Facsimile edition published in 1978 by Nedlands, Western Australia: University of Western Australia Press.)

The work is a key source in records of the nomenclature of Australia's Southwest flora and fauna. The compilation of regional variants in the Nyungar language is cited in Serventy and Whittell Birds of Western Australia and subsequent ornithological literature, although his own observations of bird-life remained unpublished until the 1884 edition of Moore's diary.

== General references ==
- Stannage, C. T. (1978). Introduction to Facsimile edition of Moore (1884).
- The full text of A Descriptive Vocabulary of the Language in Common Use Amongst the [Aboriginals ...] of Western Australia at Wikisource
