= Exhumation of Yagan's head =

1997 exhumation in Liverpool, England

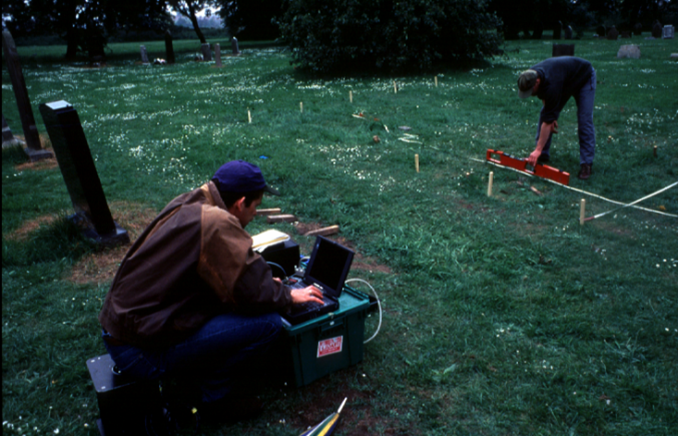
Martin and Richard Bates measuring ground conductivity at Yagan's grave site

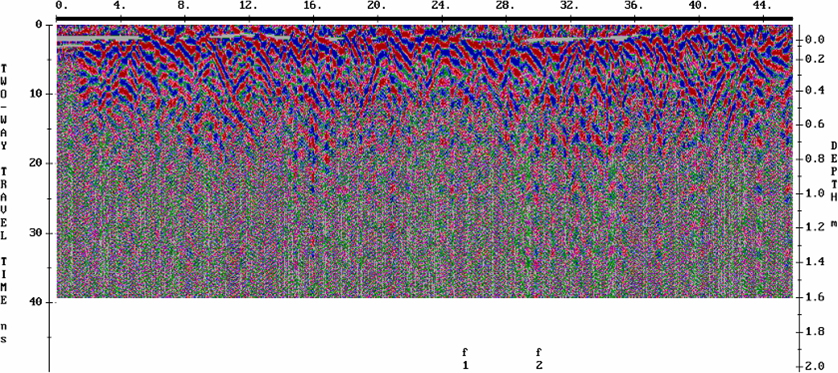
Ground penetrating radar provided no information about the location of Yagan's head

In 1997, a geophysical survey and archaeological dig took place in the Everton Cemetery, Liverpool, which led to the exhumation of the Aboriginal Australian Yagan's head. Yagan was an Noongar warrior who was murdered in 1833 by British colonists, due to his resistance to the colonial British settlements in the Swan River Colony in Western Australia.

== Background ==
Yagan was an Aboriginal Australian warrior of the Noongar nation who played a key part in early indigenous resistance to European settlement and rule around the area of Perth, Western Australia. He was shot dead by a young settler, James Keates in 1833. Yagan's head was removed, preserved by smoking, and taken to England by Robert Dale, who gave it to the Liverpool Institute for display in a museum.

By 1964, Yagan's head was badly decomposed, and the decision was made to dispose of it. The head was placed in a plywood box, along with a Peruvian mummy and a Māori head, and buried in Everton Cemetery's General Section 16, grave number 296. In later years, a number of burials were made around the grave, and in 1968 a local hospital buried 20 stillborn babies and two babies who had lived less than twenty-four hours, directly over the museum box.

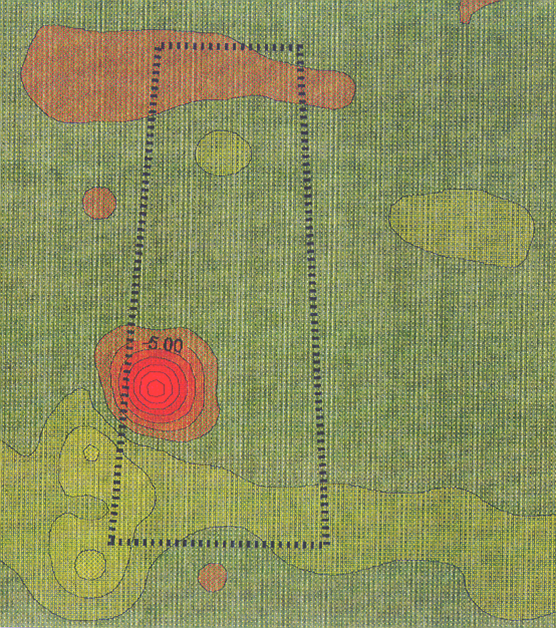
A horizontal colour contour map of ground conductivity of Yagan's grave site

For many years, members of Perth's Noongar community sought to have Yagan's head returned and buried according to tribal custom. An application for exhumation of the head was made in 1994, but it was refused because next of kin permission to disturb the remains of the twenty-two babies could not be obtained.

== The geophysical survey ==
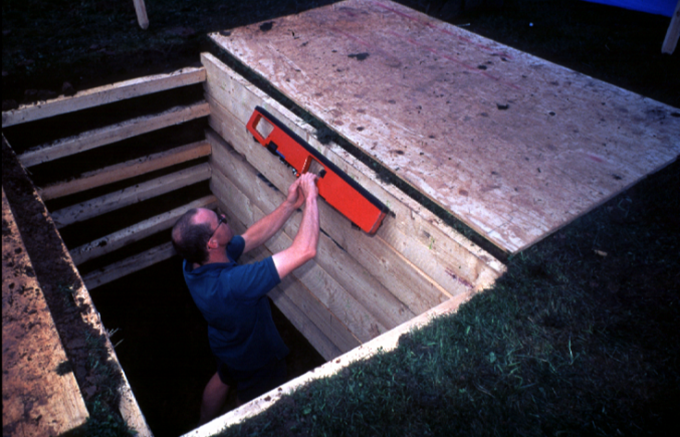
The excavation pit used for the exhumation of Yagan's head

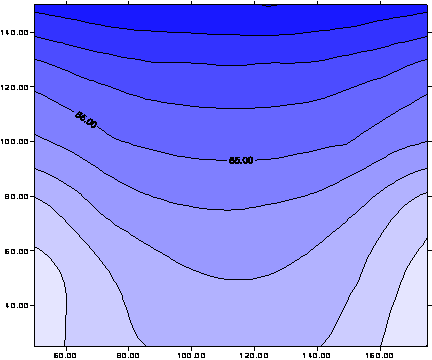
A vertical colour contour map of ground conductivity of Yagan's grave site

In 1997, two brothers, Martin Bates of the University of Wales, Lampeter and Richard Bates of the University of St Andrews, were commissioned by the Home Office to conduct a geophysical survey of the grave site, with a view to exhuming the remains via an adjacent plot without disturbing any other remains.

The pair conducted surface surveys using ground penetrating radar and ground conductivity techniques. The ground penetrating radar yielded no information about the location of Yagan's head, as the highly disturbed graveyard soil contained many reflecting sources. However, the ground conductivity measurements showed an anomaly in the electromagnetic signature that it was thought might be caused by metal artifacts buried with the head. The apparent location of the remains confirmed the feasibility of accessing them via an adjacent plot.

A pit was then dug in an adjacent plot, to a depth of around 1.8 metres (6 ft), and a vertical ground conductivity test was conducted from within the pit. This test failed to detect the anomaly recorded in the surface test, however the conductivity plot did show an anomaly at the centre of the grave, indicating that the grave was dug to its full depth of 2.7 metres (9 ft) only at its centre. This suggested the burial of a small box, confirming the memory of the grave digger who claimed to have constructed a small box to house the buried remains.

== The exhumation ==
After gathering evidence on the position and depth of Yagan's head, Bates reported the survey results to the Home Office, which eventually granted permission to proceed with the exhumation. Yagan's head was exhumed by tunnelling horizontally into the grave from the adjacent pit. The tunneling operation was "delicate and risky", as the tunnel passed underneath the remains of the babies, such that any collapse could potentially disturb them. According to Richard Bates, "the first shovel of dirt from the grave showed signs of the decayed box and the Peruvian mummy came next followed by the Māori head and finally Yagan's head".

The following day, a forensic palaeontologist from the University of Bradford positively identified the skull as Yagan's, by correlating the fractures with those described in an 1834 report by Thomas Pettigrew.

== Aftermath ==
Later that year, Yagan's head was handed over to a delegation of Noongars, who took it back to Australia. Reburial of the head was delayed, however, due to uncertainty of the whereabouts of the rest of his body and disagreement by elders about the importance of burying the head with the body. They finally buried it in July 2010, in a traditional Noongar ceremony in the Swan Valley in Western Australia, 177 years after Yagan's death.
