= Robert Hitchcock =

Australian sculptor (born 1944)

- Hitchcock standing next to one of his (larger than life) figures at the SAS Garden of Reflection, Perth, Western Australia
- Born: Robert Charles Hitchcock; 18 August 1944 (age 82); Perth, Western Australia, Australia
- Education: Perth Tech College
- Known for: sculpture, drawing
- Notable work: Figurative work, portrait busts, life-size sculptures, horses, abstract
- Movement: Bronze sculpture, modernism
- Website: https://sculpturerobertchitchcock.com

Robert Charles Hitchcock (born 18 August 1944) is an Australian sculptor. He commenced his career in 1970 and works in a wide variety of subjects and materials. Hitchcock is one of the leading portrait sculptors currently working in Australia today. He is known for his life size (and super life size) bronze sculptures which are located in private collections as well as public works of art in Australia and overseas.

== Early life ==
Hitchcock was born in Perth, Western Australia. He is of Irish and indigenous Australian descent. In his youth he worked as a carpenter and entered formal study in his early twenties at the Art Department of the Perth Tech College. Whilst he initially wanting to study fine painting in fine art, due to impaired vision (from an accident as a child) he had difficulty in seeing and mixing colours and realised that he had more of an affinity with three-dimensional art. The early sculptures of Hitchcock were exploratory in nature and diverse in technique and style. Subject matter tends towards realism and expressionism of the "continuity of movement in space" and the subjects themselves include natural forms, and realistic modelling of animals and figures in movement. Hitchcock later moved away from this early realism (which he sought to create in his sculptures) to a "more stylized and abstract search of forms and planes". After graduating in 1969 he worked in plaster factories (learning plaster piece moulding techniques), fibreglass factories and various bronze foundries.

== Professional career ==
His first commission came in 1970 of the champion race horse Aquanita, which competed in the Melbourne Cup in the early 1960s, and was a quarter life size. As Hitchcock's reputation grew he received a number of similar commissions from the equestrian industries including racing, pacing, polo and quarter horse racing. These early works led in later life to Hitchcock receiving commissions for over life size equestrian commissions in Norseman, Merredin and Moora, Western Australia as public works of art.

In the 1970s, Hitchcock began to receive increasingly significant recognition for his work. These include a series of sculptures of the Russian Ballet Dancer Rudolf Nureyev. Throughout his career he has created sculptures of prominent and (in his own words) "interesting people". These include Leonard Cohen, Rod McKuen, Professor Ian Constable, Beethoven, Robbie Burns (for the Robbie Burns Society) and many prominent Australian public and sporting figures.

Towards the end of the 1970s Hitchcock bronzes took on a larger scale, which was particularly suited for public art commissions – the most significant of which is, almost certainly, his sculpture of Yagan. From the mid-1970s, members of the Noongar community lobbied for the erection of a statue of Yagan as part of the WAY 1979 sesquicentennial celebrations. Their requests were refused, however, after the Premier, Charles Court was advised by one prominent historian that Yagan was not important enough to warrant a statue. The Noongar community then established a Yagan Committee and eventually raised sufficient funds to commission Hitchcock to create a statue. The result was a life-size statue in bronze, depicting Yagan standing naked with a spear held across his shoulders. Hitchcock's statue of Yagan was officially opened by Yagan Committee chairperson Elizabeth Hanson on 11 September 1984. It stands on Heirisson Island in the Swan River near Perth.

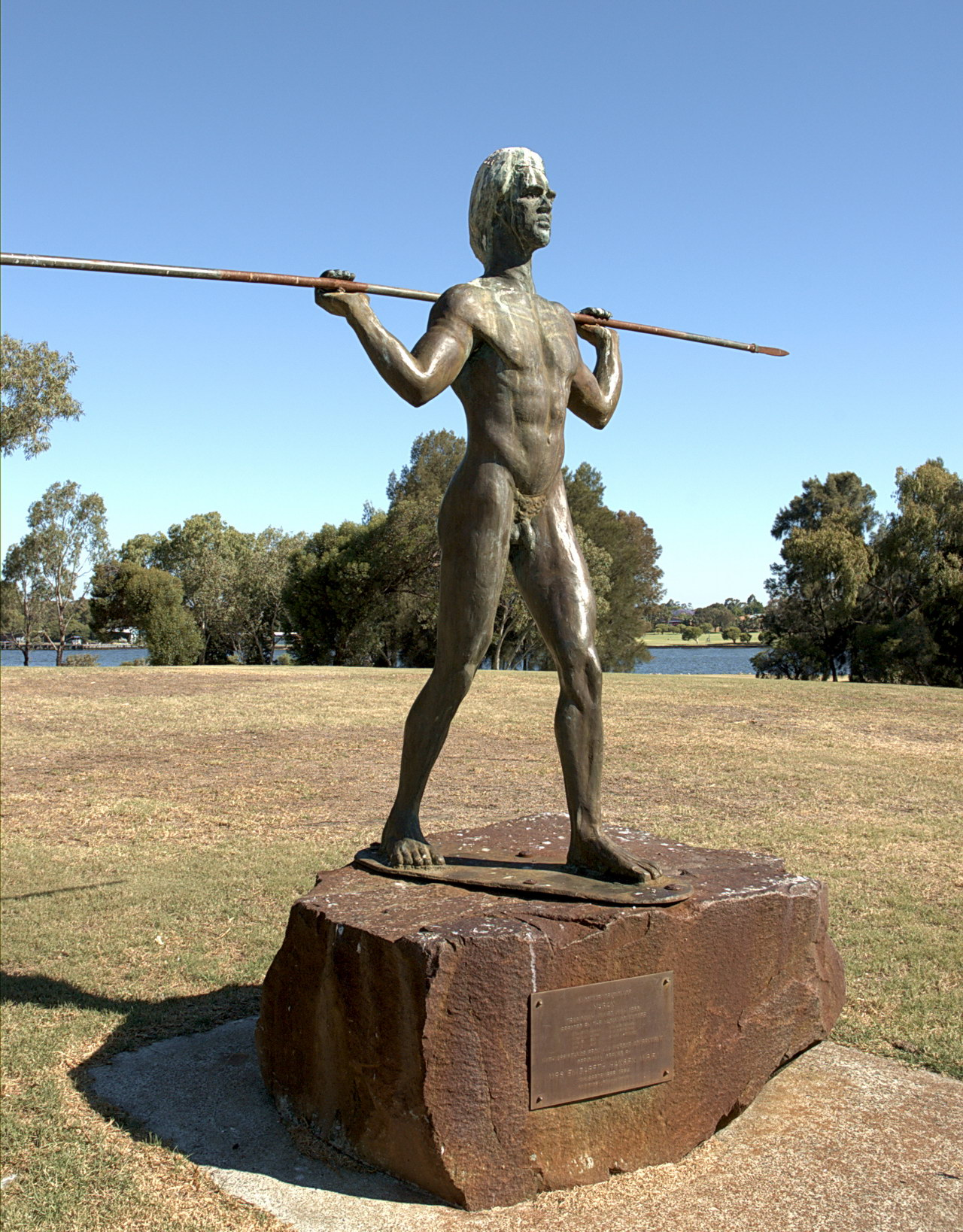
Yagan statue, Heirisson Island

Hitchcock moved into his larger studio (which he currently works from) in 2000. A recent high-profile commission was for the SAS Garden of Reflection in Perth. This consists of three larger than life size SAS figures in various uniforms from 1957 (the inception of the SAS in Australia) with the remaining two in modern combat uniform and weapons. These commissions are highly accurate in detail and give a true representation of the Australia SAS soldier.

One of the three SAS sculptures by Hitchcock at the "Garden of Reflection", Perth WA
