= William Havell =

English painter (1782–1857)

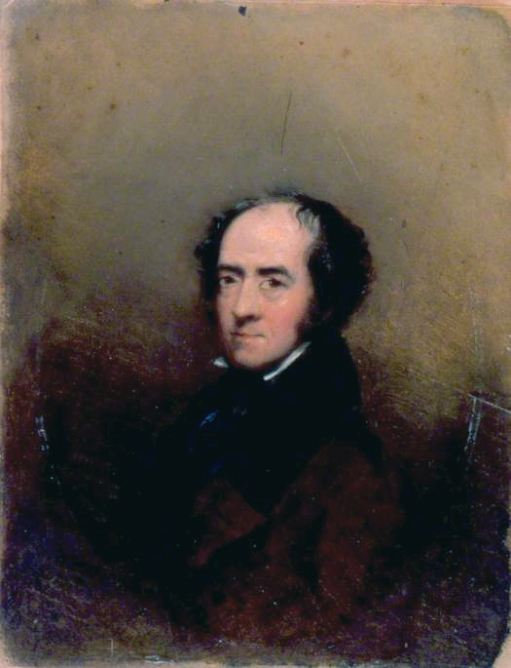
Self portrait (1838)

William Havell (9 February 1782 – 16 December 1857) was an English landscape painter, one of the Havell family of artists, and a founding member of the Society of Painters in Watercolours.

== Life and work ==
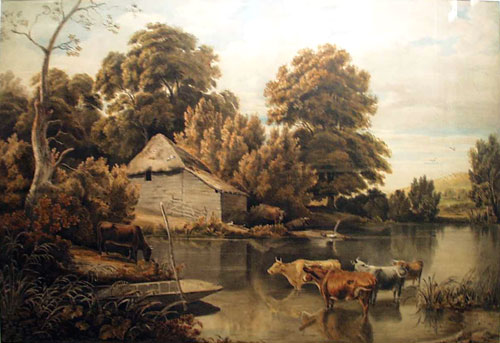
Hedsor Wharf (1812).

Havell was born in Reading in Berkshire, one of fourteen children, the son of Luke Havell, a drawing master, who also kept a small shop to eke out his narrow means. He attended Reading Grammar School – where his father taught art. Although his father was initially reluctant to encourage his son in his choice of career – knowing from personal experience the potential financial hardship involved – he was won over by William's obvious talent, and funded a sketching trip to Wales, which proved to be an invaluable training ground.

In 1804 William sent his first contribution to the Royal Academy – a view of Carnarvon Castle and another of the valley of Nant Ffrancon valley in Wales. In the same year he became one of the founding members of the Society of Painters in Watercolours. In 1807 he went to Ambleside (in the Lake District) where he stayed about two years, studying mountain scenery and producing many fine works. In 1813 he seceded from the Watercolour Society, but under a then existing rule continued to contribute to their exhibitions, as well as to the Royal Academy, where he exhibited in 1812 and 1814.

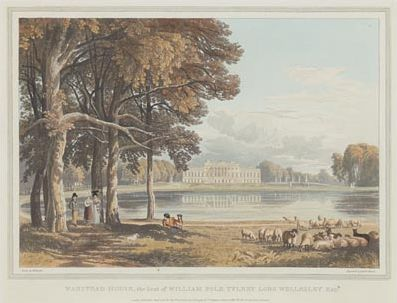
Wanstead House (1815).

In 1816 Havell was engaged in painting a series of pictures called 'Picturesque Views and Characteristic Scenery of British Villas', when he was appointed to the post of draughtsman with Lord Amherst's embassy to China. As a result of a serious quarrel on board ship with one of the officers, his position became untenable and he left the post, sailing to India in 1817. There he stayed until 1825, finding lucrative employment in painting portraits and landscapes. On his return he rejoined the Watercolour Society, but found that his work was not as popular as it once had been, and after a while be ceased to contribute to their exhibitions and took to painting in oils instead.

In 1827, Havell travelled to Italy with Thomas Uwins (1782–1857), visiting Florence, Rome, and Naples. He became a frequent exhibitor at the Royal Academy, his subjects being chiefly Italian, but sometimes from Wales, Westmoreland, and China. He also exhibited at the British Institution and Suffolk Street. Although his works were of great merit and distinguished by pure and delicate colour, they failed to attract the public, and having lost his savings by the failure of an Indian bank, he became a pensioner on the Royal Academy's Turner Fund.

Havell died, after some years of declining health, at Kensington, London, on 16 December 1857, and was buried at Kensal Green Cemetery.

=== Family ===
Three of Havell's brothers were also artists of note. George Havell (d. 1839?) was an animal painter, and attempted engraving and sculpture. Edmund Havell was an occasional exhibitor at the Royal Academy, and he succeeded his father as drawing-master at Reading – his son, Edmund Havell the younger (b. 1819), was a well-known artist. Frederick James Havell (1801–1840), the third brother, practised line engraving and mezzotint, and made experiments in photography.

== Appraisal ==
Havell was one of the best of the earlier painters in water-colour, and did much to advance this art, and his pictures in oil, though neglected during his lifetime, have risen greatly in estimation. Between 1804 and 1857 he exhibited 103 landscapes at the Royal Academy, 42 at the British Institution and 32 at Suffolk Street. James described his works as "remarkable for good composition and often for the effect of sunshine". The Redgraves described his oil paintings as "having much excellence...well-composed and arranged...".
