= Dean Alston =

Australian cartoonist

- Born: 1950 (age 75–76) South Perth, Western Australia, Australia
- Awards: 1991 Walkley Award

Dean John Douglas Alston (born 1950) is an Australian cartoonist who became the editorial cartoonist of The West Australian newspaper in 1986.

== Biography ==
Dean Alston was born in South Perth, Western Australia. He grew up in Mount Pleasant and attended Applecross Senior High School. In 1967 he started a cadetship in cartography with Western Australia's Lands and Surveys Department. In 1980, he bought into the Carine Glades Tavern. He travelled to London via New Zealand and the US, working for British Gas as a cartographer, illustrator and caricaturist. In 1985, Alston was employed by The West Australian. He took over as editorial cartoonist the following year. As of February 2016, he is estimated to have published over 14,000 cartoons. He has won numerous awards, including a Walkley Award for Best Cartoon in 1991 and Stanley Awards for Best Single Gag cartoon in 2003 and 2012.

== Controversy ==
The final two frames of Alas Poor Yagan by Dean Alston

In September 1997 The West Australian published an Alston cartoon entitled Alas Poor Yagan, which criticised the fact that the return of Yagan's head had become a source of conflict among the Indigenous Australians of Western Australia, instead of fostering unity. The cartoon could also be interpreted as casting aspersions on the motives and legitimacy of named indigenous people who were humorously identified with mixed racial heritage. The content of the cartoon offended many Aboriginal people. The elder Robert Bropho levelled accusations of racism against The West Australian. Eventually the Human Rights and Equal Opportunity Commission ruled that the cartoon made inappropriate references to Noongar beliefs but did not breach racial discrimination law. This ruling was upheld on appeal by the Federal Court of Australia.
