= Diary of George Fletcher Moore =

Diary of early settler in Western Australia

Diary of Ten Years Eventful Life of an Early Settler in Western Australia, the best known publication of Moore's diary

The diary of George Fletcher Moore is an important record of early colonial life in Western Australia, because it is one of a few records that were written from the point of view of an ordinary colonist, as opposed to the official correspondence of a salaried public official. Tom Stannage describes the diary as "an immensely valuable social document" and "the best published guide we have to life in Swan River colony between 1830 and 1840."

== Background ==
Moore was an Irish lawyer who settled in the Swan River Colony in 1830, the colony's second year. He describes his decision to keep a journal as follows:

My friends were doubtful as to the prudence of such a hazardous step, but I reconciled them to it by a solemn promise that I would keep them fully informed, by each available opportunity in my power, of every incident and circumstance of my position and life there, whether good or bad, and leave them to judge of my success or failure. This was the cause of the 'Diary or Journal'.... It was written solely for the information and satisfaction of my father, brothers, sisters, and immediate friends in this country.

Moore's handwritten diary for the period from 1834 to 1841 is extant, and is held by the State Library of Western Australia.

== Editions ==
Portions of Moore's letters and diary have been published a number of times. The letters from 1830 to mid-1833 were published in 1834 as Extracts from the Letters and Journals of George Fletcher Moore, now filling a judicial office at the Swan River Settlement. Publication was at the request of Moore's father Joseph, and may have been without George Fletcher Moore's knowledge.

In the early 1880s, Moore's letters fell into the hands of Sir Thomas Cockburn Campbell, editor of The West Australian newspaper. Cockburn Campbell sought and received Moore's permission to publish them in The West. The letters appeared in serial during 1881 and 1882, and a copy of each issue was sent to Moore, who kept a scrapbook of them. In 1884, Moore decided to publish them afresh, together with a reprint of his 1842 A Descriptive Vocabulary of the Language of the Aboriginals. These were published under the title Diary of Ten Years Eventful Life of an Early Settler in Western Australia. Commonly referred to by the shorter title Diary of Ten Years, this is the best known edition of Moore's diary.

In 2006, Hesperian Press issued a version of Moore's diary and letters carefully edited and annotated by James Cameron under the title The Millendon Memoirs: George Fletcher Moore's Western Australian Diaries and Letters, 1830-1841.
