= Ken Colbung =

Aboriginal Australian leader

Kenneth Desmond Colbung AM MBE (2 September 1931 – 12 January 2010), also known by his indigenous name Nundjan Djiridjarkan, was an Aboriginal Australian leader from the Noongar people who became prominent in the 1960s. He was appointed an MBE and an AM for his service to the Aboriginal community.

== Life ==
Colbung was born on the Moore River Native Settlement. His mother died when he was six, and he was then taken to live at Sister Kate's Home for Children. He worked for a time as a stockman. He joined the Australian Army in 1950, and served in Japan and in the Korean War.

He was made a Justice of the Peace in 1980. Amongst his positions, Colbung was also deputy chairperson (1978-1984) and then chair (1984-1990) of the Australian Institute of Aboriginal and Torres Strait Islander Studies. He also had close links with the Western Australian Museum, and worked with them on their representations of Aboriginal issues for over thirty years.

He died after a short illness on 12 January 2010. He was 78.

== Activism ==
Colbung campaigned for the recognition of cultural and human rights for Aboriginal Australians, and was involved in the Australian Black Power Movement of the 1960s. He was instrumental in the development of the Aboriginal Heritage Act 1972 for the protection and preservation of material of cultural significance.

In 1979, Colbung presented state governor Wallace Kyle with a "notice to quit" during the opening of the WAY 79 celebrations of Western Australia's sesquicentenary. The notice "called on the Governor to quit and deliver up possession of Western Australia to the Aboriginal people".

Colbung became particularly known for his leading role in ensuring that the severed head of his ancestor, the Noongar warrior Yagan, was repatriated from Britain to Australia in 1997.
