= Hannah McGlade =

Australian lawyer, academic, and human rights advocate

Hannah McGlade FAHA
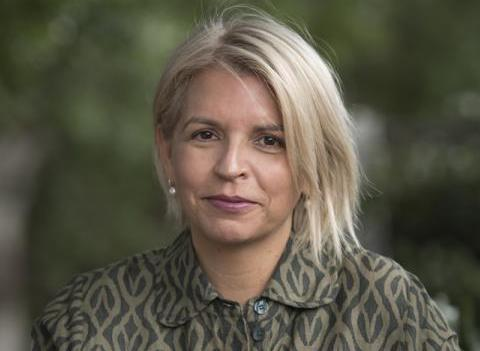
- Born: 1969 (age 56–57); Perth, Western Australia

Academic background
- Education: Murdoch University (LL.B., LL.M.); Curtin University (PhD)
- Thesis: Aboriginal child sexual assault (CSA) and the criminal justice system: the last frontier (2010/2011)
- Doctoral advisor: Linda Briskman

Academic work
- Discipline: Indigenous Australian studies
- Sub-discipline: Indigenous human rights; Indigenous law; Racial discrimination law
- Institutions: Curtin University

Member of the United Nations Permanent Forum on Indigenous Issues for the Pacific
- In office 1 January 2020 – 31 December 2025

Hannah McGlade CF (born 1969) is an Indigenous Australian academic, human rights advocate and lawyer. She is a Kurin Minang Noongar woman of the Bibulman nation and is as of May 2022 an associate professor at Curtin University's law school. She was appointed Senior Indigenous Fellow at the Office of the United Nations High Commissioner for Human Rights in 2016 and was a member of the United Nations Permanent Forum on Indigenous Issues from 2020 to 2025.

== Early life and education ==
Hannah McGlade was born in 1969 in Perth, Western Australia. She is a Kurin Minang Noongar woman of the Bibulman nation, an Aboriginal Australian people whose traditional lands are located on the southwestern coast of Western Australia.

At Murdoch University, McGlade completed a Bachelor of Laws in 1995 (making her the first Aboriginal woman to graduate from this university and the first to graduate from any Western Australian law school). She was admitted as a solicitor and barrister of the Supreme Court of Western Australia in 1996.

She earned a Master of Laws in 2001.

In 2011 she received her Doctor of Philosophy for her thesis, Aboriginal child sexual assault (CSA) and the criminal justice system: the last frontier, under doctoral adviser Linda Briskman. The thesis won the Australian Institute of Aboriginal and Torres Strait Islander Studies (AIATSIS) Stanner Award, which is "presented biennially to the best academic manuscript submitted by an Aboriginal or Torres Strait Islander author". Due to this win, the thesis was published as a book in 2012 with the title Our Greatest Challenge: Aboriginal children and human rights.

== Academic career ==
In 2016, she was appointed Senior Indigenous Research Fellow at Curtin, and is as of May 2022 an associate professor at Curtin Law School.

In 2020, she received a Churchill Fellowship to research the Indigenous Sámi Parliaments of Finland, Norway and Sweden.

== Advocacy ==
McGlade has often acted as an advocate for Indigenous Australians, especially focussing on issues relating to law, sexual assault, women's justice and systemic discrimination.

In 2002, she brought then-federal senator Ross Lightfoot to court for racial discrimination after he commented that Aboriginal Australians were "the most primitive race on earth". She was successful, and Lightfoot was charged with breaching the Racial Discrimination Act 1975.

In 2016, McGlade began campaigning for a stand-alone national action plan to address violence against women, and her advocacy was successful before a number of UN treaty bodies and expert mechanisms. In 2020 she called for a Council on Violence Against Aboriginal Women and Children in collaboration with the national body Our Watch (founded by Natasha Stott Despoja in 2013). In June 2021 the Morrison government established a National Plan Advisory Group headed by Marise Payne, Minister for Women, to "inform the development of the National Plan to end family, domestic and sexual violence in Australia".

Her advocacy for Aboriginal women and children over decades led to the establishment of the first service in Perth for victims, named Djinda. She was later the first CEO of the newly established Aboriginal Family Law Services.

She has also spoken out strongly against the destruction of a sacred site at Juukan Gorge which occurred in 2020, claiming that "governments and mining companies are causing harm to land" and that "now more than ever we should listen to Aboriginal people who want to protect land and culture." While a cultural heritage bill was proposed in Western Australian Parliament in 2021 which attempted to prevent such situations in the future, McGlade rejected its legitimacy and claimed Indigenous people had not been sufficiently consulted on the issue. With four other Indigenous people, she asked the United Nations Committee on the Elimination of Racial Discrimination to review the bill, claiming it contradicted Australia's international obligations regarding racial discrimination.

Also in 2021, she voiced concerns about Bruce Pascoe's book Dark Emu, saying that it was "ideological and subjective", "not very truthful or accurate" and "misleading and offensive to Aboriginal people and culture".

== Other roles ==
She was appointed Senior Indigenous Fellow at the Office of the United Nations High Commissioner for Human Rights in Geneva in 2016. She assists the Expert Mechanism on the Rights of Indigenous Peoples (EMRIP) there.

Sha was a member of the United Nations Permanent Forum on Indigenous Issues representing the Pacific from 2020 to 2025.

== Recognition and awards ==
- 1996: West Australian NAIDOC Student of the Year Award
- 2008: WA NAIDOC Outstanding Achievement Award
- 2011: AIATSIS' Stanner Award for her PhD thesis
- 2020: Churchill Fellowship
- 2020: WA NAIDOC Outstanding Achievement Award
- 2026: elected Fellow of the Australian Academy of the Humanities
