= Robert Dale (explorer) =

English army officer and explorer

- Born: November 1810; Winchester, England
- Died: 20 July 1853 (aged 42); Bath, England
- Occupations: Army officer, explorer of Western Australia, surveyor, timber merchant

Lieutenant Robert Dale (1810 – 20 July 1853) was the first European explorer to cross the Darling Range in Western Australia.

Robert Dale was born in Winchester, England in November 1810, son of Major Thurston Dale and Helen Matthews. Through the influence of his great-uncle General William Dyott, on 25 October 1827, he was appointed an ensign in the British Army's 63rd Regiment of Foot. In February 1829 Dale embarked for the Swan River Colony on HMS Sulphur as part of a detachment of troops commanded by Captain Frederick Chidley Irwin, arriving 6 June 1829. On arrival at the colony, he was seconded as an assistant to Surveyor General John Septimus Roe, whose Survey Department was suffering under an extreme workload. Dale spent four years with the Survey Department, surveying, clearing roads, and exploring. He was the first European to cross the Darling Range, where he discovered the fertile Avon Valley and explored the future locations of Northam, Toodyay, York and Beverley. He was also the first European to see and describe the numbat.

In November 1832 Dale purchased a vacated lieutenancy, but the following year returned to England. He took with him the smoked head of Yagan, a Noongar Aboriginal who had been ambushed and killed by a young settler. He remained on leave until he sold his commission in 1835. The sale of his commission, along with £500 (equivalent to £54,926 in 2025) inherited from his grandfather who had died in January 1835, enabled Dale to set himself up as a timber merchant in Liverpool in November 1835. He became involved in promoting the use of the Western Australian timber jarrah. He died of tuberculosis in Bath on 20 July 1853.

Mount Dale, one of the highest points in the Darling Range, to the south of Mundaring Weir, is named after him. The Dale River, a tributary of the Avon River, is also named after him, as is Ensign Dale Place in Northam, Western Australia.

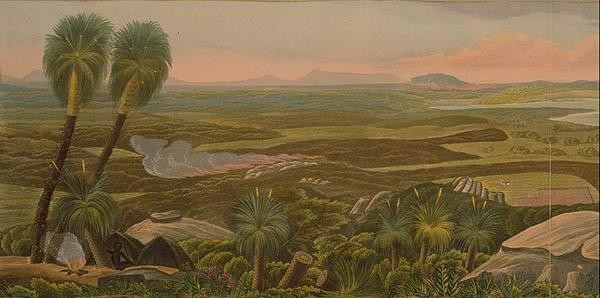
A portion of Panoramic View of King George's Sound, Part of the Colony of Swan River, based on sketches by Robert Dale and published in 1834

The Panoramic View of King George's Sound, Part of the Colony of Swan River, a 2.7-metre-long (9 ft) hand-colored aquatint panorama of Albany after sketches by Dale, was published in 1834 by Robert Havell.

== Sources ==
- Cross, Joseph, ed. (1833). Journals of Several Expeditions Made in Western Australia, during the years 1829, 1830, 1831, and 1832; under the Sanction of the Governor, Sir James Stirling, Containing the Latest Authentic Information Relative to That Country, Accompanied by a Map (PDF). Holborn: Joseph Cross. Wikidata Q19113848.
  - Dale, Robert (1833a). "Journal of an Expedition under the direction of Ensign Dale, to the Eastward of the Darling Mountains, in August, 1831". In Cross (1833), pp. 51–61.
  - Dale, Robert (1833b). "Journal of another Expedition to the Eastward of the Darling Range, under the direction of Ensign Dale; commenced on the 25th October, and concluded on the 7th November, 1830". In Cross (1833), pp. 62–72.
