= Robert Menli Lyon =

Early advocate for Aboriginal rights and welfare

Robert Menli Lyon (born Robert Milne; 1789–1874) was a Scottish-born Australian settler who became one of the earliest outspoken advocates for Indigenous Australian rights and welfare in the colony. He published the first information on the Aboriginal language of the Perth area.

== Early life ==
Lyon was born in Inverness, Scotland. He is thought to have had a career in the army in his youth and probably attained the military rank of captain. In 1829, at the age of about forty, Milne immigrated to what was then the British colony of Western Australia. During his time in Western Australia, Milne made no claim to military rank, initially preferring to be known simply as Robert Milne. Shortly after his arrival, he adopted the name Robert Menli Lyon, Menli being an anagram of Milne.

== Aboriginal contact ==
Lyon travelled widely in the colony and had friendly contact with the local Aboriginals. He saw the mistrust, hostility and sometimes violence with which the frontier settlers treated the Aboriginals and became an outspoken defender of their rights. He spoke in their defence at a number of public meetings, arguing against proposed punitive expeditions and other violent measures and instead proposing policies of negotiation and conciliation. His stance alienated him from many settlers and he became a target of hostility himself.

== The Yagan incident ==
Beginning about December 1831, a Noongar named Yagan had been leading a number of attacks on settlers in retaliation for the killing of one of his friends. In October 1832, Yagan and two of his compatriots were captured and sentenced to death. However, Lyon interceded, arguing that the men were fighting for their country and comparing their actions to those of William Tell and William Wallace. Therefore, he argued, they were not common criminals but prisoners of war and entitled to be treated as such. Governor James Stirling then agreed not to execute the men, instead exiling them to Carnac Island.

Lyon was granted access to the prisoners and spent a little over a month on Carnac Island with them. He used much of that time in an effort to learn Yagan's language. He discovered the names of many local geographic features and acquired knowledge about the Noongars' culture and traditions. This information was published in a series of editions of the Perth Gazette in March 1833, under the title A Glance at the Manners and Language of Aboriginal Inhabitants of Western Australia. It was the first information of its kind published in Western Australia and remains a valuable resource for anthropologists.

Lyon remained on Carnac Island from 8 October until 15 November 1832, when Yagan and a companion stole an unattended dinghy and escaped to the mainland. On reporting to the governor, Lyon asserted that if he had had three more weeks with Yagan, he might have been able to negotiate a treaty between the natives and the settlers. He urged the governor to pursue a treaty, rather than continuing hostilities. His advocacy against the use of force made him increasingly unpopular with settlers and the government. In retrospect, it also revealed his misunderstanding of Aboriginal culture, whose tribes acknowledged no leaders with whom a binding treaty might be negotiated.

In June 1833, a meeting was called at Guildford in response to continued calls for punitive action against the Aboriginals. Lyon attended and delivered "one of the most distinguished humanitarian speeches delivered in colonial Australia".

== Influence ==
In March 1834, Lyon left Western Australia for Mauritius, where he became professor of Latin and Greek at the College of Port Louis. On 25 April 1834, a notice was published in the Perth Gazette that Lyon had applied for permission to leave the Swan River Colony from Colonial Secretary Peter Broun. While there, he met James Backhouse, the Quaker, who heard him speak about the treatment of the Aboriginals in Western Australia. Backhouse was very impressed with Lyon, who elaborated his ideas in two papers on the subject that Backhouse received from him. These were rediscovered over a century later and eventually published in London in 1941 by the Aboriginal Protection Board.

== Writings ==
By 1838, Lyon had returned to Australia. He spent some of the year in South Australia using the title Reverend R. L. Milne. In 1839, he settled in New South Wales where he was known as Captain Robert Milne. There, he wrote and published a book entitled Australia: An Appeal to the World on Behalf of the Younger Branch of the Family of Shem under the name Robert Menli Lyon. The book included most of Lyon's previous articles, speeches and letters, supplemented by a collection of rhetorical letters pleading the cause of the Aboriginals. These letters were addressed to various authority figures, including members of the British royal family, the British Parliament, the Governor of New South Wales and the Bishop of Australia. Lyon maintained his interest in Aboriginal welfare for many years; he was in his mid-seventies when still writing on the subject as late as 1863.

== General references ==
- Hasluck, Alexandra (1961). "Yagan the Patriot". Early Days. V (VII).
