= Havell family =

The Havell family of Reading, Berkshire, England, included a number of notable engravers, etchers and painters, as well as writers, publishers, educators, and musicians. In particular, members of this family were among the foremost practitioners of aquatint; and had a long association with Indian art and culture. The family first came to notice through the brothers Luke Havell (drawing master, 1752?–1810) and Robert Havell the Elder (engraver and publisher, 1769–1832); along with their nephew Daniel Havell (engraver, 1786–1822).

== Luke Havell ==
Luke Havell, born 1752, was lifted from a future life as a farmhand when a local squire recognised his talents and apprenticed him to a signwriter named Ayliffe Cole, from 1762 to 1764. He was appointed drawing-master at Reading Grammar School, where he served under the headmastership of Richard Valpy, and also had a small print shop in the town. He married Charlotte Phillips in 1778, and together they had fourteen children, including the painter William Havell (1782–1857), and Edmund Havell (1785–1864) who took on the print shop, and succeeded his father as drawing master at the school.

== Robert Havell Sr. ==
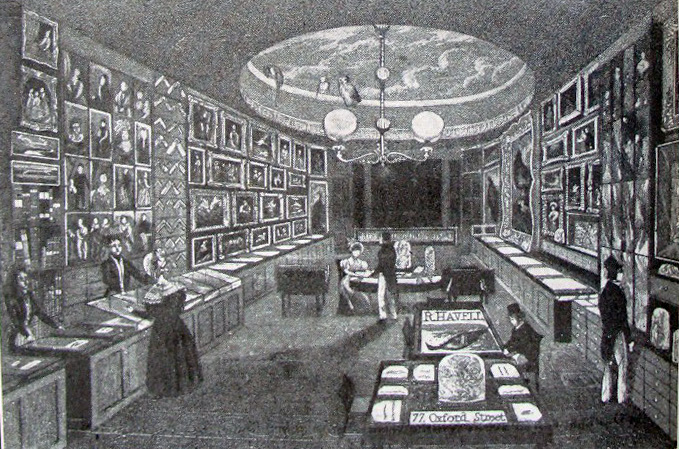
Robert Havell Jr.'s shop, The Zoological Gallery, at 77 Oxford Street, London (opened in 1831)

Robert Havell Sr. (29 December 1769 – 21 November 1832) was the proprietor of a printing and engraving shop, with an ancillary business in natural history artefacts, in the Marylebone district of London, in the early decades of the nineteenth century. Robert was the brother of Luke Havell, and named as such in Luke's will; another brother, William, a butcher, was buried in Reading in 1832. In February 1793 Robert married Lydia Miller Phillips at St Sepulchre church in London; their eldest son Robert was born in Reading in December the same year.

By 1801 Havell was established at 3 Chapel Street, off Tottenham Court Road, in London, giving his occupation as "artist". The business, known from 1818 to 1825 as Havell and Son, became well known for its expertise in aquatint engraving and colouring.

In 1824, following the marriage of his son, Robert moved the business to 79 Newman Street, where John James Audubon approached him in 1827 to engrave a portfolio of 240 drawings he had brought with him from America. Recognizing that without the help of another expert engraver he would not be able to take on a work of this magnitude, Robert Havell Sr. contacted his son, Robert Havell Jr., who had quarrelled with his father and left London in an attempt to launch an independent artistic career. Robert Havell Jr. consented to reestablish the partnership with his father and agreed to engrave the plates of Audubon's drawings, with Robert Sr. supervising their printing and colouring. The collaboration between father and son continued in this way until Robert Havell Sr.'s retirement in 1828.

Robert died in 1832, and was buried at the Old St. Pancras Church graveyard in London.

== Daniel Havell ==
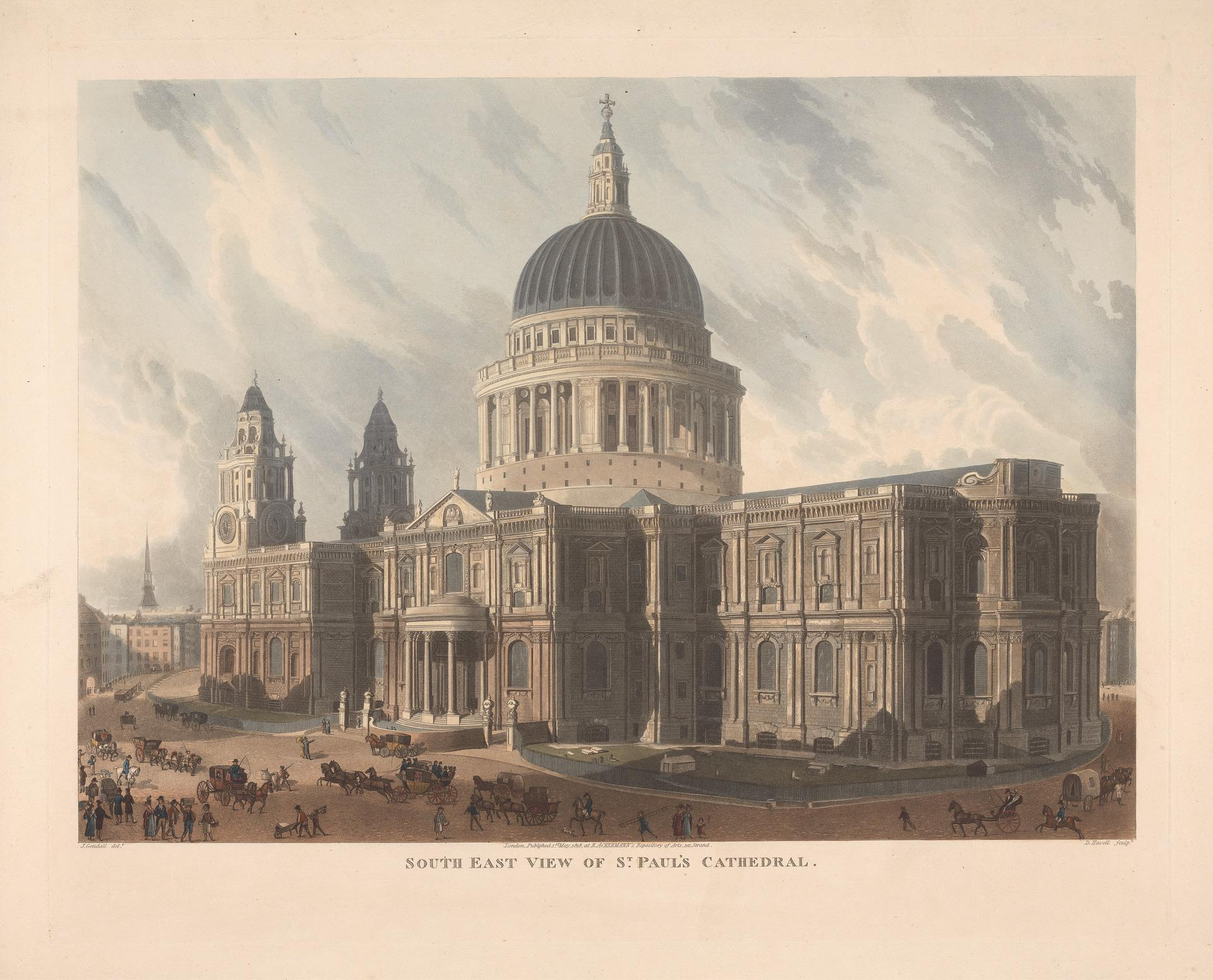
South East View of St. Paul's Cathedral, aquatint engraved by Daniel Havell, 1818, after painting by John Gendall. Published by Ackermann

In older texts (and in the current Oxford Dictionary of National Biography), Daniel Havell is often claimed as the father of Robert (and sometimes of Luke as well); but more recent references generally place him as born in 1785, the son of Luke's brother Thomas, also a painter, who was born in 1762. Daniel moved to London, and set up in partnership as an aquatint engraver with Robert Havell. Together they published aquatints of Twenty Four Views Taken in St. Helena (1809–10) after pictures by Henry Salt, and Twelve Picturesque Views of the River Thames (1812) from watercolours by William Havell. But the partnership did not last, and soon Daniel was working independently, including plates for Rudolph Ackermann's History of Cambridge (1815) and Ackermann's history of various Public Schools including Eton, Winchester and Rugby (1816), as well as a celebrated view of St Paul's Cathedral (1818) and various other London landmarks for Ackermann's Repository of Arts. Other subjects included topographical views of Devon, and of North Wales; and views of naval engagements. Havell's final work was for E.W. Brayley's Historical and descriptive accounts of the theatres of London (1826) "illustrated with a view of each theatre, elegantly coloured, drawn and engraved by the late Daniel Havell."

The Daniel Havell who was the son of Thomas Havell was baptised on 30 November 1786 at St Mary's, Reading; married Maria Alice Wilmot (1796-1873), daughter of Dr. Samuel and Martha (née Russell) Wilmot on 5 June 1813 at St James's in Paddington; and was buried on 19 May 1822 at Kingston upon Thames, his occupation given as "artist". His widow married artist John Gendall (1790-1865).

== Robert Havell Jr. ==
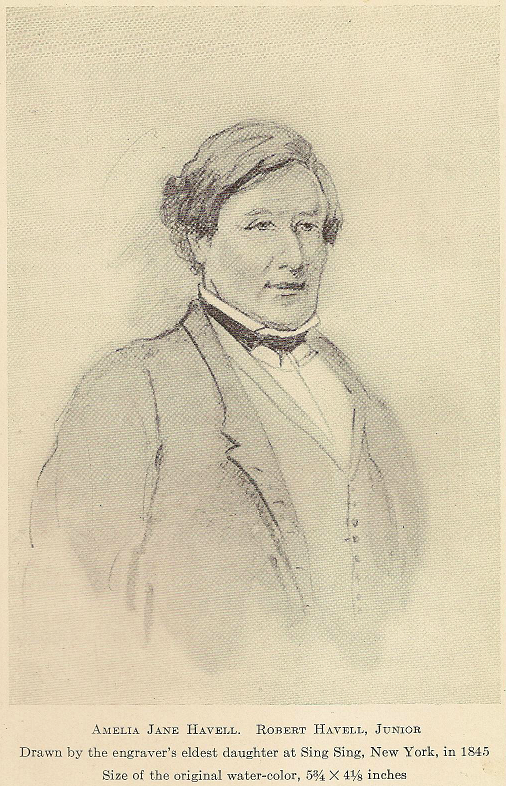
Robert Havell Jr., 1845

Robert Havell Jr. (25 November 1793 – 11 November 1878) was the principal engraver of Audubon's Birds of America, seen in America as "perhaps the most significant natural history publication of all time". His aquatint engraving of all but the first ten plates of John James Audubon's Birds of America is now recognised as a significant artistic achievement in its own right and an essential component of the success of Birds of America. He and Audubon became close friends and associates during their lengthy collaboration. In 1839 Havell went to America at the invitation of Audubon, first residing in Brooklyn. He settled in Ossining on the Hudson River and later moved to Tarrytown, New York, living there from 1857 through his remaining years. Although Havell continued to work in aquatint and engraving (primarily city panoramas), he devoted most of his attention to painting the countryside of the Hudson River valley. He travelled frequently in a homemade horse-drawn trailer, sketching and taking notes and translating his sketches into larger oils. Robert Havell Jr. is considered a member of the Hudson River School of American painters. He died in 1878 and is buried in Sleepy Hollow Cemetery in New York state.

== Luke Havell's descendants ==
The following list of Luke Havell's descendants is incomplete; covering only those referenced in published sources.

- Luke Havell: drawing master and painter. Born Reading; married Charlotte Phillips 1778; died 1810 Reading.
  - William Havell: landscape painter in watercolours and oils; frequently exhibited at the Royal Academy; travelled and painted in China, India, Ceylon (now Sri Lanka), and Italy. Born 1782 Reading; died 1857 Kensington.
  - Edmund Havell: drawing master and painter; exhibited at the Royal Academy. Born 1785 Reading; married Maria Binfield; died 1864.
    - Edmund Havell junior: genre and portrait painter, and lithographer; frequently exhibited at the Royal Academy. Queen Victoria's official portraitist. Came to America and exhibited at the Centennial in Philadelphia. Born 1819 Reading; died 1899 London.
      - Alfred Charles Havell: painter of horses and figurative subjects; exhibited at the Royal Academy. Born 1855 Chelsea; married Mary Marpole Lewis 1878; died 1928.
    - Susannah Maria Havell: musician and music teacher, working with her aunt the minor composer Hannah Rampton Binfield. Born 1822 Reading.
    - Charles Richard(s) Havell: landscape painter, exhibited at the Royal Academy. Born 1828 Reading; married Charlotte Amelia Lord (granddaughter of Thomas Lord) 1855; died 1892 Caversham.
      - Ernest Binfield Havell: art writer and educator, especially in Indian art; superintendent of Government Art Schools at Madras (now Chennai) and Calcutta (now Kolkata). With Abanindranath Tagore, he established the Bengal school of art. Born 1861 Reading; died 1934 Oxford.
      - Herbert Lord Havell: classicist and writer; his posthumously published Republican Rome (1914) is still in print. Born 1863 Reading; died 1913 Oxford.
  - Charles Havell: painter and drawing master at the Reading School. Born 1792 Reading; married Thirza Cheverton 1824.
  - Henry Havell: heraldic painter; "decorator to the King" (according to Bryan). Born 1796 Reading; married Elizabeth Sims 1821; emigrated to the United States 1829.
  - George Havell: painter; travelled and painted in India. Born 1799 Reading; married Mary Ann Hale 1825; died 1839? India.
  - Frederick James Havell: steel engraver in line and mezzotint and made experiments in photography. Born 1801 Reading.
  - Charles Cedric Havell. Grandson of Charles Richard Havell. His father, Charles G Havell was a doctor at Felixstowe. His mother Cicely Ridpath was a model for Louise Jopling the artist. Charles Cedric went to Rugby School, Warwickshire and then Pembroke College, Cambridge University. While at Rugby he enthusiastically participated in the Officer Training Corps. In November 1914 he joined the Territorial Army and served as an officer in the Suffolk Regiment, achieving the rank of captain. In 1915 he was awarded the Military Cross for the brave command of a trench mortar position under extreme conditions. After the war he joined the Imperial Tobacco Company, where he eventually became a director. Charles Havell also sat on a judicial panel which heard cases concerning commercial practice.
