= Timeline of Aboriginal history of Western Australia =

Aboriginal Australians have inhabited Western Australia since about 50,000–70,000 years ago.

== 70,000 BC–1600s (prior to European contact) ==
The Aboriginal peoples of Western Australia practiced an oral tradition, with no written language, before contact with Europeans.

== 1629–1829 ==
Aboriginal life in the two centuries between 1629 and 1829 was characterized by the increased presence of Europeans along the Western Australian coastline. First contact appears to have been characterized by curiosity and trust, but with Aboriginal peoples willing to defend themselves against any unwarranted intrusion.

=== 1600s ===
- 4 June 1629 – After the ship Batavia was wrecked on uninhabited islands, two young mutineers were marooned on the mainland.
- 28 April 1656 – Wreck of the ship Vergulde Draeck (lit. 'Gilt Dragon'). 68 survivors made it to the mainland and disappeared. It has been suggested that there was a "white tribe" of Aboriginal people who survived until the 19th century.
- 5 January 1688 – William Dampier aboard the Cygnet arrives near Kimberly. He describes the Aboriginal people he meets as "the miserablest People in the World". Dampier spent time observing the people at the northern end of Cape Leveque; the encounter was hostile with casualties on both sides.
- 1699 – Return of Dampier aboard Roebuck, exploring from Broome to the Pilbara.

=== 1700s ===
- 1712 – The Zuytdorp was wrecked near Geraldton. Survivors are known to have landed, and the story of their welcome and preservation by local Aboriginal people was known as far south as Perth 122 years later. A rock carving of what appears to be a Dutch ship has been found at Walga Rock, some 300 kilometers from the coast, up the Murchison River
- April 1787 – Arthur Phillip, Governor of New South Wales, issues instructions to "endeavour by every means possible to open intercourse with the Aborigines, and to conciliate their affections, enjoining all our subjects to live in amity and kindness to them. And if our subjects shall wantonly destroy them, or give them unnecessary interruption in the exercise of their several occupations that you cause such offenders to be punished according to the degree of that offense".
- 1788 – Smallpox and measles arrive with the first fleet on the east coast of Australia and spread across the continent, possibly introduced as a form of biological warfare.
- 1791 – George Vancouver entered Albany harbor. He acknowledged the prior ownership of the land by Aboriginal Mineng people, and took possession of the land for the British crown. His act was premature, as annexation of the west would not be allowed for another thirty-five years.

=== 1801–1828 ===
- 1801 – Matthew Flinders visits Western Australia. The local Aboriginal people called the Europeans Djanga, or spirits returned from the dead land of Kurrenup (potentially Karrinyup), the land beneath the Goomber Wardarn ('sea') in the direction of the setting sun. In King George Sound, although Aboriginal people indicated they did not want Europeans visiting their campsite, amicable relations prevailed and trading occurred. Flinders gave a special parade of the soldiers under his command as thanks. A Kirrenup kening (Noongar 'corroboree') was adopted by the local people and performed by Aboriginal groups along the south coast for over a century (see Daisy Bates). The Swan River was explored by the French Captain Baudin in the Géographe, and his midshipman Heirisson gives his name to the area known to the Wadjuk Noongar as Matagadup ("place of leg deep").
- 1818 – The first of Phillip Parker King's voyages to Western Australia. Mineng Noongar, from Albany, assisted the sailors in food gathering. King also explored the Cambridge Gulf area of the Kimberley.
- 1822 – King's last voyage. He was welcomed by the Mineng Noongar.
- 1826 – Mokare, one of the Mineng Aboriginal people who later emerged as a key person in the success of early white-Aboriginal relations in Albany, was recorded in Jules Dumont d'Urville's visit of that year. Colbung, ancestor of Aboriginal activist Ken Colbung, is also recorded.
- 25 December 1826 – Major Edmund Lockyer, in the brig Amity, takes possession of King George Sound for the crown, at the orders of Governor Darling. On Michaelmas Island he was signalled by an Aboriginal man, who had been abducted and marooned by sealers. These eight sealers, led by a certain Bailey, had also killed another man and abducted women. Randall, another sealer from Tasmania, had also been abducting Aboriginal women, and was arrested by Lokyer. Aboriginal people here expressed their anger at Europeans cutting down trees, but Lokyer chose not to intervene. The Aboriginal site, Kin-gil-yilling is renamed Albany, after the Duke of Albany.
- 1827 – James Stirling, in the Success, anchored off the mouth of the Swan River. Exploring the river, he was attacked by Aboriginal people at Claise Brook. Nine years later the Aboriginal people of the area explained that the first party of whites they had seen was the marauding party of Randall. At Jane Brook, another party of Aboriginal men was found (women and children were seen hiding), who mimicked English calls of "How do you do!" and traded spears and womeras for clothing and swans shot by Stirling. Stirling explored as far as Guildford where he commented on the fine alluvial soils. He then sailed south to Albany. Lockyer was eager to return to Sydney with the Success, with Randall, as captive and to get him to stand trial for his crimes of murder and abduction. Stirling reluctantly agreed to allow Lockyer, but refused to allow the sealers and the women with them on board. They were released from custody, and later left Albany.
- 1828 – Mokkare became friends with the assistant surgeon Isaac Scott Nind, sharing a house and food in Albany. When Nind's health deteriorated, Mokkare became companion, guide, and advisor to successive commandants—Lieutenant Sleeman, Captain Wakefield, and Captain Collet Barker—living with Barker when seasonal fishing brought him to King George Sound. He became an especially good friend of Dr. Collie. Mokkare and his brother Nakina assisted troops recapturing runaway convicts, and were given steel tomahawks as a reward. By Dylan Thornley
- 10 February 1828 – British colonists from Van Diemen's Land Company kill around 30 Aboriginal men in the Cape Grim massacre.

== 1829–1881 ==
The settlement of Western Australia by Europeans, under James Stirling, in the early 1840s, created a new generation of colony-born young men who were engaged in hostilities with Aboriginal people and the imprisonment of those who dared question their authority. The settlement proceeded with the expropriation of land, the exploitation of cheap labour, and the extermination of any resistance by Aboriginal people.

=== 1829–1834 ===
- 18 June 1829 – Declaration announcing the settlement within the Territory of Western Australia, recognising the "Aboriginal inhabitants as British subjects and stated that any person behaving towards them in a 'fraudulent, cruel or felonious Manner' would be liable to prosecution and trial"
- October 1829 – Aboriginal people stole sheep, poultry and goats, and plundered a house of provisions in the Swan district. Settlers, such as Robert Menli Lyon, were deterred from taking up grants in outlying areas as a result of their fear of Aboriginal attack. He moved to and rented, William Dixon's land, which he later purchased. He mentioned that some of the soldiers, coming from Van Diemen's Land came "principally from those classes in the lower orders of society who would count it a fine sport to shoot a native as a Kangaroo".
- 1 November 1830 – Captain Frederick Irwin dispatched a corporal and four privates to the Upper Swan, where they were joined by armed settlers, who came upon a group of Aboriginal people attempting to stop their passage. The Aboriginal leader, attempting to throw a spear, was shot dead by one of the settlers. Several others were captured and brought to Perth, and subsequently released. Irwin regretted the loss of life, but hoped that the Aboriginal people would be "taught a lesson".
- 1831 – George Fletcher Moore wrote "the Aborigines were not so despicable a race as was first supposed... they are not very numerous and we are on good terms with them". Aboriginal people often shared food, and returned lost settlers to their homes. George Fletcher Moore was one of the settlers who allowed Aboriginal people to continue hunting on his lands. Others drove them off.
- 26 June 1831 – Mokare dies. The Noongar People and Europeans had assembled at Collie's house and walked to a site selected by Nakina, Mokare's brother, where the Europeans dug a grave and Mokare was interred with a buka cloak and personal artefacts to Nakina's specifications. When Collie himself was dying from tuberculosis in 1835, he asked to be buried alongside Mokare. Their graves are together beneath Albany Town Hall. Four years after Mokare's death, the surveyor John Septimus Roe had his body exhumed and re-interred at the newly established Albany Cemetery.
- 3 October 1831 – Stirling appointed Edward Barrett-Lennard commanding officer of the Yeomanry of the Middle Swan, a citizens militia, to pursue and capture Aboriginal offenders. Henry Bull was appointed commander of the Upper Swan. The orders were that, on being called out, the Yeomanry were "to cause the offending tribe to be instantly pursued, and if practicable captured and brought in at all hazard, and take such further decisive steps for bringing them to Punishment as the Circumstances of the Case may admit." From then on shepherds were armed.
- May 1832 – William Gaze, a settler on the Canning River was killed. A witness identified Yagan, son of Midgegooroo, as the killer, He was declared outlaw, and twenty pounds offered for his capture.
- 26 June 1832 – At a meeting at Guildford to discuss the "Aboriginal Question", Robert Menli Lyon reminded settlers that they had seized what was Aboriginal land and called for someone to act as mediator between the Aboriginal peoples and settlers. Four resolutions passed calling for whatever conciliatory or coercive measures were seen fit, and that if action was not taken the settlement might need to be abandoned.
- 1 August 1832 – Stirling established the Corps of Mounted Police, under the command of Captain Theophilus Ellis, with a Mr. Northcott as assistant superintendent and orders being sent to Cape Town for horses.
- September 1832 – Yagan was captured and sent to Carnac Island. He escaped six weeks later by taking a boat belonging to his captors. No attempt to recapture him was made, the six weeks' imprisonment being considered adequate penalty.
- 1833 – Based on evidence learned from Yagan at Carnac Island, R. M. Lyon described the territory of Yellagonga as Mooro, bounded by the sea, Ellen Brook, the Swan River, and Banister River (Gingin Brook or Moore River) to the north. The country of the Daren people, headed by Weeip, was the area from immediately southeast of Ellen Brook and the upper Swan River, to the Darling Scarp. The Wurerup people, were on the upper Swan River. The Beeliar were the inhabitants west of the Canning River down to Rockingham, and were led by Midgegooroo. The Beeloo were south of the Swan and east of the Canning, as far as the Darling Scarp.
- 1833–34 – In response to Aboriginal people being killed by settlers, "pay-back" killings by Aboriginal people occurred.
- 1833 – Early in the year, in an attempt to prevent starving Aboriginal people stealing food from settlers, the government established rationing stations giving flour and biscuit at Lake Monger and in the Upper Swan. Private settlers were forbidden to feed Aboriginal people, except in return for work done.
- February 1833 – the first moves were taken to prevent Aboriginal people entering the area of the City of Perth.
- April 1833 – A false rumour, of 200 Aboriginal people attacking the Preston Point Ferry, saw every man in Fremantle taking up arms to kill Aboriginals.
- 29 April 1833 – Domjum, Yagan's brother, was shot dead whilst he was breaking into a store in Fremantle with two other Aboriginal people.
- 30 April 1833 – Yagan, Midgegooroo, and Munday, in reprisal, killed two white brothers named Velnick, who had been behaving badly to Aboriginal people, on the road between Bull Creek and Canning River. Yagan had been seen by Mr. Phillips of Maddington Farm, repeatedly spearing one of the two men.
- 1 May 1833 – Captain Irwin declared the three to be outlaws. Thirty pounds was offered for Yagan, dead or alive, and twenty pounds for Munday and Midgegooroo. They were hunted for the next three months, unbeknownst to them.
- 16 May 1833 – Captain Ellis was informed that Midgegooroo's people were in the Helena Valley, and likely to cross at Drummond's Ford, near Guildford, that night. Four soldiers of the 63rd Regiment stationed themselves at the spot, but Midgegooroo failed to appear.
- 17 May 1833 – the soldiers with Mr Hardey of Peninsula Farm Maylands, and Hancock, a local bushman, found abandoned Aboriginal campsites in the Helena River, and captured Midgegooroo and his five-year-old son, after a short struggle, while he was looking after women and children whilst the other men were away hunting, He was imprisoned in Perth jail.
- 21 May 1833 – Midgegooroo was tried before Captain Irwin and the Executive Council, found guilty, and taken outside the jail, where he was immediately killed by a firing squad. Colonists present at his execution expressed their satisfaction with loud exultations. Midgegooroo's tribe expressed dissatisfaction when it was learned that he had been executed, and two parties of six soldiers each were sent to patrol the Swan and Canning rivers to protect settlers from Aboriginal people. At the same time, Constable Hunt, together with four soldiers and three colonists were sent to the Upper Swan to capture Yagan and Munday, said to be hiding amongst Weeip's people. Shortly afterwards, Yagan approached George Fletcher Moore at Millendon, and in pidgin English insisted that it was wrong for Aboriginal people to steal from settlers, and also wrong for whites to kill Aboriginal people caught stealing. When an Aboriginal person was killed by a settler, Yagan insisted that it was permissible for an Aboriginal to kill the settler, as payback in accordance with their custom. Moore insisted that if a settler was caught stealing he would be shot too, as the Aboriginal had been. If killing and theft stopped, Moore explained, there would be peace between the races. In Noongar, Yagan explained that the Europeans had come to disrupt the Aboriginal people in their lives, and who are fired upon by Europeans in their own country. He declared they would take European lives in revenge for Midgegooroo if he were killed. The next day Mr Shaw informed Yagan that Midgegooroo had been executed. Settlers in Upper Swan seemed to be defying the order to capture him, and Lieutenant Ball gave orders to his servants that Yagan was not to be shot. Friendly overtures were extended to Weeip, despite the refuge he was giving to Yagan and Munday.
- June 1833 – A meeting of the Agricultural Society discussed the growing problem with Aboriginal people and suggested specific measures rather than extermination be taken. A fortnight later, a party of the 63rd Regiment, under the command of Captain Ellis set out to hunt Yagan, being promised help by Weeip in finding him, but was unsuccessful. Weeip was taken to Perth by Mr Bull and others from the Upper Swan to meet with the lieutenant governor.
- 11 July 1833 – While on a cattle drive, two of Bull's servants, William Keats and his brother, saw a group of Aboriginal people, including Yagan, approaching Lieutenant Bull's house for flour. The Aboriginal people were generally friendly. After two failed attempts over an extended period, Keats shot Yagan in the head and was immediately speared to death by the Aboriginal people accompanying Yagan. James Keats then shot Heegan, one of the other Aboriginals, who was about to throw his spear, and aimed at Weeip, also about to throw his spear, but missed. James Keats then escaped by swimming the river and saw a group, including Weeip, spearing William repeatedly. William Cruse, after hearing of the affair, accompanied by six others, returned to the spot, found the gun had been used also as a club, and then following the sound of crying, found the wounded Heegan and the dead Yagan. Heegan was then shot through the head, to "put him out of his misery". The editor of the Perth Gazette condemned William Keats for his treachery in killing Yagan and warned settlers that there would be another round of reprisals from Aboriginal people. Two weeks later, the lieutenant governor issued a proclamation saying that Munday was no longer an outlaw as sufficient retribution had been made for the death of the Velvick brothers. James Keats claimed the reward, and Heegan's family informed others that James Keats would be killed in retribution for the death of Heegan. Lieutenant Bull encouraged James Keats to leave the colony on board the Cornwallis.
- January 1834 – for the February meeting of the Agricultural Society of Guildford, R. M. Lyon gave notice of a motion to set aside lands for the sole use of Aboriginal people in every district. He said it was incumbent on settlers who had dispossessed the Aboriginal people of their lands to do so, and that the Legislative Council effectively secure Aboriginal rights and privileges as promised, including unrestricted fishing and hunting rights on all unclaimed lands. No vote was taken and the matter was deferred until Stirling returned to the colony. Lyon was expelled from the society by members after Stirling returned.
- February 1834 – Aboriginal "theft" had increased again, and Lieutenant Governor Irwin appointed Captain Peter Pégus as an additional Superintendent of Native Tribes, with a staff of four soldiers, with duties to distribute rations and pursue Aboriginal "offenders".
- April 1834 – Calyute led a raid by thirty Binjareb on Shenton's Mill in South Perth. Shenton was locked inside and the flour was taken. Calyute, Gunmal, and Yedong were subsequently captured. Gunmal and Yedong were tied and flogged with 24 lashes at the St Georges Terrace whipping post. Calyute was transferred to Fremantle Round House, there given another 60 lashes, and released in May.
- May 1834 – Mr Locke Burgess surprised a group of Aboriginal people stealing grain from the Burgess's farm at Brook Mount. A warrant was sought for the arrest of Yeedamira, the leader of the group, who was arrested and then shot dead on trying to escape from the barracks. In retaliation, Weeip and Godaljud led a group to the barracks where, as payback, they killed Private Dennis Larkin, one of the soldiers there. A jury found Weeip, Bilyomeri, Goldaljud, Beguin, Gotark, Gregad, and Narrall all "guilty of wilful murder", insisting, contrary to British justice, that the whole group was guilty for a crime perpetrated by one. This was unpopular amongst Upper Swan settlers, who admired Weeip, and they petitioned the government claiming that Goodalyat had been the Aboriginal who had speared Larkin.
- June 1834 – Bilyomeri, Weeip's son, was captured by Captain Ellis and imprisoned in Fremantle. Captain Ellis, Captain Pegus, and Mr. Norcott were instructed to maintain constant patrols between the Swan and Canning rivers and to conduct instant floggings of any Aboriginal caught committing an offence.
- July 1834 – Calyute and twenty-one other Binjareb were involved in the revenge killing of Thomas Nesbitt, a servant of Thomas Peel. Nesbitt had been friendly with the Aboriginal people and his death sparked major concern. Mr. Parker, the Constable at Guildford, was told that a vessel had been seen wrecked six months earlier on the beach, thirty days walking to the north, and coins were found scattered on the beach.
- September 1834 – Stirling, returning from Albany, pardoned Weeip and his son, after Weeip, at the instigation of George Fletcher Moore, had travelled north looking unsuccessfully for the shipwreck and any survivors.
- 25–28 October 1834 – the so-called "Battle of Pinjarra", in which between 15 and 40 Aboriginal men, women, and children were killed, and an unknown number wounded, with one settler being wounded and another later losing his life, probably from being in a coma due to a concussion caused by falling from his horse.

=== 1835–1837 ===
- 1 January 1835 – 43 starving Aboriginal people, picking up fallen grain from an already harvested field in Maylands were shot at.
- 7 January 1835 – Aboriginal people were expelled from their Lake Monger campsite, as they were considered a threat to the nearby Leeder Farm.
- February 1835 – John McKail wakes and shoots Gogalee, the adolescent son of Yellagonga, after suspecting that Aboriginal people from a nearby camp were going through his possessions. Narrail, the son of Yagan was clubbed to death.
- March 1835 – Stirling attempts a reconciliation, realising things had gone too far. To prevent a revenge killing from Yellagonga, or from his son Nandra, who was grieving over the death of his brother, Stirling ordered the immediate arrest of McKail. Yellagonga was invited to witness McKail's trial. Stirling then acted to seal a peace treaty with the Perth Noongar, distributing fifty loaves of bread. After the celebration of a peace "kening" (= Noongar corroboree), McKail was eventually set free on a legal technicality. Francis Armstrong secured the peace by ensuring that McKail repaid Yellagonga with food and blankets. McKail was then banished from Perth, and moved to Albany, where he became a well known local settler. The case established an unfortunate precedent, as henceforth an Aboriginal person's testamony was not accepted unless supported by white testimony.
- May 1835 – James Twine, travelling to York was speared, and his companion, Murphy was killed. Resistance massacres and payback reprisal killings now moved into the Balardong lands.
- 1 June 1835 – at the first Foundation Day celebration, Aboriginal people engaged in spear throwing competitions, children ran in races for sweets, and Miago (Mogo), a Canning Aboriginal, won the race against settlers and other Aboriginal people.
- June 1835 – Mr. Trimmer, a York settler, determined to end Aboriginal pilfering from his farm, armed an illiterate labourer, Edward Gallop, who stood guard on the roof of Trimmer's barn. Gallop, that night, shot one of two thieves dead. This ushered in a new and violent turn in the York resistance. Trimmer, and Mr. Bland, a government representative, were attacked in reprisal and only escaped due to the speed of their horses. Yellagong was attacked in reprisal by Balardong, for these and other white killings of Aboriginal people in the York area, and two Aboriginal children were killed.
- October 1835 – Dr. Collie, in deteriorating heath, was given permission to return to Scotland, but his illness prevented his leaving King George Sound.
- 8 November 1835 – Dr Collie died and was buried, according to his wishes, in the same grave as his friend Mokkare, under what is now the Albany Town Hall.
- December 1835 – Captain Frederick Irwin, speaking to the Dublin Branch of the London Missionary Society, explained the need to "Christianise the Natives". This led to the establishment of the "West Australian Missionary Society".
- 1836 – Francis Armstrong, the official Interpreter of the Native Tribes, stated that it was Aboriginal tradition that the Aboriginal population of the coast migrated from the plateau and that the Aboriginal people living on the coast were descended from a few early families, at a time when Garden Island, along with Rottnest Island, was still joined to the coast, until 7,000 years ago.
- July 1836 – The West Australian Missionary Society brought Louis Giustiniani, an ex-Catholic priest, to Western Australia with his wife and two catechists (Waldecks); Giustiniani traveled to a site previously purchased by the "West Australian Missionary Society" in Middle Swan to begin his work. He was appalled at settlers competing amongst themselves in collecting the ears of Aboriginal people they had slain. The Balardong Noongar were retaliating by spearing settlers and stock, and burning homesteads. Settlers along the Avon had fenced off all of the permanent summer waterholes and were shooting at Balardong people seen inside these fences.
- July 1836 – Lieutenant Bunbury was transferred from Williams to York and became involved in killing local Aboriginal people. His diary records that in this month he "shot a few of them one night".
- August 1836 – A massed attack on the Waylen household in Toodyay, defended by four settlers and two soldiers, left four Aboriginal men dead. Bunbury tracked one wounded Aboriginal man into the bush and shot him through the head. Bunbury also recorded the names of another 11 Aboriginal men he killed on another occasion.
- September 1836 – Bland, another York settler, shot and killed another Aboriginal "trespasser".
- 1836 – Gear, a popular Aboriginal person, brought to the courthouse and accused of stealing wheat, is sentenced to 40 lashes. Giustiniani, horrified, offers to defend all future Aboriginal people brought to court free of charge. This makes him very unpopular with settlers. Armstrong records the removal of the Waugal eggs from the Goonininup sacred site at Mount Eliza. The subsequent loss of an anchor at the site led to attempts to get local Aboriginal people to dive and retrieve it. Wadjuk people refuse, but a Yed man from Moore diver attempts it; he drowns and his body is not recovered, justifying to the local people that the site is winaitj (sacred).
- December 1836 – The brother of the man shot by Bland, took revenge upon Knott, an old man living alone some 5 kilometres from York, Western Australia. Revenge shootings and other reprisals continued.
- 1837 – The British House of Commons committee on the rights of Aboriginal people before the law debated: "Should district magistrates be allowed to issue summary punishments?" as was happening in Western Australia. "Should Aboriginal people have the power to appear in court? Could they be represented by Counsel? Have the rights to an interpreter?" The Buxton Select Committee on Native Peoples ruled that within the recollections of many living men: "...every part of this territory was the undisputed property of the Aboriginal people." However, in the establishment of the colonies it did not appear that the "territorial rights of the natives were considered" and in fact their claims "...whether as sovereigns or as proprietors of the soil, have been utterly disregarded. The land has been taken from them without the assertion of any title other than that of superior force." This was ruled as contrary to British common law, and the report acknowledged that it must be an oversight. It stated that the effects of this dispossession would continue to be enormous for the settlers of the colony until the injustice would be corrected.

Francis Armstrong visited the eight Wadjuk campsites around Perth and estimated that only 295 people out of the 1500 there had lived there at the time of the arrival of the first settlers seven years before. The smallest groups were those in greatest proximity to the white settlements. This would seem to indicate that contact with the Djanga (Spirits of the dead = the name given to the settlers) was proving fatal to Aboriginal groups, through killings and reprisals, starvation, or disease; and that there may have also been elevated intra-Aboriginal payback killings from increasing accusations of sorcery – (a result of the increase, inexplicable to Aboriginal people, of the rise of fatal diseases). Neville Green also believed there may have been a deliberate wish to avoid contact, amongst people who still had a viable culture.

Stirling warned the York settlers to have no dealings with Aboriginal people, trying to "impress on every European the necessity there is by keeping arms in [working] order". As a result, Heal, a local "settler" set his dogs against a group of women trying to access what had been their local waterhole. The women were obliged to seek safety in a deep pool. A reprisal spearing of Heal, whilst he was working with his partner, one Mr. Burns, was prevented from being fatal by Mrs. Burns threatening the attackers with a gun. Despite the offer of a reward, the "aggressors" were never captured. A corroboree and an offer of restitution by the two men, brought the matter to a satisfactory conclusion. The new government resident in York only made matters worse, when he arrested the two men supposedly involved and sent them to Perth for trial. One died along the way as a result of the brutality of his treatment in white hands, initiating a new round of violence. Peter Chidlow and Edward Jones were speared by Balardong Noongar, who believed that he had been deliberately tricked into taking lime instead of flour. Woods, a York settler, left a poisoned hamper for Aboriginal people, and other gifts of poisoned flour were the cause of another round of reprisals.

- May 1837 – Giustiniani protested against George Moore sentencing an Aboriginal to seven years for stealing one bunch of grapes, growing on what had, until 1829, been the Aboriginal's land.
- June 1837 – Yellagonga's wife was arrested on a trifling charge and forced to sleep on a cold stone floor without a blanked or any other heating. She was released without trial in a very sick condition. George Fletcher Moore is taunted by Giustianini for finding Goordap guilty of killing a sheep. Goordap was sentenced to seven years transportation to Rottnest, "beyond the seas". Gear, another Wadjuk Noongar, is imprisoned for a month and given 48 lashes for stealing a handful of flour.
- July 1837 – James Minchin and five other settlers were killed in the Henley Brook area of the middle Swan river by local Aboriginal people.
- October 1837 – Giustianini becomes the first white person to defend any Aboriginal person tried in a court of law. Durgap was sentenced for stealing a handful of dough, and sent for seven years "beyond the seas", Neu-anung denied involvement in the theft, but admitted to eating some of the flour. He was sentenced to six months hard labour. Googot, a third prisoner, was sentenced to seven years transportation for stealing 10 lb (5 kg) of fresh butter. As a result of his efforts to help defend these Aboriginal people, Giustianini was ridiculed in the local media.

Moore then travelled throughout the York District, with Garbung, the son of one of the Aboriginal people defended by Giustianini, hoping to mediate a peace to the almost continuous killings that had been occurring over the previous two years.

=== 1838–1839 ===
- January 1838 – George Grey's party set out from Hanover Bay, following the Glenelg River. During the expedition they encountered a group of Aboriginals. Grey was speared, the wound resulting in an abscess; and the party returned to Hanover Bay, where they packed up the base camp and sailed to Mauritius.
- 13 February 1838 – Giustianini, shocked and dismayed at the treatment of Aboriginal people by the settlers, left Western Australia. The failure of the governor to punish settlers guilty of massacre in the York district resulted in the Balardong Noongar in the area being decimated.
- May 1838 – Aboriginal groups did not leave the coast as normal but gathered at Fremantle to feast off the carcasses left by 13 whalers.

The Mount Eliza Aboriginal Feeding Station, the sacred site of Goonininup, was closed, and the site purchased for a steam mill. (The Swan Brewery later acquired the site as it had sufficient fresh water to aid in the brewing of beer).

- July 1838 – The popular and charismatic Molly Dobbin was found guilty of breaking into a house and was sentenced to transportation for 7 years. With nine other Aboriginal prisoners, he was taken to Rottnest under the supervision of Corporal Welch and three privates of the 21st regiment. They escaped by burning down the tree to which they had been chained at night, and took Mr. Thompson's boat to the mainland, where one was drowned as the boat capsized in the surf. The prisoners were recaptured and returned with extended sentences.

With the closure of the Mount Eliza Feeding Station, Francis Armstrong was given a town house in St Georges Terrace, and his neighbours complained of the Aboriginal people who were coming to see him. A petition was started which claimed for the first time that the "proximity of Aborigines would lower the value of the land". This culminated in new legislation to ban Aboriginal people from the Perth settlement.

- August 1838 – Lieutenant George Grey, whilst exploring the Yanchep region, was taken to be the returned Djanga of the son of a woman called Nginyeran. The Aboriginal people kept up a constant wailing outside Grey's house: "She must see her son, she must see her son". Grey agreed to an enormous kening (corroboree) held in his honour at Yanchep. At the corroboree the group parted to allow the woman and her family to approach Grey. Hugging him around the neck she cried Boondoo, boondoo. Nanga koolong (True, true. My boy).
- September 1838 – Corporal Welch was replaced by Henry Vincent, as Superintendent of Aboriginal Prisoners.

The London-based Aboriginal Protection Society set up an Australian sub-committee that ruled that Britain had oppressed the Aboriginal peoples by taking their land "without treaties or consent founded on sufficient compensation".

- 1 January 1839 – Following a House of Commons enquiry into the treatment of Aboriginal people by settlers, Governor Hutt was appointed as second governor of Western Australia. Like Gipps in Queensland and George Grey in South Australia, as part of the concern of the British Crown into the poor treatment of Aboriginal people, he was ordered to find ways of encouraging the civilising and Christianising of the Aboriginal people. On arrival, Hutt immediately set up a department for the control of Aboriginal affairs, to deal with the dispossessed Aboriginal people and bring them rapidly into civilisation and Christianity. It consisted of two commissioners, whose salaries were appointed and paid for from England, two protectors, a translator, two mounted inspectors and 18 mounted Aboriginal trackers, a jailer, and a military guard at Rottnest. Francis Armstrong was appointed the first commissioner.
- 1 April 1839 – George Grey's fourth expedition to explore between Shark Bay and Fremantle was wrecked at the mouth of the Murchison River. The disaster was saved by Kaiber, a Binjareb man who had befriended Grey on his third expedition searching for a lost settler between Williams and Bunbury. Kaiber negotiated with local Yamatji tribes for safe passage and sustenance for the shipwrecked crew. Grey was impressed by Kaiber's obvious intelligence. 320 kilometres north of Perth the party divided with Grey and Kaiber going ahead to secure aid. The governor dispatched Weeip and Warrup to find the missing explorers who were located 100 km further north.
- 1839 – Smallpox vaccine was brought to Western Australia, but for the next 15 years it was used only for the white settlers, despite smallpox's virulent effects on Aboriginal populations.

=== 1840s ===
- January 1840 – Edward John Eyre set out with George Baxter; two New South Wales Aboriginals, Joey and Yarry, and Wylie; and a young Mineng Noongar from Albany to cross from Fowlers' Bay to Albany.
- 29 April 1840 – Baxter was killed by Joey and Yarry, and the supplies for the expedition were stolen. Wylie and Eyre pushed on, with their rations reduced to spoonful of sugar and a strip of dried horse-meat.
- June 1840 – The arrival of a Methodist pastor, Reverend John Smithies, on a mission to the Aboriginal people at Fremantle. He was met and welcomed by Francis Armstrong, in Armstrong's new capacity as Protector of Aborigines.
- 9 July 1840 – Eyre and Wylie arrive in Albany, and Wylie is met with joy following his safe return, as he had been thought dead. Eyre gave him a shotgun and the York Agricultural Society presented him with a badge and a gift of money.
- September 1840 – Reverend Smithies opens an Aboriginal subscription-based chapel in William street. Francis Armstrong (called Branji by the Noongar), and his wife May, were appointed as teachers, and started with a class of thirty boys and girls. This was the first and last secular attempt to educate children first in their vernacular language, until the 1970s. Unfortunately Armstrong and his wife removed the children from their parents, the first precedent for what was to become known as the Stolen Generations. At the end of their schooling, the pupils were sent to work as servants to selected white families in return for basic subsistence.
- 1840 – Joseph Stokes married a teenage graduate of the Perth Native School, the first recorded marriage between a European and a Noongar. Mrs. Stokes taught her illiterate husband how to read and write. In London, the Aboriginal Protection Society published an Outline for a System for Legislation Securing the Protection of All Inhabitants of All Countries Colonised by Great Britain which "urged that it be a fundamental principle of colonisation that no settlement be made on any land possessed or claimed by its inhabitants, without consent, formally obtained by treaty or otherwise substantially acknowledged by them". Today, Aboriginal people are still awaiting such a treaty, and only 151 years later were their land rights legally acknowledged.
- August 1841 – The Aboriginal people who had remained at Goonininup (the Swan Brewery site) since the closure of the Aboriginal Feeding Station there, were moved to an Anglican-run campsite at Jane Brook (the "West Australian Missionary Society" mission site) where the Reverend Giustianini's mission school was reopened under Abraham Jones. Subsequently, an Anglican Aboriginal school on similar lines was opened in Fremantle by Reverend George King. An influenza outbreak that year killed 11 of the Jones's school's 23 students, making parents very reluctant to have their children educated there. At this camp were the first recorded Aboriginal cases of venereal disease and tuberculosis, as well as influenza. Those diseases were subsequently to sweep through Aboriginal populations in the state.
- 1840 – Governor Hutt announced a land bounty, as a remission of a land purchase price, for those white settlers who consent to train Aboriginal people. The Governor also created the position of Aboriginal Police Aides; and Maigo, Molly Dobbin, and Munday from Perth, Mundigo and Mando from the Canning, Tonquin and Winat from the Upper Swan, Denmar and Mornang from the Murray Binjareb, and Bunni from the Busselton Wardandi were all appointed, although Maigo was later dismissed for beating his wife. Also, an act was passed that established Rottnest as a prison, although the governor stated that it was to be a training establishment to domesticate and prepare Aboriginal people for employment. Stirling's "rations" for Aboriginal people displaced by settlement, were reduced to 500 grams of flour per month, only given in return for good behaviour. Eventually it was cut out altogether, forcing Aboriginal people to seek labouring jobs from the people who had seized their land.
- 1842 – Crown versus Wewar tries the first Aboriginal for a tribal killing. After being found guilty, Wewar was transported to Rottnest. Henry Trigg accompanied him to the island to build the Rottnest lighthouse, and learned that Wewar was perplexed at the governor's displeasure. He stated that Aboriginal people never interfered with white ways of murders, why should whites interfere with what was a traditional Aboriginal matter. This precedent was to have a disastrous effect upon Noongar and other Aboriginal groups' marriage customs, as Aboriginals who made winnaitj or mundju illegal liaisons, and would have been punished by losing their lives, now could have incestuous liaisons formerly outlawed by kinship principles, with impunity. Those enforcing the punishments were now not allowed to, and were themselves punished by, European courts, and could be tried and hanged. Winnaitj marriages proliferated, as traditional law was flouted. Henry Trigg reported seeing Aboriginal prisoners at Rottnest weeping at the sight of cooking-fire smoke from relatives cooking on the mainland. In York, Barrow resigned as Protector of the Aboriginal people to be replaced by R. H. Bland, who took a very punitive attitude to the local Balardong.
- 10 June 1843 – Death of Yellagonga, by drowning.
- 1843 – Father John Brady visited Western Australia and writes to Rome appealing for missionaries to be sent to the Indigenous peoples of Western Australia. Charles Symmonds, Protector of Aborigines, has the two Aboriginal people, Eanna and Bokoberry, arrested and confined to Rottnest to "teach them, outwardly at least, to conform to our social regulations". Those who had acquired farming skills in Rottnest gardens, and assisted in harvesting salt, were given early pardon and allowed to return home. Wollaston noted that large numbers of Aboriginal people in the south west were dying from epidemics.
- 1844 – The Aboriginal school was shifted to Wanneroo. George Shenton, as Governor of the School, reported that it is hard work trying to destroy the natural habits of Aboriginal bush life. Cultural genocide was the educational policy and was now firmly established.
- 1846 – George Grey left Western Australia. Writing of his experiences in the state, he said that despite those who treat Aboriginal people as inferior, that the Aboriginals were "as apt and intelligent as any race of men that I am acquainted with". His experience with Indigenous people was to deepen throughout his life until as Governor of New Zealand he insisted in the New Zealand Constitution that seats be reserved for Maoris in the new Parliament.
- 1847 – 8,000 kangaroo skins were exported from Albany.

=== 1851–1879 ===
- 1851 – Few Balardong in the York district were left, and they were ravaged by starvation, venereal disease, and influenza.
- 1852 – Systematic raiding by Aboriginal people of cattle in the Geraldton area continued into 1853. From 1829, some 30 European settlers in Western Australia had been killed by this time and another 34 had been wounded. No record was kept of Aboriginal casualties but a ratio of 10–20 times the settlers' death toll is suggested.
- 16 October 1875 The Battle of Ularring between Ernest Giles and a large organiseed group of Aboriginal people. No Europeans were listed as injured, and the considerable Aboriginal casualties were not recorded.
- 1877 – Just before her death, Mary Ellen Cuper (born Ellen Pangieran), who was an expert Morse Code operator, trained another Aboriginal woman, Sarah Ninak, to take her place. Governor Ord issued a proclamation forbidding the practice of chaining Aboriginals together with neck chains, but it continued unabated.
- 1879 – Alexander Forrest explored from the De Grey River north to Beagle Bay, and then along the Fitzroy River to the Victoria River in the Northern Territory. It seems that the method of capturing local Aboriginal people to torture them into telling where water holes were had become a common practice, which explained why Forrest reported that the Aboriginal people appeared excessively frightened of the whites. At Beagle Bay, however, he was surprised by the friendliness of the Indigenous people there, many of whom spoke broken English.

== 1881–1899 ==
The sixty years from 1881 to the 1940s can be neatly divided into two by the passage of the 1905 Aboriginal Act, which established institutionalised racism and created what amounted to Aboriginal "concentration camps" in which the Aboriginal people were to be confined until the race became extinct. It began with the Fairburn Report which first drew attention to the "Aboriginal Problem". This institutionalised racism—like the racism of the Nazi period in Germany, that of the southern states of the US, and that of South Africa—reached its peak in the 1930s. The "final solution to the Aboriginal problem" was to take all children from Aboriginal parents, who were considered as "biologically capable of having children, but not socially capable of raising them." This "solution" continued beyond this period until well into the 1970s. The major task confronting Aboriginal people throughout this period was how their cultures could survive.

- 1881 – C. D. V. Foss (died 1929) was appointed magistrate; and, with a company of military police and three Aboriginal trackers, he travelled across the Gascoyne, investigating complaints and imposing sentences that were later shown to be illegal and excessive. Pastoralists had made Aboriginal people de facto slaves on their own land, in contravention of British law. By marking a cross on a "contract", Aboriginal people were forced to work as shepherds, shearers, shed hands, domestic servants, or concubines. Once "assigned" the men and women were considered the "property" of the station, and could be arrested and sent back by the police if they "absconded". Consistent absconders had their feet burned or were branded with their master's initial. The Fairburn Report, which reported on these abuses was howled down by angry pastoralists in Parliament. Aboriginal labour in the state was numbered as 1,640 men and 706 women, nearly 7% of the total white population of the time, estimated at 30,013 people.
- June 1881 – The first judicial court was held on Brockman's station. Four Aboriginal men were tried and sentenced to be transported to Rottnest Island. Aboriginal resistance in the north grew in intensity. Gascoyne, Lyons, and the Upper Minilya tribes were said to be the worst in the state. Charles Gayle asked that the government shut its eyes for six months and he would put an end to the depredations by exterminating the troublemakers.
- 1882 – Flogging of Aboriginal prisoners on Rottnest was legalised, although it had already been abolished for Europeans. John Forrest spoke in favour of the punishment. Only the cat-of-nine-tails was nominally prohibited; but its use continued, being used at the Moore River settlement at least until 1940. It was admitted in the Legislative Council that the great majority of sentences of Aboriginal people to Rottnest had been illegal. Governor Ord intervened and a large number of Aboriginal people were released from custody. Alexander Crawfords, running a sheep station in the Murchison, and writing to his fiancée, Lillie Matthews in Victoria, wrote of the continuous way in which Europeans "in arms" were engaged in "nigger hunts". Lillie was horrified at the brutality he so casually described. The Gold Rushes brought still more unattached men to Western Australia, many contracting both legal and de facto marriages with Aboriginal women. Typical was Anderson, a Fin, who married Lucy Bobbinet, and having three children with her before abandoning her in 1899.
- 1883 – The Attorney General, Hensman, introduced a bill in parliament to extend the powers of magistrates in the north, and to legalise all questionable sentences to Rottnest Island that had occurred. The Colonial Secretary, Malcolm Fraser, said at the second reading, that the bill was intended to "affirm the convictions made by Mr. Foss at the Gascoyne". A Commission of Inquiry into the treatment of Aboriginal prisoners on Rottnest confirmed that the identifying disks on prisoners were sometimes exchanged, resulting in the alteration of sentences, and the release of prisoners often into alien territory from which they were then forbidden to leave. Over 179 Rottnest island prisoners, mostly from the north, were in conditions so overcrowded that more than 60 died from a bout of influenza. The second great measles epidemic entered the state via Albany, spreading to Bunbury, York, Fremantle, Perth, Geraldton, and Carnarvon. Ten died at New Norcia as a result, and, with a combined influenza outbreak, it killed 64 prisoners at Rottnest. In this year, Victoria River station, in the Kimberley, was stocked for the first time.
- 1884 – Alexander Forrest published his report on the Kimberley expedition, estimating that some 10,000,000 acres (40,000 km^{2}) are available for grazing sheep and cattle. Just before Forrest left Darwin, the Commissioner of Crown Lands had been presented with 26 applications to take up the most promising lands in the Kimberley. Adam Johns and Phil Saunders, following Forrest's route, discovered gold at Halls Creek. David Carly wrote to England saying, "the whole system of Horrors as is done to the Natives" would continue until the "Home Government send someone here who has got a mind that will not be ruled by a few Settlers whose Heart is set on getting Gold by any means". In Bridgetown, a third Aboriginal reserve of 100 acres (0.40 km^{2}) was established.
- 1885 – The Duracks settle Lissadell Station in the Kimberley. E. T. Hardman (died 1887), the government geologist, confirms the find of Halls Creek gold. Fifteen men at the field clash with local Aboriginal people, but resistance to miners declined as the number of miners increased. An amendment to the Dog Act stated that Aboriginal people in the state are only allowed one dog and then only if it is licensed. Most Aboriginal people in the state could not afford the licence, and so police could shoot any Aboriginal hunting dog any time they wished.
- January 1885 – Henry Parry, the Anglican archbishop lodged for new "mission reserves" to be established for the Vasse, Murchison, Ashburton, and Gascoyne. He welcomed the Reverend J. B. Gribble and sent him to work amongst the Aboriginal peoples in the Gascoyne. Gribble arrived in Perth and was introduced to the governor, Sir Napier Broome. He was given letters of introduction to Maitland Brown and Alexander Forrest. On arriving in Carnarvon, Gribble was welcomed by Foss, the magistrate; however, at the time he witnessed six Aboriginal men and one Aboriginal woman chained by the neck to a tree, awaiting the magistrate's visit, still some weeks away. Thirty-seven men had been chained inside a tin shed in the summer heat. Moving to the Kimberley, Gribble discovered that police raiding parties, along the Fitzroy, were organised to keep the pearling industry supplied with "blackbirded" Aboriginal people to work on the luggers, in contravention of the earlier Pearl Shell Fisheries Act. Many pastoralists and jackeroos had taken Aboriginal concubines, but any girl who tried to run away was rounded up and escorted by police back to her "master". Finding no support amongst locals to end these practices, Gribble travelled back to Perth to publicise what he had found. The uproar was huge. Rather than alienate those pastoralists who were contributing to the building of St George's Cathedral, Bishop Parry decided to sacrifice Gribble to the indignation of the pastoralists.
- December 1885 – A meeting of pastoralists in Carnarvon appointed Brockman, Maitland Brown, and others to condemn Gribble's missionary work. There was still no attempt to properly establish guilt of Aboriginal people "sentenced" to Rottnest from the north. For instance, on 28 December Aboriginal men were found a quarter of a mile away from speared cattle and were found guilty of an offence without any evidence being presented, and were sentenced to two years on Rottnest.
- January 1886 – A petition was circulated to have Gribble removed. Gribble travelled then to Victoria, trying to gain support against the pastoralists of the Gascoyne, and entertained people in packed halls with the stories of the atrocities that he had witnessed. So grim were the reports that women and children were refused admittance. In his talks he exposed the widespread practice of "child labour" and condemned the "assignment system" as slavery. He protested the abuses of the court system in Carnarvon, where it was admitted that convictions against Aboriginals were secured by a single uncorroborated word of any settler, with the person being transported to Rottnest, often to die. Gribble reported that he had been shot at in the bush and nearly lynched when sailing to Perth. When he was met by "Christian communicants" in Fremantle, he was told that Aboriginal people should be treated "only as horses or dogs". Winthrop Hackett, then editor of The West Australian called Gribble "a lying, canting humbug", and Gribble sued him for libel. At the height of the controversy, Governor Broome classified as confidential a series of reports from the Government Resident of Roebourne, Lieutenant Colonel E. F. Angelo, that documented the slavery and murder perpetrated by local pearlers, settlers, and the local magistrate, who was offering to kidnap Aboriginal people for the pearlers at a cost of five pounds a head, or to shoot them for 2s 6p each. "The fears of the whites", he wrote, was "more a cause of disorder than the aggression of the blacks." About 600–700 Aboriginal people were then used in diving off the pearling luggers. Had these reports been made available, Gribble would have won his case against Hackett; but he lost, and, in disgrace, Gribble left the state and published "Dark Deeds in a Sunny Land" a fierce castigation of his opponents that created such a furore that the welfare of the Aboriginals was obscured by much blackening of reputations until the 1905 Aboriginal Act.
- 1886 – Following the furore over the Fairburn Report and the work of Gribble, parliament introduced the Aborigines Protection Act 1886 which established the Aboriginal Protection Board with five members and a secretary, all of whom were nominated by the governor. Protectors of Aborigines were appointed by the board under the conditions laid down in the Act. In theory, Protectors of Aborigines were empowered to undertake legal proceedings on behalf of Aboriginal people. As the board had very limited funds, Protectors received very limited remuneration; and so a range of people were appointed as local Protectors, including Resident Magistrates, Jail Wardens, Justices of the Peace and in some cases ministers of religion, though most were local police inspectors. The minutes of the board show that they mostly dealt with matters of requests from religious bodies for financial relief and reports from resident or police magistrates pertaining to trials and convictions of Aboriginal people under their jurisdiction. The board did introduce employment contracts between employers and Aboriginal workers over the age of 14, although there was no provision under the Act for contracts to include wages. Employees were to be provided with "substantial, good and sufficient rations", clothing, and blankets. The 1886 Act provided a Resident Magistrate with the power to indenture "half-caste" and Aboriginal children, from a suitable age until they turned 21. An Aboriginal Protection Board was also established to prevent the abuses reported earlier, but rather than protect Aboriginal people, it mainly succeeded in putting them under tighter government control. The Board was intended to enforce contracts, employment of prisoners, and apprenticeships, but there was not sufficient power to enforce clauses in the north, clauses that were openly flouted. The Act defined as "Aboriginal" "every Aboriginal native of Australia, every Aboriginal half-caste, or child of a half-caste". Governor Broome insisted that the act contained within it a clause permitting traditional owners to continue hunting on their tribal lands. The effect of the Act was to give increasing power to the Board over Aboriginal people, rather than setting up a system to punish Europeans for wrongdoing against Aboriginal people. An Aboriginal Department was set up, under the office of the Chief Protector of Aborigines. Nearly half of the Legislative Council voted to amend the act to allow contract labour from Aboriginals as young as 10 but it was defeated. Mackenzie Grant, the member for the north, claimed that child labour from those as young as 6 or 7 was a necessary commonplace, as "in this way they gradually become domesticated". Attorney General Septimus Burt, in debate on the 2nd reading, claimed that contracts were being issued not for current work, but to hold Aboriginal people as slaves on stations for potential future work, and so prevent them from being free to leave.
- 1893 – The 1893 Education Act of Western Australia gave white parents the power to object to any Aboriginal child attending any school also attended by their children, a provision which saw Aboriginal children progressively and completely excluded from the state education system.
- 1896 – John Forrest, premier of Western Australia, violated the Western Australia Constitution Act 1890, which granted self government to Western Australia, by taking control of Aboriginal affairs from the British House of Commons, and sliced funding below the 1% of government funds earmarked for Aboriginal affairs in the Constitution.
- 1897 – As part of the Western Australian government's attempt to gain control of Aboriginal affairs, which had been under the Constitution of Western Australia vested in reserve under the Colonial Office, the Aborigines Department was set up as a result of the 1897 Aborigines Act, which abolished the Aborigines Protection Board. The department operated as a sub-department of the Treasury, with a very small staff under the Chief Protector of Aborigines. Repeated cuts in the operating budget of the Aborigines Department, partly resulting from the 1905 Aborigines Act, saw this department merged in 1909 to form the Department of Aborigines and Fisheries.
- 1899 – A report to the Protector of Aborigines showed that there were 67 children at Beagle Bay mission who were "nourished and instructed" and "have created a want of civilised food" and other practices that helped them, in the belief of the missionaries, give up the "savage" way of life.

== 1900–1942 ==
- 1901 – The Pallottines, a Catholic society, became involved in running the Beagle Bay Mission as part of the Catholic Diocese of Broome. and from 1972 the head of the departments for child welfare was the guardian of any children deemed to be "native wards" or "wards of the State". In 1976, Beagle Bay became a self-governing community.
- 1904 – The Royal Commission on the Administration of Aborigines and the Condition of the Natives, chaired by Dr. Walter Edmund Roth, Chief Protector of Aborigines in Queensland, discussed the growing "half-caste problem". Most Aboriginal people were living in regional areas, where sexual exploitation of Aboriginal women by Europeans led to an increasing number of "degenerate" mixed-race children who were subsequently abandoned by their fathers. It led in 1905 to a new Act which extended the definition of "Aboriginal" to all half-caste children and made all Aboriginal persons as wards of the state with the Chief Protector of Aborigines as legal guardian in place of the parents, with powers to remove children from their parents' care and place them in custodial situations.

The Honourable J. M. Drew stated

I think it is our duty not to allow these children, whose blood is half-British, to grow up as vagrants and outcasts, as their mothers are now. There is a large number of absolutely worthless black and half-castes about who grow up to lives of prostitution and idleness; they are a perfect nuisance; if they were taken away from their surroundings of temptation much good might be done with them. There is no power to do this now, consequently a half – caste who possesses few of the virtues and nearly all the vices of whites, grows up to be a mischievous and very immoral subject. This Bill will tend, in a great measure, to remedy this abuse. I may say it may appear to be a cruel thing to tear away an Aborigine child from its mother, but it is necessary in some cases to be cruel to be kind.

- April 1906 – Henry Prinsep confirmed as Protector of Aborigines.
- April 1906 – George Canning set out from Perth to locate well sites roughly a day's walk apart and with enough water for up to 800 head of cattle. Canning's party had twenty-three camels, two ponies, eight pairs of water drums with a capacity of 320 gallons ... and sufficient food supplies to last nine months, with the exception of tinned meats, a sufficient supply of which it is almost impossible to carry, owing to its bulk and weight. Consequently, they depended to a certain extent on what game they could get. They were issued police neck chains to capture and hold Aborigines, to lead the party to water. An unknown number of Aboriginal men and women were massacred en route.
- 1908 – Bernier and Dorre islands were used for the isolation and treatment of Aboriginal people from north Western Australia believed to be suffering from venereal disease. Lock hospitals were established, with female patients residing in an existing house on Bernier Island, and accommodation for males being built near White Beach on Dorre Island. The patients and their families often had little idea of where or why they were taken. Patients were kept on the islands until they were cured or died. Those who were fit enough hunted game, fished, and worked to establish and maintain the hospitals. Remnants of the hospital buildings and artefacts from this era still remain on the islands.
- 1 January 1909 – Creation of the Department of Aborigines and Fisheries. Aboriginal people were considered as part of the protected flora and fauna of Western Australia.
- 1910 – Daisy Bates visited Bernier and Dorre islands and describes the hospitals as "tombs of the living dead."
- 1911 – The Aborigines Act Amendment Act significantly extended the Protector's guardianship power to remove Aboriginal children to the "exclusion of the rights of the mother of an illegitimate or half caste child". In that year, 200 Aboriginal people had camped on the fringes of Katanning, in order to allow their children to get an education; but under the powers of the 1893 Education Act, white parents in 1914 demanded that Aboriginal children be excluded from their school, and in 1915 the Katanning white community, acting on its own, had local police remove the Aboriginal fringe dwellers to what was the equivalent of a concentration camp at Carrolup.
- 1913 – Admissions decrease on Bernier and Dorre Island due to increased costs.
- 1915 – The appointment of A. O. Neville as Protector of Aborigines saw a change in policy. He saw the Aboriginal population of Western Australia as comprising two groups:

- "Full-blood Aborigines", who were to be segregated from the community in order that they would become extinct.
- "Half-caste Aborigines", who were to be assimilated through intermarriage within the white community as quickly as possible.

- 1918 – Bernier and Dorre Islands were abandoned, the hospitals closed, and the patients and buildings relocated to Port Hedland. Hospital records were poorly kept. So, exact figures cannot be ascertained, but more than 700 patients were admitted, of whom close to 200 died on the islands.
- 1922 – In the interests of economy and expediency, the Carrolup River Native Settlement was closed and inmates transferred to Moore River Native Settlement near Moora, with the Carrolup land being taken over by local farmers.
- 18 May 1926 – At Durragee Hill, on the Nulla Nulla property, 300 Aboriginal people holding a ceremony were "dispersed" by shotgun fire from a patrol. Many were recorded as injured, and the number of deaths was unknown.
- June 1926 – The Forrest River massacre took place at Oombulgarri. Despite the arrest of the perpetrators, the case never went to trial. Although numbers were disputed, it was claimed that 16 Aborigines were killed; and twenty bodies were burned.
- 1927 – A. O. Neville, under the provisions of the 1905 Act, makes a five-square-kilometre area of central Perth a prohibited area, in order to discourage Noongars from loitering and gathering in large numbers. Noongars who worked in the city and within the prohibited area were required to carry identification and a pass. As there was also a night curfew, Noongars had to have permits to travel after 6pm. The prohibitions stayed in place until 1953.
- 1934 – The Moseley Royal Commission heard evidence that the Moore River Native Settlement was a "woeful spectacle", with buildings over-crowded (by at least 50%), buildings and clothing vermin ridden, no vocational training except for the chores given by staff, the diet lacking all fresh fruit, vegetables, eggs, milk, and the health of inmates being seriously affected. Solitary confinement of children in the "Boob" was stated to be barbarous and must be stopped. The Commission ruled that the Settlement had "no hope of success" with the children in its care.
- 1936 – A Commissioner for Native Affairs replaced the Protector of Aborigines, but the Commissioner continued the legal authority granted by the Aborigines Act 1905.
- 16 July 1937 – Birth of Vivienne Sahanna, née Corbett, at the Moore River Native Settlement.

Nevertheless, Neville continued in his role as Chief Protector to argue before the Moseley Royal Commission of 1934 for an extension of his powers; and, despite some opposition to this, the commission agreed to support his recommendation. In 1936, under sections 8 and 12 of the new Native Administration Act, the Chief Protector's guardianship powers were increased still further by a new definition of "native child" to mean any child with any Aboriginal descent. The Act further widened the scope of the Chief Protector's guardianship and increased his jurisdiction over all Aboriginal people in Western Australia.

- 1940s–1970s – Roelands Mission at Roelands, outside of Bunbury, ran as a centre for up to 500 children of Aboriginal descent removed from their parents under the policies now called Stolen Generations. Amongst those involved were Sidney Jackson (ex-VFL/AFL Carlton player), Phil Prosser (ex-Army Duntroon graduate), and Doris Pilkington (author of Follow the Rabbit-Proof Fence).
- 1941 – Thirty De Grey Aboriginal Station men successfully struck over poor food. Quality of food was improved as a result.
- 1942 – Secret meeting of Aboriginal people at Skull Springs in the Pilbara, attended by groups from all over the Pilbara, concerned by threats to their traditional life. The elders invited activist Don McLeod to the meeting. Strike action was urged, followed by six weeks of further negotiations, before agreement was reached. Dooley Bin Bin, a 44-year-old Nyandamada tribesman, and 36-year-old Clancy McKenna, together with McLeod, secretly met with Aboriginal communities throughout the Pilbara. Strike action was deferred until after the war so as not to be unpatriotic.

== 1943 to the Mabo case of 1992 ==
This period began with the Great Stockman's Strike of 1946. It, like the other periods, can be divided into two by the events of 1967, after which Aboriginal people were recognised as Australian, and by the passage of the Racial Discrimination Act 1975, which for the first time since 1829 recognised Aboriginal people as equal under Australian law. The passing of the Mabo and Wik High Court decisions, which recognised Aboriginal people as in possession of the land at the date of European settlement, is an appendix to these changes. This period is still not complete, as the Western Australian Labor and Liberal Coalition governments are still resisting the native title claim of the Noongar people.

- 5 May 1946 – After having been leaked to the white community, who basically dismissed the idea as impossible, the Stockman's Strike broke out on 20 of the 22 Pilbara stations. The strikers demanded 30 shillings weekly plus better board and keep. Local owners and the Perth press were enraged, blaming communist agitators, unbelieving that Aboriginal people were capable of planning this themselves. Strikers supported themselves by living off the land, running cattle, and mining for minerals. Reclaiming land and making culture strong was to follow. Dooley Bin Bin was arrested at Marble Bar whilst workers were mining tin with their wooden "yandi" bowls. Led away to Port Hedland in neck chains and charged with inciting Aboriginal people against whites, he called "It was in yandi that our mothers carried us. Now the yandi carries us again - keep working." Clancy McKenna and Don McLeod were arrested; McLeod's bail was set at over $600, higher than a year's salary
- 1947 - The Coolbaroo League, founded by the young activist, Helena Clarke from Port Hedland, Yamatji brothers Jack and Bill Poland, and their Wadjela friend, Geoff Harcus, aimed to lobby to allow Aboriginal people to legally begin living in Perth once again. Taking its name from the Yamatji word for Magpie, it was a hope for reconciliation between blacks and whites. Helena Murphy (née Clarke), a founding member, saw it as representing identity and people of mixed ancestry, while others felt it expressed a desire for collaboration and change. The Coolbaroo League became part of a wider movement for Aboriginal rights. It raised awareness of issues affecting Aboriginal people, including the restricted entry for Noongars into the inner city.
- 1949 – The police were upset at the jails being full of the strikers, and being used politically. The Mount Edgar Agreement offered Aboriginal people unequal wages at $6 weekly, but few strikers returned to the stations. It was clear that Aboriginal people wanted freedom from Aboriginal semi-slave labour conditions. 600 Aboriginal people formed their own mining company.
- 1950 and following – Attempts were made to evacuate the last traditional Aboriginal people from the western desert, in order to clear the area for British Blue Streak missile testing from the Woomera Rocket Range. The government opposed a private member's bill extending citizenship to the children of Aboriginal citizens.
- 1951 – The citizenship clause for Aboriginal people was amended so that they now had to get approval of both a magistrate and a representative of the local municipality, reducing the chance of Aboriginal people becoming citizens. The Korean War minerals boom brought prosperity to Aboriginal people on strike in the northwest. Their mining company grossed $100,000, and with these profits Aboriginal strikers were able to purchase five stations centred upon Yandereena. This was the first new land owned by Aboriginal people since before 1911. A hospital, school, and accommodations for the aged was established by the first self-determinating Aboriginal group since Katanning. Don McLeod entered into a partnership with the Adelaide syndicate Western Wolfram, and then the world prices fell.

The Nedlands Road Board, without warning, bulldozed the Swanbourne Aboriginal campsite, without replacing homes for the displaced. No one complained and the media reports applauded the Road Board action.

More than 50% of the Kimberley population is found to have trachoma to some extent.

- January 1952 – A new Native Welfare Council (NWC) is established, at the request of the Minister for Native Affairs, with branches in country towns, to extend citizenship to all Aboriginal people. In 1963 the NWC became the Aboriginal Advancement Council of Western Australia, co-founded by George Abdullah.
- 1953 – The Coolbaroo League publishes its first bi-monthly newspaper, Westralian Aborigine. The newspaper offered an alternative to the mainstream press and was significant in that it had Aboriginal editorial control and gave a voice to Noongar people. The paper had some 600 subscribers. The Coolbaroo dances were advertised there, as well as jobs. Sometimes, you could just be looking for a person you'd not seen in a while.
- April 1954 – Queen Elizabeth II, during her tour of Western Australia, "crowns" David Beaufort's lineal descendant as "king of the Bibulmun".
- 1954 – The new Native Welfare Act 1954 did nothing to limit the removal powers under the 1936 Act, which continued unabated. In 1963, however, amendments to the Act repealed previous legislation and abolished the Chief Protector's powers to remove children of Aboriginal descent from their biological parents. Nevertheless, the removal of Aboriginal children continued under the arbitrary implementation of the broad provisions of the Child Welfare Act 1947. The prohibited area was finally abandoned in 1954, when the Coolbaroo League was allowed to hold a ball at the Perth Town Hall.
- 1962 – Frank Ellis Gare was Commissioner for Native Welfare from 1962 to 1972.
- 1963 – The Native Welfare Act repealed the Aborigines Act 1905, but the ability to remove Aboriginal children from their families (i.e. the Stolen Generations policy) remained in force.
- 1964 – As a result of the Blue Streak Missile Testing, Patrol Officers discovered a large group of woman and children living a traditional life in the area of Kumpupintil Lake. They were "brought in" and settled at Jigalong. See the movie Contact for details of the story.
- 1972 – A departmental reorganisation resulted in the functions of the then Native Welfare Department being split between two new departments, the Aboriginal Affairs Planning Authority (AAPA) and the Department of Community Welfare (now the Department for Community Development), responsible for the care and placement of Aboriginal children in the welfare sector. The role of commissioner ended with the creation of the Department of Community Welfare. The creation of the AAPA led to the end of the "Stolen Generation" as, for the first time, policies were enacted that allowed children of Aboriginal descent considered at risk of neglect to be fostered first and foremost by other members of their families. In this way, a century of acute suffering finally came to an end, while leaving a legacy of extensive cultural genocide of Aboriginal groups south of the 26th parallel.
- 1980 – The Aboriginal Treaty Support Group formed in Western Australia; it ran for three years, until the election of the Burke Labor government, which was committed to land rights.
- 1981 – Australian Democrat Senator Colin Mason agreed to present a private members bill for Aboriginal land rights in Western Australia, and a first draft prepared by a party member in Perth is reviewed by parliamentary counsel.
- 1984 – The Burke government put through an Aboriginal land bill supported by a variety of interest groups after extensive consultation, but it was defeated by two National Party votes in the Legislative Council.
- 16 October 1987 – Prime Minister Bob Hawke launched the Muirhead Royal Commission inquiry into deaths in custody; the commission found that Western Australia had the greatest number of cases to be heard, with 36 deaths being reported to the commission. Of those, 32 were found to be within jurisdiction and reported upon.
- 28 June 1988 – A hearing into the death of Charles Michael took place. Due to the enormity of the task in Western Australia with the number of deaths to be investigated and the size of the state, it was decided that another Commissioner was needed to assist with the conduct of inquiries.
- 27 October 1988 – Commonwealth letters patent were issued to conduct inquiries into the deaths of Aboriginals who had died in custody in Western Australia, and elsewhere in Australia, as directed by Commissioner Muirhead.
- 30 May 1989 – Presentation of the Royal Commission into Aboriginal Deaths in Custody. Very many of the recommendations were never implemented, leading to a continuation of the problem of Aboriginal deaths in custody.
- 3 June 1992 – The High Court of Australia—in the case Eddie Mabo versus the state of Queensland, the opinion written by Justice Gerard Brennan—ruled for the first time in Australian history that Indigenous people do have legal rights to land in Australia, and that the doctrine of terra nullius did not apply.

== 1992 Year of Indigenous Peoples–present ==
- 10 December 1992 – In launching the International Year of Indigenous Peoples, Prime Minister Paul Keating, in his Redfern Address, stated: "It was we who did the dispossessing. We took the traditional lands and smashed the traditional way of life. We brought the diseases. The alcohol. We committed the murders. We took the children from their mothers. We practised discrimination and exclusion. It was our ignorance and our prejudice. And our failure to imagine these things being done to us."
- October 1994 – The Federal Minister for Aboriginal Affairs. addressing the Going Home Conference in Darwin, announced he would be writing to Michael Levarch, the Attorney-General, with the suggestion that the Equal Rights and Opportunities Commission investigate why thousands of Aboriginal children had been separated from their families and communities in the 20th century.
- 1994 – The Australian Bureau of Statistics found that 10.1% of aboriginals aged between twenty five years of age and 44 years of age had been separated from their families, and that 10.6% of those aged more than 44 had suffered the same.
- 1 June 1995 – Formation of the Indigenous Land Corporation (ILC), a Commonwealth statutory authority with national responsibilities to assist Indigenous peoples to acquire land and to manage Indigenous-held land. The ILC has a seven-member board, appointed by the Minister for Indigenous Affairs. The chairperson and at least four other members of the Board must be Indigenous. The ILC Board makes all policy and land acquisition decisions, following the Mabo decision and federal legislation.
- 1996 – Inquiry headed by Ronald Wilson, former High Court judge and President of the Human Rights and Equal Opportunity Commission, and Mick Dodson, Social Justice Commissioner, spent two years collecting oral and written evidence across Australia, with the assistance of all Australian governments except the Howard Commonwealth Government, which denied them access to Northern Territory records, and refused the inquiry's request for additional funds. Dr. Eric Hunter conducted a report on Aboriginal people in the Kimberley and found that one quarter of elderly Aboriginal people and one-in-seven of those middle-aged had been separated from their families.
- December 1996 – The Wik People versus Queensland case demonstrated that pastoral agreements do not extinguish native title as established under the Mabo judgement. This in 1998 required modification of the Native Title Tribunal legislation of 1994.
- 26 May 1997 – The Bringing Them Home report, presented to the federal government, confirmed that Aboriginal people from 1910 until the 1970s saw the removal of between one-in-three to one-in-ten Aboriginal children who had suffered "gross violation of their human rights" and comprised "an act of genocide, aimed at wiping out Indigenous families, communities and cultures".
- June 1997 – Australians for Native Title launch the "Sorry Book" initiative to give ordinary Australians a chance to respond to the failure of the federal government to unreservedly apologize given the findings of the Bringing Them Home report. The books became a popular way for ordinary Australians to express their desires for reconciliation.
- 6 September 1997 – Robert Bropho sued cartoonist Dean Acheson of the Western Australian for a cartoon that offensively characterized the struggle amongst Western Australian Noongars after the return of Yagan's head to the state.
- 26 May 1998 – Declared "Sorry Day" as an annual day of celebration of reconciliation between Aboriginal communities and non-Indigenous Australians.
- 6 March 2000 – Richard Court, premier of Western Australia, failed to achieve a modification of native title legislation, modelled on the failed Liberal federal government legislation in the Northern Territory, after having spent millions of dollars of taxpayers' money in an attempt to secure the extinguishment of native title on pastoral leases in Western Australia, in contravention of the Wik ruling.
- 2000 – The Spinifex People of the Eastern Wangai were the second Western Australian group to be awarded land under the native title ruling,
- December 2002 – The Gordon Inquiry, "Putting People First", was tabled in the Western Australian parliament. The report stressed

- The urgent need to strengthen and improve responses to abuse and violence in Aboriginal communities.
- The need for long-term strategies and solutions to address the endemic nature of abuse and violence in many communities.
- Meeting the needs of current and future generations of Aboriginal children through simultaneous, long-term environmental, social, and economic improvements that would result in sustainable communities.

- 10 August 2004 – The collection of 461 Sorry Books, out of the estimated 1,000 that were produced, held by the Australian Institute of Aboriginal and Torres Strait Islander Studies (AIATSIS) library was inscribed on the UNESCO Australian Memory of the World Register.
- 2005 – The Roelands Mission site was acquired by the Indigenous Land Corporation (ILC) for the Woolkabunning Kiaka Association, representing the former residents. Shirley McPherson, Chairperson of the Indigenous Land Corporation, said that the ILC's ability to move quickly on an application from the Woolkabunning Kiaka Association, representing the former residents, demonstrated the soundness of its application processes.
- 2006 – An amendment was made to the Aboriginal and Torres Strait Islander Act of 2005, to establish Indigenous Business Australia, a Corporation with an independent board, responsible to the Minister of Indigenous Affairs, to engage in commercial activities and to promote and encourage Aboriginal and Torres Strait Islander self-management and economic self-sufficiency.
- 16 September 2006 – The ruling by Supreme Court Judge Wilcox, in the Bennell versus Western Australia case, confirmed the survival of the Noongar people and their customary title to lands in the southwest corner of Western Australia. "Justice Wilcox found the Noongar community had continued to exist despite the descent system being disrupted through mixed marriage and people being forced off their land and dispersed to other areas as a result of European settlement. Justice Wilcox said families had kept in contact. Many, if not most, children learned at least some Noongar language while traditional skills, beliefs and as much as possible, land laws, had been preserved. As a consequence, Justice Wilcox found there was a case for native title". The Labor Party government of Alan Carpenter announced that they would appeal the case.
- 14 May 2007 – The ABC Lateline program reported graphic details of rampant sexual abuse of Aboriginal children, details from the Roger report on "Child Sexual Assault and Some Cultural Issues in the Northern Territory."
- 21 May 2007 – A report found that Aboriginal people are "grossly disadvantaged in negotiations with miners because the Native Title Tribunal had failed for more than a decade to exercise its veto over mining leases". As a result, companies have known leases would be granted even if negotiations failed; and Aboriginal groups had been forced to agree to "grossly inadequate compensation packages", because their "hands are tied behind their backs". As a result, Aboriginal groups are seriously missing out on the resources boom currently propelling growth in the Australian economy.
- 31 May 2007 – The Western Australian state government announced, on the 40th Anniversary of the 1967 referendum, that it would investigate wages stolen from Aboriginal people. Up to 75% of all Aboriginal Wages paid to Aboriginal people, according to provisions of the 1905 Aboriginal Act, were held in trust by the state government and never repaid, following the "Stolen Wages" enquiry of the Australian federal senate. Brian Wyatt of the Goldfields Land and Sea Council, announced that for the Goldfields Region alone the amount could amount to $150 million. The Queensland government had set up a special compensation fund of $56 million in 2002, and the New South Wales government had set up a compensation scheme in 2005.
- 21 June 2007 – Australia's Aboriginal peoples were stripped of the right of self-rule after the government declared the widespread sexual abuse of Aboriginal children to be a national emergency equivalent to the Katrina Hurricane in the USA. John Howard, the prime minister, banned the sale of alcohol across an area the size of France and imposed restrictions on access to pornography. He also announced tight controls on welfare benefits, which would be cut if children failed to attend school. Aboriginal families would be required to spend at least half their fortnightly welfare on food and essentials.
- 25 July 2007 – The federal Minister of Aboriginal Affairs, Mal Brough, announced his intention to abolish the Community Development Employment Program, a "work for the dole scheme", which enabled Aboriginal people in many remote areas to obtain work in not-for-profit Aboriginal-run organisations providing subsidised services to remote Aboriginal communities, services not provided by conventional government or industry. As this was the major source of employment for these areas, unemployment in remote Aboriginal communities would be likely to rise from 30% to over 50%, and the quality of life experienced by people living in such areas would be expected to fall.
- 5 August 2007 – The high rate of suicide in Indigenous communities in Western Australia would be scrutinised by the state coroner, Alastair Hope. ABC News reported that the coordinator of the Kimberley Aboriginal Law and Culture Centre, Wes Morris, said that there was a recent public meeting of 180 residents concerned about the high number of suicides. "In addition to the suicides there is also the large number of accidental deaths and we know that one of the root causes of both the suicides and the accidental deaths is the high rate of alcohol use in this community", he said. "There's absolute despair in the community. There's so many families within the community who have been affected in such a deep and personal way."
- 5 September 2007 – The results of the 2006 Census showed that the average life-expectancy of Aboriginal people was 17 years less than non-Aboriginal Western Australians. Survival at birth for Aboriginal people in Western Australia was less than that in rural Bangladesh.
- 14 November 2007 – The Hope Inquest into Aboriginal Deaths in Fitzroy Crossing, held in Broome, Western Australia, was told that the Western Australian Department of Indigenous Affairs lacked a plan for Indigenous public housing, drugs, alcohol, or life skills in the Kimberley.
- 26 November 2007 – The election of the Rudd Labor government put many of the Aboriginal changes foreshadowed by John Howard's Liberal Party government on hold. Kevin Rudd indicated that he would make a formal apology to the Aboriginal people for their suffering in consequence of the Stolen Generations.
- 2008 – all Australian governments signed the National Indigenous Reform Agreement (NIRA). NIRA, which was endorsed by the Council of Australian Governments (COAG), included six outcome-based reform targets for "Closing the Gap":
  - Close the life expectancy gap by 2031.
  - Halve the child mortality rate by 2018.
  - That all four-year-old children in remote areas have access to early childhood education by 2013.
  - Halve the gap in reading, writing, and numeracy achievements by 2018.
  - Halve the gap in Year 12, or equivalent attainment, by 2020.
  - Halve the gap in employment by 2018.
- 13 February 2008 – William Deane and former prime ministers Paul Keating, Bob Hawke, Gough Whitlam, and Malcolm Fraser were all seated on the floor of the parliament to hear Prime Minister Kevin Rudd deliver, at the recommendation of the "Bringing Them Home" report, a formal apology on the part of the Australian nation for the suffering inflicted as a result of the stolen generations. Conspicuous by his absence was former Prime Minister John Howard. Western Australian polls showed the state to be least in favour of an apology.
- 26 February 2008 – The final report of the Hope coroner's enquiry into 22 deaths in the Kimberley stated that conditions have been worsening: remedial education was not available for children who get left behind in education, fetal alcohol syndrome stunted the development of many Aboriginal children, and suicide rates were high. Despite spending $1.2 million a year on the problems, there was a lack of leadership at state and commonwealth levels, and the funding was divided between 22 non-government and government programs. The Aboriginal-owned pub at Fitzroy Crossing has not returned profits to the owners in 18 years (all profits being taken by white managers). The government was accused of ignoring the earlier report of General John Sanderson on these issues Carol Martin, the first Aboriginal woman in Western Australian parliament, says that the Hope report has nothing that people did not already know. The Kimberley Aboriginal Law and Cultural Centre (KALACC) says that despite their submission there was no recommendation concerning specialised services for the young.
- 28 February 2008 – Aboriginal leader Robert Bropho was jailed for three years for indecency with a young girl. District court judge Peter Nisbet said that Bropho, 78, was arrogant, a bully, and a repeat liar who had committed an act of "cynical depravity" when he bailed the young girl out of a juvenile detention centre, then raped her on the way home. After hearing DNA evidence, Judge Nisbet found Bropho was the father of two of the victim's children.
- 2008 – Elder Mr Ward died from heat stroke on a four-hour journey in a prison van in the Western Australian outback.
- 2011 – WorkSafe prosecution over Ward's death resulted in prison for a private operator, two of the private operator's staff also being heavily fined, and the Department of Corrective Services being fined $285,000.
- 2011 – The Oombulgurri Community closed after a history of violence.
- February 2012 – A Noongar Tent Embassy was set up on Heirisson Island to oppose the West Australian government's proposed $1 billion over-10-year deal to extinguish the native land title of southwestern 30,000 Noongar people. After three police raids the tents were removed by Western Australian police on 22 March.
- 6 March 2012 – Under past legislation, such as the Aborigines Act 1905 and the Native Welfare Act 1963, employers of Aboriginal people, including successive state governments between 1905 and 1972, held 75% of the wages and property belonging to Aboriginal people in a complex network of trust accounts, and that was never delivered to them. The Western Australian government announced that it would recompense each Aboriginal person, still living and able to give evidence that entitlements were withheld from them, $2,000 for these stolen wages, becoming the 3rd Australian state to attempt some reimbursement. Indigenous Affairs Minister Peter Collier said that most of the documentation concerning the accounts and monies held in trust had been lost, along with verification of who was affected and how much was held. Payments for Aboriginal victims of stolen wages were labelled "an insult" by local Aboriginal businessman and cultural awareness trainer Kado Muir.
- 21 March 2012 – The Kimberley Aboriginal Law and Cultural Centre was campaigning to have repealed, in accordance with a 2006 recommendation by the Western Australian Law Reform Commission, the 1972 Law that if an Aboriginal Person dies without a will, all assets of that person do not go to family members (as for non-Aboriginal deaths), but are taken by the Public Trustee.
- 2014 – COAG agreed to an additional target on school attendance, as a part of the Closing the Gap program, a goal of achieving 90 per cent student attendance rates by 2018.
- 14 March 2015 – After indicating that it was going to close 150 settlements, more than half of the 276 Aboriginal settlement communities of Western Australia. after the commonwealth government withdrew $30 million for the provision of services, the prime minister, Tony Abbott, angered aboriginal leaders around the country by calling such settlements on traditional lands a "lifestyle choice" of the residents. A refugee camp established to protest state treatment of Aboriginal people over many years, on Heirisson Island, was ringed by police after Perth City Council declared the camp illegal. The tents and bedding of the protesters were stolen.
- 28 April 2015 – Deregistration of the Burrup Peninsula as an Aboriginal sacred site, despite the fact that it contained Aboriginal rock art going back 50,000 years, and the earliest human portrait in the world. It was suggested that the deregistration of this and 300 Aboriginal sacred sites in Western Australia was revenge on the part of the Barnett government over its loss of the James Price Point battle in the Kimberley.
- 6 September 2015 – Calculations of the stolen wages reparation scheme were made, that 75% of the wages of Aboriginal workers until 1972 were withheld by the state, costing $71 million and affecting up to 3,000 workers. Previously, in 2012, the state government claimed that the figure was just $2.5 million, and was offering claimants only $2,000. Peter Collier, Minister for Aboriginal Affairs in the Barnett government, was accused of going slow on the settlement and waiting for claimants to die.
- 23 September 2015 – The release of progress report on Closing the Gap reported that improvements in infant mortality were unlikely to be met and that maternal health increased by only 2.2%. Death rates per 10,000 children aged 0–5 were 69 for non-Aboriginal children but 207 for Aboriginal children, and the gap in life expectancy was widening, 65 years of age for Aboriginal populations (under 60 for Aboriginal men) and over 80 years for the non-Aboriginal population. Suicide rates and unemployment rates had increased.
- 6 March 2017 – More than 100 indigenous leaders in Perth threw their support behind calls for a treaty between Aboriginal people and the federal government. Gordon Cole, a co-convenor at the Indigenous Referendum Council, said that the 120 delegates from the Murchison, Gascoyne, Goldfields, Pilbara, and the South West complained that Aboriginal people were not properly represented in Parliament.
- 26 February 2017 – Both major parties field Aboriginal candidates for election for the first time in Western Australian history. Aboriginal candidate Ben Wyatt was set to become Western Australian treasurer, the highest political post ever held by an Aboriginal person in Western Australia.
- May 2020 – The Rio Tinto mining company destroyed Juukan Gorge and two Aboriginal Heritage sites that had deep historical and cultural significance, dating back 46,000 years. The shelters were the only inland sites that showed Aboriginal occupation during the last Ice Age. Under the Aboriginal Heritage Act 1972 the Aboriginal owners had no right to appeal against the decision given 12 months previously to Rio Tinto to proceed.
- 16 March 2022 – New evidence from Newcastle University revealed that over 10,000 Aboriginal people lost their lives in over 400 massacres in Australia. 138 non-Indigenous people lost their lives in 13 of these.
- 16 July 2023 – Resources Minister Madeleine King, a Western Australian, teamed up with Greens Aboriginal Senator Dorinda Cox and Teal Ms Chaney in a cross-party push ahead of the publication on Tuesday of the official YES and NO Referendum cases in advance of the release of the official YES and NO pamphlet.

== See also ==
- Aboriginal groupings of Western Australia
- Aboriginal Community - Rotary Western Australia - Aboriginal Reference Group
