= Concerns and controversies at the 2018 Commonwealth Games =

A number of notable controversies and concerns associated with the 2018 Commonwealth Games in Gold Coast, Australia emerged which were the subject of public debate and media commentary.

== Games ceremonies ==
=== Contract award ===
Three Australian companies: Specktak International, World Events, Dae Global and one American company Jack Morton Worldwide (JMW) submitted bids to the Gold Coast 2018 Commonwealth Games Corporation (GOLDOC) to produce the opening and closing ceremonies of the 2018 Commonwealth Games in Gold Coast. On 27 December 2015, the GOLDOC announced they chose JMW to produce the ceremonies of the games. This sparked an anger among the officials of all the three Australian Companies questioned to GOLDOC that why an American company (JMW) was chosen for the production of ceremonies which was going to happen in Australia. An official from the GOLDOC said that JMW is an international company who had been working in Australia since 1983 and had a range of experiences in producing the ceremonies of events as they had previously done for 2004 Summer Olympics in Athens, 2006 Commonwealth Games in Melbourne and the 2014 Commonwealth Games in Glasgow. They also said that the JMW's bid came from its Australian branch and not from its main American Branch.

=== Opening ceremony ===
The opening ceremony of the 2018 Commonwealth Games had numerous controversies and was criticised by the public and media for the following reasons:

==== Ticket printing error ====
Just 50 days before the opening of the Games, it was found that over 14,000 tickets for the Games opening ceremony event had the wrong day printed on them (Thursday), instead of the correct day (Wednesday). An official from the GOLDOC said the issue was due to a “human error”. They also commented that no problems were encountered with the other 90% of the tickets sold for other events and the wrong printed tickets wouldn't be recalled. They assured to the ticketholders that their opening ceremony passes were still valid, despite the wrong day.

==== Protest ====
A group of Aboriginal activists established Camp Freedom in Doug Jennings Park on the Southport Spit to protest the Commonwealth Games. Indigenous peoples from every state and territory as well as some Maori people were present at the camp. This continued a long history of protesting the Commonwealth Games when they're held in Australia and many of the 2018 protesters were relatives of those who protested at the 1982, and 2006 Commonwealth Games. The opening ceremony of the Games was held up by protests by a group of Indigenous Australians. Before the ceremony, the protesters blocked the route of the Queen's Baton Relay, as it was under way in the suburb of Southport, which caused the run to be halted for about an hour. A protester told host broadcaster Seven Network,

Today what we wanted to do was to make it clear to the mob, make it clear to the world and make it clear to our people that we’re standing strong. And we don’t want nothing of the Commonwealth here. They’ve stolen the land, built this country on stolen wages, built this country on the blood and bones of our people. And it’s about time that history is acknowledged and about time that the royal families who are responsible for it all - that they come down here and get at our level and ask to be here on our country. That’s what needs to happen.

During the opening ceremony, over hundred Aboriginal people protested outside the Carrara Stadium, the venue of the ceremony. The protesters waved black, red and yellow Aboriginal flags and chanted "No justice, no games". According to the Australian Associated Press, three demonstrators who tried to enter the stadium without tickets, were arrested by police. The protesters called the event "The Stolenwealth Games" referring to the fact that Australia become part of the Commonwealth by stealing Aboriginal land. One protester shouted through a megaphone "I'm here to tell the rest of the Commonwealth that the Aboriginal nations of Australia have not ceded their sovereignty". Three protesters were arrested after clashing with police outside the stadium and were charged with one count of public nuisance.

==== Performers' fees ====
The GOLDOC offered only A$2000 to the artists and singers to perform a song at the opening ceremony. Viewers of the opening ceremony also criticised that the ceremony lacked performances from Australia's big-name artists.

=== Closing ceremony ===
The closing ceremony of the 2018 Commonwealth Games was criticised by the public and media for the following reasons

==== Athletes' attendance ====
For operational reasons, the GOLDOC had decided that the athletes still on the Gold Coast would enter the Carrara Stadium during the pre-show, before the ceremony began, which was not broadcast and played only on the big screen within the venue to entertain the crowds. This was certainly not a decision without precedent. It was deemed necessary for operationally related athlete welfare reasons and had been briefed to the Commonwealth Games Federation (CGF) which had approved the plan. It was also briefed into official athlete representatives some weeks before the event and also to host broadcast representatives many weeks in advance of the Games. In fact, all key stakeholders were aware and had signed off on the proposed plan well before the closing ceremony aired.

The television broadcast featured relatively few images of the athletes; whose celebration traditionally forms a focus of the closing ceremony. However, the media failed to report that athlete attendance on the night was the lowest in Commonwealth Games history (many elected to attend a Channel 7 party in the city) and plans to recognise and explicitly celebrate all the athletes present during the early performance of a singer had to be curtailed as there were actually too few athletes on the field of play to deliver the desired broadcast images.

Post ceremony the media offered a skewed account of events which was never actually contradicted or corrected by the stakeholders (GOLDOC, CGF, etc.) who had signed off on the plan. At no time was attention drawn to the lack of athlete presence in the stadium or the fact that many of them were attending a party held by Channel 7 - one of the most vocal critical voices and also one of the stakeholders that had been briefed well in advance event. With hindsight, the low athlete attendance on the night was foreshadowed during the opening ceremony which also fell victim to poor and many felt disrespectful with the athlete attendance.

==== Chairman's response ====
The day after the closing ceremony, GOLDOC Chairman Peter Beattie apologised for not showing the athletes and also for too many speeches in the closing ceremony. Queensland Premier Annastacia Palaszczuk said she was also disappointed that the athletes were not able to march during the ceremony, laying the blame on GOLDOC. Again, with hindsight, these criticisms were proved to be premature and ill-informed.

== No-needle policy violation ==
=== Warning to Indian doctor ===
A cleaner found needles in a water bottle at the Athletes' village just two days before the opening of the Games. The Games officials were shocked to see those needles as the event has a no-needle policy, which meant that the athletes and team officials were not allowed to use or carry needles during their stay in the Athletes' village. Grevemberg said he could not identify which team was involved. Later, an official of the Indian team said their team had found the syringes in a water bottle outside their accommodation and they gave it to the Games medical authorities for analysis. The GOLDOC launched an investigation, and carried out dope tests on 12 athletes. The syringe were examined for its contents. After the tests, the athletes were asked to sign an undertaking that they did not possess any more syringes and restrictions were put on them, including a ban on leaving the Athletes' Village after 10 pm. Another official of the Indian team also said that the needles were found in the common area of the building and no Indian team member was involved in it. An India team doctor admitted he injected a vitamin B complex to a member of the Indian team, which was in clear violation of the Games' no-needle policy. It was also found that the doctor was aware of the no needle policy and to have breached articles I and II of the policy in that he left needles in the room while he went to the Polyclinic to obtain sharp bins for the disposal of the needles. As a result, the Indian team received a serious letter of reprimand warning them against any further breaches of the policy.

=== Suspension of Indian athletes ===
Later, the Games officials suspended two Indian athletes from the event for breaching the no-needle policy and were immediately removed from the Athletes' village. CGF President Louise Martin said that the cleaners had found the needle in a cup in the apartment assigned to two athletes. Investigators from the Australian Sports Anti-Doping Authority then searched their room and found another needle in a bag which belonged to one of those two athletes. Under Games rules only medical practitioners and athletes with an approved medical condition requiring auto-injection such as diabetes were allowed to bring needles into the athletes’ village. That was the second time Team India violated the Games no-needles policy. As well as the athletes’ suspensions, serious warnings were issued to Indian officials including the team's chef de mission that any further breaches could result in suspension of accreditation.

== Missing athletes ==
At least 13 athletes from four countries - Cameroon, Uganda, Rwanda, and Sierra Leone - absconded during or immediately after the Games. Some missed their competitions. Athletes regularly abscond during major sporting events, and many subsequently claim asylum in their host countries. Most hold nationalities that are deemed high-risk by immigration authorities and find it impossible to get visas outside of exceptional events, such as major games. A month after the games ended, officials estimated that fifty athletes had remained in Australia illegally, with another 200 staying in the country on visas.

In October 2019, it was found from the official documents that the Department of Home Affairs had rejected the asylum claims of 217 out of 230 athletes. The official documents also found that 17 "unlawful non-citizens" who took part in the Commonwealth Games were still in Australia, 14 of which were from Ghana and Rwanda. A total of 13 remain unaccounted for, while four were in detention. A third of the Cameroon team went missing after the Games.
