= Korung National Park =

National park in Western Australia

- IUCN category II (national park)
- Location within Western Australia
- Korung National Park (●) is on edge of Darling Scarp
- Location: Perth metropolitan region, Western Australia
- Nearest city: Armadale and Kalamunda
- Coordinates: 32.05075°S 116.094614°E
- Area: 63.54 km^{2} (24.53 sq mi)
- Designation: National park
- Designated: 2004
- Administrator: Department of Biodiversity, Conservation and Attractions

Korung National Park, formerly Pickering Brook National Park, is a national park in Western Australia. It is located 26 kilometres (16 mi) south-east of Perth, on edge of Darling Scarp overlooking the Swan Coastal Plain.

The park was designated in 2004. It was formerly known as Pickering Brook National Park until 2008. It adjoins Midgegooroo National Park on the south.

== Flora and fauna ==
Western portions of the park lie in the Swan Coastal Plain bioregion. The portion of the park east of the Darling Scarp lies in the Jarrah Forest bioregion.

== Recreation ==
There are numerous walk trails through the park. The Munda Biddi Trail, a 1,000-kilometre (620 mi) bike trail, runs through the park.
