= Midgegooroo National Park =

National park in Western Australia

- Interactive map of Midgegooroo National Park
- Type: National park
- Location: Perth metropolitan region
- Coordinates: 32°07′46″S 116°08′54″E
- Area: 2,492 ha (6,160 acres)
- Established: 2004
- Administrator: Department of Biodiversity, Conservation and Attractions

Midgegooroo National Park, formerly the Canning National Park, is a national park in the Perth metropolitan region of Western Australia, 43 kilometres (27 mi) south-east of Perth. It is located in the City of Armadale, and part of the Jarrah Forest bioregion.

Midgegooroo National Park was created as Class A reserve No. 47884 on 30 November 2004 with a size of 2,492 hectares (6,160 acres) as one of nine national parks proclaimed in the state that day.

The national park, on land whose traditional owners are the Whadjuk people, was renamed in 2008 after Midgegooroo, an Australian Aboriginal elder executed in 1833 for his resistance to European settlement by the settlers. It was one of a number of national and regional parks to be renamed in the state at this point, among them the Pickering Brook National Park, which borders Midgegooroo to the north, and was renamed Korung National Park.

The main features in the national park are Canning Dam and the Munda Biddi Trail, a long-distance mostly off-road cycling trail, which passes through the park.
