= Coolbaroo League =

Western Australian Aboriginal social club

Coordinates: 31.948728°S 115.872148°E

The Coolbaroo League (also Coolbaroo Club) was a Western Australian Aboriginal social club. Newspaper reports in the 1950s frequently provided the translation of the name as Magpie.

== History ==
The club was founded in 1946 by brothers Jack and Bill Poland, Lena Clarke, and Geoffrey Harcus, and ceased in the early 1960s. Harcus and the Poland brothers were returned servicemen, and the Poland brothers and Clarke were Aboriginal.

Between 1954 and 1957, it published the Westralian Aborigine, a magazine that focused on Aborginal and Torres Strait Islander issues.

The club hosted many dances and events, and hosted many Black entertainers, including Nat King Cole, Harold Blair, Albert Namatjira and the Harlem Globetrotters.

In 1996, a documentary was made about the club. The film's summary stated,

Coolbaroo was the only Aboriginal-run dance club in a city which practised unofficial apartheid, submitting Aboriginal people to harassment, identity cards, fraternisation bans and curfews.

Despite the success of lessening restrictions in the 1954 Native Welfare Act, conditions in Perth were still problematic for the majority of Aboriginal people living in the metropolitan area. The club became a political organisation, and after 1962 when the organisation ceased, members focused on the Aboriginal Advancement League and the 1967 referendum.

== See also ==
- Timeline of Aboriginal history of Western Australia
- Perth Prohibited Area
