= Midgegooroo =

Aboriginal Australian executed without trial in 1833

Midgegooroo (died 22 May 1833) was an Australian Aboriginal elder of the Nyungar nation, who played a key role in Aboriginal resistance to white settlement in the area of Perth, Western Australia. Everything documented about Midgegooroo (variously spelled in records as "Midgeegaroo", "Midgegarew", "Midgegoorong", Midgegoroo", Midjegoorong", "Midjigoroo", "Midgigeroo", Midjigeroo", "Migegaroo", "Migegaroom", "Migegooroo", "Midgecarro", "Widgegooroo") is mediated through the eyes of colonisers, some of whom, notably George Fletcher Moore, Robert Menli Lyon and Francis Armstrong, derived their information from discussions with contemporary Noongar people, in particular the son of Midgegooroo, Yagan. Largely due to his exploits in opposing colonisation and his relationship with Lyon and Moore, Yagan has a much sharper historical profile than his father. Midgegooroo was executed by firing squad without trial under the authority of Lieutenant Governor Frederick Irwin in 1833.

== Early life ==
Nothing is known of Midgegooroo's life prior to the arrival of white settlers in 1829. At the time, Midgegooroo was the leader of his home country, Beeliar, which stretched from the Indian Ocean to the Canning River, south of the Swan River. Robert Menli Lyon reported that the northernmost land in Beeliar adjoined "Melville Water and the Canning", and was bordered "by the mountains on the east; by the sea on the west; and by a line, due east, from Mangles Bay, on the south". Midgegooroo's main camp ("headquarters") was known as "Mendyarrup, situated somewhere in Gaudoo", suggesting that it was in the vicinity of Blackwall Reach and Point Walter. (Note: Robert Menli Lyon may have acquired most of this information from Yagan rather than Midgegooroo. In 1832, Lyon had intervened on behalf of Yagan and two of his countrymen, Domera and Ningina who had been captured and awaited sentence for spearing a colonist William Gaze in June. Lyon persuaded Lieutenant-Governor Frederick Irwin to allow him to accompany the three prisoners to Carnac Island to "acquire a knowledge of their language and prevent that frightful state of things in which the deliberate shedding of blood will involve the settlement". For a month, Lyon and the three Aboriginal men were alone on the island, during which time they taught him about the language and society of the people of the Swan River region, including the names of places.) However, Midgegooroo's family had some rights to use resources on a large part of what is now metropolitan Perth, and were able to move freely about an even larger area, presumably due to kinship ties with neighbours. For example, he was seen on some occasions as far afield as Galup and the Helena River.

In 1830, Midgegooroo was reported to be an older man, short in stature with long hair and a "remarkable bump" on his forehead, a physical description repeated on occasion over the next two and a half years, including in a deposition presented in evidence before his execution. Midgegooroo appears to have remained aloof from the colonists. There is evidence that he occasionally engaged in friendly communications with some local farmers, including Erin Entwhistle, a man he speared in 1831. Unlike some other named Aboriginal people of the region, including Yagan, Weeip and Yellagonga, Midgegooroo does not appear to have ever performed casual labour for colonists in any capacity, and continued to move around Beeliar with his wives and children. He was described as consistently hostile to the presence of Europeans on his country; "a dangerous and furious ruffian". He had at least two wives, the older described as "rather tall and wanting her front teeth", the younger of whom was named Ganiup, and at least four sons, Yagan, Narral, Billy and Willim, and at least one brother. (Note: G. F. Moore comments that Yagan may in fact have been the biological son of Midgegooroo's brother, although as an uncle he would likely have been considered his classificatory father.) He appears to have spent much of his time "taking care of the women and children of the tribe".

== Conflicts with white settlers ==
Early relationships between Noongars and colonists at the Swan River Colony have been documented, demonstrating the existing occupants of the Swan and Canning River area's opposition to colonisation, initially manifested by shouted warnings and aggressive postures, but increasingly through hostility and violence. Lieutenant Governor James Stirling, in his proclamation of the colony in June 1829, warned that Aboriginal people were protected by British laws and any colonist convicted of "behaving in a fraudulent, cruel or felonious Manner towards the Aborigines of the Country" would be dealt with "as if the same had been committed against any other of His Majesty's subjects". Nonetheless, the first ten years of colonisation witnessed a significant level of violence in which a number of Europeans and Aboriginal people died. The actual death toll is unknown, but the number of Aboriginal dead far exceeds the losses in the European community.

Swan River colonisers in the first four years of the settlement initially failed to record the names of the Aboriginal people of the Swan River region, but it is highly likely that Midgegooroo would have been one of those who observed the first British explorations in 1827 and the subsequent establishment in June 1829 of the port of Fremantle, the capital at Perth, satellite settlements at Guildford and further inland at York, and the network of small farms around the area. His first appearance in the colonial record may have been in May 1830 when an old man, tentatively identified by Sylvia Hallam and Lois Tilbrook as Midgegooroo, was found plucking two turkeys which had been stolen from a farm on the Canning River and subsequently beaten by a military detachment. The next day, a group of eight Aboriginal men, including "Dencil", attacked a farm near Kelmscott and injured a settler named J.R. Phillips "with whom they had always been friendly". If Hallam and Tilbrook are correct that the old man was Midgegooroo, he would have been subjected to European violence in retaliation for actions he did not fully comprehend quite early in their colonisation.

In December 1830, Midgegooroo was camping by Galup when two white labourers, who were passing by, stopped to shake hands with a group of Aboriginal women. When the two men returned later that day, Midgegooroo scared them off by threatening to spear one of them.

In approximately February 1831, Midgegooroo was reported to have come to Lionel Samson's store in Fremantle and was given biscuits by a servant James Lacey.

Midgegooroo was not satisfied, I was obliged to put him out of the store by force. As I was in the act of shutting the door he threw a spear at me through the open space of the door-way; it lodged in the opposite side. I went out of the store with a pickaxe in my hand to drive him out of the yard – he retreated when he saw me, and as I supposed he was going away, I threw down the pickaxe – he ran towards it, picked it up, and was in the act of throwing it at me, upon which I ran away, he then threw the pickaxe down the well.

A few weeks later, Midgegooroo was involved in an incident that came to play a crucial part in his eventual execution. In apparent retaliation for the killing of an Aboriginal man who was taking potatoes and a fowl from the farm of Archibald Butler near Point Walter, Midgegooroo and Yagan attacked Butler's homestead and killed a servant named Erin Entwhistle, whose son Ralph, then aged about ten, gave a deposition identifying Midgegooroo as the principal offender:

They thrust spears through the wattle wall of the house – my father was ill at the time – he went out and was instantly speared. I saw the tall native called Yagan throw the first spear – which entered my father's breast, and another native Midgegooroo threw the second spear, which brought my father to the ground. I am quite sure the native now in Perth jail is the very same who threw the second spear at my father – I know him by the remarkable Bump on his forehead – and I had full time to mark him on the day of the Murder, for when my father fell, I and my brother ran into the inner room, and hid ourselves beneath the bed-stead. Midgegooroo came in and pulled all the clothes and bedding off the bed-stead, but there was a sack tied to the bottom of it, which he could not pull off, and by which we were still hid from him. I saw an old women rather tall and wanting her front teeth and who I have since been told by Midgegooroo himself is his wife, break my father's legs, and cut his head to pieces with an axe – Munday was one of the natives who attacked the house, but I did not see him throw a spear. My father had always been kind to Midgegooroo's tribe, and on good terms with them.

In May 1833, colonist Charles Bourne recalled having sat on a jury inquiring into the death of Entwhistle which heard the evidence of Ralph Entwhistle and his younger brother.

The description they gave so fully convinced the Jury that Midgegooroo was one of the principle perpetrators of the murder, that the Coroner, at their request, promised to recommend to the Government to proclaim him and the whole tribe outlaws.

Charles Bourne figured again in the story when, in about May 1832, Midgegooroo and his wife attempted to break into their house in Fremantle. "My wife told me", he recalled, "that they had thrown two spears at her, and I saw the spears laying on the floor. Their violence was such that my wife was obliged to take a sword to them." Later he was reported as having tried to take provisions from Thomas Hunt at his sawpit on the Canning River. Finally, he was reported as having set his dingos on a settler's pigs.

A police constable Thomas Hunt reported that he had known Midgegooroo for three years:

When I lived on the opposite side of the river [on the Canning River] he and his wife used frequently to visit my residence. He was always present when they attempted to plunder and acted either as the spy or the instigator. He has come to my tent door, and pointed to any provisions which might be hanging up and openly thrust in some other of his tribe to take them away. I have frequently been obliged to make a show of hostility before he would desist. He has also set two native dogs at my pigs, which they have followed to the very door of my tent. He and his tribe have repeatedly robbed me whilst I was working at a saw pit on the Canning, and on those occasions I have watched him, and distinctly observed that he acted as a spy, and gave warnings when we approached. I have heard almost every person who has known him, speak of him as a dangerous and furious ruffian.

In May 1832, Yagan was arrested for the murder of William Gaze on the Canning River, an incident that lead to his declaration as an outlaw, imprisonment on Carnac Island with Lyon, and subsequent escape. In March 1833, a number of Noongar men from King George Sound visited Perth at the instigation of the government. This was the second visit of King George Sound people that year, apparently for the purpose of encouraging "amicable relationships on the Swan like those at the Sound". (Note: See also detailed account of this episode.) Yagan and ten of his countrymen had met the first visitors at Galup and, when the next group arrived, he was keen to present a corroboree for them in Perth before an "overflowing audience", which included the Lieutenant Governor Frederick Irwin. (Note: Stirling was absent from the colony at this time, in England.) Yagan acted as "master of ceremonies, and acquitted himself with infinite dignity and grace". Although Yagan's group was referred to as "Midgegooroo's group", it is unclear whether the old man also attended.

In April 1833, an incident occurred in Fremantle that led to the declaration of Midgegooroo and Yagan as outlaws. A group of Aboriginal people, including a classificatory brother of Yagan named Domjun, broke into stores occupied by Mr. Downing. William Chidlow, who lived nearby:

perceived two or three natives in the act of breaking into the stores; he aroused some of his neighbours and each being armed, they surprized the natives in the fact [sic.], Chidlow fired and Domjum fell; the guns of the persons who accompanied Chidlow were discharged at the natives, as they fled; and there is every reason took effect, but did not prove fatal. Domjum was conveyed to the jail where he received medical attendance; the ball lodged in his head, and although the brains were exuding from the cavity, he lingered for three days before he expired.

The next morning, Yagan and a number of others crossed the Swan River near Preston Point and told Mr. Weavell's servant they were going to the Canning River to "spear 'white man', and fixing his spear into a throwing stick, he rushed into the bush, followed by his infuriated tribe". At noon, Yagan, Midgegooroo, Munday, Migo and "about 30 Natives", who "appeared to be friendly", encountered Mr. Phillips and four other white men, including Thomas and John Velvick, who were employed as farm labourers at the entrance of Bull's Creek on the Canning River. The white men were loading a quantity of provisions for Phillips' farm at Maddington, onto carts when Midgegooroo inquired about the number of men in the first cart which had already left the scene. According to a witness, Thomas Yule:

There were about thirty natives present, amongst whom I saw Yagan, Midgegooroo, Migo, and Munday. Their conduct was perfectly friendly. They appeared very anxious to know how many persons were to accompany the carts and the direction they were going. A few potatoes were given to them which they had roasted and eaten. When the carts were loaded and departed, the Natives went off in almost a parallel direction. I saw two of them pick up spears at a distance of about one hundred yards from Flaherty's stores; I separated from Mr Phillips and came on to Fremantle.

Frederick Irwin described the episode in his dispatch to the Secretary of State for Colonies:

They left the place at the same time with the carts, and in a parallel, tho' distant line. The foremost cart had proceeded four miles and was in advance of the rest a quarter of a Mile, when the Natives suddenly surrounded it and murdered with circumstances of great barbarity, the two Drivers named John and Thomas Velvick, whose cries brought up the proprietor of the Cart Mr Phillips of the Canning, who arrived in time to recognize distinctly a Native of great notoriety throughout the settlement named Yagan, while the latter was in the act of repeatedly thrusting his spear into the body of one of the deceased. The surprise appears to have been so complete that the deceased had no time to take hold of their muskets which were in the cart. The fortunate and distinct recognition of the native above mentioned by Mr Phillips, a gentleman of unquestionable character, satisfactorily identified the tribe actually committing the murder, with that of which the native shot at Fremantle was a member, and the movements of which have above been traced from Fremantle to the vicinity of the scene of the murders. The Head or leader of this tribe, an elderly man well known by the name of Midgegooroo, is father of the above-mentioned Yagan, and the native killed at Fremantle, and has long borne a bad character as the repeated perpetrator of several acts of bloodshed and robbery. He, Yagan, and another of the tribe named Munday (remarkable even during the friendly visits of his tribe to Perth for his sullen behaviour and ungovernable temper) were recognized by several credible witnesses as being present, and making the enquiries before alluded to, before the loading of the Carts at Bull's Creek.

According to his account, Irwin immediately conferred with his Executive Council "to take such steps for a prompt and summary retaliation, as the means at my disposal admitted". A proclamation was issued and published in the Perth Gazette offering a reward of £30 for the capture "dead or alive" of Yagan, and £20 of Midgigooroo and Munday, equivalent to A$4,204 and A$2,803 respectively in 2022. The proclamation declared Yagan, Midgegooroo and Munday to be outlaws;

deprived of the protection of British laws, and I do hereby authorize and command all and every His Majesty's subjects residents in any part of this colony to capture, or aid or assist in capturing the body of the said 'Egan' DEAD OR ALIVE, and to produce the said body forthwith before the nearest Justice of the Peace.

Frederick Irwin rationalized his actions to the Secretary of State in the following terms:

This pecuniary stimulus has had the hoped for effect, by bringing forward some efficient volunteers among the Settlers whose ----- and occupations have necessarily given them a more intimate knowledge of the haunts of the natives in the neighbourhood of the settled district than is possessed by the Military, but no volunteers have received permission to act unless headed by a Magistrate or a Constable. Parties of the Military have also been in constant movement, traversing the bush is such directions as reports or conjecture rendered most likely to lead to a discovery of the lurking place of the offending tribes. These parties have all received express instructions to attempt the lives of no other than the three outlaws, unless hostility on the part of others of the tribe should render it necessary in self defense. I am happy to say these measures have already been attended with considerable effect. The whole of this hostile tribe have been harassed by the constant succession of parties sent against them, and in some instances have been hotly pursued to a considerable distance in different directions.

== Capture and execution ==
By the time Irwin's dispatch had been received in London, Midgegooroo had been captured and executed. Despite his efforts to convince his superiors that his actions were justified, Irwin was criticised by the Secretary of State, who would have preferred a sentence of imprisonment, believing that execution would do little to improve relationships between the Aboriginal peoples and the colonists. As Irwin had intended, the search for Midgegooroo, Yagan and Munday proceeded quickly as the military and private settlers combed the region. One volunteer party led by a colonist named Thomas Hunt (according to Moore, "a most appropriate name" who had previously been a constable in London) headed south "in the direction of the Murray" and came across a number of "native huts" not far from the south shore of the Swan. They "routed" the Aboriginal people there, and pursued a group south, shooting and killing one man who was believed to be the brother of Midgegooroo and according to Moore, bringing his ears home "as a token". According to the Perth Gazette, throughout the period immediately after the proclamation, Midgegooroo remained near the property of the Drummonds on the Helena River "employed as he usually had been of late in taking care of the women and children of the tribe" and clearly unaware of his outlaw status and his impending doom. On Thursday 16 May, a military party led by Captain Ellis, acting on information that Midgegooroo was in the area, joined forces with a number of civilians, including Thomas Hardey and J. Hancock. After camping overnight, the next morning they came across Midgegooroo and his young son.

The old man finding a retreat impossible, became desperate; Jeffers, a private of the 63rd ... rushed forward and seized him by the hair, Captain Ellis seized his spears and broke them in his hand, he still retained the barbed ends, with which he struck at Jeffers repeatedly; the alarm he created by crying out for Yagan, and the apprehensions of his escaping, required the exercise of the greatest firmness on the part of Captain Ellis to accomplish his being brought in alive. The capture of this man as effected in a masterly manner, and redounds highly to the credit of Captain Ellis. ... Midgegooroo in his dungeon presents a most pitiable object.

In the same issue, the Perth Gazette went on to invite citizens to "forward the ends of justice" by coming forward with their evidence of Midgegooroo's wrongdoings, indicative of the close relationship between the early colonial media, the Government and the nascent system of justice. The Perth Gazette constitutes one of the principle records of the events over the next few days, and it is difficult to be definite about the chronological sequence between Midgegooroo's capture on 17 May and execution on the 22nd. It appears likely that Irwin spent the period weighing his alternatives, consulting with the Executive Council as well as men such as Moore who, as well as being a private colonist, held the official post of Commissioner of the Civil Court. On Monday 20 May, Moore records a meeting with Irwin and hints his personal view was that Midgegooroo should be transported, but there was a strong public sentiment that he should be executed;

"There is a great puzzle to know what to do with him. The populace cry loudly for his blood, but it is a hard thing to shoot him in cold blood. There is a strong intention of sending him into perpetual banishment in some out of the way place.

Irwin told the Secretary of State he had conducted a "patient examination" and had received statements from "several credible witnesses", twelve-year-old Ralph Entwhistle, John Staunton of the 63rd Regiment of Foot, Charles Bourne, constable Thomas Hunt, James Lacey, Thomas Yule (sworn before Magistrates at Fremantle) and John Ellis. Each gave brief details of Midgegooroo's alleged crimes, and identified the prisoner as the same man. Irwin reported that he gave "much anxious consideration" to Midgegooroo's punishment:

The experiment of confinement, which had been tried to some extent in the case of the three Natives whose transportation to Carnac Island and ultimate escape I have reported to your Lordship in a former dispatch appeared to have produced no good effect on the subjects of that trial, and the age of the prisoner in question apparently exceeding fifty years, forbad any sanguine hopes from such an experiment in his case.

There was no trial, even in the sense of an informal hearing. Midgegooroo was not allowed the opportunity to give evidence or defend himself and it is probable he did not understand what was being alleged. By 22 May, Irwin had made up his mind.

With the unanimous advice of the Council, I therefore decided on his execution as the only sure mode of securing the Colony from an enemy, who was doubly dangerous from his apparently implacable hostility and from his influence as an acknowledged Chief. The latter circumstance being also calculated to render his death a more striking example.

The Perth Gazette recorded the execution as follows.

In the absence of a Sheriff, the warrant was directed to the Magistrates of the District of Perth, the duty therefore devolved upon J. Morgan Esq., as Government Resident, who immediately proceeded to carry the Sentence into execution.

The death warrant was read aloud to the persons assembled, by the Resident, who immediately afterwards went inside the Jail, with the Constables and the necessary attendants, to prepare the Prisoner for his fate. Midgegooroo, on seeing that preparations were making [sic] to punish him, yelled and struggled most violently to escape. These efforts availed him little, in less than five minutes he was pinioned and blindfolded, and bound to the outer door of the Jail. The Resident then reported to his Honor the Lieutenant Governor (who was on the spot accompanied by the Members of the Council), that all was prepared, - the warrant being declared final – he turned round and gave the signal to the party of the 63d [which had volunteered] to advance and halt at 6 paces, - they then fired – and Midgegooroo fell. – The whole arrangement and execution after the death warrant had been handed over to the Civil Authorities, did not occupy half an hour.

Irwin reported simply: "He was accordingly shot, in front of the jail at Perth on the 22 Ultimo." Moore also recorded the execution although it is not clear whether he was a witness:

The native Midgegoroo, after being fully identified as being a principal in 3 murders at least, was fastened to the gaol door & fired on by a Military party, receiving 3 balls in his head, one in his body.

According to the Perth Gazette, the execution was witnessed by a

great number of persons ... although the Execution was sudden and the hour unknown. The feeling which was generally expressed was that of satisfaction at what had taken place, and in some instances loud and vehement exaltation, which the solemnity of the scene,– a fellow human being – although a native – launched into eternity – ought to have suppressed.

== Aftermath ==
It appears from the extant record that, while there was a crowd in attendance at the execution, few if any Aboriginal people were present. The boy who was captured along with Midgegooroo, who was identified as his son Billy (later referred to also as young Midgegooroo) was estimated to be between five and eight years old. He was removed,

out of sound and hearing of what was to happen to his father and has since been forwarded to the Government Schooner, Ellen, now lying off Garden Island, with particular instructions from the Magistrates to ensure him every protection and kind treatment.

Irwin informed the Secretary of State that,

the child has been kept in ignorance of his father's fate, and it is my present intention to retain him in confinement, and by kind treatment I am in hope from his tender age he may be so inured to civilized habits as to make it improbable he will revert to a barbarous life when grown up.

The Noongar population appears to have remained unaware of Midgegooroo's fate, possibly to ensure that the news would not reach the feared Yagan. Four days after the execution, Moore recorded an encounter with Yagan near his homestead when he arrived with Munday, Migo and seven others, possibly with the aim of finding out from Moore what had happened to his father. Moore, caught by surprise, decided to conceal the truth from Yagan, whereupon Yagan told him that if Midgegooroo's life was taken, he would retaliate by killing three white men. Six days later, it appears that news of the killing had still not penetrated the Noongar community for, when Moore was visited on 2 June by Weeip, Yagan's son Narral, and some women, they asked him again about Midgegooroo and his young son. (Note: Naral may more likely have been Yagan's brother.) Moore again concealed the execution but assured them that his son "would come back again by & bye". Two days later, Moore recorded that thefts of sheep and goats continued on the Canning River, and expressed his despair at the prospects for a people in whom he felt "a very great interest": "These things are very dispiriting. I fear it must come to an act of extermination between us at last if we cannot graze our flocks in safety." It was not until 11 July that the colonists succeeded in killing Yagan, his death at the hands of sixteen-year-old James Keats on the Upper Swan, who duly collected his reward and left the colony.

The Perth Gazette recorded its satisfaction at the deaths and believed that most of the citizenry supported the ruthless actions of the Government. Midgegooroo's execution, it claimed, met with "general satisfaction … his name has long rung in our ears, associated with every enormity committed by the natives; we therefore join cordially in commending this prompt and decisive measure". On the other hand, it is clear that a number of colonists were unhappy with the actions of the government. Robert Lyon, who published his account of the period in 1839 after he had left the colony, wrote that while the killing of Midgegooroo and Yagan was "applauded by a certain class", they were "far from being universally approved. Many were silent, but some of the most respectable of the settlers loudly expressed their disapprobation." There was criticism also from other Australian colonies about the execution of Midgegooroo. The Hobart Town Review of 20 August 1833 was full of vitriol for Irwin's actions:

It is hard to conceive any offence on the part of the poor unfortunate wretch that could justify the putting him to death, even in the open field, but to slay him in cool blood to us appears a cruel murder without palliation.

Irwin, however, was convinced that his actions were merited. Writing in England about two years after the events of 1833, he asserted that,

these acts of justice so completely succeeded in their object of intimidating the natives on the Swan and Canning Rivers that recent accounts from the colony represent the shepherds and others in the habit of going about the country, as having for a considerable laid aside their usual precaution of carrying firearms, so peaceable had the conduct of those tribes become.

Shortly after the death of Yagan, the Perth Gazette expressed hope that the Aboriginal people of the Swan and Canning Rivers would stop harassing colonists. At the same time, the way in which Yagan met his death was "revolting to our feelings to hear this lauded as a meritorious deed". "What a fearful lesson of instruction have we given the savage!" the newspaper lamented. Munday approached the Lieutenant Governor seeking to make peace, and his outlaw status was annulled. Remarking on the apparent desire of Aboriginal visitors to the Perth town area to "renew the friendly understanding", the newspaper nevertheless warned that

they ought [...] never to be out of the sight of some authorized persons, who should have the power of controlling the conduct of individuals towards them, at the same time as they protect the public from any aggression on the part of the natives.

Early in September 1833, Munday and Migo were taken by a young colonist named Francis Armstrong, later to be appointed to manage a ration depot at Mount Eliza, to meet the Lieutenant Governor. With Armstrong acting as interpreter, Migo and Munday told the Lieutenant Governor that they,

wished to come to an amicable treaty with us, and were desirous to know whether the white people would shoot any more of their black people. Being assured that they would not, they proceeded to give the names of all the black men of the tribes in this immediate neighbourhood who had been killed with a description of where they were shot and the persons who had shot them. The number amounted to sixteen, killed, and nearly twice as many wounded; indeed it is supposed that few have escaped uninjured. The accuracy with which they mark out the persons who have been implicated in these attacks, should serve as a caution to the public in regulating their conduct towards them. ... After all the names of the dead were given, they intimated that they were still afraid that, before long, more would be added to the number, but being assured again that it would not be the case, unless they "quippled", committed theft, they said then no more white men would be speared. They seemed perfectly aware that it was our intention to shoot them if they "quippled"; they argued however that it was opposed to their laws, - which as banishment from the tribe, or spearing through the leg. The death of Domjun at Fremantle, who was shot in the act of carrying away a bag of flour, they say was not merited, that the punishment was too severe for the offence; and further, that it was wrong to endanger the lives of others for the act of one, - two of his companions having been severely wounded. They say that only one life would have been taken for this occurrence, had they not met with the Velvicks at the Canning, who had previously behaved ill towards them: the attempt which was made at the Canning to break their spears, it seems, increased their irritation.

Migo and Munday went on to describe the arrest of Midgegooroo:

They were not far off, and heard his cries; the party who took him were all known to them, and they followed them to within a very short distance of Perth; they evince some anxiety now to be made acquainted with the names of the soldiers who shot him, and still continue their enquiries about the son; both of which questions it is prudent to avoid answering, notwithstanding their proffered amnesty. Midgegooroo's wives, when they had ascertained that he was captured, scratched and disfigured themselves - a usual practice among them - and when his death was fully ascertained, Yellagonga and Dommera fought a duel for the one, and Munday took the other.

The Lieutenant Governor proposed that a meeting of all the Swan and Canning people should be held, but Munday and Migo told him this would have to wait until the "yellow season", December, January and February when the banksias flowered. After the meeting, Migo and Munday were seen "in earnest conversation with members of their tribe, communicating, it was supposed, the results of the interview". A day later, the newspaper reported that a large "corrobara" was held in Perth, but that it had been interrupted by "some blackguards throwing a bucket of water over them". It also reported that a few days previously, a white woman had taken some wood,

from under a tree, which it had occupied Munday some time to cut. As it was not intended for her, he called to her to put it down, she however persisted in carrying it off, he threw his saw down and was soon on the ground after her. He appeared terribly enraged; the female gave him some bread and he was pacified. The town would have been up in arms if Munday had speared the female, but there can be no question that she as richly deserved punishment as Domjum merited his fate.

Thus, the Aboriginal people of the Swan and Canning were able for the first time to put their story before the government, and even the Gazette, which had been unrelenting in its calls for harsh punishment, conceded that they might have a point and that justice, as allotted in the Swan River Colony, was at best inconsistent. Munday and Migo argued their people had been extremely badly treated. Even in the context of the early nineteenth century, death was an extreme penalty for the theft of flour and biscuits. Their people had consistently been poorly treated, but their story had been left untold. The treatment at the hands of people such as the Velvicks had been left out of the discourse of "native barbarity", and the dispositions about the role of Midgegooroo, Yagan and Munday in their deaths failed to mention that, on that day at Bull's Creek, the colonists had tried to seize and break their spears.

The colonial government and the colonists of Perth, however, had no intention of sharing their new possessions with the Aboriginal people, who were henceforth to be dependent on government rations dispensed from ration points. Thus began the long and inexorable history of the dispossession of Western Australian Aboriginal people from their lands and the loss of their freedoms of movement. In Perth, the ruthless killing of Midgegooroo and Yagan shocked the people of the Swan and Canning but, far from improving relationships between coloniser and colonised, violence and robbery continued for some years in the region and further afield. (Note: There are a large number of references to support these statements in addition to the works of Green and Carter. These include Biskup (1973), Bropho (1986), Gribble (1987), Haebich (1988), Hawke and Gallagher (1989), Pedersen and Woorenmurra (1995), Reynolds (1998), Jebb (2002), and Auty (2005).) Aboriginal people of the Murray River felt the full force of colonial fury just over a year after Munday and Migo had expressed their desire for a treaty, when a large number of their people were massacred in a combined action near Pinjarra in October 1834. As the Western Australian frontier spread over the vast land area of the colony, other Aboriginal people were to experience much the same pattern of dispossession, death, incarceration and government repression.

Midgegooroo's land rights passed to his son Yagan, then to his other son Narral. Munday assumed responsibility for his older wife, and his younger wife Ganiup became the wife of a Noongar named Dommera.

== Legacy ==
By June 2008, the Department of Environment and Conservation, Conservation Commission and the Geographic Names Committee approved the renaming of the Canning National Park to Midgegooroo National Park.

== See also ==
- Aboriginal history of Western Australia

== Sources ==
- Adams, Simon (2009). The Unforgiving Rope: Murder and Hanging on Australia's Western Frontier. Nedlands: UWA Publishing. ISBN 9781921401220. OCLC 277161455.
- Cameron, J.M.R., ed. (2006). The Millendon Memoirs: George Fletcher Moore's Western Australian Diaries and Letters, 1830 – 1841. Perth: Hesperian Press. ISBN 0-85905-388-1.
- Carter, Bevan; Nutter, Lynda (2006). Nyungah Land: Records of the invasion and theft of Aboriginal Land on the Swan River, 1829 – 1850. Black History Series. Perth: Swan Valley Nyungah Community. ISBN 0-9579-9801-5. OCLC 75088182.
- Evans, Julie (June 2009). "Where Lawlessness is Law: The Settler-Colonial Frontier as a Legal Space of Violence" (PDF). The Australian Feminist Law Journal. 30 (1). Nathan, Queensland: Taylor & Francis: 3–22. ISSN 1320-0968.
- Stannage, Charles Thomas, ed. (1981). "Aborigines and White Settlers in the Nineteenth Century". A New History of Western Australia. Nedlands: UWA Publishing. ISBN 0-85564-181-9. LCCN 82101009. OCLC 963830667. OL 3517729M. Wikidata Q125995168.
- Green, Neville James (1984). Broken Spears: Aboriginals and Europeans in the southwest of Australia. Cottesloe: Focus Education Services. ISBN 0-9591828-1-0. LCCN 85194823. OCLC 1285471045. OL 2625980M. Wikidata Q136385324.
- Green, Neville James (1995). Broken Spears: Aboriginals and Europeans in the southwest of Australia. Cottesloe: Focus Education Services. OL 24339154M. Wikidata Q136385520.
- Hallam, Sylvia J.; Tilbrook, Lois (1990). Aboriginals of the Southwest Region, 1829–1840. The Bicentennial Dictionary of Western Australians. Vol. 8. Nedlands: University of Western Australia Press. ISBN 0-85564-296-3.
- Irwin, Frederick Chidley (1 June 1833). "Dispatch from F.C. Irwin to Secretary of State for Colonies". Australian Joint Microfilm Project.
- Irwin, Frederick (1835). The State and Position of Western Australia; commonly called the Swan-River Settlement. London: Simpkin, Marshall, and Co. LCCN 49038037. OCLC 992278984. Wikidata Q16325541.
- "Yagan". Kaartdijin Noongar. South West Aboriginal Land & Sea Council. 2025.
- "Stolen Generations". Kaartdijin Noongar. South West Aboriginal Land & Sea Council. 2025.
- Lyon, Menli Lyon (1839). An Appeal to the World on behalf of the younger Branch of the Family of Shem . Sydney: J. Spilsbury and J. M'Rachern – via Wikisource.
- Mitchell, Samille (2008). Verboon, Kaye; Mitchell, Samille; King, Rhianna; Thomson-Dans, Carolyn (eds.). "What is in a name?" (PDF). Parks of the Darling Range. 24 (2, Summer 2008–09). Kensington: Department of Biodiversity, Conservation and Attractions, Government of Western Australia: 42–46. ISSN 0815-4465. "Midgegooroo's family had customary land-usage rights over a large area of what is now southern metropolitan Perth."
- Perth Gazette and Western Australian Journal, The (23 March 1833). "Page 45". The Perth Gazette and Western Australian Journal. Vol. 1, no. 12. Western Australia. pp. 45–48 – via National Library of Australia.
- Perth Gazette and Western Australian Journal, The (13 April 1833). "Page 57". The Perth Gazette and Western Australian Journal. Vol. 1, no. 15. Western Australia. pp. 57–60 – via National Library of Australia.
- Perth Gazette and Western Australian Journal, The (4 May 1833). "Page 69". The Perth Gazette and Western Australian Journal. Vol. 1, no. 18. Western Australia. pp. 69–72 – via National Library of Australia.
- Perth Gazette and Western Australian Journal, The (16 May 1833). "n.t.". The Perth Gazette and Western Australian Journal. Vol. 1. Western Australia.
- "The Natives Again!: Pursuit of the Natives". The Perth Gazette and Western Australian Journal. Vol. I, no. 20. Western Australia. 18 May 1833. pp. 77–78 – via National Library of Australia.
- Perth Gazette and Western Australian Journal, The (25 May 1833). "Page 81". The Perth Gazette and Western Australian Journal. Vol. 1, no. 21. Western Australia. pp. 81–84 – via National Library of Australia.
- Perth Gazette and Western Australian Journal, The (20 July 1833). "Page 113". The Perth Gazette and Western Australian Journal. Vol. 1, no. 29. Western Australia. pp. 113–116 – via National Library of Australia.
- Perth Gazette and Western Australian Journal, The (27 July 1833). "Page 117". The Perth Gazette and Western Australian Journal. Vol. 1, no. 30. Western Australia. pp. 117–120 – via National Library of Australia.
- Perth Gazette and Western Australian Journal, The (10 August 1833). "The Natives". The Perth Gazette and Western Australian Journal. Vol. 1, no. 32. Western Australia. p. 126 – via National Library of Australia.
- Perth Gazette and Western Australian Journal, The (7 September 1833). "Page 141". The Perth Gazette and Western Australian Journal. Vol. 1, no. 36. Western Australia. pp. 141–144 – via National Library of Australia.
- Perth Gazette and Western Australian Journal, The (25 May 1833). "The Western Australian Journal". The Perth Gazette and Western Australian Journal. Vol. 1, no. 21. Western Australia. p. 83 – via National Library of Australia.
- Perth Gazette and Western Australian Journal, The (25 May 1833). "Depositions". The Perth Gazette and Western Australian Journal. Vol. 1, no. 21. Western Australia. p. 83 – via National Library of Australia.
- Perth Gazette and Western Australian Journal, The (25 May 1833). "Execution". The Perth Gazette and Western Australian Journal. Vol. 1, no. 21. Western Australia. pp. 83–84 – via National Library of Australia.
- Shellam, Tiffany (2009). Shaking Hands on the Fringe. Nedlands: UWA Publishing. ISBN 9781921401268.
- Statham, Pamela (2003). James Stirling: Admiral and Founding Governor of Western Australia. Crawley: UWA Publishing. ISBN 978-1-876268-94-7. LCCN 2003464253. OL 3760974M. Wikidata Q136431983.

== General references ==
- Moore, George Fletcher (1884). "The colony (7)" . Diary of Ten Years Eventful Life of an Early Settler in Western Australia . London: M. Walbrook. p. 206 . LCCN 43042806. OCLC 5343980. OL 7030461M – via Wikisource. [scan ]
- Moore, George Fletcher (1884). Diary of Ten Years Eventful Life of an Early Settler in Western Australia. London: M. Walbrook. LCCN 43042806. OCLC 5343980. OL 7030461M. Wikidata Q19081637.
