= Perth Prohibited Area =

Restricted area in Perth, Western Australia

Coordinates: 31.954899°S 115.860493°E

The Perth Prohibited Area was an area of the metropolitan area in Perth, Western Australia that Aboriginal people were not permitted to enter without a permit. The prohibition was in force from 1927 to 1954, and covered approximately 13 square kilometres (5 sq mi) wholly within the boundaries of the City of Perth. The ban was instigated by A. O. Neville, the protector of Aborigines, and proclaimed under the Aborigines Act 1905 (WA) in 1927. (Note: Area not depicted on later version of map.)

Aboriginal people working in the city had to leave by 6 pm or face the threat of arrest and a fine, or in some cases a custodial sentence. The edict was actively enforced, with the records of the Central Police Office showing 78 Indigenous people charged from July 1949 to February 1950. The historian Stephen Kinnane has suggested that Neville did not like the fact that Aboriginals were beating white Australians at competitive events held in White City.

== See also ==
- Aboriginal history of Western Australia
- Sundown town, the American equivalent
- Coolbaroo League
