= Westralian Aborigine =

Australian Aboriginal newspaper

The Westralian Aborigine (also known as Westralian Aboriginie) was an independently run and managed Aboriginal newspaper in Western Australia.

The newspaper was established in early December 1953, with a monthly publication beginning January 1954 that ran until July 1957; the initial distribution was of 600 copies.

The newspaper was managed and run by the Coolabaroo League. It was one of the few Aboriginal-run newspapers in Australia.
