= Weeip =

Aboriginal Australian leader in 1830s Western Australia

Weeip was an Aboriginal Australian leader of the Boora clan (Boya Ngura people) of the Whadjuk Noongar people in the 1830s, during the early years of the Swan River Colony in Western Australia.

His territory extended from the Helena River and upper reaches of the Swan River (modern day Guildford) to the Darling Scarp.

In 1834 Weeip negotiated a truce with Governor James Stirling to improve relations between the Boora and the British settlers, around the time of the Pinjarra massacre. The negotiations took place while Weeip's younger son Billyoomerri was held in prison. Billyoomerri was released after the truce was agreed.

In December 2019, the City of Swan named the open public space in the Midland New Junction precinct after him, Weeip Park. The park opened was in November 2020.
