= Wage theft from Indigenous Australians =

Wage theft from Indigenous Australians was a frequent occurrence in Australia from the late 19th century through to the late 20th century. It was particularly prevalent on pastoral leases.

Under the system of Aboriginal Protection Boards established by state and federal legislation, Indigenous Australian workers' wages were paid into government-owned trust accounts. Their access to the bank accounts was severely restricted and in some cases governments illegally expropriated the trust funds for other purposes. Additionally, employers frequently underpaid Indigenous workers or made illegal withholdings.

In the early 21st century several class action lawsuits were instituted by Indigenous workers, leading to the establishment of compensation schemes by state and territory governments.

== Inquiries ==
In 2006 a parliamentary inquiry tried to find out how much in wages had been withheld from Indigenous workers across Australia, but found the practice was so extensive that it could not reach a figure. Known officially as the Senate Legal and Constitutional References Committee Inquiry into Stolen Wages, the Human Rights and Equal Opportunity Commission made a submission to it. The Inquiry recommended that state governments must open their archives to improve access, fund awareness campaigns, and provide legal assistance to potential claimants. Stolen wages commissions were set up in Western Australia (March–November 2012), Queensland (2015), and New South Wales (2004–2011).

Political campaigns led by trade unions and community groups have been advocating strongly for reparations, particularly in Queensland and New South Wales, and somewhat less strongly in Western Australia and Victoria, but there has been much research conducted on the topic of stolen wages in Victoria. The Wampan Wages Victorian Stolen Wages Working Group has been the peak body in that state. As of 2014, there was still no reparation scheme in Victoria.

Recent estimates have suggested that up to A$500 million may have been withheld in just Queensland from 1920 to 1970.

== Lawsuits and compensation schemes ==
=== Northern Territory ===
As of September 2021 more than 770 former stockmen, farmhands, domestic workers and labourers in the Northern Territory have joined in a class action to recover stolen wages, as well as other forms of reparations, such as truth telling. A date has been set for the class action trial, in March 2025.

=== Queensland ===
In 2015 the Stolen Wages Reparations Task Force was established by the Queensland Government to provide advice and recommendations relating to "The Reparations Scheme –Stolen Wages and Savings", which was due to conclude in 2018. Mick Gooda was appointed as chair.

In September 2016 a class action was started by eighty-year-old Hans Pearson, in the Federal Court of Australia against the Queensland Government. Known as “The Stolen Wages Class Action”, the case was known as Pearson v State of Queensland. It concerns payment for work done from 1939 to 1972 by Aboriginal and Torres Strait Islander people in Queensland. It represented about 10,000 Aboriginal Queenslanders, of whom about 60 percent were already deceased, and was settled in July 2019 with a payout of A$190,000,000. This was the fifth-largest class action settlement in Australia, aside from native title claims, the biggest ever payout to Indigenous Australians.

The lawsuit claimed that the legislation in force from 1939 to 1972 allowed the wages of Aboriginal and Torres Strait Islander workers to be stolen. The payout represented wages that had been withheld by the state government, which often deposited it into trust funds inaccessible to Indigenous people, which was enabled under the legislation described above. This settlement, based on the legal claim that the government "breached its duty as a trustee and fiduciary in not paying out wages that were held in trust", and based on archived records, was the first recognition that claims for stolen wages have some legal and ethical justification. Previous actions by claimants in Western Australia, New South Wales and Queensland had not been successful.

The payout was reduced by about A$53 million in the costs of litigation. Because of the lack of records, the court relied on anthropological evidence to determine the entitlements, grouping people based on age; it was not intended to be a precise calculation of what was owed because this was impossible to determine. Moneys were not paid out to grandchildren, and men received more than women as it was calculated that more was withheld from them.

However, the legal justification under which this settlement was awarded does not necessarily apply across all sectors and jurisdictions; different issues arise where private employers are involved. Historically, the majority of Aboriginal workers were employed on cattle stations across northern Australia, from Queensland, across the Northern Territory to Western Australia, numbering tens of thousands between the 1880s and 1970s. Indigenous labour kept the industry afloat during the Great Depression in Australia. The law allowed wages of two-thirds that of non-Indigenous workers, but employers could get away with paying less, and unlike Queensland government archives, few records of these transactions exist.

=== Western Australia ===
In October 2020 a class action was started against the Western Australian Government, with more than a thousand people registered for the claim. In November 2023 the WA Government agreed a settlement with Shine Lawyers, acting for the claimants. According to an announcement on the government website: "The WA Government will pay into an administered fund a sum of $16,500 in respect of each eligible claimant, up to a total of $165 million". The maximum total will only be paid if the number of eligible claimants reaches 10,000. The Federal Court will determine how much each claimant will receive.

== See also ==
- Slavery in Australia
