= List of Noongar people =

The following is a list of notable Aboriginal Australian people of Noongar identity, from the south-west corner of Western Australia.

== Academics ==
- Hannah McGlade
- Leonard Collard
- Elfie Shiosaki

== Activists ==
- George Abdullah
- Corina Abraham
- Fanny Balbuk
- Robert Bropho
- Bessie Flower
- William Harris (civil rights leader)
- Clarrie Isaacs

== Actors ==
- Shareena Clanton
- Kylie Farmer
- Kelton Pell
- Tuuli Narkle

== Artists ==
- Revel Cooper
- Sharyn Egan
- Ken Farmer
- Laurel Nannup
- Shane Pickett
- Tjyllyungoo

== Authors ==
- Charmaine Bennell
- Eddie Bennell
- Claire G. Coleman
- Glenys Collard
- Jack Davis (playwright)
- Graeme Dixon (poet)
- Dallas Winmar
- Kim Scott
- Archie Weller

== Elders ==
- Ken Colbung
- Leonard Collard
- Midgegooroo
- Ben Cuimermara Taylor
- Angus Wallam

== Musicians ==
- Della Rae Morrison
- Gina Williams
- Dallas Woods

== Politicians ==
- Dorinda Cox
- Carol Martin (politician)
- Ken Wyatt

== Religious figures ==
- Veronica Willaway
- Mohammed Junaid Thorne

== Resistance fighters ==
- Calyute
- Yagan

== Scientists ==
- Sandra Eades

== Sportspeople ==
- Harley Bennell
- Shai Bolton
- Barry Cable
- Cyril Collard
- Shannon Cox
- Graham Farmer
- Jeff Farmer
- Lance Franklin
- Jonathon Griffin
- Roger Hayden
- Andrew Krakouer
- Nathan Krakouer
- Phil Krakouer
- Jimmy Krakouer
- Peter Matera
- Marlion Pickett
- Paddy Ryder
- Donnell Wallam
- Lydia Williams
- Nicky Winmar
- Alex Winwood
- Shane Yarran
- Chris Yarran

== Other ==
- Brooke Blurton
- Karla Hart
- Mokare
- Angela Ryder
- Cassius Turvey
- Yellagonga
