= Noongar language =

Southwestern Australian Aboriginal language

Noongar
- Nyungar
- Native to: Australia
- Region: Western Australia
- Ethnicity: Noongar (Amangu, Ballardong, Yued, Kaneang, Koreng, Mineng, Njakinjaki, Njunga, Pibelmen, Pindjarup, Wardandi, Whadjuk, Wiilman, Wudjari)
- Native speakers: <240 (2014)
- Language family: Pama–Nyungan: Nyungic; Noongar
- Dialects: Wudjari (Kwetjman); Mineng (Minang); Bibbulman (Pipelman); Kaniyang (Kaneang); Wardandi; Balardung (incl. Tjapanmay?); Yuat (Juat); Wiilman; Whadjuk; ?Pinjarup
- Writing system: Latin

Language codes
- ISO 639-3: nys – inclusive code Individual codes: xgg – Koreng (Goreng) xrg – Mineng (Minang) xbp – Bibbulman (Pipelman) wxw – Wardandi pnj – Pinjarup xwj – Whadjuk (Wajuk)
- Linguist List: qsz Juat (Yuat)
- Glottolog: nyun1247
- AIATSIS: W41
- The Noongar language subgroup, and its individual varieties, before contact with Europeans References

Noongar (/ˈnʊŋɑːr/), also Nyungar (/ˈnjʊŋɡɑːr/ (Note: ISO 639-3 uses Nyungar, changed from Nyunga in 2019 with the rationale "Australian government used and currently published name".)), is an Australian Aboriginal language or dialect continuum, spoken by some members of the Noongar community and others. It is taught actively in Australia, including at schools, universities and through public broadcasting. The country of the Noongar people is the southwest corner of Western Australia. Within that region, many Noongar words have been adopted into Australian English, particularly names of plants and animals.

Noongar was first recorded in 1801 by Matthew Flinders, who made a number of word lists.

== Varieties ==
Map of Perth showing Noongar names for places where recorded in the OpenStreetMap project, and English names where they are not. Names recorded for features such as Swan River, Perth Oval and Galup are not shown in this map. As of March 2025, there are 103 instances of the 'name:nys' tag used to record Noongar names in OpenStreetMap.

It is generally agreed that there was no single, standard Noongar (or Nyungar) language before European settlement: it was a subgroup (or possibly a dialect continuum) of closely related languages, whose speakers were differentiated geographically and, in some cases, by cultural practices. The dialects merged into the modern Noongar language following colonisation. A 1990 conference organised by the Nyoongar Language Project Advisory Panel recognised that the Noongar subgroup included at least three distinct languages. This was highlighted by the 2011 Noongar Dictionary, edited by Bernard Rooney, which was based on the Yuat (Juat) variety, from the northwest part of the Noongar subgroup area.

The highlighted area of the map shown here may correspond to the Noongar subgroup. The subdivisions shown correspond to individual varieties. In modern Noongar, these varieties have merged. There is controversy in some cases as to whether all of these varieties were part of the original Noongar subgroup. Some may have been distinct languages and some may have belonged to neighbouring subgroups.

Many linguists believe that the northernmost language shown, Amangu, was not part of the Noongar subgroup, was instead a part of the Kartu subgroup, and may have been a dialect of the Kartu language Nhanda. (As such, Amangu may have been synonymous with a dialect known as Nhanhagardi, which has also been classified, at different times, as a part of Nhanda, Noongar, or Widi.)

There is a general consensus that the following varieties belong to the Noongar subgroup: Wudjari, Minang, Bibelman (a.k.a. Pibelman; Bibbulman), (Note: Spelling may vary, especially in the case of "Bilelman" and "Nadji Nadji", which are apparent errors for Bibbulman and Njakinjaki.) Kaneang (Kaniyang), Wardandi, Balardung (a.k.a. Ballardong; which probably included Tjapanmay/Djabanmai), and Yuat (Juat). Wiilman, Whadjuk (Wajuk) and Pinjarup are also usually regarded as dialects of Noongar, although this identification is not completely secure. The Koreng (Goreng) people are thought to have spoken a dialect of, or closely related to, Wudjari, in which case their language would have been part of the Noongar subgroup. Njakinjaki (Nyakinyaki) was possibly a dialect of Kalaamaya – a language related to, but separate from, the original Noongar subgroup. It is not clear if the Njunga (or Nunga) dialect was significantly different from Wudjari. However, according to Norman Tindale, the Njunga people rejected the name Wudjari and had adopted some of the customs of their non-Noongar-speaking eastern neighbours, the Ngadjunmaya.

== Documentation ==
The Noongar names for birds were included in Serventy and Whittell's Birds of Western Australia (1948), noting their regional variations. A later review and synthesis of recorded names and consultation with Noongars produced a list of recommended orthography and pronunciation for birds (2009) occurring in the region. The author, Ian Abbott, also published these recommendations for plants (1983) and mammals (2001), and proposed that these replace other vernacular in common use.

A number of small wordlists were recorded in the early days of the Swan River Colony, for example Robert Menli Lyon's 1833 publication A Glance at the Manners and Language of Aboriginal Inhabitants of Western Australia. Lyon acquired much of his information from Yagan while Yagan was incarcerated on Carnac Island. Despite the significance of Lyon's work in being the first of its kind, George Fletcher Moore described Lyon's work as "containing many inaccuracies and much that was fanciful".

During August and October 1839 the Perth Gazette published Vocabulary of the Aboriginal people of Western Australia, written by Lieutenant Grey of HM 83rd Regiment. Grey spent twelve months studying the languages of the Noongar people and came to the conclusion that there was much in common between them. Just prior to publication, he received from Mr Bussel of the Busselton district a list of 320 words from that region which was near identical to those he had collected in the Swan River region. Much to Grey's disappointment, his work was published in an unfinished list as he was leaving the colony, but he believed that the publication would assist in communication between settlers and Noongar people. Also noted by Grey was that the Noongar language had no soft ⟨c⟩ sound, there was no use of ⟨f⟩ and that ⟨h⟩ was very rarely used and never at the start of a word.

Serious documentation of the Noongar language began in 1842 with the publication of A Descriptive Vocabulary of the Language in Common Use Amongst the Aborigines of Western Australia by George Fletcher Moore, later republished in 1884 as part of Moore's diary. This work included a substantial wordlist of Noongar. The first modern linguistic research on Noongar was carried out by Gerhardt Laves on the variety known as Koreng, near Albany in 1930, but this material was lost for many years and has only recently been recovered. Beginning in the 1930s and then more intensively in the 1960s Wilfrid Douglas learnt and studied Noongar, eventually producing a grammar, dictionary, and other materials.

More recently, Noongar people have taken a major role in this work as researchers, for example Rose Whitehurst who compiled the Noongar Dictionary in her work for the Noongar Language and Culture Centre. In 2012 Tim McCabe finished a PhD on Noongar place names, songs and stories, having been taught a variety of the language by Clive Humphreys of Kellerberrin, and is teaching Noongar to inmates in Perth prisons.

Peter Bindon and Ross Chadwick have compiled an authoritative cross referenced "A Nyoongar Wordlist: from the South West of Western Australia", by assembling material from all of the above writers in their original spelling. It is clear from this reference that the orthographies used reflected not only dialectical differences, but also how the various authors "heard" and transcribed spoken Noongar.

== Current situation ==
=== Neo-Nyungar ===
Neo-Nyungar
- Region: SW Australia
- Native speakers: 443 (2016 census)
- Language family: Indo-European: Germanic; West Germanic; Anglic; English; Australian English; Neo-Nyungar

Language codes
- ISO 639-3: –
- Linguist List: eng-neo
- Glottolog: None

An English dialect with Noongar admixture, known as Neo-Nyungar, is the community dialect of the Nyungar people.

=== Number of speakers ===
On the 2016 census, 443 people identified themselves as speaking Noongar at home.

Since the late 20th century, there has been increased interest in reviving the Noongar/Nyungar language, including teaching it at many schools throughout the south west of Western Australia. As of 2022 it is one of the 24 Aboriginal languages being taught at 68 schools in Western Australia to around 10,000 students. Curtin University offers an open online Noongar language and culture course.

=== Noongar Language Centre ===
The Noongar Language and Culture Centre was set up at the Bunbury Aboriginal Progress Association in 1986, and grew to include offices in Northam and Perth. Authors such as Charmaine Bennell have released several books in the language. Educators Glenys Collard and Rose Whitehurst started recording elders speaking using Noongar language in 1990.

In 1997 at a meeting of around 200 Noongar people at Marribank, a standard orthography was agreed on for teaching the language in schools. A unanimous vote decided that the language would be spelt "Nyoongar", but later, as teaching and learning resources were being developed for the Languages Other Than English (LOTE) curriculum which would be taught in schools, it was decided to change to "Noongar".

By 2010, 37 schools in the South West and Perth were teaching the language.

In 2014, the Noongar Boodjar Language Cultural Aboriginal Corporation (NBLCAC) was incorporated, and the Commonwealth Government provided funding for four years from 2015 under the Indigenous Languages Support program to establish the Noongar Language Centre. The offices are located in Cannington.

=== Noongarpedia ===
"Djena djen", performed by Noongarpedia mob, written by Wirlomin Noongar Language and Stories Project

In 2015 Professor Len Collard from the School of Indigenous Studies at the University of Western Australia challenged the science behind the claim that it is an endangered language, citing the lack of rigour in the data. Collard began leading a project to create the "Noongarpedia", recording the language in a wiki format, allowing for expansion over time. The project is continuing as of April 2021, with the site growing in the Wikimedia Incubator. It is the first Wikipedia in an Aboriginal Australian language site, but it is intended to be bilingual, so as to be used as a teaching aid in schools.

=== Language through the arts ===
Singer-songwriter Gina Williams has promoted the use of the language through song, including lullabies for children and a translation of the song "Moon River".

An adaption and translation of the Shakespearean tragedy Macbeth into Noongar was performed at the 2020 Perth Festival. The play, named Hecate, is produced by Yirra Yaakin Theatre Company with Bell Shakespeare, and performed by an all-Noongar cast. The play took years to translate, and has sparked wider interest in reviving the language.

In July 2022, rock band King Gizzard & the Lizard Wizard released a special edition of their album Butterfly 3000 with all its 10 songs translated into Noongar by Merinda Hansen and Lois Spehn-Jackson; all proceedings of this edition are donated to the Langford Aboriginal Association.

=== Mobile apps ===
Several mobile apps have been created that use Noongar language, both written and spoken. These include a plant identification app, dictionary, and cultural information.

== Phonology ==
The following are the sounds in the Noongar language:

=== Vowels ===
	Front	Central	Back
High	i		u
Mid	e		o
Low		a	

=== Consonants ===
	Peripheral		Laminal	Apical	
	Labial	Velar	Palatal	Alveolar	Retroflex
Plosive	b/p	ɡ/k	ɟ/c	d/t	ɖ/ʈ
Nasal	m	ŋ	ɲ	n	ɳ
Lateral			ʎ	l	ɭ
Rhotic				r	
Approximant	w		j		ɻ

/r/ can be heard as either [r, ɾ] or a glide [ɹ].

== Pronunciation ==
Basic counting 1 through to 10 plus twenty

Letter	IPA and English sound	Nyunga sound
B	/b/; "book"	boodjar (country)
D	/d/; "dog"	darbal (estuary)
DJ or TJ	/ɟ/; similar to "jewish"	djen (foot) or nortj (death)
NY	/ɲ/; "canyon"	nyungar
NG	/ŋ/; "sing"	ngow (malleefowl)

== Grammar ==
Noongar grammar is fairly typical of Pama–Nyungan languages in that it is agglutinating, with words and phrases formed by the addition of affixes to verb and noun stems. Word order in Noongar is free, but generally tends to follow a subject–object–verb pattern. Because there are several varieties of Noongar, aspects of grammar, syntax and orthography are highly regionally variable.

=== Verbs ===
Like most Australian languages, Noongar has a complex tense and aspect system. The plain verb stem functions as both the infinitive and the present tense. Verb phrases are formed by adding suffixes or adverbs to the verb stem.

The following adverbs are used to indicate grammatical tense or aspect.

- boorda later (boorda ngaarn, "will eat later")
- mila future (mila ngaarn, "will eat after a while")
- doora conditional (doora ngaarn, "should eat")

Some tense/aspect distinctions are indicated by use of a verb suffix. In Noongar, the past or preterite tense is the same as the past participle.

- -iny progressive (ngaarniny, "eating")
- -ga past (ngaarnga, "ate, had eaten")

A few adverbs are used with the past tense to indicate the amount of time since the event of the verb took place.

- gorah a long time (gorah gaarnga, "ate a long time ago")
- karamb a short time (karamb ngaarnga, "ate a little while ago")
- gori just now (gori ngaarnga, "just ate")

=== Nouns ===
There are no articles in Noongar.

Nouns (as well as adjectives) take a variety of suffixes which indicate grammatical case, specifically relating to motion or direction, among other distinctions.

-(a)k	locative	boorn-ak, "in the tree"
-(a)k	purposive	daatj-ak, "for meat"
-(a)l	instrumental	kitj-al, "by means of a spear"
-an/ang	genitive	noon-an kabarli, "your grandmother"
-(a)p	place-of	boorn-ap, "place of trees"
-koorl	illative	keba-koorl, "towards the water"
-ool	ablative	kep-ool, "away from the water"
-ngat	adessive	keba-ngat, "near the water"
-(a)biny	translative	moorditj-abiny, "becoming strong"
-mokiny	semblative	dwert-mokiny, "like a dog"
-boorong	having or existing	moorn-boorong, "getting dark"
-broo	abessive	bwoka-broo, "without a coat"
-kadak	comitative	mereny-kadak, "with food"
-mit	used-for	kitjal baal daatj-mit barangin'y, "a spear is used for hunting kangaroos"
-koop	belong-to, inhabitant of	bilya-koop, "river dweller"
-djil	emphatic	kwaba-djil, "very good"
-mart	species or family	bwardong-mart, "crow species"
-(i)l	agentive suffix used with ergative	

Colours spelt both in Noongar and English

The direct object of a sentence (what might be called the dative) can also be expressed with the locative suffix -ak.

Grammatical number is likewise expressed by the addition of suffixes. Nouns that end in vowels take the plural suffix -man, whereas nouns that end in consonants take -gar. Inanimate nouns, that is, nouns that do not denote human beings, can also be pluralized by the simple addition of a numeral.

=== Pronouns ===
Noongar pronouns are declined exactly as nouns, taking the same endings. Thus, possessive pronouns are formed by the addition of the regular genitive suffix -ang. Conversely, object pronouns are formed by the addition of the -any suffix. Notably, there does not appear to be a great deal of pronominal variation across dialectal lines.

	Subject	Object	Possessive
I	ngany	nganyany	nganyang
he/she/it	baal	baalany	baalang
they	baalap	baalabany	baalabang
you	noonook	noonany	noonang
we	ngalak	ngalany	ngalang

Noongar features a set of dual number pronouns which identify interpersonal relationships based on kinship or marriage. The "fraternal" dual pronouns are used by and for people who are siblings or close friends, "paternal" dual pronouns are used by and for people who are paternal relatives (parent-child, uncle-niece and so forth), and "marital" pronouns are used by and for people who are married to each other or are in-laws.

	Fraternal	Paternal	Marital
1st person	ngali	ngala	nganik
2nd person	nubal	nubal	nubin
3rd person	bula	bulala	bulen

Typically, if the subject of a sentence is not qualified by a numeral or adjective, a subject-marker pronoun is used. Thus: yongka baal boyak yaakiny (lit. "kangaroo it on-rock standing"), "the kangaroo is standing on the rock."

=== Adjectives ===
Adjectives precede nouns. Some adjectives form the comparative by addition of the suffix -jin but more generally the comparative is formed by reduplication, a common feature in Pama-Nyungan languages. The same is also true for intensified or emphatic adjectives, comparable to the English word very. The superlative is formed by the addition of -jil.

=== Negation ===
Statements are negated by adding the appropriate particle to the end of the sentence. There are three negation particles:

- bart used generally with verbs
- yuada used generally with adjectives

There is also an adverbial negation word, bru, roughly equivalent to the English less or without.

=== Interrogatives ===
Questions are formed by the addition of the interrogative interjection kannah alongside the infinitive root of the verb.

== Vocabulary ==
Many words vary in a regular way from dialect to dialect, depending on the area. For example: the words for bandicoot include quernt (south) and quenda (west); the word for water may be käip (south) or kapi (west), or the word for fire may vary from kaall to karl.

A large number of modern place names in Western Australia end in -up, such as Joondalup, Nannup and Manjimup. This is because in the Noongar language, -up means "place of". For example, the name Ongerup means "place of the male kangaroo". The word gur, ger or ker in Noongar meant "a gathering". Daisy Bates suggests that central to Noongar culture was the karlupgur, referring to those that gather around the hearth (karlup).

Noongar words which have been adopted into Western Australian English, or more widely in English, include the given name Kylie, "boomerang", gilgie or jilgie, the freshwater crayfish Cherax quinquecarinatus, and gidgie or gidgee, "spear". The word for smoke, karrik, was adopted for the family of compounds known as karrikins. The word quokka, denoting a type of small macropod, is thought to come from Noongar.

Vocabulary list from Blake (1981)
English	Nyungar
man	nyungar
woman	yok
mother	ngangk
father	mam
head	kat
eye	miyel
nose	muly
ear	twangk
mouth	tya
tongue	tyarliny
tooth	ngorlak
hand	mar
breast	pip
stomach	kopurl
urine	kump
faeces	kwun
thigh	yaty
foot	tyin
bone	kwety
blood	ngup
dog	twert
snake	nurn
kangaroo	yongka
possum	kelang
spider	kar
emu	wety
swan	marlee
eaglehawk	warlity
crow	wartang
sun	ngangk
moon	miyak
star	malyern
stone	poy
water	kep
camp	may
fire	karl
smoke	puy
food	marany
meat	taty
stand	yakiny
sit	nyininy
see	tyinanginy
go	kurliny
get	paranginy
hit	paminy
kill	watanginy
I	ngany
you	nyun
one	keny
two	kutyal
ocean	waadan
river	bilya
Perth	Boorloo
Swan River	Derbarl Yerrigan

== See also ==
- Boodjar Nyungar Placenames

== Sources ==
- Abbott, Ian (2001). "Aboriginal names of mammal species in south-west Western Australia". CALMScience. 3 (4): 433–486.
- Abbott, Ian (2009). "Aboriginal names of bird species in south-west Western Australia, with suggestions for their adoption into common usage" (PDF). Conservation Science Western Australia Journal. 7 (2): 213–78 [255]. Archived from the original (PDF) on 23 March 2023.
- "Learn some of the Noongar language". ABC Education. Australian Broadcasting Corporation. 2 December 2021.
- "Place of the Male Kangaroo". Albany Gateway Co-operative. 28 July 2006. Archived from the original on 11 September 2006.
- "Language Statistics for Aboriginal and Torres Strait Islander Peoples, 2016". Australian Bureau of Statistics. 11 April 2022. Table 1.2.1 Census 2016.
- Australian Dictionary of Biography (1966). "Sir George Grey (1812–1898)". Australian Dictionary of Biography. Vol. 1. National Centre of Biography, Australian National University. ISBN 978-0-522-84459-7. ISSN 1833-7538. OCLC 70677943.
- "Noongar / Nyoongar (W41)". Australian Institute of Aboriginal and Torres Strait Islander Studies.
- Baker, Brett (2014). "Word Structure in Australian Languages". In Koch, Harold; Nordlinger, Rachel (eds.). The Languages and Linguistics of Australia. A Comprehensive Guide. Berlin: De Gruyter. pp. 139–214. doi:10.1515/9783110279771.139. ISBN 978-3-11-027969-6. OCLC 890950468. OL 36706854M.
- "Western and Northern Aboriginal Language Alliance. Wanala Conference 2013. Authors". Batchelor Press. 2013. Archived from the original on 7 March 2016.
- Bates, Daisy M. (1914). "A few Notes on some South-Western Australian Dialects". The Journal of the Royal Anthropological Institute of Great Britain and Ireland. 44. London: Royal Anthropological Institute of Great Britain and Ireland: 65–82. doi:10.2307/2843531. JSTOR 2843531.
- Bates, Daisy M. (1938). The Passing of the Aborigines. London: John Murray. OCLC 621612. OL 20053610M. Wikidata Q128038330.
- Bates, Daisy M. (1939). The Passing of the Aborigines. New York: G. P. Putnam's Sons. OCLC 832094. Wikidata Q128041316.
- Bindon, Peter; Chadwick, Ross, eds. (2011). A Nyoongar wordlist: from the south-west of Western Australia (2nd ed.). Welshpool, Western Australia: Western Australian Museum. ISBN 9781920843595. LCCN 2014482022. OCLC 747854664. OL 31295240M.
- Blake, Barry J. (1981). Australian Aboriginal languages: a general introduction. London: Angus & Robertson Publishers. ISBN 0-207-14044-8.
- Bourke, Keane (4 July 2022). "Indigenous languages being taught to 10,000 Western Australian school kids". ABC News. Australian Broadcasting Corporation.
- Collard, Len (7 September 2015). "Noongarpedia" (Interview). Interviewed by Todhunter, Rhian. RTRFM. Archived from the original on 8 April 2020.
- "CurtinX: Noongar Language and Culture". Curtin University. 2025.
- "Sharing The Dreaming". Apple. Department of Parks and Wildlife, Government of Western Australia. 12 July 2019.
- Douglas, Wilf (1996). Illustrated dictionary of the South-West Aboriginal language (Thesis). Claremont, Western Australia: Edith Cowan University.
- Eberhard, David M.; Simons, Gary F.; Fennig, Charles D., eds. (2025a). "Nyungar". Ethnologue. Languages of the World (28th ed.). Dallas: SIL International.
- Eberhard, David M.; Simons, Gary F.; Fennig, Charles D., eds. (2025b). "English". Ethnologue. Languages of the World (28th ed.). Dallas: SIL International.
- Grey, George (1839a). Vocabulary of the Aboriginal Language of Western Australia – via Wikisource.
- Grey, George (24 August 1839). "Vocabulary of the Aboriginal Language of Western Australia". The Perth Gazette and Western Australian Journal. Vol. 7, no. 346. Western Australia. pp. 135–136 – via National Library of Australia.
- "Language". Kaartdijin Noongar. South West Aboriginal Land and Sea Council. 2025.
- "Noongar Language Apps". Kart Koort Wiern. 2015.
- Kennedy, Sharon (9 July 2010). "Learning Noongar language". Australian Broadcasting Corporation. Archived from the original on 5 June 2013.
- Long, Katrin (13 February 2014). "WA academics develop Noongar 'Wikipedia' to help preserve language". ABC News. Australian Broadcasting Corporation.
- McCabe, Timothy Francis (2012). Baalaa Kaarl Killelbirriny (His Hearth and Home of the Sergeant Ant): a study of the cultural landscapes of the Noongar Cliff Humphries (PhD thesis). Bentley: Curtin University. hdl:20.500.11937/1192.
- "Love of Noongar language leads to new version of King Gizzard album". NITV News. NITV. 7 July 2022.
- "Language". Noongar Boodjar Language Cultural Aboriginal Corporation. 2025a.
- "Home". Noongar Boodjar Language Cultural Aboriginal Corporation. 2025b.
- "[untitled]". Oxford Dictionary of English.
- "Shakespeare in Noongar a world first" (PDF). Perth Festival. 31 October 2019. Archived from the original (PDF) on 8 May 2024.
- OpenStreetMap contributors. Perth Metropolitan Area (Map). OpenStreetMap.
- Rahaman, Hafizur; Johnston, Michelle; Champion, Erik (2021). "Audio-augmented arboreality: wildflowers and language". Digital Creativity. 32 (1): 22–37. doi:10.1080/14626268.2020.1868536. hdl:20.500.11937/82325.
- Rooney, Bernard (2011). Nyoongar Dictionary. Batchelor: Batchelor Press. ISBN 9781741312331. LCCN 2012452487. OCLC 758415481. OL 30720206M.
- "639 Identifier Documentation: nys". SIL Global. 2025.
- "ISO 639-3 Registration Authority. Request for Change to ISO 639-3 Language Code" (PDF). SIL International. 22 August 2018.
- "Njunga (WA)". South Australian Museum. 5 June 2019. Archived from the original on 6 May 2021.
- Spehn-Jackson, Lois (2015). Noongar Waangkiny: A Learner's Guide to Noongar (PDF) (2nd ed.). Batchelor, Northern Territory: Batchelor Press. ISBN 978-1-74131-293-5.
- Stirling, Lesley; Dench, Alan (2012). "Tense, Aspect, Modality and Evidentiality in Australian Languages: Foreword". Australian Journal of Linguistics. 32 (1): 1–6. doi:10.1080/07268602.2012.662888.
- Symmons, Charles (1842). "Grammatical Introduction to the Study of the Aboriginal Language of Western Australia". Western Australia Almanack – via State Library of New South Wales.
- Turner, Rebecca (25 January 2020). "Noongar language reborn in Hecate, an Aboriginal translation of Shakespeare's Macbeth at Perth Festival". ABC News. Australian Broadcasting Corporation.
- "A Noongar word for 'smoke' finds a place in science". University of Western Australia. 6 March 2009.
- Whitehurst, Rose (1997). Noongar Dictionary. Noongar to English and English to Noongar (PDF) (2nd ed.). East Perth: Noongar Language and Culture Centre. ISBN 0-646-12355-6. Archived from the original (PDF) on 8 August 2019.
- Woods, Meghan (10 November 2016). "NoongarPedia created as first Wikipedia site in Aboriginal language". ABC News. Radio National (Awaye!). Australian Broadcasting Corporation.
- Wynne, Emma (1 August 2021). "WA schools take first steps towards offering formal Noongar language learning". ABC News. Australian Broadcasting Corporation. "The fact is that the overwhelming majority of our schools are in Noongar country, so we feel a real significant need to expand the support that we provide for teachers of Noongar in particular."
