= Leonard Collard =

Professor, University of Western Australia

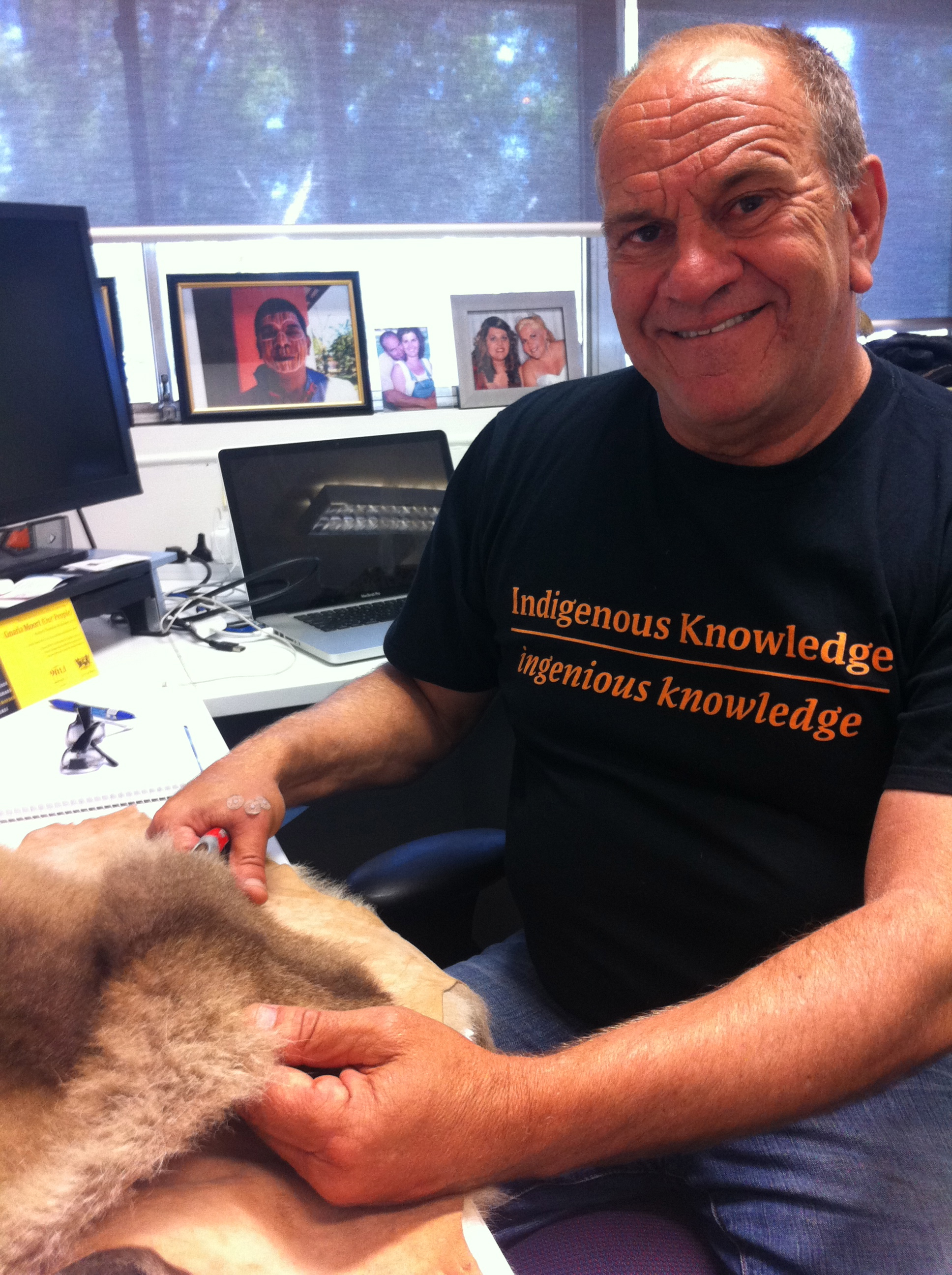
- Born: Leonard Michael Collard; 24 December 1959 (age 66); Pingelly, Western Australia
- Education: Murdoch University (MA 1996)

Leonard Michael Collard (born 24 December 1959) is a Noongar elder, professor and Australian Research Council chief investigator at the School of Indigenous Studies, University of Western Australia.

Collard is a Whadjuk/Balardong Noongar, the traditional owners of the Perth region of Western Australia. He has a background in literature and communications, and has researched areas including Noongar interpretive histories and Noongar theoretical and practical research models.

In 2011 Collard started a three-year study of Noongar place names, and intends to create a public website of 25,000 Noongar words for different places around the South West of Western Australia. In 2014 he announced his project to create the world's first online Aboriginal encyclopaedia, Noongarpedia, to preserve the endangered Noongar language.

== Publications ==
- Mooro nyungar katitijin bidi - Mooro peoples knowledge trail : interpretation of the City of Stirling Local Government Area literature review. Leonard Collard, Angela Rooney and Laura Stocker, 2014
- Nartji katitj bidi ngulluckiny korrl? : (which knowledge path will we travel?). Len Collard and Sandra Harben, 2010.
- Beeliar Boodjar : an introduction to the Aboriginal history of the City of Cockburn based on existing literature. Leonard Collard and Clint Bracknall, 2001.
- Nyittiny : cosmology of the Nuyngar of South-Western Australia. Leonard Collard, 2008
- Aboriginal young people in the southeast of Western Australia : implications for youth policy. Len Collard and Dave Palmer, 1991.
