= Wallam =

Wallam is a surname. Notable people with the surname include:

- Angus Wallam (1926–2014), Noongar Aboriginal elder
- Donnell Wallam (born 1994), Australian netball player

== See also ==
- Wallam Kynshi (born 1989), Indian cricketer
