= Laves =

Laves may refer to:

- Fritz Laves (1906–1978), a German crystallographer
- Georg Ludwig Friedrich Laves (1788–1864), German architect
- Gerhardt Laves (1906–1993), American linguist
- Laves phase, a class of intermetallic phases
- Laves graph, a periodic spatial graph
- Laves tiling, dual of an Archimedean tiling
