= Bennell =

Bennell is a surname.

== People ==
Notable people with the name include:

- Eddie Bennell (1939–1991), Australian playwright, prose writer, and boxer
- Harley Bennell (born 1992), Australian rules footballer
- Jamie Bennell (born 1990), Australian rules footballer

== Fictional characters ==
- Carol Bennell in the film The Invasion
- Dr Miles Bennell in the film Invasion of the Body Snatchers

== See also ==
- Katherine Bennell-Pegg (born 1984), Australian space engineer and qualified astronaut
