= Angela Ryder =

Australian Aboriginal activist

Angela Ryder is a Wilman Noongar activist and community leader from Western Australia who is a co-founder of the Langford Aboriginal Association and the Senior Manager of Aboriginal Services with Relationships Australia.

Ryder was born in Denmark, Western Australia, and is a member of the Stolen Generation. She was removed from her family and placed in Wandering and Roelands Missions between the ages of 8 and 12. Her mother was also stolen. In the early 1980s she got a government job in Katanning and was later transferred to Perth where she has lived for many years.

== Career ==
Ryder is a Noongar speaker and is committed to restoring the language to members of the Stolen Generation and all Western Australians. As well as being a former Chairperson of the Langford Aboriginal Association and Senior Manager of Aboriginal Services with Relationships Australia, Angela Ryder has acted as treasurer for NAIDOC Perth and been a broadcaster on Noongar Radio with the Yorgas Yarning program. She is also a former member of the board of Yule Brook College. She attended the launch of the internal Moorditj Moodle website for Polytechnic West in May 2012. The Moorditj Moodle contains Noongar language content for the college.

In January 2010, the Langford Aboriginal Association celebrated the creation of a bush food garden and the launch of a series of children's books in Noongar and English. The Langford Aboriginal Association provides language courses in Noongar for children and adults and is one of the main organisations in Western Australia dedicated to reviving and teaching the Noongar language.

Ryder's contributions to her community were recognised in 2013 at the Perth NAIDOC Awards Ceremony when she was named The Community Person of the Year.

Ryder was also one of the inaugural 100 women inducted into the Western Australian Women's Hall of Fame in 2011 in a ceremony to mark the 100th anniversary of International Women's Day. She was the 81st in a list of the 100 most inspirational Western Australian women.

More recently, in October 2017, Angela Ryder was awarded the Curtin University John Curtin Medal for her long standing leadership in the community.

== Personal life ==
Ryder is a Noongar woman, mother and grandmother and wife .
