= Boodjar Nyungar Placenames =

Online resource for Western Australian Nyungar Aboriginal place names

Boodjar Nyungar Placenames is an online resource of Western Australian Nyungar Aboriginal place names.

It is the result of a research project into place names in the Southwest Western Australia region in which Nyungar have traditional associations.

Boodjar is the Nyungar word for "country". Smaller areas in the larger area also have the word used.
