= Charmaine Bennell =

Noongar author and illustrator from Western Australia

Charmaine Bennell is a Noongar author and illustrator from Western Australia. Her published books are written in the Noongar language, the language of Indigenous Australians in the South West of Western Australia. She is the daughter of Glen and Phyllis Bennell (née Wallam) and was born in Pingelly. When she was a child her family moved to Bunbury.

Charmaine was a Noongar language teacher at Djidi Djidi Aboriginal School in Bunbury and is now studying for a Bachelor of Arts of Indigenous Languages and Linguistics degree. While working at Sister Kate's, Charmaine started the Languages Other than English program to teach Noongar. She is passionate about saving and teaching the Noongar language.

== Author ==
- Charmaine Bennell; Cindy Garlett; illustrator Charmaine Bennell (2005). Nyingarn Koorda Djinanginy (Echidna looks for a friend). Batchelor, Northern Territory: Batchelor Press. ISBN 174131030X.
- Charmaine Bennell (2009). Maambakoort. Batchelor, Northern Territory: Batchelor Press. ISBN 9781741311785.
- Charmaine Bennell (2009). Marlak. Batchelor, Northern Territory: Batchelor Press. ISBN 9781741311747.
- Charmaine Bennell; illustrator Charmaine Bennell (2005). Kaditj-Kaditj. Batchelor, Northern Territory: Batchelor Press. ISBN 174131044X.
- Charmaine Bennell; illustrations by Charmaine Bennell (2013). Ngalak Waakarl Ngardanginy : We're going on a Rainbow Serpent Hunt. Batchelor, Northern Territory: Batchelor Press. ISBN 9781741312805.

== Illustrator ==
- Yarran, Kathy (2010). Koorlbardi wer waardong (The magpie and the crow). Bennell, Charmaine., (ilus.). Batchelor Press. ISBN 978-1-74131-228-7.
- Dann, Gloria (2005). Koora koora (Long long time ago). Bennell, Charmaine., (ilus.). Batchelor Press. ISBN 1741310482.
- Humphries, Valma (2006). Windja Yongka Kwobidak Bwoka Baranginy (Where the kangaroo got his beautiful coat). Bennell, Charmaine., (ilus.). Batchelor Press. ISBN 9781741310658.
- Yarran, Kathy (2006). Maawit Nget-nget Koomba Keba Waakarl (The Little mouse and the great big water snake). Bennell, Charmaine., (ilus.). Batchelor Press. ISBN 9781741310610.
- Waakarl kardakoor bilya-k = The Rainbow Serpent from Blackwood River / storyteller, Lorraine Smith-Marshall; original illustrations, Sonya Khan; audio storytelling, Charmaine Bennell; language consultants, Lois Sphen-Jackson ... et al.; English editor, Maree Klesch
- Moort family reader series / concept: Denise Smith-Ali, Gloria Dann, Charmaine Bennel, Maree Klesch; English text : Maree Klesch; Noongar translations : Lois Spehn-Jackson; illustrations: Marissa Clausen
