= Veronica Willaway =

Aboriginal Australian religious sister

Sister Veronica Willaway OSB

Personal life
- Born: Veronica Therese Willaway New Norcia, Western Australia
- Parents: Harold Willaway (father); Philomena Willaway (mother)

Religious life
- Religion: Catholic
- Denomination: Roman Catholic
- Order: Benedictines

Veronica Therese Willaway OSB (born 9 December c.1944) also known as Sister Veronica, is a Yued Noongar woman from New Norcia in Western Australia. She spent her childhood at St Joseph's school and orphanage, an institution for Aboriginal girls in New Norcia, before deciding to become a Benedictine sister herself.

== Early life and education ==
Willaway grew up in New Norcia, Australia's only monastic town, which is located 130 km north of Perth, Western Australia. She was one of six children of Philomena and Harold Willaway. When she was six years of age her parents placed her at St Joseph's Orphanage under the care of the Spanish Benedictine Missionary Sisters. It was common practice at the time that many Aboriginal children from the New Norcia area came to live at the orphanage. Willaway's five siblings also came to live there.

== Religious life ==
Influenced by the sisters and monks at New Norcia, in 1958, at the age of 14, Willaway decided to become a Benedictine sister herself. After a year as a postulant Willaway entered the novitiate on 23 January 1960. Her profession date was 21 January 1962 and she took her final vows on 12 March 1966 when she was 21. Willaway was the second Aboriginal sister to join the congregation; Sister Cecilia Farrell had been the first. Most of Willaway's early religious life was spent time working in St Joseph's Orphanage in New Norcia, which later became a school. In 1974 Willaway moved to Girrawheen, a suburb of Perth, where she ran a childcare centre.

After a year in this role, the Benedictine Sisters made the decision to leave Australia and return to Spain, and invited Willaway to join them. On 24 March 1975, Willaway embarked from Fremantle on the ship Galileo, on a six-week voyage to Barcelona. After her arrival she worked once again in a childcare centre, caring for young children and learning Spanish while living in Barcelona. After three years Willaway returned to Australia and spent time at the Kalumburu mission in the north of Western Australia, remaining there until 1982. She then returned to New Norcia to help the Filipino Missionary Benedictine Sisters of Tutzing, who had come to Australia at the invitation of the monks at New Norcia. Over the next few years Willaway moved geographically but also into another branch of her order. In October 1984 some of the sisters from the Spanish Congregation were integrated into the Congregation of the Missionary Benedictine Sisters of Tutzing and four years later, that community left New Norcia to work with Aboriginal students at the Pallottine Centre at Rossmoyne, in Perth. In 1987 Willaway returned to Kalumburu.

In 1989 she was asked to go to the United States of America to assist at the Norfolk Priory. She was then sent to Winnebago Indian Reservation for two years to help the community in the school and convent. Willaway has noted that "I could identify with the Native Americans' sad past of having their culture suppressed and their children placed in white boarding schools to be integrated into white American culture."

In mid-1991 Willaway was transferred back to the Norfolk Priory in Nebraska. She has remained living in Norfolk since then, apart from a year spent working at the Aboriginal Catholic Ministry of Western Australia in 2015–2016. When she was in Bendigo in Victoria in May 2021 she was present when the Director of Aboriginal Catholic Ministry presented a message stick to student leaders as a sacred symbol to empower them to be a voice for mission.

Willaway contributed to an episode of the Australian Broadcasting Corporation's (ABC) Compass program, Series 30 - Episode 10, hosted by Geraldine Doogue. The episode, titled "Salvado's letters", was about Rosendo Salvado, the Spanish Benedictine monk who founded the religious community in New Norcia in 1847.

An episode of the ABC's Soul Search program, hosted by Meredith Lake, also discusses the history of the Benedictine religious sisters from New Norcia, focusing particularly on Willaway's story.
