= Whadjuk =

Noongar people of the Swan Coastal Plain in Western Australia

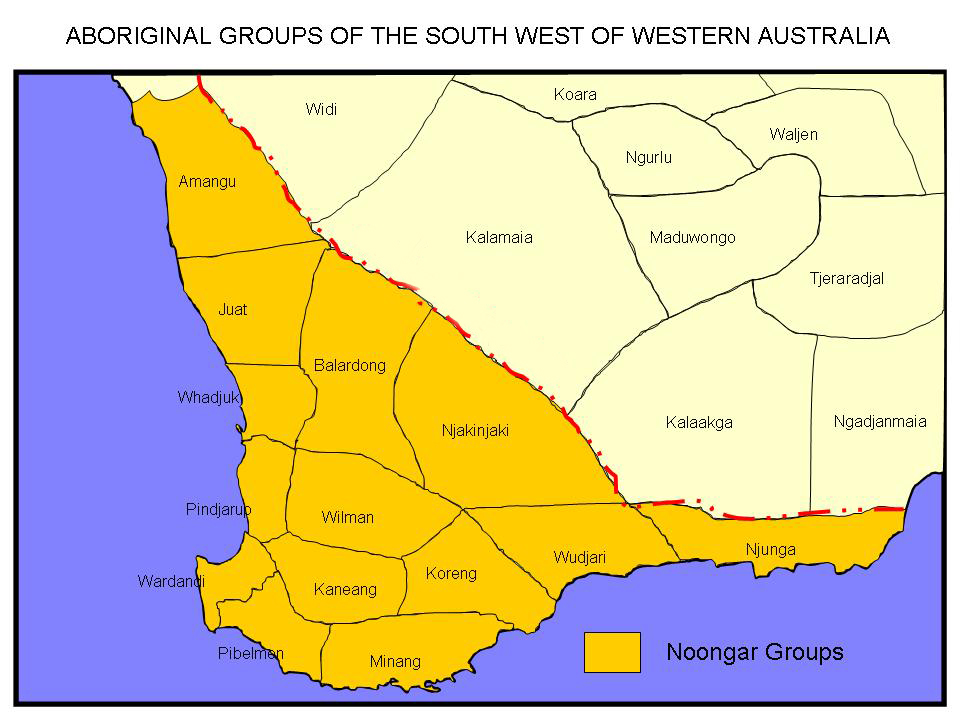
Noongar language groups

Whadjuk or Wadjak, alternatively Witjari, are Noongar (Aboriginal Australian) people of the Western Australian region of the Perth bioregion of the Swan Coastal Plain. They were divided by the Swan and Canning Rivers into four residence groups. The Whadjuk people bore the brunt of the European colonisation, as the cities of Perth and Fremantle were built in their territory.

== Name ==
The ethnonym appears to derive from whad, the Whadjuk word for 'no'. (Note: This equates with other words in the Noongar dialect continuum – wada/'yuad/i:wat, all meaning 'no'.)

== Country ==
The traditional tribal territory of the Whadjuk, in Norman Tindale's estimate, takes in some 6,700 square kilometres (2,600 mi^{2}) of land, from the Swan River, together with its eastern and northern tributaries. Its hinterland extension runs to Mount Helena and a little beyond. It includes Kalamunda on the Darling Scarp and Armadale. It encompasses the Victoria Plains to the north, the area south of Toodyay and reaches eastwards as far as York and a little beyond. Its southern coastal frontier extends to the vicinity of Pinjarra. Their northern neighbours are the Yued, the Balardong people lay to their east, and the Pindjarup on their southern coastal flank.

== Culture and pre-history ==
The Whadjuk formed part of the Noongar language group, with their own distinctive dialect. Culturally they were divided into two matrilineal moieties:

- Wardungmat, from wardung (the Australian raven, Corvus coronoides) and mat (lineage; meaning 'stock, family, leg')
- Manitjmat, from manitj (western corella, Cacatua pastinator) and mat

Moieties were endogamous, and children took the moiety of their mother. Each moiety also contained two "sections" (or "skins"): in the case of the Manitjmat, these were Didarruk and Tondarup and for the Wardungmat, they were Nagarnook and Ballarruk.

The Whadjuk also preserved many stories of the Wagyl, a water-python held to be responsible for most of the water features around Perth. This may have been a cultural memory of an extinct Madtsoiidae python-like serpent, a water dwelling ambush predator, part of the extinct megafauna of Australia that disappeared between 40,000 and 20,000 years ago.

Coastal dwelling Whadjuk have an oral tradition describing the separation of Rottnest from the mainland, which occurred between 12,000 and 8,000 BCE, technically a post-glacial Flandrian transgression. (Note: The early British settler and diarist George Fletcher Moore wrote an account of this tradition.)

=== Seasonal divisions ===
Like other Noongar peoples, the Whadjuk seem to have moved more inland in the wetter weather of winter, returning to the coast as interior seasonal lakes dried up. The Whadjuk, like many Noongar people, divided the year into six seasons.

- Birak: November to December, was the "fruiting", characterised by the onset of hot, easterly winds which blow during the day. Noongar people used to burn mosaic sections of scrubland to force animals into the open to hunt, and to open the canopy and allow the few November rains to increase germination of summer foodstuffs and marsupial grazing. This was the season of harvesting wattle seeds which were pounded into flour and stored as damper.
- Bunuru: January to February, was the "hot-dry", characterised by hot dry easterly conditions with afternoon sea-breezes, known locally in Western Australia as the Fremantle doctor. To maximise the effects of these cooling breezes, the Noongars moved to coastal estuaries and reefs where fish and abalone constituted a large proportion of the seasonal diet. Mallee fowl eggs from tuart forests also formed a part of the diet.
- Djeran: March to April, was "first rains-first dew", with the weather becoming cooler with winds from the south west. Fishing continued (often with fish traps) and zamia palm nuts, nardoo bulbs, and other seeds were collected for food. Zamia palm nuts are naturally highly poisonous but they are edible after being leached with water. Moaning frogs were caught in large numbers with the opening rains of winter.
- Makuru: from May to June, was "the wet", and Noongars moved inland from the coast to the Darling Scarp to hunt grey kangaroo and tammar once rains had replenished inland water resources. This was the season of mid-latitude cold frontal rains. Malleefowl were also caught.
- Djilba: from July to August, was "the cold-wet" saw Noongar groups moving to the drier soils of the Guildford and Canning-Kelmscott areas, where roots were collected and emus, ringtail possums, and kangaroo were hunted.
- Kambarang: from September to October, was "the flowering" at the height of the wildflower season. This time saw rain decreasing. Families moved towards the coast where frogs, tortoises, gilgies and blue marron were caught. Birds returning from their Northern Hemisphere migration also formed a part of their diet.

These seasons were roughly divided (rather than by specific date) and Whadjuk took account of environmental signals such as the spring call of the motorbike frog, in marking seasons. For example, the onset of Kambarang, or the flowering of the Western Australian Christmas tree showing the onset of Bunuru.

=== Ceremonies ===
Whadjuk used high quality red ochre in ceremonies, which they obtained from the site now occupied by Perth Railway Station and which they traded with people to the east. By repute it was traded as far as Uluru. Prior to the colonisation it was used to colour hair, which was worn long (in a style similar to dreadlocks). Quartz from the Darling Scarp was also traded with Balardong groups for the making of spears.

== Contact history ==
The Whadjuk people bore the brunt of the European colonisation, as the cities of Perth and Fremantle were built in their territory.

No doubt Whadjuk people had been familiar with Dutch explorers like Vlamingh, and the occasional visit of whalers to the coast, before the arrival of settlers under the command of Governor James Stirling. After a near disaster at Garden Island, a long-boat under the command of Captain (later Lieutenant Governor) Irwin was dispatched and met with Yellagonga and his family at Crawley, on the coast of what is now the University of Western Australia or by Mount Eliza. As Aboriginal women had been earlier seized by European seal hunters, Yellagonga subsequently moved his encampment to Galup.

With the alienation from their lands due to settlers claiming land and fencing it off, Aboriginal people lost access to important seasonal foods, they did not understand or accept private ownership of their lands, which led to spearing of stock and digging in food gardens. Reprisals led to a cycle of increased violence on both sides. The first attempted Aboriginal massacre was the "Battle for Perth" when there was an attempt to surround and capture Aboriginal people who had retreated into Galup. The area was cordoned, but the hunted people escaped. Once Galup was settled by the Monger family, Yellagonga moved to Lake Joondalup. In 1834 this Wanneroo area was explored by John Butler, and in 1838 by George Grey. With the lands seized for settlement in 1843, Yellagonga was reduced to begging for survival, and shortly thereafter he accidentally drowned.

The situation for Midgegooroo was even more precarious. Violence flared when it was said 200 "savages" were going to attack the ferry from Fremantle, and citizens armed themselves and rushed to the site to find nothing but a bemused ferryman. A Tasmanian settler shot one of the local Aboriginal men and Yagan, Midgegooroo's son and Yellagonga's nephew, speared a settler in revenge. Yagan was arrested and sent to Carnac Island in the care of Robert Lyon who claimed he was a freedom fighter. Yagan escaped from the island in a boat, and waged a guerrilla campaign on both sides of the river. He was eventually killed by one of two European boys he had befriended and his head was smoked and sent to England, finally being recovered and returned home by Ken Colbung in 1997.

Following the Pinjarra massacre, Whadjuk Aboriginal people became totally dispirited, and were reduced to dependent status, settling at their site at Mount Eliza for handouts under the authority of Francis Armstrong. An Anglican school was established for a number of years at Ellenbrook, but was never very successful and was greatly underfunded.

Relations between the settlers and the Noongar people had deteriorated badly in the final years of Stirling's reign, with settlers shooting at Aboriginal people indiscriminately for the spearing of stock, leading to payback killings of settlers. Stirling's response was to attempt to subdue the Aboriginal people through harsh punishment. When Stirling retired he was replaced as Governor by John Hutt, 1 January 1839, who rather than adopting Stirling's vindictive vengeful policies against "Aborigines", tried protecting their rights and educating them. This ran foul of frontier settlers intent on seizing Aboriginal lands without compensation, who felt they needed strong-arm tactics to protect themselves from Aboriginal "reprisals". In 1887 an Aboriginal reserve for the remaining Whadjuk people was established near Lake Gnangara, one of a whole series of wetlands which may have, within the memory of Aboriginal people here, been a series of caves along an underground river whose roof fell in. This reserve was re-established in 1975. In addition to the "feeding station" at Mount Eliza, under the control of Francis Armstrong, first "Protector of Aborigines". Hutt also tried to establish an Aboriginal yeomanry by giving Aboriginal "settlers" grants of government land. The lands chosen for this venture were marginal and Aboriginal people were expected to make improvements without giving them access to needed bank finance, so the scheme quickly collapsed. Aboriginal campsites were temporarily established at many metropolitan locations including Ellenbrook, Jolimont, Welshpool and Allawah Grove. These sites however were frequently moved at the discretion of European authorities once an alternative use was found for the land (as happened at Karrakatta Cemetery, the Swanbourne Rifle Range and Perth Airport).

In 1893 the granting of self-government to Western Australia, specifically excluded provision for Aboriginal Affairs, which remained vested in the British crown. The state's constitution also stated that 1% of government expenditures had to be for the benefit of Aboriginal people, a condition that has never been met. The Premier John Forrest unilaterally took control in Aboriginal Affairs, without an amendment to the constitution in 1896. As of 2016, Aboriginal people number 3% of the state's population, but number 50% of the women in Bandyup Women's Prison and of youth in detention in Western Australia. Many are imprisoned for the non-payment of fines incurred for minor offences. The number of Noongar youth in incarceration exceeds the number in school or formal training.

Daisy Bates claimed she interviewed the last fully initiated Whadjuk Noongar people in 1907, reporting on informants Fanny Balbel and Joobaitj, who had preserved in oral tradition the Aboriginal viewpoints of the coming of the Europeans. Fanny had been born on the Aboriginal sacred site that underlies St George's Cathedral, while Joobaitj's sacred lands were near the current youth hostel at Mundaring Weir.

== Social structure ==
The Whadjuk people were divided by the Swan and Canning Rivers into four residence groups, each with its own territory:

- Beeliar. Their country lay south west of Perth, between the Canning River and Swan River. At the beginning of white settlement were led by Midgegooroo, father of Yagan.
- Beeloo. The area south of the Swan River, from Perth Water to the Canning River and bordered in the east by the Helena River and Darling Ranges. During winters they camped in the hills around Kalamunda and Mundaring, and moved back towards the rivers in spring.
- Mooro. Led by Yellagonga, they lived north and west of the Swan River.
- The Upper Swan or "mountain people", whose proper name is unknown. Early settlers believed they were led by Weeip.

Several Europeans in particular contributed to modern understanding of Whadjuk Noongar language and culture.

- Robert Menli Lyon befriended the Aboriginal resistance fighter Yagan, when the latter was exiled to Carnac Island.
- Francis Armstrong took early efforts to befriend Aboriginal people (being known to them as "Pranji Djanga"), but later in life became very authoritarian and bitter in his dealings with them.
- George Fletcher Moore rapidly came to understand the Whadjuk dialect of the Noongar language, and later came to serve as magistrate in legal cases in which Whadjuk people were involved.
- Lieutenant George Grey took great efforts to learn the Whadjuk tongue, and was recognised by the Yellagonga's Whadjuk group as being the returned dead son of an Aboriginal woman, before going on to a distinguished political career in South Australia and New Zealand.

European settlers were initially called Djanga – a term referring to spirits of the dead – by the Whadjuk. This belief incorporated Europeans into the social structure of the Noongar peoples and was reinforced by several factors. To the Whadjuk, the settlers resembled dead people because they:

- came from the west, the direction of the setting sun and Kuranyup, the land of the dead for the Whadjuk
- were pale in complexion – which was seen by the Whadjuk as the pallor of people after death
- often changed their clothing and, therefore, their general appearance
- smelled bad and often had rotten teeth, reflecting early 19th century standards of hygiene
- were not affected by infectious diseases to which most Aboriginal people had no genetic resistance

Work by Neville Green in his book Broken Spears has shown how Aboriginal culture could not explain the high death rates associated with European infections, and believed that Aboriginal sorcery was involved, leading to rising numbers of reprisal spearing and killings within the Aboriginal community. Coupled with the declining birth rates, these factors led to a collapsing population in those areas nearby European settlement. In addition to white killings and massacres in Fremantle and elsewhere, the arrival of Europeans saw many deaths from diseases to which Aboriginal people had no resistance. These were interpreted as sorcery within traditional culture and led to "pay-back" vendettas, which increased mortality of those in closest contact with Europeans.

== Aboriginal camping sites around Perth ==
- Goonininup, now built over by the present day Swan Brewery, together with the nearby site of Goodinup, marked the place where coastal and inland Noongar people met for trade and ritual purposes. It was a focal point for trading in red ochre. Male initiations also took place there. Close by was Koyamulyup (frog camp), so-called because of the abundance of frogs, an important part of the local diet. The Boya (birthing stone) there was pushed into the river by European settlers to try to prevent Aboriginal people accessing the site.
- Galup was an Aboriginal camping site until the 1920s. When it was closed the land was used for market gardening, and the Aboriginal groups moved to Jolimont and Innaloo.
- People from the site of Jolimont later moved to the site of the Swanbourne Rifle Range, later resumed by the Australian Army in 1913.
- There was also a small Aboriginal camping site near the Australian Broadcasting Corporation building in East Perth and on Heirisson Island. The shallows off Heirisson Island, known as Matagarup (transl. leg deep) afforded a passage for crossing the Swan River. They were later moved to Burswood, until the site became a garbage dump for the city of Perth, before finally becoming the site of the Burswood Casino.
- Wanneroo ("the place where women dig yams") had a number of Aboriginal camp sites, well into the 20th century. Orchestra Shell Cave in Wanneroo had Aboriginal paintings on the roof and walls. George Grey met Aboriginal people at Lake Joondalup when he returned to Perth.
- Welshpool was a camping site for Aboriginal people at the turn of the 20th century. Daisy Bates conducted most of her interviews with Perth Aboriginal people here.
- Bennett Brook is significant to Aboriginal people, as it is believed that it was formed by the creative activities of the Waugal. It is said that the Waugal's resting place is a cave in the deep, still water. Python Bridge crosses Bennett Brook approximately 200 metres (660 ft) from its confluence with the Swan River and it is believed to be the home of an evil and dangerous spirit. Some Aboriginal families have said that camping areas existed from the southern boundaries of this site to Bennett Swamp in pre-contact times. There is a tradition of digging wells for freshwater supplies in the western bank of Bennett Brook and a traditional fish trap supplied food for these camps. Benara Road is the southern boundary to this Aboriginal site. From the 1930s to 1960s, Aboriginal camps spread across Lord Street into the area that is now a housing estate. It is reported that burials have taken place between Benara Road and Widgee Road, however their exact location is not known.
- Aboriginal people from the Swan River made their campsites along Perth's central lakes to avoid the salty lakes closer to the coast. 16 Aboriginal campsites have been found in the City of Cockburn
- In 1941 a group of Swan Valley Noongar women purchased 8 hectares (20 acres) of bushland bounded by Gallagher Street and Mary Crescent, Eden Hill. The local council refused their requests for water and applications to build housing so they camped in mia-mias, bush breaks and tin camps and relied on water dug from their own wells. In the 1950s the area was resumed by the State Housing Commission for the creation of the suburb of Eden Hill.
- The Swan Valley Nyungah Community (SVNC) was an Aboriginal community of Noongar people at Lockridge, Western Australia. In controversial circumstances, the Government of Western Australia closed the settlement in 2003 by act of Parliament. The buildings were later bulldozed by the Barnett government. SVNC are amongst the leaders of the 2015–2016 Aboriginal Refugee community on Heirisson Island.
- Munday Swamp is located against the northeastern perimeter fence of Perth Airport, southwest of King Road and west of the Forrestfield and Kewdale Railway Yards. Munday Swamp was an area of ancient Aboriginal usage and had been used as a turtle-fishing ground in pre-contact times. The Melaleuca shrub offered shade and coolness to the turtle fishermen, who were known to camp there on occasions. These days, Munday Swamp lies on private property beside the Perth Airport's perimeter fence.
- Nyibra Swamp has been used by Aboriginal people from Bayswater and Bassendean areas as a fishing area from the 1920s until recent times.
- Bibra Lake was a frequently used camping ground as the presence of Aboriginal artefacts from the area attests.
- Walyunga hosts one of the largest known Aboriginal campsites near Perth, used by regional tribes for more than 60,000 years, now a National Park.
- Gnangara hosted a large Aboriginal camping site. Gnangara contained the Aboriginal Community College (K-12), founded in 1979 and closed in 2008. It was one of two independent Indigenous schools in the metropolitan area.
- Allawah Grove on the north-west edge of Perth Airport in South Guildford has long been associated with "campies", as Aboriginals called themselves. It was gazetted as an Aboriginal reserve in 1911, and repeated efforts were made to shift indigenous people into there, despite their refusal to stay on the site, preferring their traditional campsites around Eden Hill. Eventually in the late 1950s, Aboriginals from camps in Bassendean and Eden Hill accepted the site because, harassed by a policy of keeping native people out of the Perth area and often left homeless, the government offered to house them on the site and guarantee some freedom from continual police harassment. By February 1958 some 29 families, constituted by 220 people, had settled there.
- Weld Square in Northbridge was often used as a camping spot by Aboriginal people. The Aboriginal Advancement Council established its headquarters there in the 1940s.

== Alternative names and spellings ==
Some alternative names and spellings:

- Caractterup tribe
- Derbal
- Ilakuri wongi (language name)
- Juadjuk
- Karakata (a toponym for Perth)/Karrakatta (bank of Swan River at Perth)
- Minalnjunga (Yued term composed of minang (south) and njunga (man))
- Minnal Yungar
- Wadjuk, Wadjug, Whajook
- Wadjup (toponym for the flats of the Canning River)
- Witja:ri
- Yooadda
- Yooard

== Some words ==
Other words:

- gengar (white man)
- mamman (father)

== Sources ==
- "Aboriginal Community College". Association of Independent Schools (AICS Support Unit). Archived from the original on 12 September 2009.
- "Broadway Arboretum Discovery Tour Park Pack" (PDF). Bassendean Preservation Group. 2009.
- Bates, Daisy (2004) [1938]. The Passing of the Aborigines. Project Gutenberg of Australia. Wikidata Q128122479.
- Carter, Jennie (1986). The History of Bassendean. Perth: Town of Bassendean.
- Delmege, Sharon (2005). "A Trans-Generational Effect of The Aborigines Act 1905 (WA): The Making of the Fringedwellers in the South-West of Western Australia". Murdoch University Electronic Journal of Law.
- Delmege, Sharon (2015). "Allawah Grove Native Settlement: Housing and assimilation" (PDF). Aboriginal History. 39: 83–108. doi:10.22459/AH.39.2015.04.
- Green, Neville (1984). Broken Spears: Aboriginals and Europeans in the southwest of Australia. Cottesloe: Focus Education Services. ISBN 0-9591828-1-0. LCCN 85194823. OCLC 1285471045. OL 2625980M. Wikidata Q136385324.
- Green, Neville; Moon, Susan (1997). Far from Home: Aboriginal Prisoners of Rottnest Island, 1838-1931. University of Western Press. ISBN 978-1-875-56092-9.
- Grey, George (1841). Journals of Two Expeditions of Discovery in the North West and Western Australia, 1837-38. Perth, WA: Hesperian Press.
- Hallam, Sylvia J (1974). Fire and Hearth: Aboriginal Usage and European Usurpation in the South West of Western Australia. Canberra: Australian Institute for Aboriginal Studies.
- Hallam, Syvlia (1986). Aboriginal Resource Usage along the Swan River (Swan River Symposium). WAIT.
- Hughes-Hallett, Debra (2010). Indigenous history of the Swan and Canning rivers (PDF). Perth: Curtin University. Archived from the original (PDF) on 25 March 2019.
- Moore, George Fletcher (1842). A Descriptive Vocabulary of the Language in Common Use Amongst the Aboriginals of Western Australia. London: Wm. S. Orr & Co. LCCN 12028353. OCLC 5187310. OL 6549151M. Wikidata Q4656400 – via Internet Archive.
- Ryan, John C.; Brady, Danielle; Kueh, Christopher (2015). "Where Fanny Balbuk Walked: Re-imagining Perth's Wetlands". M/C Journal. 18 (6). doi:10.5204/mcj.1038.
- Tindale, Norman Barnett (1974). "Whadjuk". Aboriginal Tribes of Australia: Their Terrain, Environmental Controls, Distribution, Limits, and Proper Names. Australian National University Press. ISBN 978-0-708-10741-6. Archived from the original on 20 March 2020.
