= Glenys Collard =

Australian author

Glenys Collard is a Noongar educator and writer. She was born in 1958 at Kondinin and is a member of the Stolen Generation. She is the daughter of Donald and Sylvia Collard who had nine children removed and sent to Sister Kate's when they were living in Brookton between 1958 and 1961. At the age of two she was removed from her family and placed in Sister Kate's Children's Home, Perth. Her parents sued the State of Western Australia over the poor treatment of their children while they were at Sister Kate's. This case was lost in 2013.

Collard ran away from Sister Kate's at the age of 11. She has spoken of her experience of being a stolen child in the Bringing them Home oral history project. She is a mother of six, grandmother of 30, a great grandmother, and matriarch within her family of over 280 people. She is a published author and also spent six years as an executive board member of the Aboriginal Legal Service in Western Australia.

Collard and Rose Whitehurst started the Nyungar Language Project around 1990. They recorded elders who were Noongar speakers and helped bring about agreement on how the language should be spelled.

She has played a leading role in the Western Australian Department of Education's ABC of Two-Way Literacy and Learning project which she has co-managed with Patricia Konigsberg since 1996. Collard and Rosemary Cahill were interviewed about their work in the Education Department as Deadly Ways to Learn Education officers.

== Bibliography ==
Kwobba Keip Boya - Place of Pretty Water and Rocks, Glenys Collard, Glenys Collard, Neville Williams (illustrator), Tim Thorne (illustrator), Bunbury : Katijin Nyungar Advisory Committee ECU, 1995.

Kura, Tom Bennell, Glenys Collard, Chris Williamson (illustrator), Bunbury : Noongar Language and Culture Centre, 1991.

She was also a contributor to Education in Australia, New Zealand and the Pacific edited by Michael Crossley, Greg Hancock, Terra Sprague, Bloomsbury. 2015.
