= Gerhardt Laves =

American linguist

Gerhardt Laves (July 15, 1906 – March 14, 1993) ) was an American linguist who conducted research on several Australian Aboriginal languages.

In 1929 he was a graduate student at the University of Chicago and Yale University. Between August 1929 and August 1931 he travelled to Australia and undertook extensive fieldwork on six languages across the country. Laves was probably the first person trained in modern linguistic fieldwork and analysis to study Australian languages. He intensively studied six languages: 'Kumbaingeri' (Gumbaynggir) in northern New South Wales; 'Karadjeri' (Karajarri) at Lagrange Bay, north-west Western Australia; 'Barda' (Bardi) at Cape Leveque, north-west Western Australia; 'Kurin' (Goreng) near Albany Western Australia; and 'Hermit Hill' (Matngele) and 'Ngengumeri (Ngan'gimerri) at Daly River Northern Territory. On the basis of his work Laves concluded that all Australian languages belong to a single language family.

After his fieldwork he returned to Chicago, married [1932] and followed his mentor, Edward Sapir, to Yale in New Haven, CT where he continued his graduate studies. However, he left his studies early and became a teacher on the Navajo reservation at Shiprock, New Mexico. Several years later he returned to Chicago where he began a career with the International Harvester Company in Chicago. Laves never completed his PhD, nor did he return to linguistics or anthropology - he only published two notes based on his work on Australian languages (listed below).

His collection of materials from his fieldwork sat in storage until Mark Francillon (an anthropology student at the University of Chicago) heard about it and made contact with Laves in 1983. He arranged for the collection to be copied and deposited (as were the originals, sometime later) in the library at the Australian Institute of Aboriginal and Torres Strait Islander Studies. The collection of Aboriginal objects he acquired during his fieldwork in Australia is now held in the National Museum of Australia.

== Family ==
Laves was married to Maxine Lichtenstein and they had four children.

== Laves' publications ==
- Laves, Gerhardt. 1929a Words among Australian Aborigines, Science n.s. 70, no.1823 : Supplement, xiv.
- Laves, Gerhardt. 1929b Collecting native words, El Palacio 27(8/9), 290-1.
