= Shane Pickett =

Australian artist (1957–2010)

- Born: 1957; Quairading, Western Australia
- Died: 15 January 2010 (aged 52–53); Perth, Western Australia
- Known for: Painting

Shane Pickett (born 1957, Quairading, Western Australia. Died 15 January 2010, Perth, Western Australia) was one of the foremost Nyoongar artists. Combining his deep knowledge and concern for Nyoongar culture with a confident and individual style of gestural abstraction, Pickett created paintings that resonated with a profound but subtle immediacy. Balancing innovation with tradition, modernity with an ancient spirituality, Pickett created a complex visual metaphor for the persistence of Nyoongar culture against the colonising tide of modernity. During his career, Pickett was selected as a finalist in numerous major art prizes including the Telstra National Aboriginal and Torres Strait Islander Art Award, for which he won the 'Best Painting in a European Medium' category prize in 1986. In 2006 he was awarded first prizes at the Sunshine Coast Art Prize and the Joondalup Invitation Art Award, and in 2007 he was awarded the major prize at the inaugural Drawing Together Art Award. He has exhibited in every state and territory in Australia, as well as in the United States, Europe, Africa and Asia. His works are held in major private and public collections throughout Australia and internationally.

Pickett died suddenly in Perth, Western Australia on 15 January 2010.

== Collections ==
- Art Gallery of Western Australia, Perth.
- Museum and Art Gallery of the Northern Territory, Darwin
- National Gallery of Australia, Canberra
- National Gallery of Victoria, Melbourne
- Western Australian Museum, Perth
- Australian Institute of Aboriginal and Torres Strait Islander Studies, Canberra
- Berndt Museum of Anthropology, University of Western Australia
- BHP Collection, Western Australia
- Burswood Collection, Western Australia
- Caloundra Regional Art Gallery, Queensland
- Charles Darwin University, Northern Territory
- City of Fremantle Collection, Western Australia
- City of Joondalup Collection, Western Australia
- City of Stirling Collection, Western Australia
- City of Wanneroo Collection, Western Australia
- Edith Cowan University, Western Australia
- Flinders University Art Museum, Adelaide, South Australia
- Holmes a Court Collection, Western Australia
- King Edward Memorial Hospital, Western Australia
- Nillumbik Shire Council Art Collection, Greensborough, Victoria
- Rockhampton City Art Gallery, Rockhampton
- Royal Perth Hospital, Western Australia
- Sir Charles Gardiner Hospital Collection, Western Australia
- Subiaco Museum, Subiaco, Western Australia
- Swinburne University of Technology, Victoria
- Woodside Energy Ltd. Collection, Western Australia
