= Yued =

Region of indigenous people of Western Australia

Bibbulmun, Jun-ar
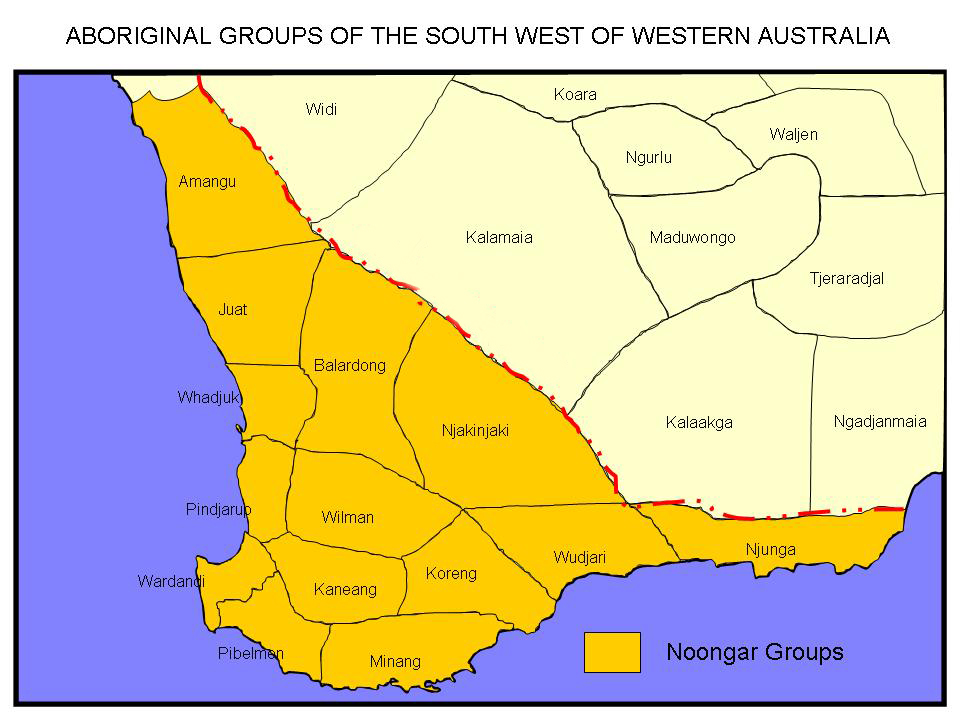
- Yued, also called Juat, in relation to other Noongar tribes

Total population
- 600 (2016, est.)

Regions with significant populations
- Moora

Languages
- Yued (dialect of Noongar)/ Aboriginal English

Related ethnic groups
- Noongar and 13 of its other groups: Amangu, Ballardong, Kaneang, Koreng, Mineng, Njakinjaki, Njunga, Pibelmen, Pindjarup, Wardandi, Whadjuk, Wiilman and Wudjari

Yued (also spelt Juat, Yuat and Juet) is a region inhabited by the Yued people, one of the fourteen groups of Noongar Aboriginal Australians who have lived in the South West corner of Western Australia for approximately 40,000 years.

European settlers first visited the Yued region in the 17th century, but it was not colonised until George Fletcher Moore’s visit in 1836. In 1846 Spanish Benedictine Monk, Rosendo Salvado created a Catholic missionary institution housing some Yued people, which became New Norcia, the only monastic town in Australia. Later impacts of European colonisation include the introduction of governmental assimilation policies such as the Aborigines Act 1905 which prompted the creation of settlement and internment camps like the Moore River Settlement, contributing to diseases within the Yued population as well as their displacement from the region.

There are ongoing projects to preserve Yued culture including the establishment of native titles, heritage plans and active cultural community programmes.

== Language ==
At the time of European settlement, the Yued language was one of the 13 dialects of the Noongar language. The Yued language specifically belongs to Djiralay (northern dialect), one of the three main dialect groups within the wider Noongar region. The other two are Kongal-Boyal (south-eastern dialect) and Kongal-Marawar (south-western dialect).

After colonisation, the number of fluent Yued speakers fell due to cultural assimilation policies which prevented Aboriginal people from practising their native language. As a result, contemporary Yued people speak a dialect of the English language known as Aboriginal English.

== Names ==
There is a lack of concrete evidence to support the idea that the endonym for the region was Yued. Some sources suggests that it is a name used by non-Yued people to refer to the region. There is evidence that, in the 19th century, some Aboriginal people living in New Norcia referred to themselves as "Jun-ar", as recorded in the memoir of Rosendo Salvado.

One exonym used by the Yued's northern neighbours for their territory was "Minnalyungar", meaning "southern people". The Whadjuk term for them was "Jaburu-Jungara", Jaburu signifying "north". In modern times, Yued is now the standard self-descriptive term used by local people in the area.

== Country ==
According to Norman Tindale, Yued/Juat country covered roughly 16,900 sq. km. and extended over Gingin, Moora, New Norcia, the Moore River and Cape Leschenault. Towards the north, their lands reached up to the area around Hill River. The inland extension ran to near Miling and the Victoria Plains.

Under the Yued native title agreement, the region starts on the coast of Western Australia and extends inland, encompassing approximately 22,000 square kilometres of land. The towns contained within this region are Leeman, Jurien Bay, Cervantes, Two Rocks, Toodyay, Gingin, Calingiri, Lancelin, Dalwallinu, Coorow and Moora. The official description on the native title agreement of what encompasses the Yued region is as follows:

All those lands and waters commencing at the intersection of the prolongation westerly of the northern boundary of the Shire of Coorow with the 3 Nautical Mile Limit being a point on a present northern boundary of Native Title Determination Application WAD6192/1998 Yued (WC1997/071) and extending generally easterly, generally south easterly, generally south westerly and generally westerly along the boundaries of that native title determination application to the intersection with the 3 Nautical Mile Limit. Then generally north westerly along that 3 Nautical Mile Limit back to the commencement point.

=== Significant geographical locations ===
Multiple geographical sites are classified on the Aboriginal heritage listing sites under the Yued Indigenous land user agreement, indicating its importance to the Yued people.

Examples of heritage listed sites in the Yued region
Name	Reason for listing
Hasting's Cave	Contains artefacts, scatter, campsite
Karakin Lake	Women's gathering site, contains artefacts
Moore River	Water source, mythological importance due to the belief that it was created by the Noongar manifestation of Rainbow Serpent
Wedge Island Coast	Camp and hunting place, meeting place, water source

==== Flora and fauna ====
The Mediterranean to semi-arid climate of the Yued region formed unique flora and fauna that provided sustenance to the Yued people.

Examples of flora and fauna used by Yued people
Common name	Noongar name	Use
Grass tree	Balgar	Leaves used as shelter and torches
Native yam		Main source of food
Kerbein	Norn	White, fleshy part at the base of the stem is eaten. Evidence shows that this practice is still continued today.
Edible grubs	Bardi	Source of food
Berries: sandplain berries/golberries	Mull	Source of food

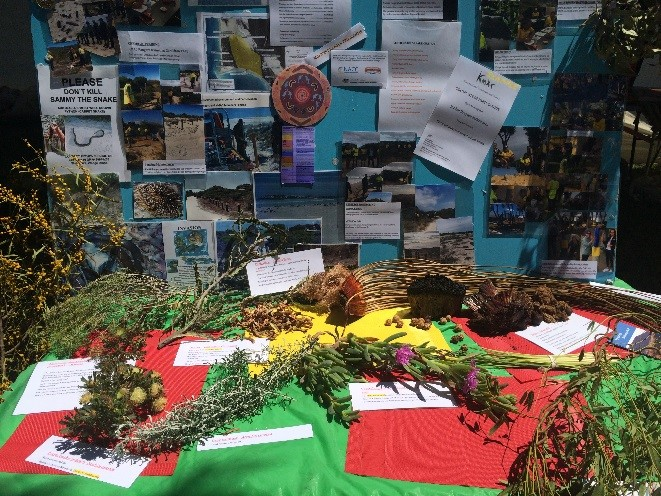
Traditional Yued bush food

== Culture ==
=== Mythological beliefs ===
A spirit that is central to the culture of Noongar people, and the Yued people, is the Rainbow Serpent. Whilst the mythological figure is common to many Aboriginal Australian cultures, in Noongar culture this deity is referred to as Waugal (alternatively spelt as Waakal, Waakle, Waagal and Wogal).

The significance of Waugal to the Yued people arise from their belief that the serpent created the Moore River, leading to the river to be referred to as a Dreaming track. The river was important for many activities of the Yued people, as a meeting, camping and birthing sites. There is common belief that the Waugal permanently resides in the deep river pools in the vicinity of the Moore River.

==== Daily activities ====
There is evidence to support that the Yued people moved seasonally during the pre-settlement era. They moved in the springtime, sourcing swamps and estuaries where freshwater turtles, frogs and other fauna provided plentiful food. These swamps and estuaries became a congregation point with the Amangu people during the summer and early autumn months where they camped and traded.

The Yued and other Noongar people engaged in trade, an activity which was dictated by the six Noongar seasons. The common trading place amongst the Noongar people is labelled as the Mandurah (a type of fair or meeting place), which facilitated good exchanges. The Yued people specialised in providing cutting and fighting tools in the Mandurah. Some of these include the dowak (a heavy stick used for hunting) and d-yuna (a stick used during wars).

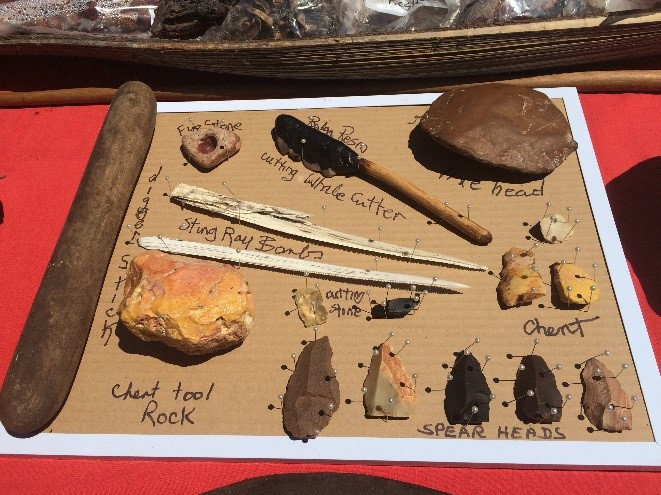
Tools used by the Yued people

=== Social hierarchy ===
The Yued Region followed a social hierarchy that included six classes or sections of people, with inheritance determined by the mother's division class. These classes, which also acted as family names, are:

- Tiraop
- N-Oiognok
- Palarop
- Tondorop
- Mondorop
- Jiragiok

Rules for marriage between classes were specific, with only certain classes being able marry into each other. For an example, individuals could not marry into the same class.

=== Culture during European settlement ===
Whilst cultural assimilation policies such as the taking of the Stolen Generations reduced cultural practices, some Yued people escaped to reserves and river sites where they could maintain elements of traditional lifestyle. One recorded practice included initiation ceremonies for young boys entering manhood.

== European settlement ==
The Yued region, like other Aboriginal cultures, underwent cultural shifts following the arrival of Europeans in Australia. The arrival of four Dutch trading fleets within the vicinity of Moore River between 1656 and 1658 has been identified as the earliest European visit to the Yued region. However, colonisation did not occur until Irish-born explorer and diarist George Fletcher Moore visited the Garban River in the Yued Region in 1836, later renamed Moore River after him.

Settlers attracted to the Yued region by its fertile land and steady growth of yam fields initially focused their pastoral work around two towns, Moora and Gingin, that they established. George Grey, governor of South Australia and New Zealand, noted that the region was a location where "more had been done here to secure a provision from the ground by hard manual labour than I could have believed it in the power of uncivilised man to accomplish". The first permanent settlers arrived in the region in 1846.

During this time, Yued people assisted explorers and settlers who were establishing themselves in Moora and Gingin by providing advice on land cultivation and helping them locate water, with some also finding employment on farming stations. However, Yued living conditions were soon compromised and they were often displaced from their land into the fringes of towns due to settler-introduced diseases, with many contracting syphilis, bronchitis and cyclical outbreaks of measles.

=== New Norcia ===
In 1845 a Catholic Missionary party led by Rosendo Salvado, a Spanish Benedictine monk, established themselves on the bank of Moore River. Salvado aimed to convert Aboriginal people and equip them with supposedly "Western" skills like farming without compromising their Indigenous identity. Salvado recruited Yued people from Gingin and Moora, providing them with housing and land to practise farming skills, and hiring some as mission employees. The community developed into the monastic town of New Norcia, a prominent town of the Yued region.

By 1847, some Yued people allowed their children to live with the monks. New Norcia Mission began housing and teaching young boys, as Salvado believed the centre could not cater to girls (a sentiment which was overturned in 1861). The mission gave Indigenous children a structured education, responsibilities through chores, and lessons in sport and musical instruments. To raise funds for the mission, Salvado picked five Yued children to take to Europe to showcase the successful conversion of "native" children to the courts of Europe. By 1858, 92 Aboriginal people (including 26 children) from Moora and Gingin resided in the New Norcia community.

Conflicts later arose within the New Norcia community, with Aboriginal residents resenting the lack of care due to the reduction of government subsidies and changing direction of the mission. In 1911, residents were encouraged to leave the mission, leading to some finding jobs on the outskirts of the Perth metropolitan area and others finding dwellings on the fringes of town.

=== Fringe dwelling ===
Soon, other Yued people joined the residents leaving New Norcia and establishing dwellings in the outskirts of towns such as Moora.

The 1905 Aborigines Act contained legislation to reduce interactions between Aboriginal people and settlers, and many Yued people created dwellings in the outskirts of town, called reserves. This led to the creation of Karramarra reserve by the state department in 1916. Other well-known reserves include Moora Reserve, Mogumber reserve and Walebing reserve, which became a permanent basis for Yued people after the break-up of Moora Camp in 1920. Due to the high concentration of these reserves near the district of Moora, it was established as the centre of Yued Region by its Aboriginal community. Last names of Aboriginal people who were pioneers of the Moora District include Jackamarra, Taylor, Spratt, Narrier, Anderson, Headland, Yappo, Warrell, Wyatt and Boota.

Living conditions within the camps were poor, with records stating that Aboriginal residents often came into town to beg for food and many townspeople complained about the lack of hygiene and the degree of feuding within these reserves. However, these camps facilitated a means for Yued people to maintain some traditions during times of government forced assimilation.

=== Development of settlement camps ===
In 1915 the Western Australian government established Carrolup settlement as a further instrument of its assimilation policies to segregate Aboriginal people from the wider community. This was followed in 1918 by Moore River settlement camp, constructed near Moore River. This camp held Aboriginal people from other groups residing in the Yued region as the facilities catered for 400 people from Gingin (a major town in Yued region) to Northampton including children from Murchison district.

During the 1960s, general rights and living conditions for Yued people improved due to the repeal of the 1905 Aborigines Act and the closure of settlement camps. Moora Shire Council approved the erection of transitional homes for Aboriginal families, reducing the need for fringe dwelling.

=== Unemployment ===
During much of the twentieth century the Yued region was characterised by high Aboriginal unemployment rates. Contributory factors included social racism and the strictures of 1905 Aborigines Act, which tried to confine Aboriginal people to the settlement camps, prevent their freedom to find jobs and reduce the land upon which they could farm.

Other factors which increased unemployment included increased competition due to increased immigration from southern Europe, and economic uncertainty created by the Great Depression. Many Yued people relied on government rations and small payments or "rewards" collected through conducting menial jobs for settlers such as collecting firewood in return for tobacco. Some also made an income through selling propsticks, a common object traded by Aboriginal people at the time. Records in 1970 show that of 260 Aboriginal people in Moora, only 35 were employed and approximately 100 others were in need of jobs.

=== Programs to resolve cultural issues ===
In 1980s, Yued leaders began to explore the idea of initiating vocational skills classes to resolve unemployment and the lack of cultural cohesion within the Yued community.

In 1985, Yued descendent Wendy Passamani initiated one of the first self-employment schemes for the Yued people in Moora. This course was designed for members to gain skills in spinning wool and using weaving frames and looms to produce textiles. Over time, interest in the program waned and it was shut down.

In 1986, cultural awareness programs in school, especially the St Joseph School were led by Yuat elder, Edward (Ned) Mippy, to reacquaint Yued children with their culture. Activities offered including teaching children the Yued language, recounts of Dreamtime stories and skills in bushcraft, using spears and boomerang.

==== Yuat artefacts workshop ====
In July 1986, the "Yued artefact workshop" was developed by Mippy. This workshop was held in Church Hall and taught adults in the Yued Community to handcraft artefacts such as boomerangs, spears, spear throwers, shields and traditional Yued-style huts called maya-maya. The name for the workshop was officiated as the "Yued Nyoongar Kaat Maya", meaning "Headquarters of the Yued people". The artefacts produced often facilitated monthly celebrations within the Yued community.

Commercial sales of the artefacts were made in local outlets including the Moora Service Station, Walebing Roadhouse and local arts and crafts exhibitions. The program received government funding by the Western Australian Department of Employment, Education & Training, and enrolled trainees had an official contract where they worked 20 hours a week in exchange for $150 weekly allowance.

The workshop was officiated in February 1990, with favourable reviews from the general community with an article published saying:

Aborigines in the Wheatbelt town of Moora ... are turning their hand to commerce and in the process discovering talents they did not realise they had. Four hours of classes a day teach them to make various artefacts from the area, including boomerangs, spear throwers, bullroarers, lizards, snakes, didgeridoos and 206 shields which they hope to sell at tourist outlets in and around Perth.

Mippy's death in 1992 and a later lack of funding initially left the future of the workshop uncertain. However, government funding revived, leading to a new building being created to facilitate the workshops in 1995. The workshops were praised as a form of cultural and economic empowerment for the Yued people, although they were criticised by some.

== Yued (1990 onwards) ==
Many more cultural preservation efforts have been initiated since the 1990s.

Examples of cultural preservation projects
Action	Impact
Native title	In 1997, the Noongar people made an initial application for six native titles in the Noongar area, including Yued. A native title is the official recognition that Aboriginal and Torres Strait Islander people have rights and interest to land-based on their traditions. It was only until 2018 the titles were registered. However, the settlement of the title is still under lengthy litigation and a final decision has not been made by the High Court as of November 2020. If the native title is agreed to, Yued land will reap benefits such as the development of a trust ("Noongar Boodja Trust") receiving yearly funds, Noongar cultural centre, land access to conduct customary activities and land trust of for $46,850,000 over ten years for land-related projects. Activities and land trust of for $46,850,000 over ten years for land-related projects.
Yued Aboriginal Astronomy Project	This is a tourism project developed to bring economic benefits and cultural awareness through Yued Dreamtime stories that highlight constellation. It is developed funded by the Australian Government Department of Social Services.
Ngala Wele Karla	A project to support Yued people starting businesses.

=== Aboriginal population according to 2016 census ===
According to the 2016 census, the Aboriginal population in the Yued region varied from 2–3% for most towns, with the exception of Moora where 13.4% of the population stated that they were Aboriginal.

== Sources ==
- Haebich, Anna (1988). For Their Own Good: Aborigines and Government in the South West of Western Australia 1900-1940. Nedlands: UWA Publishing. ISBN 978-0-85564-280-8. LCCN 89139671. OCLC 19964976. OL 2259057M. Wikidata Q136540470.
- Macintyre, Ken; Dobson, Barb. "The Puzzle of the Bardi Grub in Nyungar Culture". Anthropology from the Shed.
- Salvado, Rosendo (1977). Stormon, E. J. (ed.). The Salvado memoirs : historical memoirs of Australia and particularly of the Benedictine mission of New Norcia and of the habits and customs of the Australian natives. University of Western Australia Press. ISBN 978-0-855-64114-6.
- Tindale, Norman Barnett (1974). "Juat". Aboriginal Tribes of Australia: Their Terrain, Environmental Controls, Distribution, Limits, and Proper Names. Australian National University Press. ISBN 978-0-708-10741-6. Archived from the original on 20 March 2020.
