= Angus Wallam =

Australian writer (1926–2014)

- Born: 1926
- Died: October 2014 (aged 87–88)

Angus Wallam (1926 – October 2014) was a Noongar Aboriginal elder from Wagin, Western Australia. He received the Wagin Australia Day Citizenship Award for his work with Indigenous youth and community. He grew up at Marribank Mission (also known as Carrolup). He worked for farmers and contractors, built roads, and worked on the railway for 22 years. He has nine children and around 40 grandchildren.

== Published works ==
Corroboree (2004) is an autobiography of Wallam's childhood (written in collaboration with Suzanne Kelly; illustrated by Norma MacDonald; published by UWA Press)

It's springtime - Wirrin's favourite time of the year. As he sets about enjoying hunting with his father, collecting ochre with his grandfather, digging for sweet potato with his mother and gathering wattle seed with his grandmother, people are coming from far and wide for the big corroboree at which Wirrin will see all his cousins and dance the night away.

The book was a joint prize winner of the 1999 Marrwarning Award for Published and Unpublished books by Aboriginal and Torres Strait Islanders.

More of his memories and stories can be found in the publication Sort of a Place Like Home: Remembering the Moore River Native Settlement by Susan Maushart. and The Wailing: A National Black Oral History, by Stuart Rintoul, published by W. Heinemann Australia, 1 January 1993, and in a video interview with Robyn Smith Wally available on Vimeo.

Drawings and artwork done by children at the Carrolup Mission during the 1930s, including artworks by Angus Wallam, were displayed in an exhibition at Curtin University called Heart Coming Home or Koolark Koort Koorliny in August 2013. In May 2013 Angus Wallam and Ezzard Flowers, another Indigenous leader, signed a memorandum of understanding with the owner of the artworks, Colgate University, and Curtin University to house the artworks permanently at Curtin University on condition that they be made available for viewing by Noongar and other Indigenous students there.
