= Sharyn Egan =

Australian Nyoongar artist

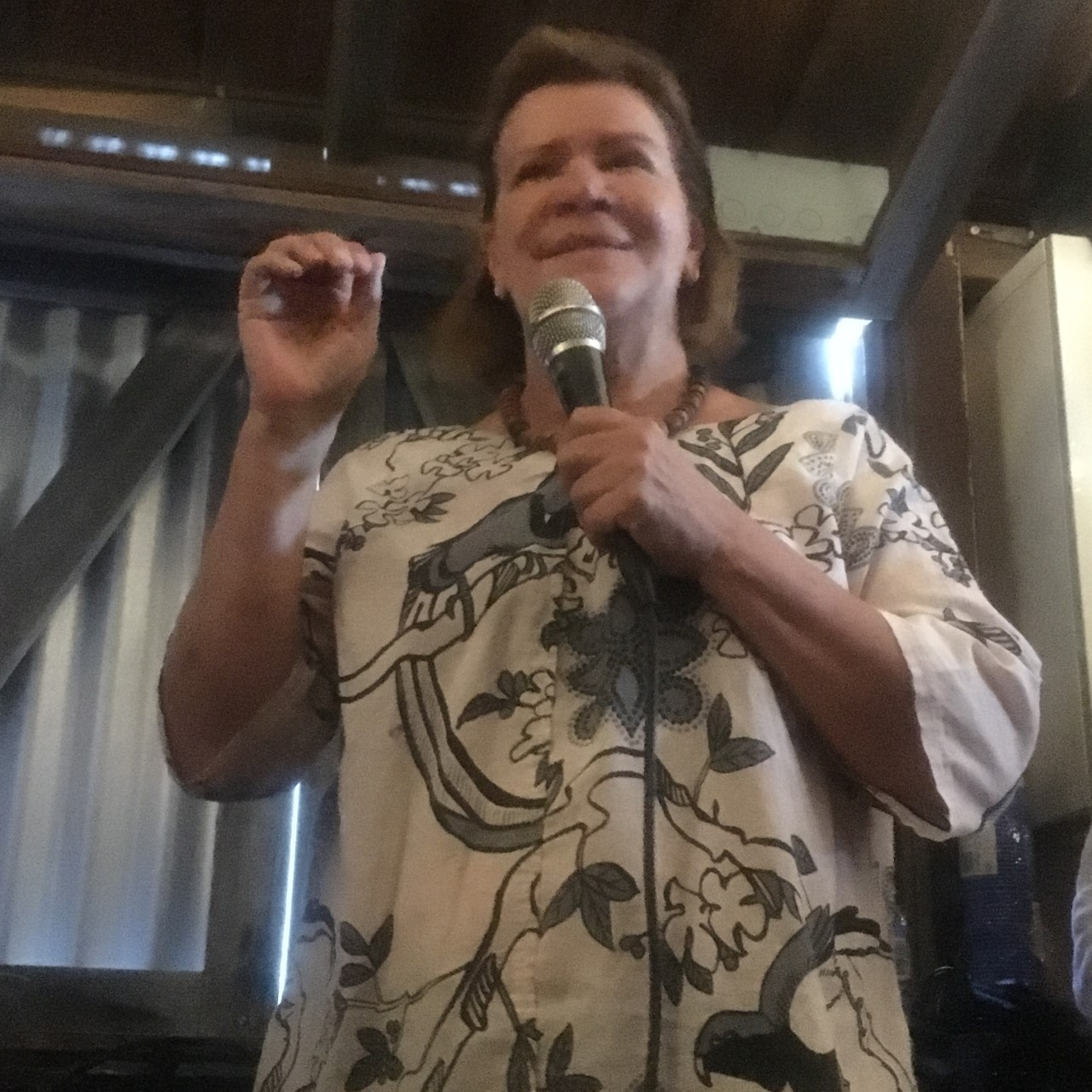
- Born: 1957 (age 68–69); Subiaco, Western Australia
- Education: Claremont School of Art (Perth); Curtin University of Technology; Kidogo Institute (Fremantle)

Sharyn Egan (born 1957) is a Nyoongar artist known for her work in painting, sculpture, weaving and walking. Based in Fremantle, Western Australia, Egan's works are held in the collections of the National Museum of Australia and the Berndt Museum of Anthropology, and she has created artworks for the Perth International Arts Festival.

== Early life ==
Egan was born in 1957 in Subiaco, Western Australia. One of the Stolen Generations, she was removed from her family at age three and placed in the New Norcia Mission until the age of 13. She was never reunited with her parents.

In 2007 she was one of the authors of a book on Australian art In the Mean Time.

In 2018 she was working with other artists on work that was to be based at the Blacktown Native Institution Site. The institution was responsible for educating Māori and Aboriginal children who had been taken, like Egan, from their families.

== Education ==
Egan reentered education at the age of 37 when she enrolled to study for a diploma at what is now the Central Institute of Technology. This took her from 1994 to 1998 in Perth and she then set out to gain an associate degree in art. This was completed by the millennium and the following year she received a graduate degree from Perth's Curtin University of Technology. Since then she has gone onto take post graduate qualifications in Cultural Tourism and Training and Assessment which she had completed by 2008.

== Respect, Recognition and Reconciliation ==
Egan has worked for many years in Fremantle, WA, making outdoor artworks, walks, interactive workshops and exhibitions in galleries such as Fremantle Art Centre. In 2023 City of Fremantle gave in principle support for a proposed public artwork in Kings Square by Egan and Simon Gilby, entitled Respect, Recognition and Reconciliation. They intend to invite 14 Noongar clans to share stones from their communities for the installation, which will also reference Noongar constellations and origin stories.

== Exhibitions ==
- 2023 - Sculpture at Bathers - Balga, three works made from straw, thread and synthetic wool, installed outdoors at Cottesloe Beach
- 2023 - Boorongur | Totem - interactive exhibition across Gallery 9 of the Art Gallery of New South Wales exploring multi-species relationships and care for environments where human and non-human species cohabit.
- 2022 - Sculpture at Bathers - Outdoor sculpture
- 2022 - Barangga Yarn - in conversation with Beau James at the University of Western Australia
- 2018 – Walyalup Water Walk a sensory walking tour in collaboration with Mei Saraswati and Matt Aiken featuring Koondarm Choir for Perth International Arts Festival.
- 2016 – Woven sculptures for Sculpture by the Sea, Perth.
