= Gina Williams =

Australian musician

Gina Williams AM
- Born: Western Australia
- Origin: Western Australia
- Occupations: Singer; songwriter; author
- Instrument: Vocals
- Years active: 2000–present
- Label: Gina Williams
- Website: www.ginawilliams.com.au

Gina Williams AM is an Australian singer-songwriter from Western Australia. Williams has released five studio albums and is the recipient of seven West Australian Music Industry Awards.

== Early life ==
Williams is a Ballardong, Noongar woman, one of the 14 clan groups which make up the Noongar nation, with links through her grandmother’s line to the Kija people of the East Kimberley.

Williams's parents and grandmother were both part of the Stolen Generations and were never allowed to speak their languages. Williams recalls her parents saying "you have lovely olive skin because of your Indian or Malay heritage", which was not true.

Williams's mother was an alcoholic, in and out of her life since she was eight, and her father died a few days after Gina's 12th birthday. Gina was placed in foster care and was soon adopted. In 2013, Williams reflected saying "I grew up not knowing anything about my true history. I've had to go back as an adult and learn. I don't regret this, but it means I've had to claw territory back. I wanted to learn the language, to write songs so that I could teach my children. It's an incredibly beautiful language – when I hear Noongar language I hear music, it literally sings to me."

Williams said that as a child "I wanted to be Sarah Vaughan when I grew up and to marry Nat King Cole".

== Career ==
=== 2000–2010: solo albums ===
In 2001, Williams won her first West Australian Music Industry Awards (WAMI) for Indigenous Song of the Year. In 2003, she won Most Popular Local Original Indigenous Act.

In 2009, Williams was a headline artist, for International Women’s Day in Newman, for WA Business Arts Partnership Awards in Perth and City of Perth Christmas Festival.

The same year, at age 40, Williams enrolled into a Noongar language course at TAFE. She wrote her first song in Balladong "Iggy's Lullaby" while studying and pregnant with her third child.

Later in 2009, Williams wrote a song, incorporating the elements of a Welcome to Country. The intent of the song, "Wanjoo" (Welcome), was to be used by Williams and her children. She asked her language teacher to check and correct, and the teacher loved it which led to Williams teaching it to her classmates.

In 2010, Williams performed a cabaret, telling her own and her people's stories in Gina Williams and the Lubbly Sings.

=== 2011–present: collaborations with Guy Ghouse ===
Circa 2010, Williams started working with guitarist Guy Ghouse AM (1969-2025), an Australian of Chinese and Indian descent, born in Perth and raised in the Kimberley.

In 2014, Williams and Ghouse and released Kalyakoorl (Noongar for "Forever"). The album was recorded, mixed and mastered at Crank Studios with Lee Buddle and featured Russell Holmes (Piano), Roy Martinez (Bass), Arun Satgunasingam (Percussion) and introduces Gina's daughters Lauren and Bella McGill (backing vocals). The album was sung entirely in Noongar.

In 2018, Williams and Ghouse released their second collaborative album Bindi Bindi (Noongar for "The Butterfly"). The album was once again recorded, mixed and mastered at Crank Studios with Lee Buddle. Stephen Bevis from The West Australian said "this landmark album is a triumph. Singer-songwriter Gina Williams and guitarist Guy Ghouse have laid down an important steppingstone in what will hopefully be an irresistible and sustained renaissance in Noongar language and culture...But this is not only an important cultural document – it is a plain lovely musical gem...4.5 stars..."

Also in 2018, Gina Williams and Guy Ghouse signed a worldwide publishing agreement with Perfect Pitch Publishing.

The duo's third collaboration Koorlangka (Noongar for "Children/Legacy") was released in February 2020. Once again, this album was recorded on Noongar country (Perth), and mixed and mastered at Crank Studios with Lee Buddle. Hayden Davis from Pilerats said "Koorlangka [is] a collection of old-fashioned lullabies and children's songs performed in the Noongar language, modernising classic tales from both Indigenous and Anglo-Saxon backgrounds and adapting them for Indigenous Australia; Williams' vocal moving between Noongar and English as twinkling instrumentals from Guy Ghouse, acoustically backing the soothing and comforting vocal of Williams as it swirls and dances around."

In 2021, Williams released her first book, Wanjoo, featuring illustrations from students at Ashfield Primary School in Perth.

Also in 2021, Williams and Ghouse published, through Magabala Books (Indigenous publishing house based in Broome, Western Australia), their first music book for voice, guitar and piano, "Kalyakoorl, ngalak warangka" (Forever, we sing). October also saw another step in the continued renaissance in Noongar language and culture with a sellout WA Opera season performing the Noongar Opera Koolbardi Wer Wardong, a story of Koolbardi the Magpie and Wardong the Crow.

Williams and Ghouse continue to host free interactive community music and language workshops featuring storytelling, music and collective singing.

Ghouse died of cancer in 2025.

=== Honorary positions ===
Williams was appointed a Member of the Order of Australia for "significant service to the performing arts, to Indigenous music, and to media" in the 2021 Queen's Birthday Honours.

Board of Directors, Australian Music Centre, 2021–present

Williams and Ghouse accepted an invitation in 2021 to be the inaugural patrons of Perth's first cabaret festival, the Perth International Cabaret Festival.

== Discography ==
=== Albums ===
List of albums, with release date and label shown
Title	Details
Into the Night	Released: 2002; Label: Gina Williams (PHGINAW001); Formats: CD
Brilliant Blue	Released: 2004; Label: Gina Williams (PHGINAW002); Formats: CD,
Kalyakoorl (with Guy Ghouse)	Released: 2014; Label: Gina Williams & Guy Ghouse (GWGG001); Formats: CD, digital download
Bindi Bindi (with Guy Ghouse)	Released: April 2018; Label: Gina Williams & Guy Ghouse; Formats: CD, digital download
Koorlangka (with Guy Ghouse)	Released: February 2020; Label: Gina Williams & Guy Ghouse; Formats: CD, digital download
Koort (with Guy Ghouse)	Released: April 2022; Label: Gina Williams & Guy Ghouse; Formats: CD

== Awards and nominations ==
=== WAMIS ===
The West Australian Music Industry Awards are annual awards presented to the local contemporary music industry, put on annually by the Western Australian Music Industry Association Inc (WAM). Williams has won seven awards.

Year	Nominee / work	Award	Result (wins only)
2001	Indigenous Song of the Year	Rainy Tuesday Wedding	Won
2003	Most Popular Local Original Indigenous Act	herself	Won
2013	Best Indigenous Act	herself	Won
2014	Best Indigenous Act	herself (with Guy Ghouse)	Won
2015	Best Indigenous Act	herself (with Guy Ghouse)	Won
2016	Best Indigenous Act	herself	Won
2018	Best Indigenous Act	herself (with Guy Ghouse)	Won

=== West Australian of the Year Awards ===
The West Australian of the Year Awards recognise Western Australians making significant contributions in key areas such as arts and culture; the Aboriginal community; positive social, scientific and economic impact; sport and the WA community as a whole.

Year	Nominee/work	Award	Result
2017	Herself	Aboriginal Category	Won

=== Western Australia Women Hall of Fame ===
The Western Australian Women's Hall of Fame was first established in recognition of the Centenary of International Women's Day’s Day held annually since 2011.

Year	Nominee / work	Award	Result
2018	herself	Hall of Fame	inductee
