= Noongarpedia =

Project to add Noongar content to Wikimedia projects

Noongarpedia is a collaborative project to add Noongar language content to Wikimedia projects and to improve all languages' content relating to Noongar topics. It is being driven by an Australian Research Council project from the University of Western Australia and Curtin University, in collaboration with Wikimedia Australia. The goal of the project is to establish a Noongar language Wikipedia.

== See also ==
- Freopedia
