= Eddie Bennell =

Australian playwright, prose writer and boxer (1939–1991)

Edward James Bennell (1939 – 18 January 1991) was an Australian playwright, prose writer and boxer.

He was born Edward James Bennell in 1939, near Brookton, to Edward James Bennell and Elsie May Bennell (née Bolton), and Eddie was the youngest in a family of three brothers (Brain, Avon, Wayne) and one sister (Nancy). Eddie lived on an aboriginal mission on the outskirts of Brookton in his youth.

Eddie married Rhonda Sully (now Winmar). They lived their early years on the mission outside of Brookton, having two girls Tracy and May. A few years later they moved the family near "the big smoke"(Perth), staying in Maylands first. Then having Olman, Eddie, and Maxine. In the mid-1980s, while living in Gosnells, two more children were to complete the immediate family Allan and Kirsty (adopted).

Eddie and his father Edward took "dog tags" to be able to move around a bit more to get a job in the hope of advancing their families and relations lives. He was close to his uncle Jack Davis, an aboriginal playwright of the 1980s. Jack was a large influence on Eddie's playwriting future.

In 1974, he served as the inaugural chairman of the National Aboriginal Commission, in Canberra.

He died on 18 January 1991, aged 51 or 52, at Sir Charles Gardiner Hospital. Eddie's last place living with his family was Coolbellup. in Fremantle.

== Bibliography ==
Bennell published 22 works in his life, including the following:

- 1975: Whither the Aborigines and the N.A.C
- 1980: Aboriginal legends from the Bibulmun tribe (translated into Chinese in 1983)
- 1990: The silent years
- Flight of an Eagle
- Waargle
- 1993: My Spiritual Dreaming
