= Ballardong =

Indigenous people of Western Australia

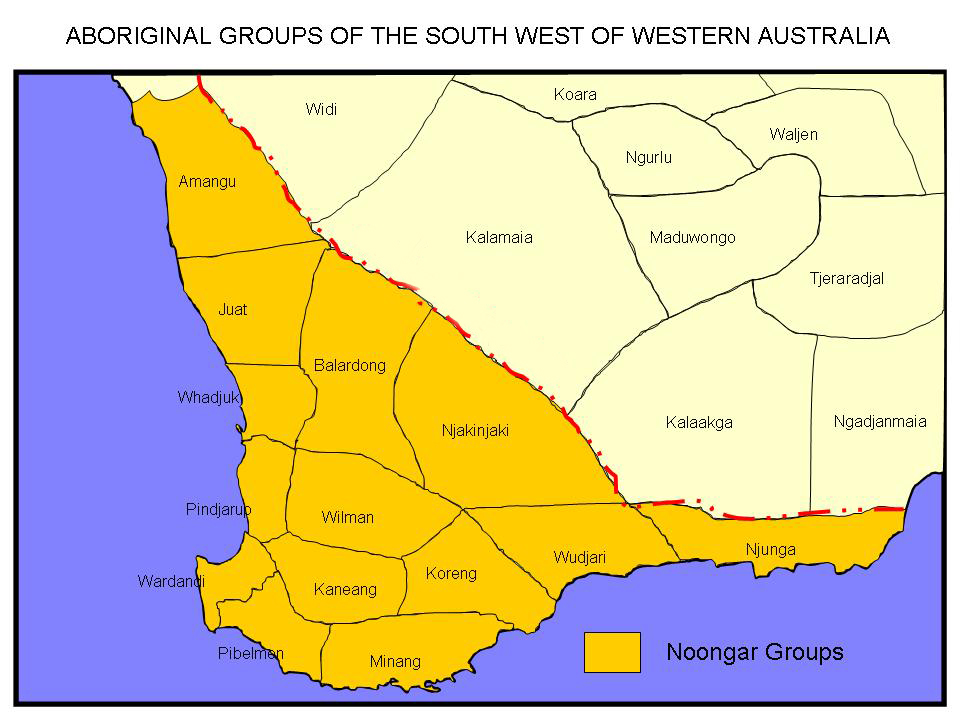
Noongar language groups

Ballardong are an indigenous Noongar people of the south western area of Western Australia.

== Country ==
The Ballardong's land encompasses an estimated 10,500 square miles (27,000 km^{2}). Northwards they occupy the Avon River. From the east of York they extend to Tammin, Kununoppin, Waddouring Hill, Bencubbin, Toodyay, Goomalling, and the Wongan Hills. On their southern flank lies Pingelly and Wickepin. Their western frontier is at the Darling Scarp.

== Economy ==
The Ballardong engaged in mining, quarrying stones to be shaped and sharpened for knives and multibarbed spears at Kalannie.

== Alternative names ==
- Balardong
- Balladong, Ballardon
- Ballerdokking
- Boijangura, Boyangoora, Booyungur (hill people)
- Maiawongi (language name)
- Minang ("south", used by the Kalamaia of the Ballardong and other southern tribes' languages), Boyangoora, Booyungur
- Mudila, Mudilja, Mudi:a (general Kalamaia exonym for the Ballardong and other uncircumcised tribes to their southwest)
- Toode-nunjer (a coastal exonym for the Ballardong, properly, Tu:denyunga (Toodyay men))
- Waljuk
- Warranger
- Warrangul, Warrangle ("koala country"; ethnonym also applied to the Koreng)

== Language ==
- chungar (brown man)
- doorda (tame dog)
- maman (father)
- unkan (mother)
- yockine (wild dog)

Source: Hackett 1886, p. 344

== Sources ==
- "AIATSIS map of Indigenous Australia". AIATSIS.
- Gilchrist, J. (1886). "The Perth Tribe" (PDF). In Curr, Edward Micklethwaite (ed.). The Australian race: its origin, languages, customs, place of landing in Australia and the routes by which it spread itself over the continent. Vol. 1. Melbourne: J. Ferres. pp. 332–335.
- Hackett, D.E. (1886). "The York District" (PDF). In Curr, Edward Micklethwaite (ed.). The Australian race: its origin, languages, customs, place of landing in Australia and the routes by which it spread itself over the continent. Vol. 1. Melbourne: J. Ferres. pp. 342–345.
- Nind, Scott (1831). "Description of the Natives of King George's Sound (Swan River Colony) and Adjoining Country". Journal of the Royal Geographical Society of London. 1: 21–51. doi:10.2307/1797657. JSTOR 1797657.
- "Tindale Tribal Boundaries" (PDF). Department of Aboriginal Affairs, Western Australia. September 2016. Archived from the original (PDF) on 8 March 2016.
- Tindale, Norman Barnett (1974). "Balardong (WA)". Aboriginal Tribes of Australia: Their Terrain, Environmental Controls, Distribution, Limits, and Proper Names. Australian National University. Archived from the original on 20 March 2020.
