= Noongar =

Group of Aboriginal peoples of southwestern Australia

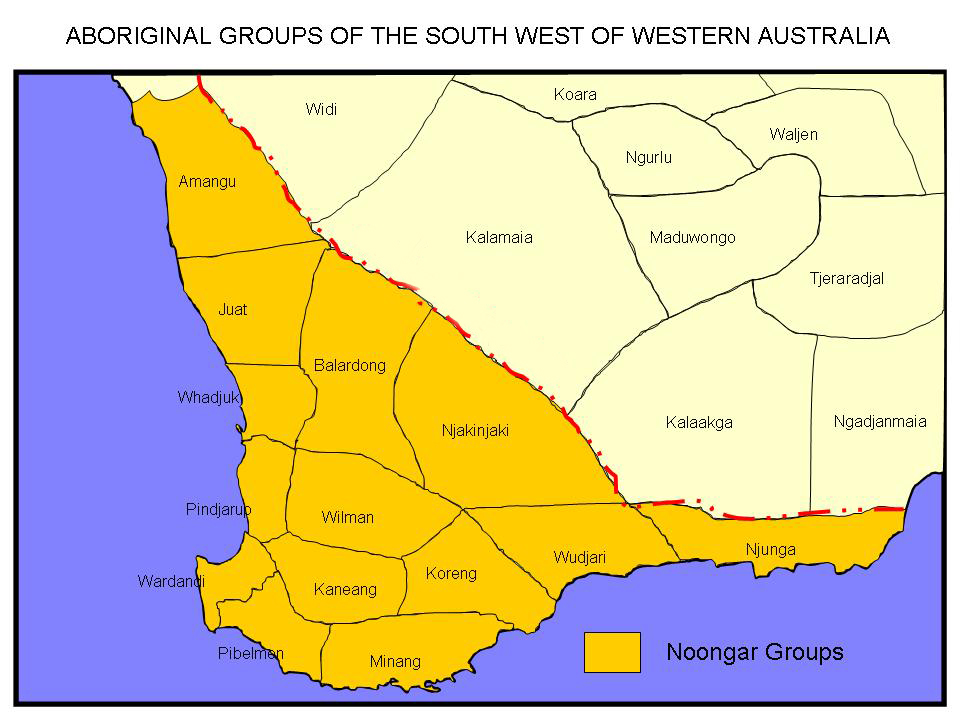
Noongar groups

The Noongar (/ˈnʊŋɑːr/, also spelt Noongah, Nyungar /ˈnjʊŋɑːr/, Nyoongar, Nyoongah, Nyungah, Nyugah, and Yunga /ˈjʊŋɑː/) are Aboriginal Australian people who live in the south-west corner of Western Australia, from Geraldton on the west coast to Esperance on the south coast. There are 14 different groups in the Noongar cultural bloc: Amangu, Ballardong, Yued, Kaneang, Koreng, Mineng, Njakinjaki, Njunga, Pibelmen, Pindjarup, Wadandi, Whadjuk, Wiilman and Wudjari. (Note: Contemporary usage tends to aggregate these into three major sub-identities: (1) the Wardandi of the coastal zone from Augusta to Bunbury; (2) the Pindjarup (Binjarub) from north Bunbury to Mandurah and Pinjarra, both coastally and inland; and (3) the Perth metropolitan and surrounding area's Whadjuk.) The Noongar people refer to their land as Noongar boodja. (Note: Boodja, sometimes spelt Boodjar, is the Noongar word for 'country'.)

The members of the collective Noongar cultural bloc descend from people who spoke several languages and dialects that were often mutually intelligible. What is now classified as the Noongar language is a member of the large Pama–Nyungan language family. Contemporary Noongar speak Australian Aboriginal English laced with Noongar words and occasionally inflected by its grammar. Most contemporary Noongar trace their ancestry to one or more of these groups. In the 2011 Australian census, 10,549 people identified as Indigenous in the south-west of Western Australia. By 2021, this number had increased to 14,355.

== Name ==
The endonym of the Noongar comes from a word originally meaning 'man' or 'person'.

== Language ==
At the time of European settlement, it is believed that the peoples of what became the Noongar community spoke thirteen dialects, of which five still have speakers with some knowledge of their respective versions of the language. No speakers use it over the complete range of everyday speaking situations, and the full resources of the language are available only to a few individuals.

== Ecological context ==
The Noongar peoples have six seasons: Djeran, Makuru, Djilba, Kambarang, Binak, and Bunuru, whose timing is defined by specific observable changes to the environment; a dry period may vary from as few as three to as many as eleven months. (Note: The contemporary Noongar calendar divides the year into six seasons: Binak (December–January): Bunuru (February–March); Djeran (April–May), Makuru; Djilba and Kambarang.) Tribes are spread over three different geological systems: the coastal plains, the plateau, and the plateau margins — areas characterized by relatively infertile soil. Casuarina, acacia, and melaleuca thickets predominate in the north, and the south by mulga scrubland, but it also supports dense forest stands. Several rivers run to the coast, and lakes and wetlands provided the Noongar people with their distinctive food and flora.

Generally, Noongar survived by hunting and trapping a variety of game, including kangaroos, possums and wallabies; people close to the coastal zone or riverine systems, spearfished and culled fish in traps. An extensive range of edible wild plants were also available, including yams and wattle seeds. Nuts of the zamia palm, eaten during the Djeran season (April–May) required extensive treatment to remove their toxicity. While there has been some speculation that women may have used them as a form of contraception, there is no direct evidence to support this claim.

== History of contact ==
Before the arrival of Europeans, the Noongar population has been variously estimated at between 6,000 and some tens of thousands. Colonisation by the British brought both violence and new diseases, taking a heavy toll on the population. The Noongar, like many other Aboriginal peoples, saw the arrival of Europeans as the returning of deceased people, often imagining them as relatives who deserved accommodation. As they approached from the west, the newcomers were called djaanga (or djanak), meaning 'white spirits'.

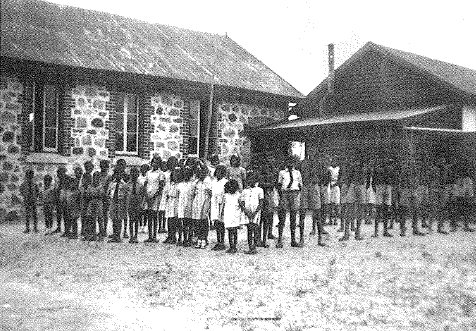
Carrolup River Native Settlement, c. 1951, near Katanning

Initially, relations were generally cordial. Matthew Flinders recognised the success of his three-week sojourn as due in good part to Noongar diplomacy, and Noongar rituals celebrated their reception of the newcomers in a ceremonial form. (Note: "The south-west corner of Western Australia provides a rare and celebrated instance of harmonious interaction that had lasting consequences. In King George Sound, explorers and early colonists owed the success of their missions to Nyungar traditions of diplomacy and hospitality. In 1803, Matthew Flinders had his marines perform a military salute to honour the Nyungar for their assistance over a three-week rest period [...]. For at least half a century or longer, the Nyungar would enact a variation of this ceremony, with Aboriginal men assembled in rows, military-style, with white pipe clay and red crosses painted on their chests, with sticks as guns — mimicking the 'redcoats'. By the early 1900s, however, this branch of the Nyungar clan had become extinct, victims of colonial expansion from the Swan River penal settlement and also of introduced diseases.") When settlement became more firmly established, however, misunderstandings over the obligations of reciprocity – some of the most productive land was being taken, especially on the Upper Swan – led to sporadic clashes. An example of such misunderstandings was the Noongar land-management practice of setting fires in early summer, mistakenly seen as an act of hostility by the settlers. Conversely, the Noongar saw the settlers' livestock as fair game to replace the dwindling stocks of native animals shot indiscriminately by settlers. The only area that successfully resisted the usurpation of native land for any time was the area around the Murray River, which effectively blocked expansion of the tiny settlement at Mandurah for almost half a decade.

In June 1832, a Whadjuk leader, Yagan, formerly of good standing among the settler authorities and known in the colony for his handsome bearing, "tall, slender and well-fashioned ... of pleasing countenance", was, together with his father Midgegooroo and brother Monday, declared an outlaw after undertaking a series of food raids and a retaliatory murder. Caught and imprisoned, he escaped and was let alone, as though informally reprieved as a native version of William Wallace. (Note: Yagan's brother Monday later deposed that their resistance stemmed from the many deaths the Whadjuk had suffered and their loss of access to elementary means of survival. "He stated that the number of men belonging to his tribe that were killed several times since we came to the settlement to be 16. Gave a most particular catalogue of the names, places & manner of death, & by whom killed, whether by soldier or otherwise. He complained greatly of our encroachments and interference; that they were straightened for subsistence, treated with rudeness, & prevented from walking with liberty in their own country.") His father was caught and killed without trial by a military firing squad. Yagan himself, with a bounty on his head, was ambushed soon afterwards by an 18-year-old settler youth, after he had stopped two settlers and asked for flour. His corpse was decapitated, and the head was sent to England for display in fairgrounds. (Note: Yagan's head was returned and given proper burial in 2010, 177 years after his death.) Yagan is now considered a Noongar hero, by many to have been one of the first Indigenous resistance fighters. Matters escalated with conflicts between the settlement of Thomas Peel and the Pindjarup people, resulting in the Pinjarra massacre. Similarly, struggles with Ballardong people in the Avon Valley continued until violently suppressed by Lieutenant Henry William St Pierre Bunbury. Notwithstanding this violence, extraordinary acts of goodwill existed. In the same year, 1834, the Swan River Noongar couple, Migo and Molly Dobbin, alerted to the fact a European child had gone missing, covered 35 kilometres (22 mi) in 10 hours tracking his spoors, and saved him, at the point of death.

From August 1838, ten Aboriginal prisoners were sent to Rottnest Island (Wadjemup, possibly meaning 'place across the water'). After a short period when both settlers and prisoners occupied the island, the Colonial Secretary announced in June 1839 that the island would become a penal establishment for Aboriginal people and was officially designated as such in 1841. From that time until 1903, when the Indigenous section was closed, Rottnest Island was used as a prison to transfer Aboriginal prisoners "overseas". To "pacify" the Aboriginal population, men were rounded up and chained for offences ranging from spearing livestock, burning the bush, or digging vegetables on what had been their own land. It quickly became a "place of torment, deprivation and death", and it has been estimated that there may be as many as 369 Aboriginal graves on the island, of which five were for prisoners who had been hanged. Except for a short period between 1849 and 1855, during which the prison was closed, some 3,700 Aboriginal men and boys, many of them Noongars, but also many others from all parts of the state, were imprisoned.

A notable incident for the Noongar people in the Western Australian Colony was the arrival of Rosendo Salvado in 1846. Salvado was an advocate for the humane treatment of the Australian Aboriginals at the mission he created at New Norcia, in the territory of the Yued. He provided refuge for the Njunga and he defended many on charges of theft, arguing from church doctrine that theft was not criminal if dictated by dire necessity. While intent on converting, he encouraged the Noongars to maintain their traditional culture.

From 1890 to 1958, the lives and lifestyles of Noongar people were subject to the Native Welfare Act. By 1915, 15% of Perth's Noongar had been thrust north and interned at the Moore River Native Settlement. Carrolup (later known as Marribank) became the home of up to one-third of the population. It is estimated that 10 to 25% of Noongar children were forcibly adopted during these years, in part of what has become known as the Stolen Generations.

== Culture ==
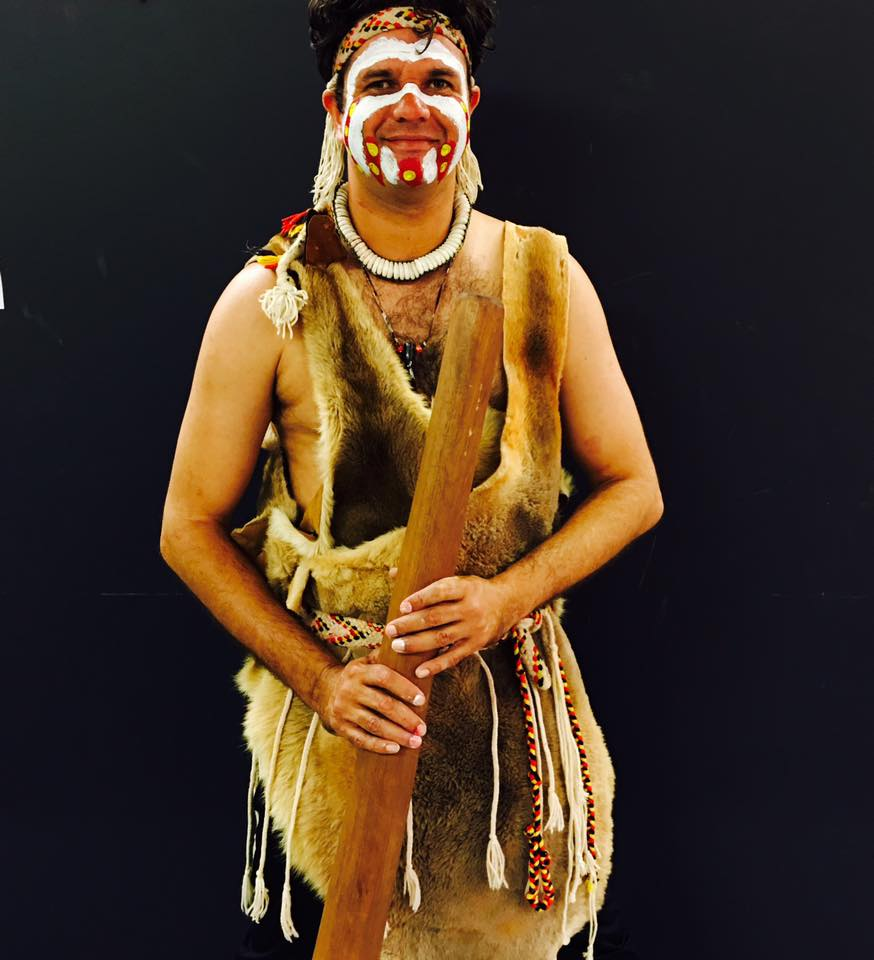
Olman Walley, a Noongar performer, in traditional Noongar clothing

Noongar people live in many country towns throughout the south-west as well as in the major population centres of Perth, Mandurah, Bunbury, Geraldton, Albany and Esperance. Many country Noongar people have developed long-standing relationships with non-Noongar farmers and continue to hunt kangaroo and gather bush tucker (food) as well as teach their children stories about the land. In a few areas in the south-west, visitors can go on bush tucker walks, trying foods such as kangaroo, emu, quandong jam or relish, bush tomatoes, witchetty grub pâté and bush honey.

The buka is a traditional cloak of the Noongar people made of kangaroo skin.

The kodj ("to be hit on the head") or kodja is a Noongar hafted axe. Kojonup, Western Australia and The Kodja Place visitor centre, in Kojonup, are named after the kodj.

In Perth, the Noongar believe that the Darling Scarp is said to represent the body of a Wagyl, a snakelike Dreamtime creature that is a common deity in Noongar culture, that meandered over the land creating rivers, waterways, and lakes. It is thought that the Wagyl created the Swan River. The Wagyl has been associated with Wonambi naracoutensis, part of the extinct megafauna of Australia that disappeared between 15 and 50,000 years ago.

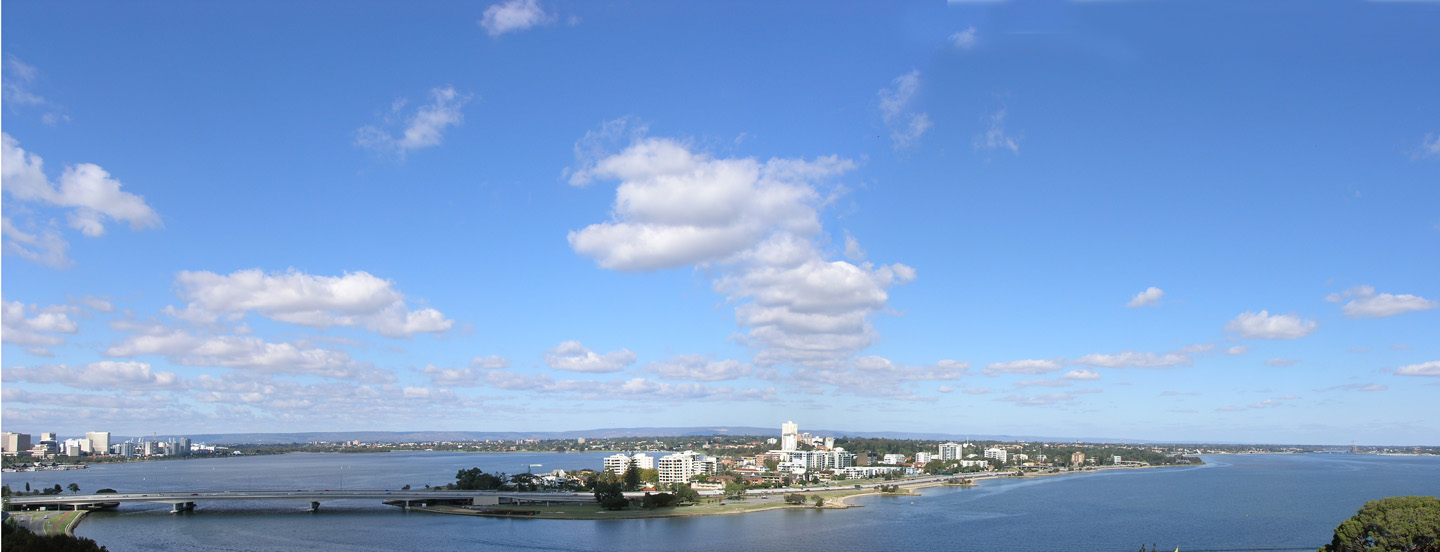
The Swan River

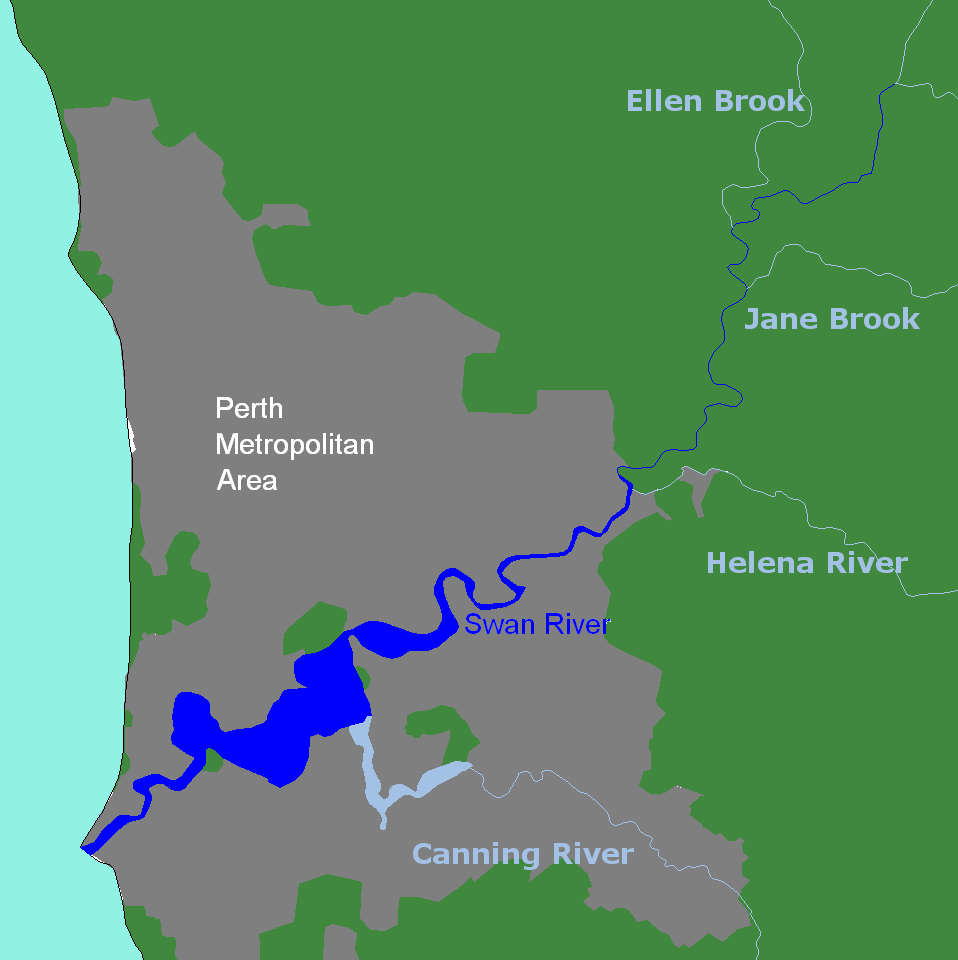
Swan River, with Canning River in light blue

Also in Perth, Mount Eliza was an important site for the Noongar. It was a hunting site where kangaroos were herded and driven over the edge to provide meat for gathering clans. In this context, the "clan" is a local descent group – larger than a family but based on family links through common ancestry. At the base of Mount Eliza is a sacred site where the Wagyl is said to have rested during its journeys. This site is also the location of the former Swan Brewery which has been a source of contention between local Noongar groups (who would like to see the land, which was reclaimed from the river in the late 19th century, "restored" to them) and the title-holders who wished to develop the site. A Noongar protest camp existed here for several years in the late 1990s and early 2000s.

Noongar culture is particularly strong with the written word. The plays of Jack Davis are on the school syllabus in several Australian states. Davis' first full-length play Kullark, a documentary on the history of Aboriginals in WA, was first produced in 1979. Other plays include: No Sugar, The Dreamers, Barungin: Smell the Wind, In Our Town and for younger audiences, Honey Spot and Moorli and the Leprechaun. Kim Scott won the 2000 Miles Franklin Award for his novel Benang and the 2011 award for That Deadman Dance.

Yirra Yaakin describes itself as the response to the Aboriginal community's need for positive self-enhancement through artistic expression. It is a theatre company that strives for community development and which also has the drive to create "exciting, authentic and culturally appropriate indigenous theatre".

Many local governments in the southwest have developed "compacts" or "commitments" with their local Noongar communities to ensure that sites of significance are protected and that the culture is respected. At the same time, the Western Australian Barnett government, also from November 2014, had been forcing the Aboriginal Cultural Material Committee to deregister 300 Aboriginal sacred sites in Western Australia. Although falling most heavily upon Pilbara and Kimberley sites this government policy also was having an impact on Noongar lands according to Ira Hayward-Jackson, Chairman of the Rottnest Island Deaths Group. The changes also removed rights of notification and appeal for traditional owners seeking to protect their heritage. A legal ruling on 1 April 2015 overturned the government's actions on some of the sites deregistered which were found to be truly sacred.

Elders are increasingly asked on formal occasions to provide a "Welcome to Country", and the first steps of teaching the Noongar language in the general curriculum have been made.

In recent years there has been considerable interest in Noongar visual arts. In 2006, Noongar culture was showcased as part of the Perth International Arts Festival. A highlight of the Festival was the unveiling of the monumental "Ngallak Koort Boodja – Our Heart Land Canvas". The 8-metre (26 ft) canvas was commissioned for the festival by representatives of the united elders and families from across the Noongar nation. It was painted by leading Noongar artists Shane Pickett, Tjyllyungoo, Yvonne Kickett, Alice Warrell and Sharyn Egan.

October 2021 saw the opening of the first Noongar opera Koolbardi wer Wardong. Written by Gina Williams and Guy Ghouse, the opera was performed at His Majesty's Theatre by members of West Australian Opera, West Australian Young Voices, Noongar Children's Choir and the Western Australian Youth Orchestra.

== Noongar ecology ==
=== Regions ===
The Noongar people occupied and maintained the Mediterranean climate lands of the south-west ecoregion of Western Australia, and made sustainable use of seven biogeographic regions of their territory, namely:

- Geraldton Sandplains – Amangu and Yued
- Swan Coastal Plain – Yued, Whadjuk, Binjareb and Wardandi
- Avon Wheatbelt – Balardong, Nyakinyaki, Wilman
- Jarrah Forest – Whadjuk, Binjareb, Balardong, Wilman, Ganeang
- Warren – Bibbulmun/Bibulmun, Mineng
- Mallee – Wilmen, Goreng and Wudjari
- Esperance Plains – Njunga

These seven regions have been acknowledged as a biodiversity hot-spot, having a generally greater number of endemic species than most other regions in Australia. The ecological damage done to this region through clearing, introduced species, by feral animals and non-endemic plants is also severe, and has resulted in a high proportion of plants and animals being included in the categories of rare, threatened and endangered species. In modern times many Aboriginal men were employed intermittently as rabbiters, and rabbit became an important part of Noongar diet in the early 20th century. The Noongar territory also happens to conform closely with the south-west Indian Ocean Drainage Region, and the use of these water resources played a very important seasonal part in their culture.

=== Seasons ===
The Noongar thus have a close connection with the earth and, as a consequence, they divided the year into six distinct seasons that corresponded with moving to different habitats and feeding patterns based on seasonal foods. They are:

- Birak (December/January) – Dry and hot. Noongar burned sections of scrubland to force animals into the open for easier hunting.
- Bunuru (February/March) – Hottest part of the year, with sparse rainfall throughout.
- Djeran (April/May) – Cooler weather begins. Fishing continued and bulbs and seeds were collected for food.
- Makuru (June/July) – Cold fronts that have until now brushed the lower south-west coast begin to cross further north. This is usually the wettest part of the year.
- Djilba (August/September) – Often the coldest part of the year, with clear, cold nights and days, or warmer, rainy and windy periods.
- Kambarang (October/November) – A definite warming trend is accompanied by longer dry periods and fewer cold fronts crossing the coast. The height of the wildflower season.

== Native title ==
On 19 September 2006 the Federal Court of Australia brought down a judgment which recognised native title in an area over the city of Perth and its surrounds, known as Bennell v State of Western Australia [2006] FCA 1243. An appeal was subsequently lodged and was heard in April 2007. The remainder of the larger "Single Noongar Claim" area, covering 193,956 km^{2} (74,887 sq mi) of the south-west of Western Australia, remains outstanding, and will hinge on the outcome of this appeal process. In the interim, the Noongar people together will continue to be involved in native title negotiations with the Government of Western Australia, and are represented by the South West Aboriginal Land and Sea Council.

Justice Wilcox's judgment is noteworthy for several reasons. It highlights Perth's wealth of post-European settlement writings which provide an insight into Aboriginal life, including laws and customs, around the time of settlement in 1829 and also into the beginning of the last century. These documents enabled Justice Wilcox to find that laws and customs governing land throughout the whole Single Noongar Claim (taking in Perth, and many other towns in the greater South West) were those of a single community. The claimants shared a language and had extensive interaction with others in the claim area.

Importantly, Justice Wilcox found the Noongar community constituted a united society which had continued to exist despite the disruption resulting from mixed marriage and people being forced off their land and dispersed to other areas as a result of white settlement and later Government policies.

In April 2008 the Full Bench of the Federal Court upheld parts of the appeal by the Western Australian and Commonwealth governments against Justice Wilcox's judgment.

Other native title claims on Noongar lands include:

- Gnaala Karla Booja: the headwaters of the Murray and Harvey Rivers to the Indian Ocean
- The Harris Family: The coasts of the area from Busselton to Augusta
- The South West Boojarah: Lower course of the Blackwood and adjacent coastal areas
- Southern Noongar Wagyl Kaip: The South Coast to the Blackwood Tributaries
- The Ballardong Lands: The interior Wheatbelt.

== Economics ==
Since the Noongar are largely urbanised or concentrated in major regional towns, studies have shown that the direct economic impact of the Noongar community on the WA economy was estimated to range between five and seven hundred million dollars per year. Exit polls of tourists leaving Western Australia have consistently shown that "lack of contact with indigenous culture" has been their greatest regret. It has been estimated that this results in the loss of many millions of dollars of foregone tourist revenue.

== Current issues ==
As a consequence of the Stolen Generations and problems integrating with modern westernised society, many difficult issues face the present day Noongar. For example, the Noongar Men of the SouthWest gathering in 1996 identified major community problems associated with cultural dispossession such as:

- Alcohol and drugs (chemical dependencies, comorbidities or dual diagnoses, self medicating without medical supervision, solvent sniffing)
- Diet and nutrition
- Language and culture
- Domestic violence
- Father-and-son relationships

Many of these issues are not unique to the Noongar but in many cases they are unable to receive appropriate government-agency care. The report that was produced after this gathering also stated that Noongar men have a life expectancy of 20 years less than non-Aboriginal men, and go to hospital three times more often.

The Noongar still have large extended families and many families have difficulty accessing available structures of sheltered housing in Western Australia. The Western Australian government has dedicated several areas for the purpose of building communities specifically for the Noongar people, such as the (now closed) Swan Valley Noongar Community.

The Noongar themselves are tackling their own issues; for example, the Noongar Patrol, which is an Aboriginal Advancement Council initiative. It was set up to deter Aboriginal young people from offending behaviour and reduce the likelihood of their contact with the criminal justice system. The patrol uses mediation and negotiation with indigenous youth in an attempt to curb anti-social and offending behaviour of young people who come into the city at night.

== See also ==
- History of Indigenous Australians
- History of Western Australia
- Australian history wars
- List of Noongar people
- Noongar kin systems
- Noongarpedia
- Prehistory of Australia

== Sources ==
- AAP; AG (12 July 2010). "Warrior reburied 170 years after death". Australian Geographic. Archived from the original on 23 June 2013.
- Allbrook, Malcolm (2014). Henry Prinsep's Empire: Framing a distant colony. Australian National University Press. ISBN 978-1-925-02161-5.
- Bedells, Stephen J. (2010). Incarcerating Indigenous people of the Wongatha lands in the Eastern Goldfields of Western Australia: Indigenous leaders' perspectives. Edith Cowan University M.A. thesis.
- Bennell v Western Australia [2006] FCA 1243 (19 September 2006), Federal Court.
- "Biodiversity Hotspots – Australia – Overview". Conservation International. Archived from the original on 11 February 2006.
- Birdsall, Christina L. (1987). "Family History and Social Network among Nyungar People" (PDF). Aboriginal History. 11. ANU Press: 129–142. doi:10.22459/AH.11.2011.14. ISSN 0314-8769.
- Blacklock, Fabri (n.d.). "Essays about quilts: Aboriginal skin cloaks". National Quilt Register. Archived from the original on 12 February 2014.
- Bodney v Bennell [2008] FCAFC 63 (23 April 2008), Federal Court (Full Court).
- Callinan, Tara (presenter); Quartermaine, Craig (reporter) (14 April 2015). "WA Whistleblower 1: Allegations of Bullying, Intimidation in WA Dept of Aboriginal Affairs". NITV News – via YouTube.
- Clarke, Philip A. (August 2007). "Indigenous Spirit and Ghost Folklore of "Settled" Australia". Folklore. 118 (2): 141–161. doi:10.1080/00155870701337346. JSTOR 30035418. S2CID 161063585.
- "Closing the gap - Aboriginal and Torres Strait Islander peoples". Australian Indigenous HealthInfoNet.
- Cormick, Craig (9 September 1997). "Yagan: an Aboriginal resistance hero". Green Left Weekly.
- Entwisle, Timothy (2014). Sprinter and Sprummer: Australia's Changing Seasons. Melbourne: Csiro Publishing. ISBN 978-1-486-30204-8. OCLC 1097134622.
- "Executive Summary" (PDF). Tourism Western Australia.
- Giblett, Rodney James (2013). Black Swan Lake: Life of a Wetland. Cultural studies of natures, landscapes and environments. Bristol: Intellect Books. ISBN 978-1-841-50704-0. OCLC 828419017.
- Green, Neville; Moon, Susan (1997). Far From Home: Aboriginal Prisoners of Rottnest Island, 1838–1931. Perth.
- Haebich, Anna; Delroy, Anne (1999). The Stolen Generations – the separation of Aboriginal Children from their Families in Western Australia. Western Australian Museum.
- Henderson, John (2013). "Language documentation and community interests". In Jones, Mari C.; Ogilvie, Sarah (eds.). Keeping Languages Alive: Documentation, Pedagogy and Revitalization. Cambridge University Press. ISBN 978-1-107-65552-2.
- "Home". Nyoongar Patrol. Archived from the original on 29 October 2013.
- "Indigenous Weather Knowledge". PANDORA electronic collection. Canberra: Commonwealth Bureau of Meteorology. 2016. OCLC 224508417.
- Korff, Jens-Uwe (2009). "Wadjemup (Rottnest Island)". Creative Spirits. Archived from the original on 6 May 2009.
- "Language of the month series (number 11)". Federation of Aboriginal and Torres Strait Islander Languages. December 2000. Archived from the original on 4 December 2002.
- Limelight Arts Media (2021). "West Australian Opera: Koolbardi Wer Wardong". Limelight Arts Media. Archived from the original on 5 October 2021.
- McIntosh, Ian S (2008). "Pre-Macassans at Dholtji? Exploring one of north-east Arnhem Land's great conundrums" (PDF). In Sutton, Peter; Veth, Peter; Neale, Margo (eds.). Strangers on the Shore: Early Coastal Contact in Australia. National Museum of Australia. pp. 165–180. ISBN 978-1-876-94488-9.
- McMahon, Kristy (24 March 2015). "WA Government 'moving to deregister sacred sites'". National Indigenous Radio Service. Archived from the original on 4 February 2017.
- Moore, George (1842). A Descriptive Vocabulary of the Language in Common Use Amongst the Aboriginals of Western Australia. London: Wm. S. Orr & Co. LCCN 12028353. OCLC 5187310. OL 6549151M. Wikidata Q4656400 – via Internet Archive.
- Nayton, Gaye (2011). The Archaeology of Market Capitalism: A Western Australian Perspective. Springer Science & Business Media. ISBN 978-1-441-98318-3.
- "Noongar". Kaartdijin Noongar – Noongar Knowledge. South West Aboriginal Land & Sea Council.
- "Noongar history and culture" (PDF). South West Aboriginal Land & Sea Council. Archived from the original (PDF) on 18 February 2006.
- "Noongar Seasons". Quaalup Homestead Wilderness Retreat.
- Ord, Duncan (19 June 2006). "A Study of the Impact of the Noongar Community on the Western Australian Economy". University of Western Australia. Archived from the original on 21 August 2006.
- Ord, Duncan; Mazzarol, Tim (2007). "Unlocking the economic potential of an indigenous Australian community". In Dana, Léo-Paul; Anderson, Robert B. (eds.). International Handbook of Research on Indigenous Entrepreneurship. Edward Elgar Publishing. pp. 508–524. ISBN 978-1-781-95264-1.
- Russo, George (1980), Lord abbot of the wilderness: the life and times of Bishop Salvado, The Polding Press
- Ryan, John Charles (2013). Backhaus, Gary (ed.). "Towards a Phen(omen)ology of the Seasons: The Emergence of the Indigenous Weather Knowledge Project (IWKP)". Environment, Space, Place. 5 (1): 102–130. doi:10.7761/ESP.5.1.103. ISBN 978-6-068-26658-9. S2CID 56032383.
- Seal, Graham (2011). Outlaw Heroes in Myth and History. Anthem Press. ISBN 978-0-857-28792-2.
- Tilbrook, Lois (1983). Nyungar Tradition: Glimpses of Aborigines of South-Western Australia 1829–1914 (PDF). Nedlands: UWA Publishing. ISBN 978-0-85564-183-2. LCCN 83161415. OCLC 10457913. OL 3245454M. Wikidata Q136511559.
- "WGAR News: WA Government Deregisters World's Oldest Rock Art Collection As Sacred Site: Amy McQuire, New Matilda". Indymedia Australia. 9 May 2015.
- Wilson, Thomas (2017). Stepping Off: Rewilding and Belonging in the South-West. Fremantle Press. ISBN 978-1-925-16435-0.
- "Yirra Yaakin Noongar Theatre". Archived from the original on 15 December 2018.
