= Collar =

(The) Collar may refer to:

== Human neckwear ==
- Clerical collar (informally dog collar), a distinctive collar used by the clergy of some Christian religious denominations
- Collar (clothing), the part of a garment that fastens around or frames the neck
- Collar (jewelry), an ornament for the neck
- Collar (order), a symbol of membership in various chivalric orders
- Designation of workers by collar color
- Livery collar, including Collar of Esses, worn around the neck and shoulders as a mark of office
- Ruff (clothing), a type of collar worn in Western Europe from the mid-sixteenth century to the mid-seventeenth century
- Slave collar, collar used to identify of discipline slaves
- Collars in BDSM, devices of various materials placed around the neck of the submissive partner in BDSM

== Animal collars ==
- Collar (animal), a strap around an animal's neck to which a leash or tag may be attached
- Dog collar, a piece of material put around the neck of a dog
- Cat collar, a piece of material put around the neck of a cat
- Elizabethan collar, a protective device round the neck and head of an animal
- Flea collar or insect-repellent collar, an animal collar impregnated with pesticide
- Horse collar, means of transferring pulling effort of draught horse to its load
- Shock collar, an animal-training collar which creates an electric shock
- Tracking collar, a collar which uses a radio beacon or GPS to allow an animal to be tracked

== Other uses ==
- Cervical collar, a medical device worn round the neck to support the head
- Collar, collar beam or collar tie, a structural element in roof framing between two rafters
- Collar (baseball), jargon for a player getting no hits in a game
- Collar (film), a 2014 Canadian horror film
- Collar (finance), a combination of an equal number of call and put options at slightly different exercise prices
- Collar neighbourhood, in topology a thickening of a submanifold
- Police slang for an arrest
- Shaft collar or drill collar, a piece of hardware used on power transmission devices as a mechanical stop, locating device, or bearing face
- Collar (group), a Hong Kong Cantopop girl group
- "The Collar", a song by Mr and Mrs Smith and Mr Drake from Mr and Mrs Smith and Mr Drake
- "Collared" (The Detectives), a 1994 television episode
- Pallet collar, a type of box for transport of bulk items
- The Collar (book), a short story collection by Frank O'Connor
- The Collar (poem), a 1633 poem by George Herbert
- The Collar (The Rookie), a TV episode

== Names ==
- Enrique Collar (1934–2025), Spanish footballer
- F Collar, a business established in 1932 manufacturing oars, masts and spars

== See also ==
- Collard (disambiguation)
