= Collard =

Collard may refer to:

== Plants ==
- Collard (plant), certain loose-leafed Brassica oleracea cultivars
  - Collard liquor, a soup made from collard greens
- Tree collard, a popular name for Brassica oleracea, also known as wild cabbage

== Geography ==
- Mount Collard, a mountain in Antarctica

== Music ==
- "Collard Greens" (song), a 2013 song by hip hop artist Schoolboy Q
- Collard Greens & Gravy, Australian blues band

== People ==
- Adam Collard (born 1995), English television personality and fitness coach
- Antoine-Athanase Royer-Collard (1768-1825), French physician and psychiatrist
- Auguste Hippolyte Collard (c. 1812-c. 1897), French photographer
- Catherine Collard (1947-1993), French pianist
- Christina Collard (born 1988), Australian actress, television presenter, writer, and model
- Christine Collard, cover identity for the British World War II secret agent Marie Christine Chilver (1920–2007)
- Clare Collard (born ? ), American politician
- Clay Collard (born 1993), American professional mixed martial artist and boxer
- Clayton Collard (born 1988), Australian rules footballer
- Christopher Collard (born 1934), British classical scholar
- Cyril Collard (1957–1993), French author, filmmaker, composer, musician, and actor
- Cyril Collard (footballer) (1934–2011), Indigenous Australian professional Australian rules footballer
- Douglas Collard (born 1952), English cricketer
- Dudley Collard (1907–1963), British barrister and writer on law in the Soviet Union
- Dylan Collard (born 2000), Portuguese footballer
- Edgar Andrew Collard (1911–2000), Canadian journalist and historian
- Emmanuel Collard (born 1971), French racing driver
- Fred Collard (1912–1986), Australian politician
- Frederick William Collard (1772–1860), British piano manufacturer
- George Collard (1916–1983), Australian rules footballer
- Gilbert Collard (born 1948), French writer, barrister, and politician
- Glenys Collard (born 1958), Noongar educator and writer
- Hap Collard (1898–1968), or Earl Clinton "Hap" Collard, American Major League Baseball pitcher
- Henri Collard (1912–1988), Belgian cyclist
- Ian Collard (born 1947), English professional footballer
- Jacob Collard (born 1995), Australian professional footballer
- Jean Collard (1881–1951), Belgian sculptor
- Jean-Philippe Collard (born 1948), French pianist
- Jehanne Collard (1950–2021), French lawyer and activist
- Lance Collard (born 2005), Australian rules footballer
- Léo Collard (1902–1981), Belgian politician, mayor, and government minister
- Leonard Collard (born 1959), Noongar elder, professor, and Australian Research Council investigator
- Louis Collard (1915–1947), also known as Marie-Joseph Collard, Belgian Walloon fascist politician and Nazi collaborator
- Lucille Collard (born ? ), Canadian politician
- Maxime Collard (born 1983), French Olympic equestrian athlete
- Mel Collard (1894–1971), American athlete and coach
- Mélodie Collard (born 2003), Canadian tennis player
- Michelle Collard (born 1975), Canadian biathlete
- Ora Collard (1902–1961), American businessman and politician
- Paul Collard (1952–2005), American entrepreneur and U.S. Robotics founder
- Pierre Paul Royer-Collard (1763–1845), French statesman and philosopher
- Richard Collard (1911–1962), British Royal Air Force officer and politician
- Ricky Collard (born 1996), British racing driver
- Rob Collard (born 1968), British racing driver
- Robert Collard (1884–1973), also known as Lortac or Robert Lortac, French writer, illustrator, portraitist, animator, and art critic
- Sneed B. Collard III (born 1959), American author
- Stan Collard (born 1936), Australian politician
- Tony Collard (born 1961), Dutch ice hockey player
- Valentine Collard (c. 1770–1846), British Royal Navy admiral
- Véronique Collard (born 1963), Belgian long-distance runner
