= First cat =

First cat may refer to:

- Certain cats associated with national governments:
  - United States presidential pets, which have included cats
  - Chief Mouser to the Cabinet Office in the United Kingdom
  - Think Think and Ah Tsai, two cats owned by Taiwanese president Tsai Ing-wen
- The domestication of the cat
- Proailurus, the first member of the cat family
