= Colard =

Colard is both a surname and a given name. Notable people with the name include:

- Jean-Christophe Colard (born 1980), French footballer
- Thibault Colard (born 1992), French rower
- Colard Mansion, 15th-century Flemish scribe and printer

== See also ==
- Collard (disambiguation)
