= Domestication of the cat =

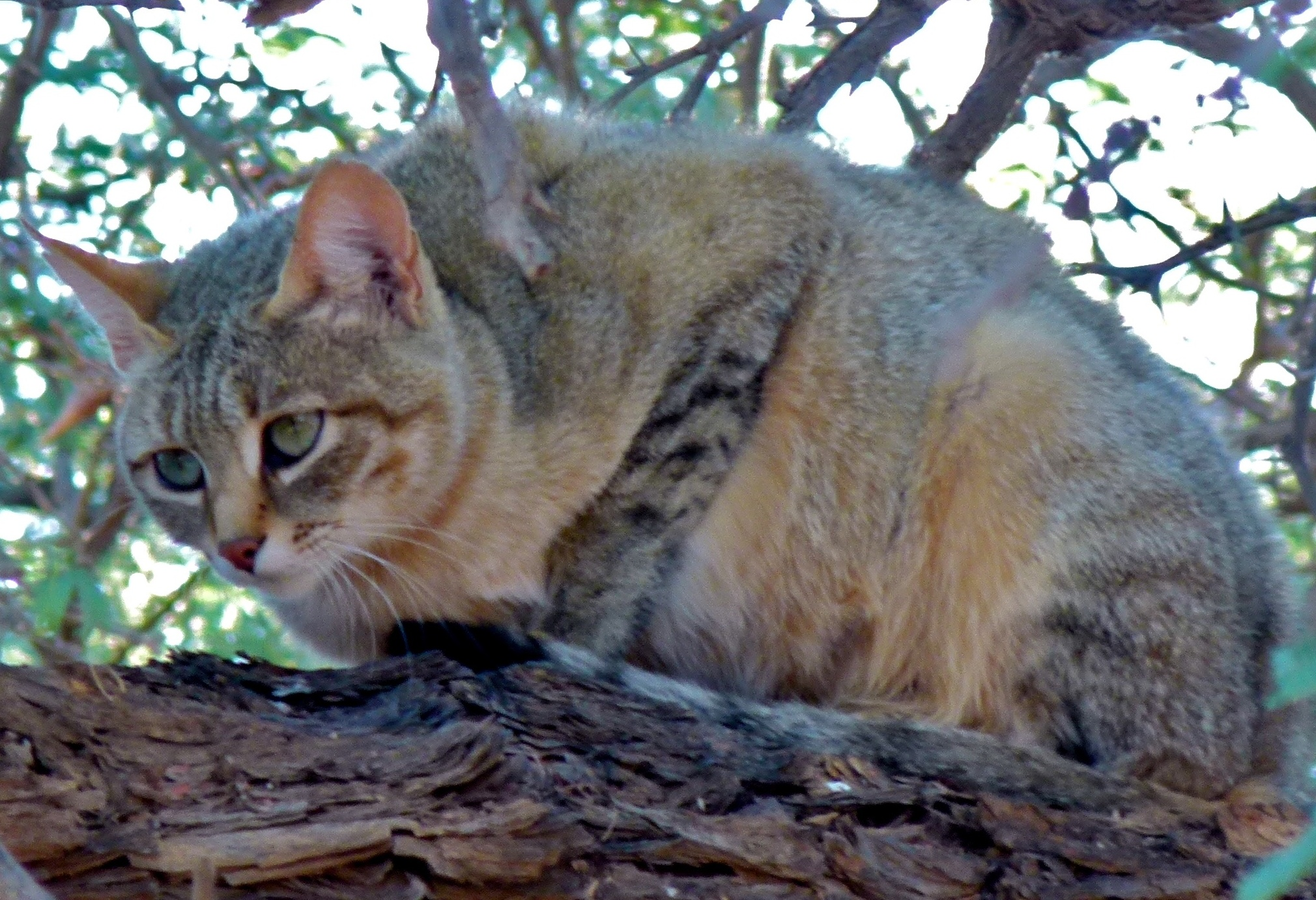
Felis lybica, the ancestor and wild counterpart of the modern domestic cat.

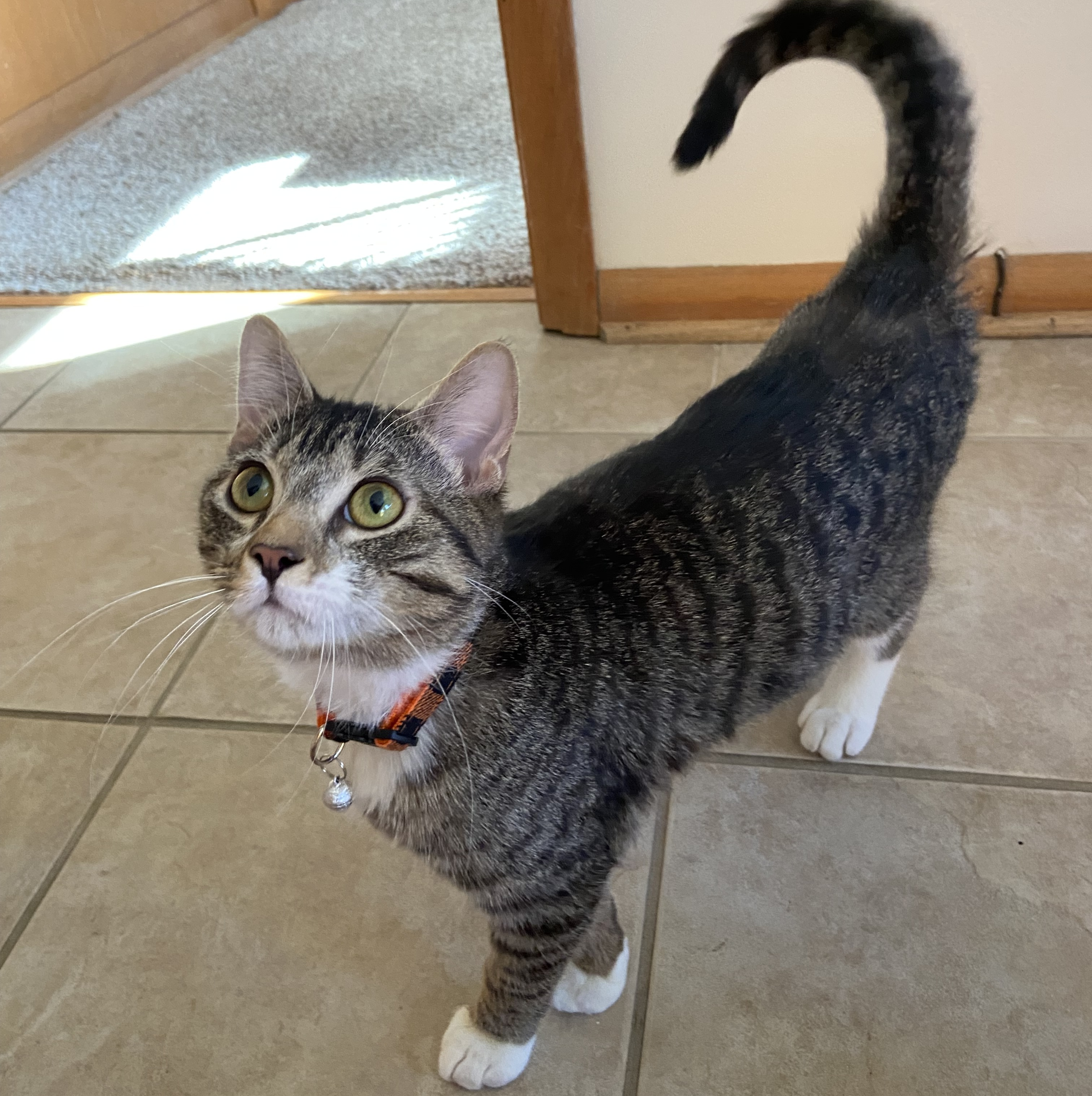
An example of a domesticated, indoor cat wearing a cat collar and bell

The domestication of the cat can be traced back to Near Eastern and Egyptian populations of the African wildcat, Felis lybica, from which emerged the domestic cat (Felis catus). Both belong to the Felis lineage of the family Felidae, which is thought to have first diversified around 13 to 12 million years ago. Several investigations have indicated all domestic varieties of cats come from a single lineage of F. lybica, although early interactions between wildcats and Neolithic human settlements occurred across a broad geographic range.

Early domestic cats followed farmers, with archaeological evidence indicating they had spread to the isolated island of Cyprus approximately 9,500 years ago and as far as Bulgaria and Romania 6,000 years ago. In a second wave, cats followed trade routes to Northern Europe (remains in Denmark dating back to 200 CE have been found) and East Asia, with the first evidence for domestic cats in China appearing by 600 CE.

The earliest interactions between wildcats and humans began as commensal, as cats were drawn to early agricultural settlements due to their thriving rodent populations. Cats may be considered to be only partially domesticated; unlike most domestic animals, they were never subject to strong selective breeding, and can therefore be observed to retain some of the behavior of their wild ancestors.

A separate but ultimately unsuccessful domestication of leopard cats in ancient East Asia demonstrates that prolonged proximity to humans does not inevitably lead to domestication.

Advances in paleogenomics and the sequencing of ancient nuclear DNA has greatly helped revise the history of ancient cats, which could otherwise be hard to decipher due to ancient hybridization between morphologically similar wild species.

== Phylogenetics ==
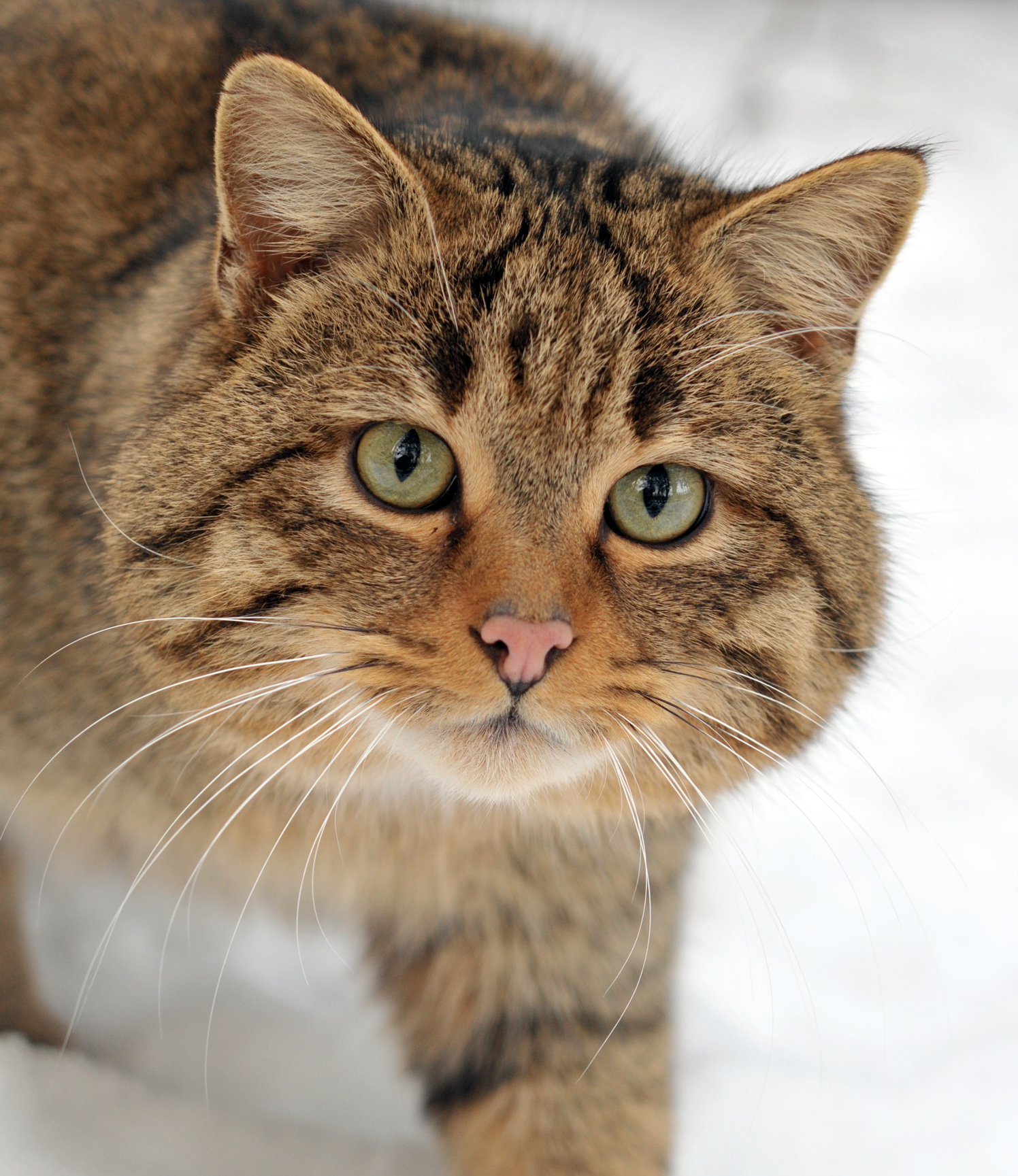
F. s. silvestris, the European wildcat, morphologically almost indistinguishable from the domestic cat but behaviorally distinct, now understood to have contributed mtDNA signatures to ancient European cat populations through hybridization rather than domestication

Current taxonomy tends to treat F. silvestris, F. lybica, F. catus, and F. bieti as different species. A landmark 2007 study of feline mitochondrial DNA and microsatellites from approximately 1,000 cats drawn from regions including Africa, Azerbaijan, Kazakhstan, Mongolia, and the Middle East identified five genetic lineages of the wildcat:

- Felis silvestris silvestris (Europe)
- Felis silvestris bieti (China)
- Felis silvestris ornata (Central Asia)
- Felis silvestris cafra (Southern Africa)
- Felis silvestris lybica (Middle East and North Africa)

This study showed that the African wildcat taxon (F. s. lybica) includes domesticated cats, and that wild cats from this group were almost indistinguishable from domesticated cats. Phylogenetic analysis of mitochondrial DNA indicated that F. s. ornata, F. s. cafra, and F. s. lybica form a monophyletic group sharing a common ancestor, and that F. s. lybica gave rise to the domesticated cats of today, while F. s. silvestris (pictured) branched off very early from the others.

However, a genomic time transect later found that the dispersal of ancient cats dated between approximately 9,500 and 6,300 years ago, which previous mitochondrial studies had identified as early Near Eastern domestic cats dispersing into Europe alongside Neolithic farmers, were in fact European wildcats (F. silvestris) whose ancestors had hybridized with F. s. lybica. Ancient African wildcat ancestry in these specimens ranged from approximately 9 to 34 percent, increasing eastward from Bulgaria to central Anatolia, reflecting a zone of past contact between the two species. This has led to a hypothesis that the dispersal of domestic cats into Europe and then beyond may have occurred millennia later than was previously thought.

Domesticated cats started to spread during Neolithic times, but likely did not become widespread throughout the Old World until classical antiquity. A 2018 study placed their earliest origins more specifically in the Near East.

A genetic review of over 1,000 random-bred cats from more than 40 countries, using single-nucleotide polymorphism and short tandem repeat data, confirmed that domestic cats essentially form one worldwide population. Heterozygosity is highest in the eastern Mediterranean Basin and the Levant, then decreases outwards, in a pattern supporting the Near East being the area of earliest human–cat interaction.

=== Genomic characteristics ===
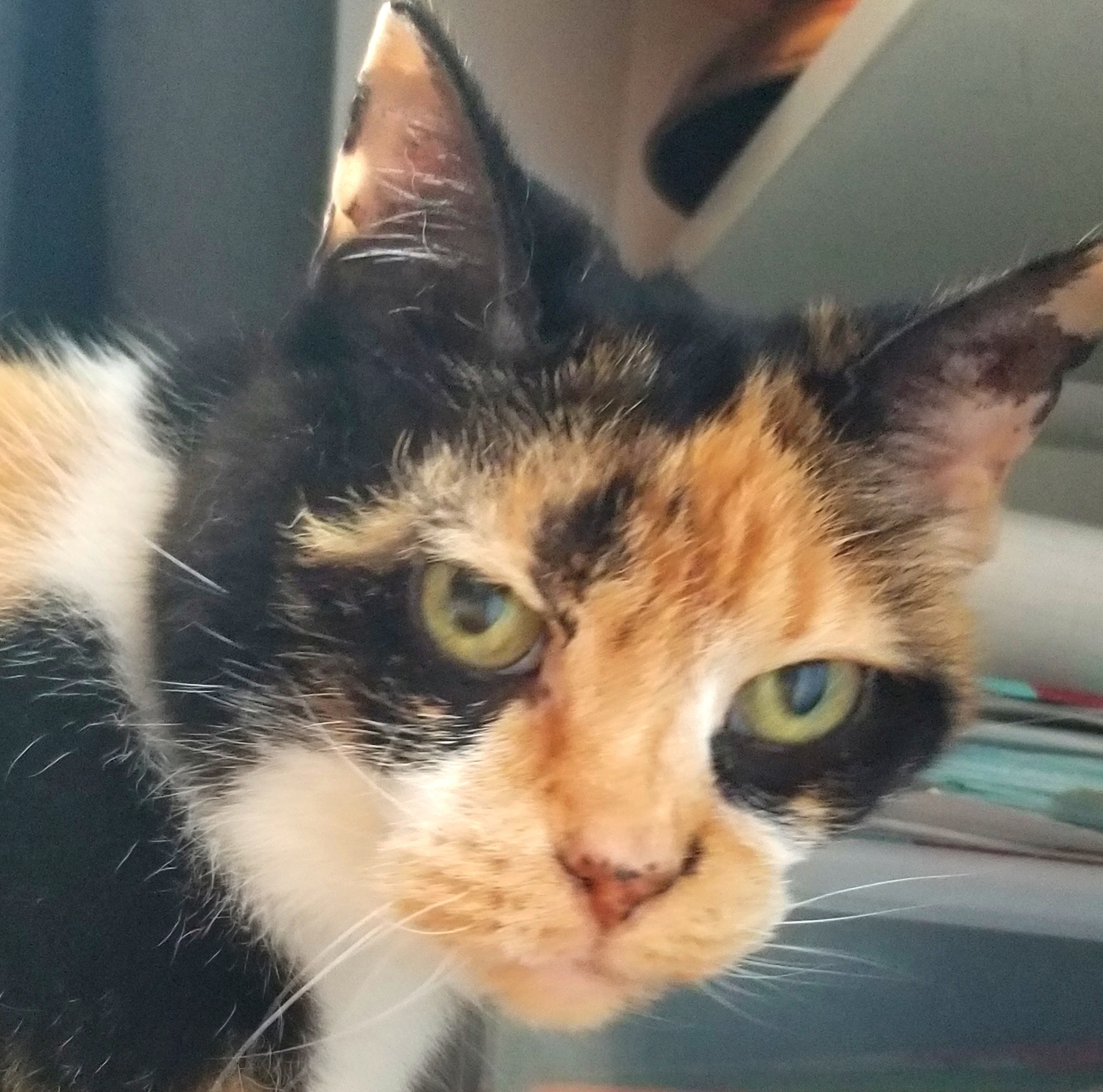
Selective breeding in cats was historically uncommon and focused on aesthetic traits, such as the unique fur coat of Calico cats. This preserved their ancient genetic diversity, much unlike other domestic animals.

A 2014 study compared cat genomes with tiger and dog genomes. Genomic regions under selection in domestic cats included those involved in neuronal processes (fear and reward behavior) and in homologous recombination (increased recombination frequency). In addition, the KIT mutations responsible for the white-spotted phenotype were identified.

Domestic cats have unusually high single nucleotide variant diversity compared with most other domestic animals, approximately 9.6 million in an average specimen, compared with the 4 to 5 million SNVs typically found in a single human. This peculiarity reflects the unusual nature of cat domestication: rather than undergoing strong selective breeding and population bottlenecks typical of domestic species, cats effectively "self-domesticated", without losing ancestral traits, such as their hunting behavior. Additionally, domestic cats lack several physical traits commonly found among other, more traditionally domesticated animals, such as a decrease in size, curved tails, and floppy ears.

Intensive selective breeding of cats only began about 200 years ago, and has focused almost entirely on aesthetic genetic traits.

The blotched tabby cat trait (Aminopeptidase Q mutation) arose in the Middle Ages. Wild-type cats have a mackerel pattern.

== Archaeology ==
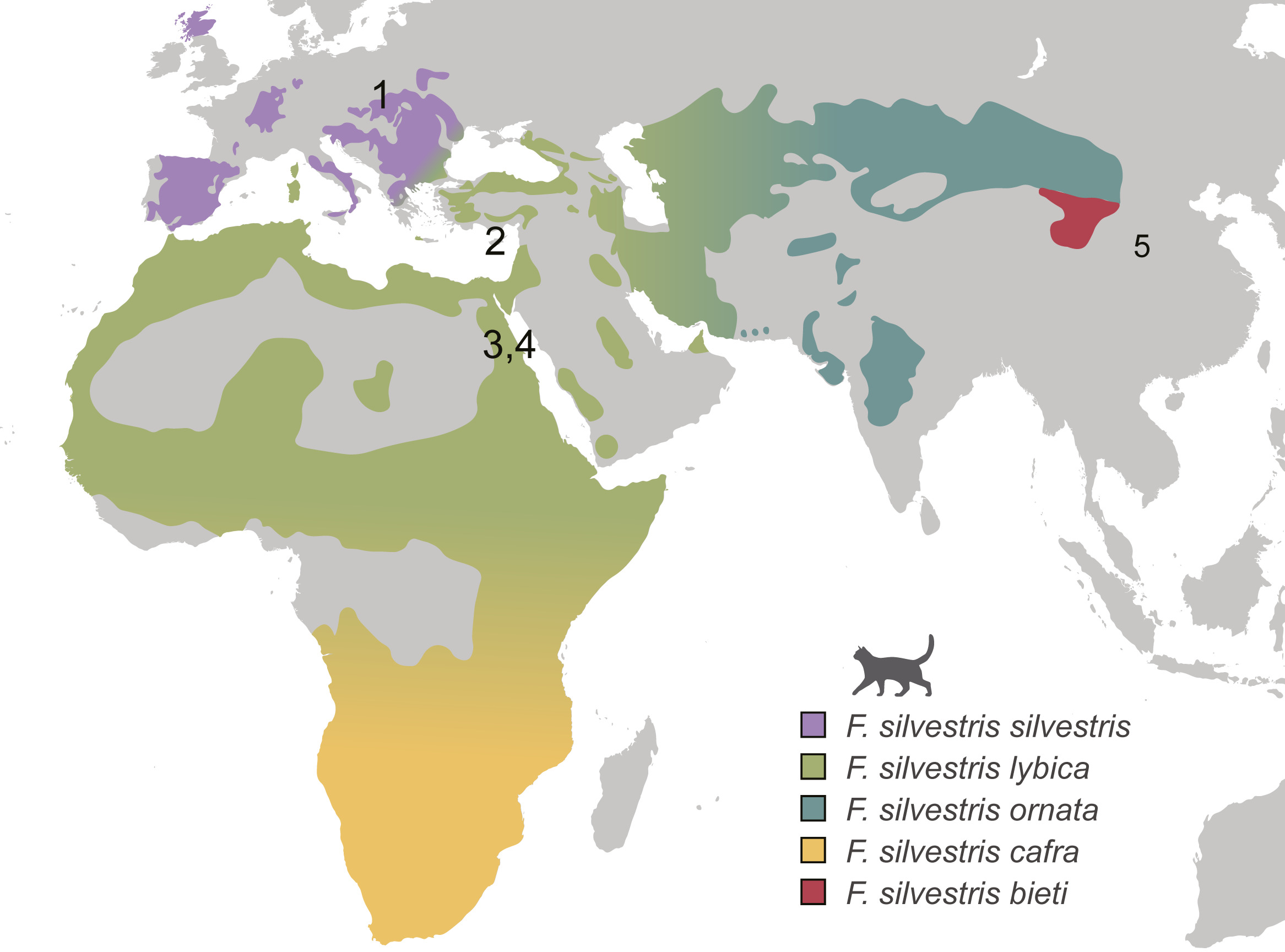
Archeological finds of cat commensalism. 1,2 (Poland, Cyprus): F. lybica outside native range. 2,3: Cat burials 4: Theban household cat 5: Domesticated Leopard cat

Archaeology has supported the conclusion that F. lybica, native to North Africa and the Near East, is the common ancestor of domesticated cats, and that minor morphological changes from their wild counterparts, such as a smaller cranial volume, followed domestication. Still, cats remain scarce in the archaeological record because they were not typically eaten, so that their bones were rarely discarded in the middens that archaeologists often excavate. The relatively small size of cat bones also makes them more difficult to detect.

=== Near East ===
House mice appear to have thrived in early Neolithic Natufian hunter-gatherer dwellings, which date to as early as 15,000 years ago, thus providing a new food source for wildcats at the time.

By about 9,500 years ago, people in the Eastern Mediterranean were keeping cats closely enough to transport them to Cyprus, as suggested by the discovery of a cat buried with a human skeleton at a Neolithic farming settlement on the island. The native range of F. lybica did not include Cyprus; as such, their presence indicates intentional human translocation, although it is uncertain whether this was as a pet, a semi-tamed wildcat, or an early domestic.

=== Egypt ===
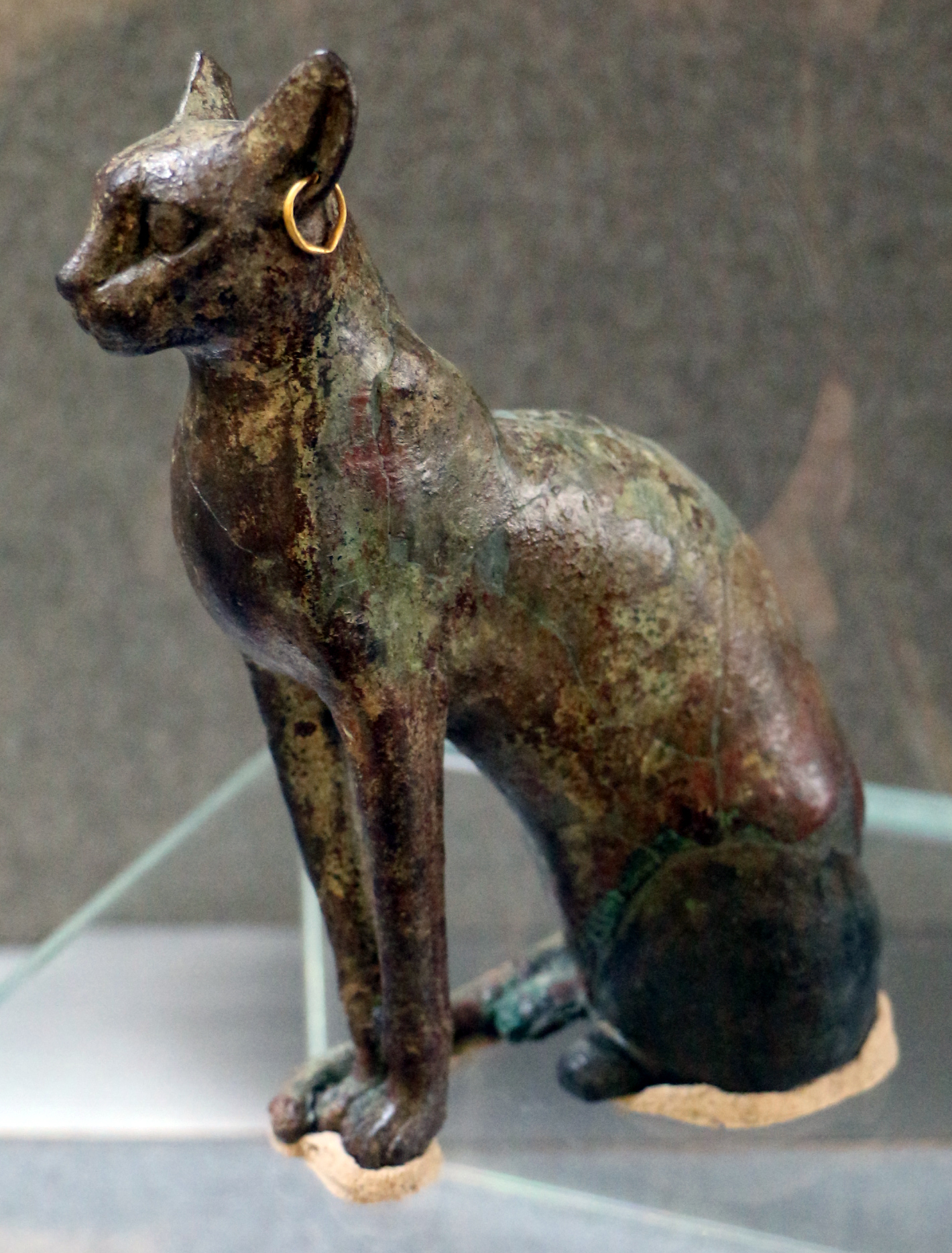
Bastet Statuette in the Milan Egyptian Museum.

Egypt has long been considered the primary center for the cultural integration and full domestication of cats. Excavations at the Predynastic elite cemetery at Hierakonpolis, the ancient capital of Upper Egypt, have yielded some of the earliest physical evidence for wildcat taming. A swamp cat, dated by associated pottery to around 3700 BC, had healed fractures of its femur and humerus, likely indicating it had been held in captivity and cared for by humans for at least four to six weeks before its death. Further excavations of the same site found a pit containing six simultaneously buried cats dated to the Naqada IC-IIB period, including an adult male, an adult female, and four kittens from two different litters. Their ages at death deviate from the naturally seasonal birth pattern observed in wild Egyptian cats, providing circumstantial evidence of co-habitance with humans.

The oldest genetically confirmed domestic cats from Egypt are cat mummies dated to about the 5th to 1st centuries BC. Yet iconographic and textual evidence obviously places cats entering Egyptian life much earlier. Wall paintings dated to about 1500 BC depict cats eating fish near a table, and hieroglyphs used the word for "female cat" as a girl's nickname by at least 4000 years ago, demonstrating the close relationship between cats and Egyptian households.

The cultural significance of cats in ancient Egypt deepened during the first millennium BC, coinciding with a surge of the cult of the goddess Bastet. Originally appearing in Egyptian illustrations around 2800 BC with the head of a lion, Bastet was later depicted with the head of a cat by approximately the first millennium BC. Pilgrims visiting her temples purchased cat mummies as offerings, and to meet this demand, dedicated "catteries" were established to raise large enough numbers of cats for slaughter. An immense number of cat mummies were produced across several centuries, the majority killed by spinal dislocation or skull fracturing. The requirement to maintain large populations of cats in close quarters with humans would have created sustained selection pressure in favor of docile individuals tolerant of confinement and human contact. Evolutionary biologist Greger Larson of the University of Oxford has proposed this as a potential domestication pathway, describing it as the "murder pathway", in which generations of ritual sacrifice selected for tameness. Not all researchers accept this specific mechanism; others argue that the same forces that drew wildcats into Egyptian homes in the first place, primarily grain stores and the rodents they attracted, are sufficient to explain domestication without invoking the religious cult.

=== Europe ===
Isotope analysis of F. s. lybica cat remains recovered from cave sites in the Kraków-Częstochowa Upland of southern Poland, dated approximately from 4,200 to 2,300 BCE, found that they fed on both forest prey, as well as agricultural rodent pest species and on omnivorous birds associated with farming landscapes. This indicates a synanthropic diet shaped by proximity farming communities but without full domestication.

== Chinese failed domestication ==
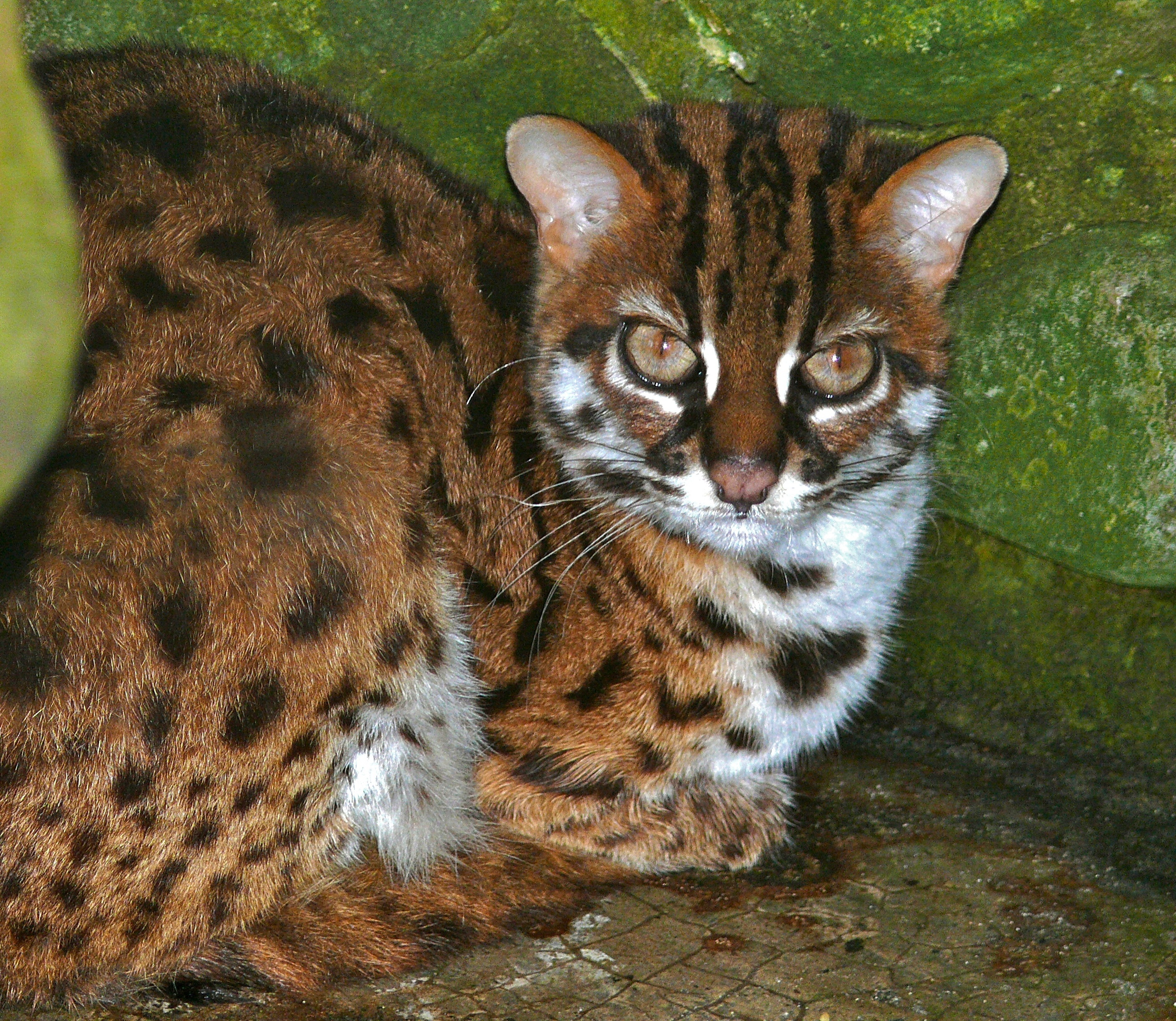
Prionailurus bengalensis, the Leopard Cat

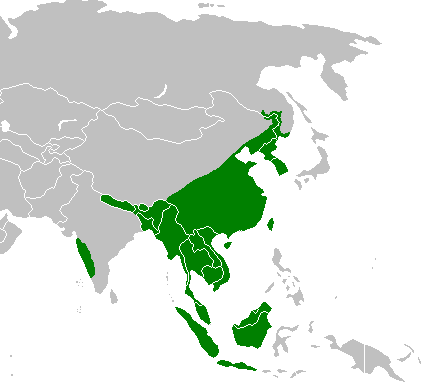
Distribution of the Leopard cat.

There is at least one other example of a felid species entering a commensal relationship with humans. The leopard cat, a small wild cat native to the Eastern half of Asia, developed a relationship with late Neolithic Chinese farming communities that persisted for millennia but ultimately did not lead to domestication. Ancient DNA analysis of 22 small felid specimens from archaeological sites across China demonstrated that commensal leopard cats appeared in Chinese human settlements around 5,400 years ago and maintained a presence in the archaeological record until approximately 150 CE, before largely vanishing from both excavations and ancient Chinese art.

Stable isotope analysis of remains from the Quanhucan site of central China, dated to c.5,500 years ago, had earlier been thought to suggest that domestic cats were already present in Neolithic China. However, subsequent morphological and genetic analysis confirmed those specimens were leopard cats rather than early domestic cats, representing a somewhat commensal but not fully domesticated population. The disappearance of leopard cats from Chinese archaeological sites after the collapse of the Han dynasty around 200 CE may reflect socioeconomic disruptions during the subsequent dynastic transition, which reduced the amount of agricultural production that had likely attracted the animals, in a pattern analogous to the temporary disappearance of black rats from some parts of Europe following the fall of the Roman Empire. Domestic cats were eventually introduced to East Asia through the Silk road a few centuries later, with the first evidence being discovered in 730 CE. The leopard cat belongs to the genus Prionailurus and does not usually interbreed with species of the genus Felis. Human-mediated crossing between the two species began only in the 1980s, producing the Bengal cat breed. The parallel but ultimately divergent histories of leopard cats and African wildcats in human settlements illustrate that prolonged proximity is a necessary but not sufficient condition for domestication.

== Dispersal ==
=== Spread into Europe ===
Ancient genomic findings have substantially revised the picture of how and when domestic cats entered Europe. A 2025 study analyzed the genomes of 70 ancient cats from 97 European and Anatolian archaeological sites together with 17 modern wildcat specimens from Italy and North Africa, concluded that the modern strains of domestic cats likely did not spread into Europe with Neolithic farmers, as previous mitochondrial studies had indicated. Instead, the study identified at least two genetically distinct introductions from North Africa.

In the first, probably during the first millennium BCE, partially tamed F. lybica cats were introduced to Sardinia, founding the island's present-day wild F. lybica population.

In the second, a different African wildcat population, estimated to have entered Europe no later than approximately 2,000 years ago, went on to comprise the lion's share of the modern domestic cat gene pool in the continent. The earliest firmly identified domestic cat from mainland Europe (excluding Mediterranean islands), is from Austria, and is dated to c.50 BC, although domestic cats were likely present on the continent for some centuries before that.

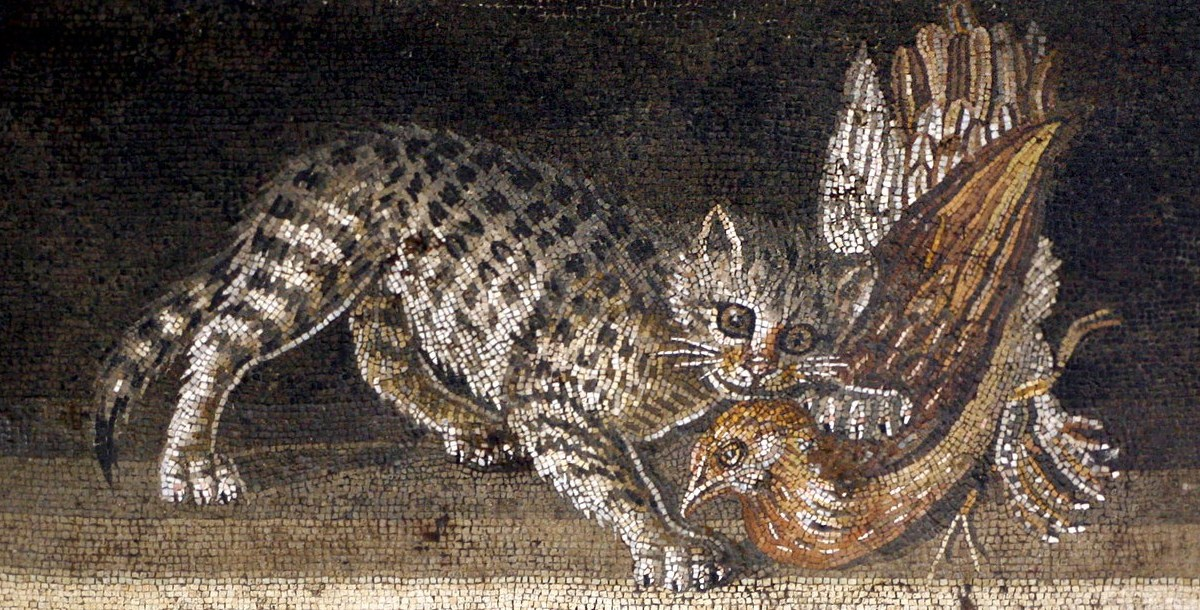
Roman mosaic from Pompeii (a city destroyed in 79 AD) showing a cat and a partridge

The ancient Phoenician city of Carthage, with its large grain-producing hinterland and extensive Mediterranean maritime trade networks, has been proposed as a possible center for spreading the early synanthropic domestic cats, preceding their wider dispersal. By the Roman period, cats were being actively provisioned by their owners rather than merely tolerated for pest control. Excavations of Roman-era cats in Central Europe show dietary signatures closely resembling those of humans and domestic dogs in the area.

=== Spread into Asia ===
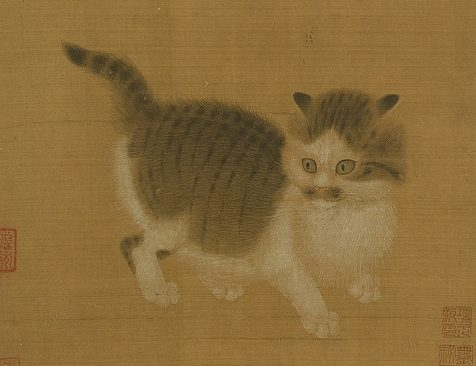
A Kitten painting from the Song Dynasty.

Domestic cats arrived in East Asia far later than the partially tame wild leopard cats they seem to have succeeded. The earliest confirmed domestic cat from China was recovered from Tongwan City in Shaanxi province, a key hub along the Silk Road in western China, and has been directly radiocarbon-dated to approximately 730 CE during the Tang Dynasty. It was identified as a fully or partially white cat most closely related to cats from the Levant, and broader analysis of both modern and ancient Eurasian cat genomes placed the origin of east asian domestic cats to a merchant-mediated dispersal via the Silk Road. Domestic cats were thus among the latest major domesticated animals to reach east Asia, arriving centuries after cattle, sheep, goats, and horses. Domestic cats and tame leopard cats never overlapped in time in the same Chinese archaeological record, and no evidence of genetic exchange between the two species prior to modern times has been found.

=== Worldwide spread ===
Ship's cats have long been used to manage pests and as good luck symbols

From the first millennium BCE onward, Phoenician, Greek, and later Roman traders transported domestic cats along Mediterranean maritime routes, establishing populations that then spread further inland, such as with the expansion of the Roman Empire.

During the Age of Discovery, cats were carried on ships to combat rodent infestations of cargo, this led to populations being established in the Americas, Australia, and in the other regions that previously lacked domestic cats. Modern cat populations in these regions, as well as parts of Subsaharan Africa, genetically cluster closely with Western European cats, reflecting the genetic imprint of European colonization on domestic cats throughout Earth.

House mice, which are also followers of human settlements albeit less beloved, dispersed along nearly identical routes and have been used as independent proxies to corroborate the migration history of domestic cats.

== Behavioral evidence ==
Behavioral analysis of F. s. silvestris (the European wildcat), once proposed as a possible ancestor of the domestic cat, showed significant differences between the two. The European wildcat tends to be more aggressive than domestic cats even when raised from kittenhood around humans. European wildcats are also more territorial and show intraspecific aggression. Hybrids between domestic cats and F. s. silvestris showed less aggressive behavior and a more docile temperament, leading researchers to conclude that the behavioral difference is genetic and reflects a difference in species. This evidence supported the identification of F. s. lybica as the common ancestor of all domesticated cats.

Unlike dogs, which show clear evidence of extensive behavioral modification over tens of thousands of years of deliberate selection, domestic cats retain many behavioral traits of their wild progenitor. Random-bred cat populations can revert rapidly toward wild behaviors when isolated from human contact, and individual cats can survive and reproduce without human assistance. The domestic cat is consequently described by some researchers as only "semi-domesticated," occupying an intermediate position between wild and fully domesticated animals.

== Domestic cat breeds ==
Unlike other domesticated animals bred for practical traits related to hunting, herding, or food production, modern cat breeds have mostly originated within the last 150 years from selective breeding for aesthetic physical characteristics. Another difference from most other domesticated mammals is that, as a result of ongoing intermixing with wild cats and the relatively weak artificial selection applied until recently, domesticated cat breeds have fewer genetic differences from their wild counterparts than, for example, dog breeds do from wolves. Unlike these other domesticated species, there are fewer than 30 to 40 genetically distinct domestic cat breeds.

=== Contemporary breeds ===
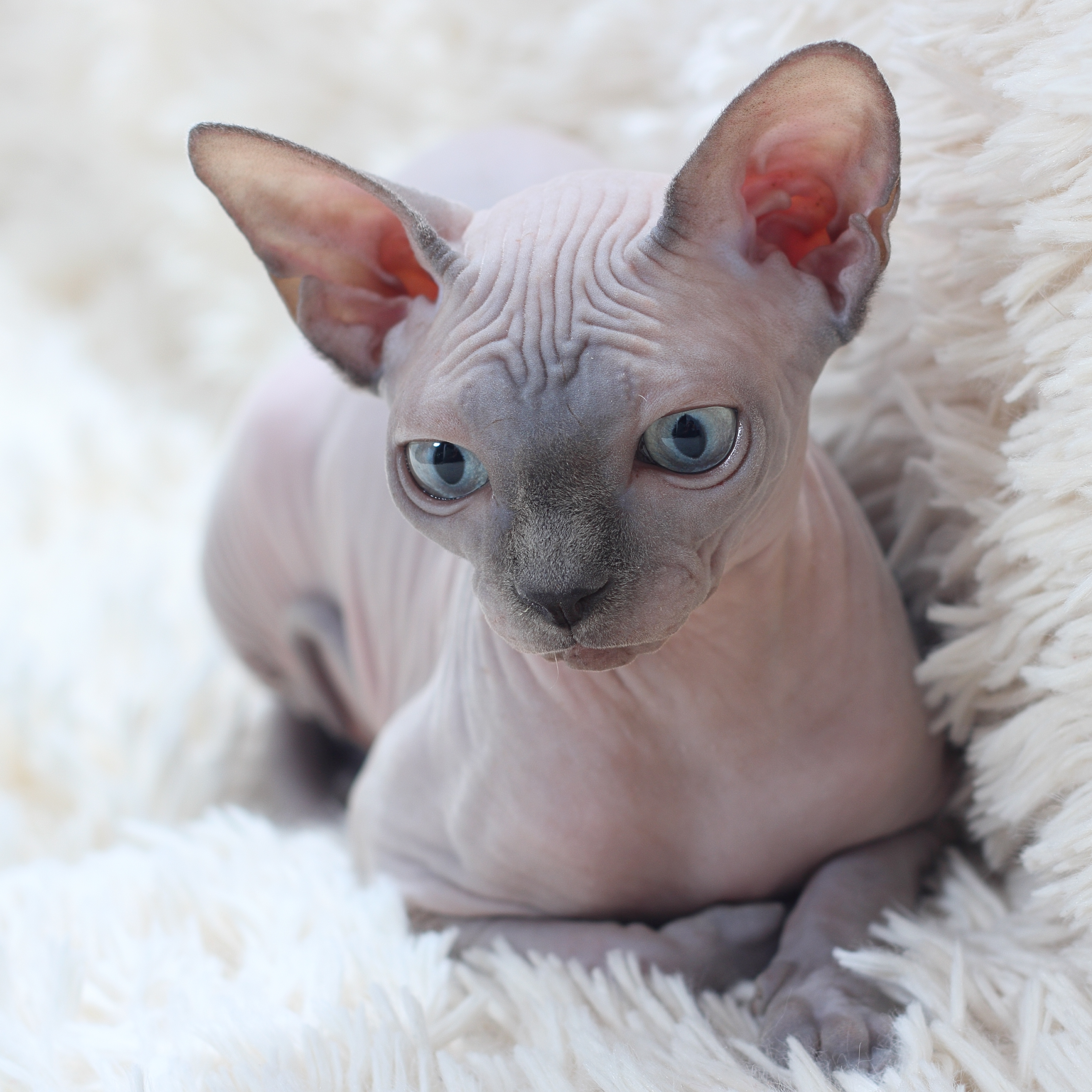
A Sphynx cat, one of the cat breeds resulting from human selective breeding during the last century and a half

In 1871 only five cat breeds were recognized by an association in London. Today the US-based Cat Fanciers' Association (CFA) recognizes 41 breeds and The International Cat Association (TICA) recognizes 73 breeds. Most of these breeds are defined by phenotypic, or visible, characteristics, most of which are single gene traits found at low to moderate levels in the non-pedigree cat population. Unlike most pet dogs, which come from mixtures of pure-breed lineages, cats started as a mixture of many wildcat variations and have been selectively bred by humans for certain traits, leading to a relatively rapid proliferation of named breeds. This is also the reason why associations that classify cat breeds use the word "pedigreed," as domestic cats do not have true purebred forms in the sense applied to dogs.

DNA studies have connected pedigree lines to random-bred populations. All cat breeds were found to have originated in eight different regions and then were selectively bred and relocated throughout history, leading to approximately 45 modern breeds. These eight lineages are associated with Europe, Egypt, India, Southeast Asia, the Arabian Sea region, East Asia, and the Mediterranean.

== See also ==
- Cat genetics
- Domestication
- Evolutionary history of Felidae
