= E collar =

E collar may refer to:

- Elizabethan collar, a protective medical device worn by an animal
- Shock collar, an electronic training aid
