= Neck strap =

Neck strap may refer to:

- Lanyard – Necklace used to hold ID cards or other items
- Collar (animal) – Harness for animals, especially for horses
