= Wound licking =

Instinctive response in humans and many animals

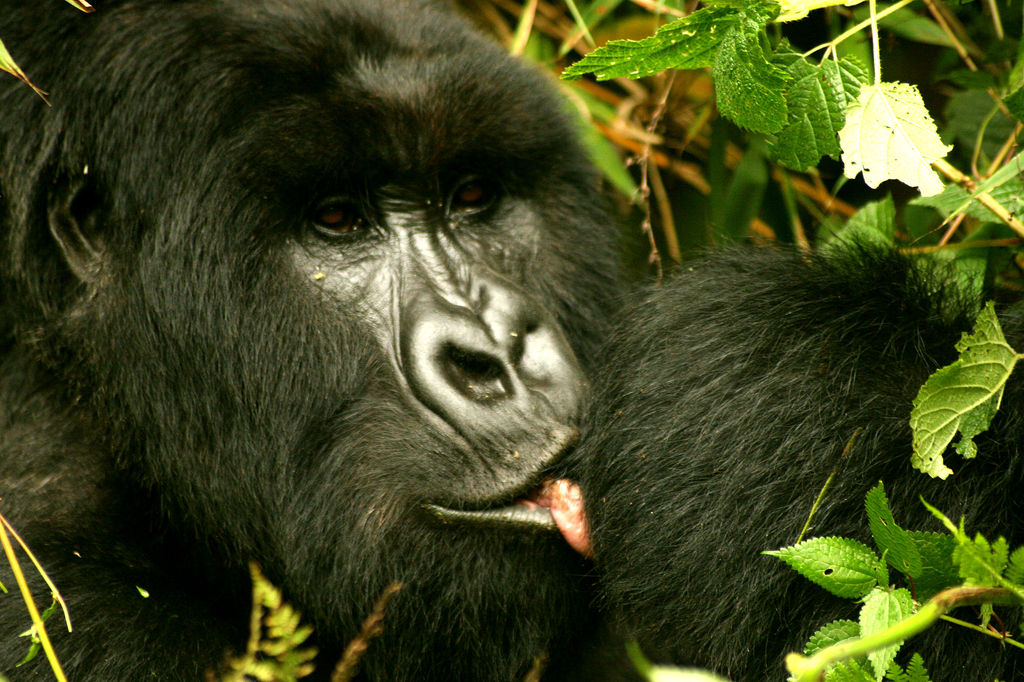
A gorilla licking a wound

Wound licking is an instinctive response in humans and many other animals to cover an injury or second degree burn with saliva. Dogs, cats, small rodents, horses, and primates, including humans, all lick wounds. Saliva contains tissue factor which promotes the blood clotting mechanism. The enzyme lysozyme is found in many tissues and is known to attack the cell walls of many gram-positive bacteria, aiding in defense against infection. Tears are also beneficial to wounds due to the lysozyme enzyme. However, there are also infection risks due to bacteria in the mouth.

== Mechanism ==
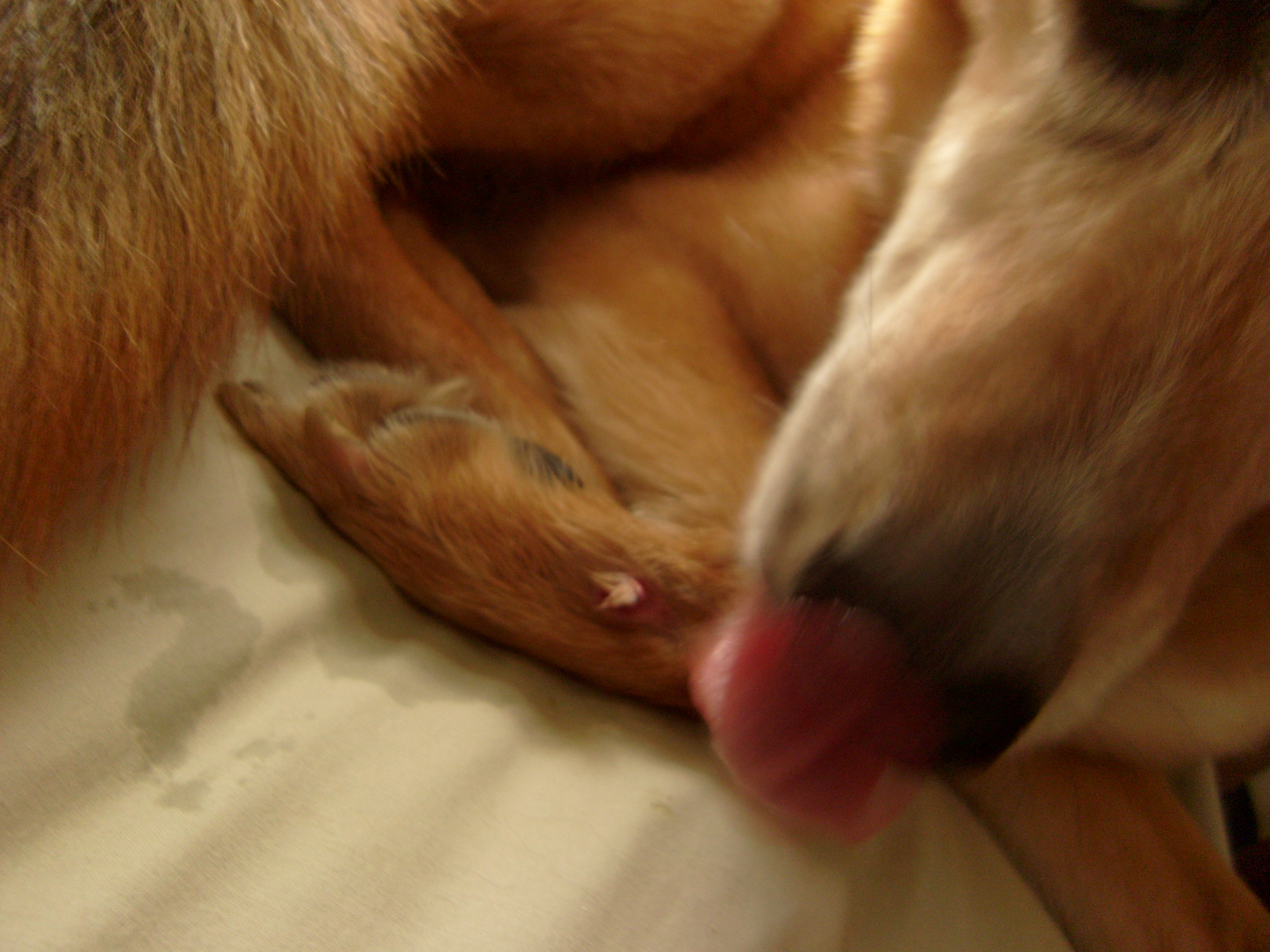
A dog licking a wounded paw

Oral mucosa heals faster than skin, suggesting that saliva may have properties that aid wound healing. Saliva contains cell-derived tissue factor, and many compounds that are antibacterial or promote healing. Salivary tissue factor, associated with microvesicles shed from cells in the mouth, promotes wound healing through the extrinsic blood coagulation cascade. The enzymes lysozyme and peroxidase, defensins, cystatins and an antibody, IgA, are all antibacterial. Thrombospondin and some other components are antiviral. A protease inhibitor, secretory leukocyte protease inhibitor, is present in saliva and is both antibacterial and antiviral, and a promoter of wound healing. Nitrates that are naturally found in saliva break down into nitric oxide on contact with skin, which will inhibit bacterial growth. Saliva contains growth factors such as epidermal growth factor, VEGF, TGF-β1, leptin, IGF-I, lysophosphatidic acid, hyaluronan and NGF, which all promote healing, although levels of EGF and NGF in humans are much lower than those in rats. In humans, histatins may play a larger role. As well as being growth factors, IGF-I and TGF-α induce antimicrobial peptides. Saliva also contains an analgesic, opiorphin. Licking will also tend to debride the wound and remove gross contamination from the affected area. In a recent study, scientists have confirmed through several experiments that the protein responsible for healing properties in human saliva is, in fact, histatin. Scientists are now looking for ways to make use of this information in ways that can lead to chronic wounds, burns, and injuries being healed by saliva.

== In animals ==
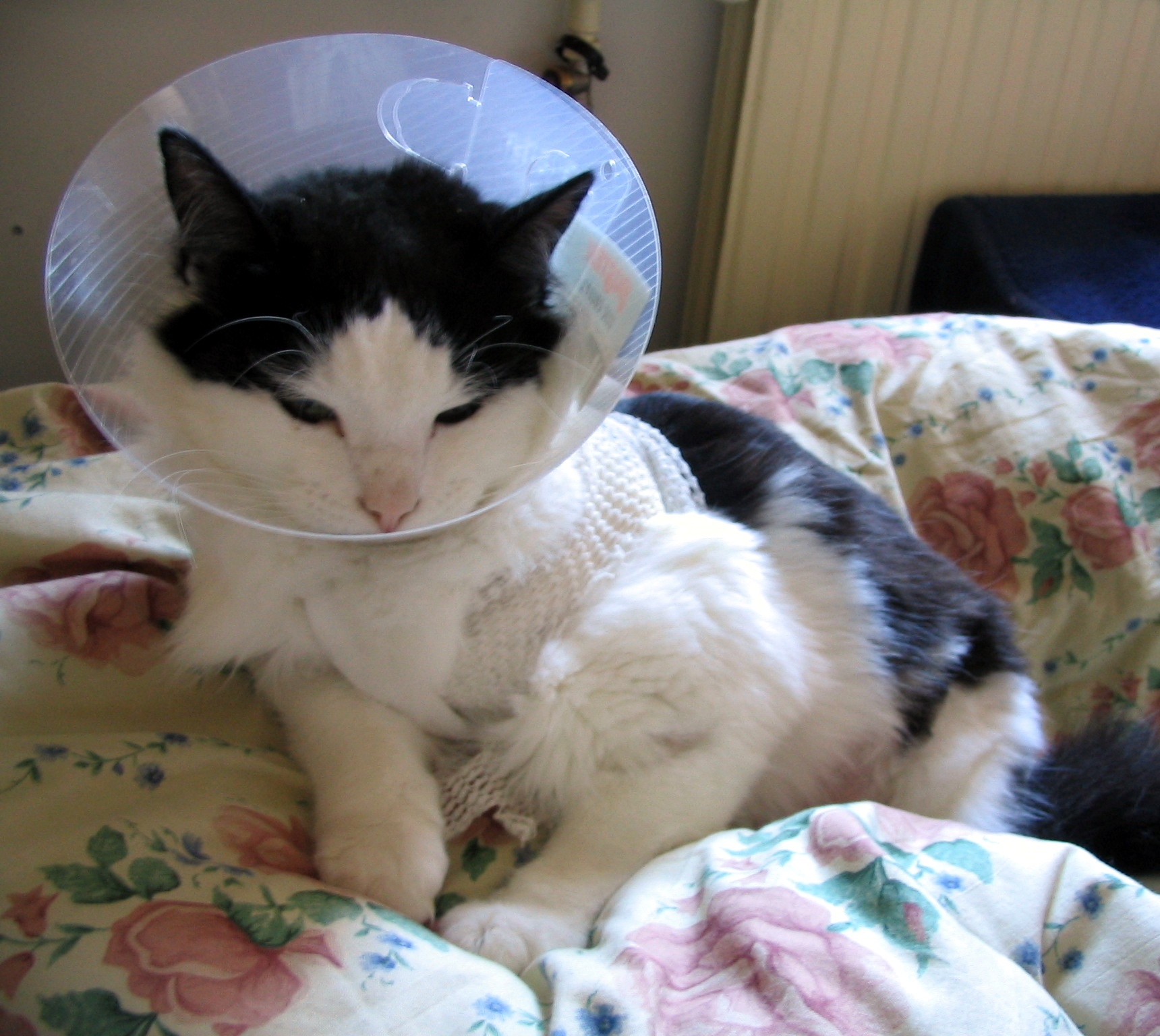
A cat with an Elizabethan collar

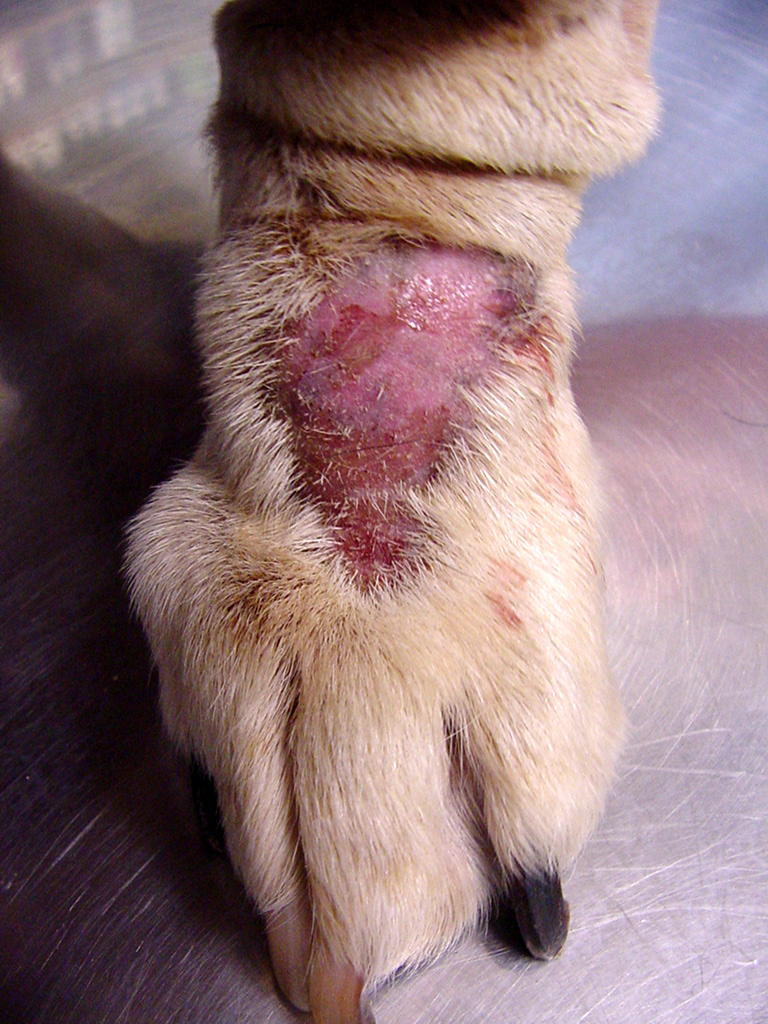
Lick granuloma from excessive licking

It has been long observed that the licking of their wounds by dogs might be beneficial. Indeed, a dog's saliva is bactericidal against the bacteria Escherichia coli and Streptococcus canis, although not against coagulase-positive Staphylococcus or Pseudomonas aeruginosa. Wound licking is also important in other animals. Removal of the salivary glands of mice and rats slows wound healing, and communal licking of wounds among rodents accelerates wound healing. Communal licking is common in several primate species. In macaques, hair surrounding a wound and any dirt is removed, and the wound is licked, healing without infection.

An Elizabethan collar may be used on pet animals to prevent them from biting an injury or excessively licking it, which can cause a lick granuloma. These lesions are often infected by pathogenic bacteria such as Staphylococcus intermedius. Horses that lick wounds may become infected by a stomach parasite, Habronema, a type of nematode worm. The rabies virus may be transmitted between animals, such as the kudu antelopes by wound licking of wounds with residual infectious saliva.

== In humans ==
There are many legends involving healing wounds by licking them or applying saliva. Saint Magdalena de Pazzi is said to have cured a nun of sores and scabs in 1589 by licking her limbs. The Roman Emperor Vespasian is said to have performed a healing of a blind man using his saliva. Pliny the Elder in his Natural History reported that a fasting woman's saliva is an effective cure for bloodshot eyes. In the Hebrew Bible saliva is associated with uncleanliness; however, in the Gospels there are three incidents where Jesus uses saliva to heal (Mark 7:33, Mark 8:23, John 9:6). Köstenberger suggests "by using saliva to cure a man, Jesus claims to possess unusual spiritual authority."

There are potential health hazards in wound licking due to infection risk, especially in immunocompromised patients. Human saliva contains a wide variety of bacteria that are harmless in the mouth, but that may cause significant infection if introduced into a wound. A notable case was a diabetic man who licked his bleeding thumb following a minor bicycle accident, and subsequently had to have the thumb amputated after it became infected with Eikenella corrodens from his saliva.

== Licking of people's wounds by animals ==
=== History and legend ===
Dog saliva has been said by many cultures to have curative powers in people. "Langue de chien, langue de médecin" is a French saying meaning "A dog's tongue is a doctor's tongue", and a Latin quote that "Lingua canis dum lingit vulnus curat" or "A dog's saliva can heal your wound" appears in a thirteenth-century manuscript. In Ancient Greece, dogs at the shrine of Aesculapius were trained to lick patients, and snake saliva was also applied to wounds. Saint Roch in the Middle Ages was said to have been cured of a plague of sores by licking from his dog. The Assyrian Queen Semiramis is supposed to have attempted to resurrect the slain Armenian king Ara the Beautiful by having the dog god Aralez lick his wounds. In the Scottish Highlands in the nineteenth century, dog saliva was believed to be effective for treating wounds and sores. In the Gospel of Luke (16:19-31), Lazarus the Beggar's sores are licked by dogs, although no curative effects are reported by the Evangelist.

=== Risks ===
As with the licking of wounds by people, wound licking by animals carries a risk of infection. Allowing pet cats to lick open wounds can cause cellulitis and sepsis due to bacterial infections. Licking of open wounds by dogs could transmit rabies if the dog is infected with rabies, although this is said by the CDC to be rare. Dog saliva has been reported to complicate the healing of ulcers. Another issue is the possibility of an allergy to proteins in the saliva of pets, such as Fel d 1 in cat allergy and Can f 1 in dog allergy. Cases of serious infection following the licking of wounds by pets include:

- Dog
  - A diabetic man who was infected by Pasteurella dagmatis due to the licking of his injured toe by his dog, causing a spinal infection.
  - A woman recovering from knee surgery suffered a persistent infection of the knee with Pasteurella after her dog licked a small wound on her toe.
  - A dog lick to an Australian woman's minor burn caused sepsis and necrosis due to Capnocytophaga canimorsus infection, resulting in the loss of all her toes, fingers and a leg.
  - C. canimorsus caused acute kidney failure due to sepsis in a man whose open hand wound was licked by his dog.
  - A 68-year-old man died from sepsis and necrotizing fasciitis after a wound was licked by his dog.
  - A patient with a perforated eardrum developed meningitis after his dog passed on a Pasteurella multocida infection by licking his ear.
- Cat
  - A woman recovering from surgery for endometrial cancer suffered from Pasteurella multocida infection causing an abscess after her cat licked the incision.
  - A blood donor whose cat licked her chapped fingers passed on Pasteurella infection to a 74-year-old transfusion recipient.
  - A seven-week-old boy contracted meningitis due to Pasteurella from contact with pet saliva.

== Idiomatic use ==
To "lick your wounds" means to "withdraw temporarily while recovering from a defeat". The phrase was spoken by Antony in John Dryden's seventeenth century play All for Love:

They look on us at distance, and, like curs
Scaped from the lion's paws, they bay far off
And lick their wounds, and faintly threaten war.
