= Auguste Hippolyte Collard =

French photographer

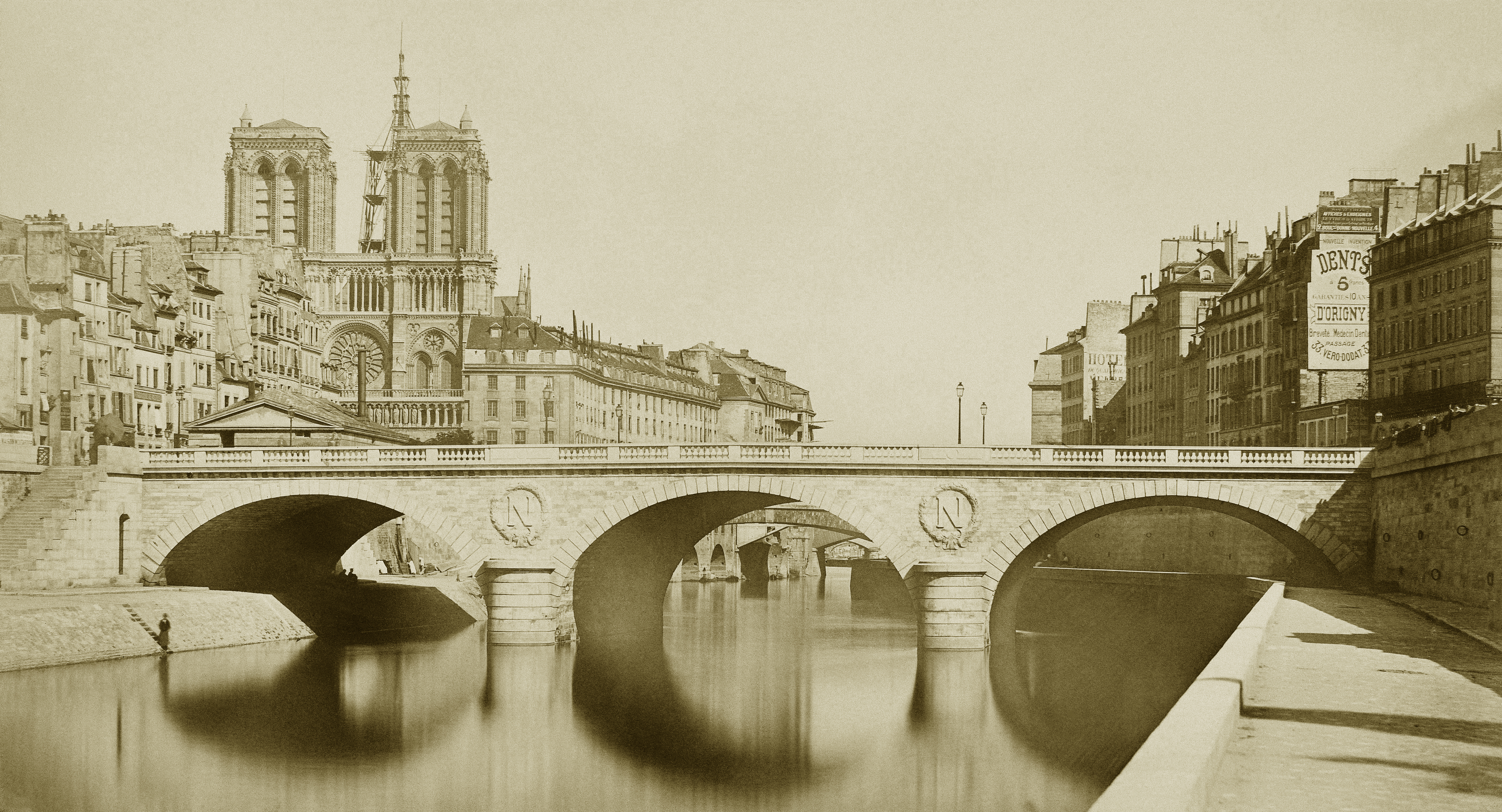
A photograph of Pont Saint-Michel taken by Auguste Hippolyte Collard in 1859, two years after its construction.

Auguste Hippolyte Collard (c. 1812 – c. 1897) was an early French photographer. During the Second Empire he worked for the Ministry of Agriculture, Commerce and Public Works, documenting civil engineering projects in Paris and France, and worked with Édouard Baldus recording the expansion of the French railways.
