= Collar neighbourhood =

In topology, a branch of mathematics, a collar neighbourhood of a manifold with boundary $M$ is a neighbourhood of its boundary $\partial M$ that has the same structure as $\partial M \times [0, 1)$.

Formally, if $M$ is a differentiable manifold with boundary, $U \subset M$ is a collar neighbourhood of $M$ whenever there is a diffeomorphism $f : \partial M \times [0, 1) \to U$ such that for every $x \in \partial M$, $f (x, 0) = x$. Since $[0, 1)$ is diffeomorphic to $[0, \infty)$, it is equivalent to take a diffeomorphism $f : \partial M \times [0, \infty) \to U$.

Every differentiable manifold has a collar neighbourhood.
