= Cyril Collard (footballer) =

Australian rules footballer

Personal information
- Born: 20 September 1934
- Died: 20 December 2011 (aged 77)
- Original team: Subiaco
- Height: 173 cm (5 ft 8 in)
- Weight: 73 kg (161 lb)
- Position: Rover

Playing career^{1}
Years	Club	Games (Goals)
1957–1958	Hawthorn	13 (3)
- ^{1} Playing statistics correct to the end of 1958.

Career highlights
- Noongar Sports Award Recipient, 1998

Cyril Collard (20 September 1934 – 20 December 2011) played 13 games for Australian rules football club Hawthorn between 1957 and 1958, scoring 3 goals. He was the first Indigenous Australian to play for Hawthorn being of the Noongar people of Western Australia.

Collard started his career at Subiaco Football Club achieving top three finishes in the best and fairest award during his two seasons at the club. He moved to Melbourne in 1956 and after initially training with Collingwood he chose to play with Hawthorn. Subiaco, however refused to clear him and he sat out of football for the 1956 season until the National Football Council granted him a clearance for the 1957 season.

After retiring from professional football Collard became a professional runner reaching the final of a Stawell Gift.

He served in the Metropolitan Fire Brigade between 7 February 1958 and 3 June 1988 reaching the rank of senior fire fighter.
