= Cat bell =

Bell worn on cats' collars

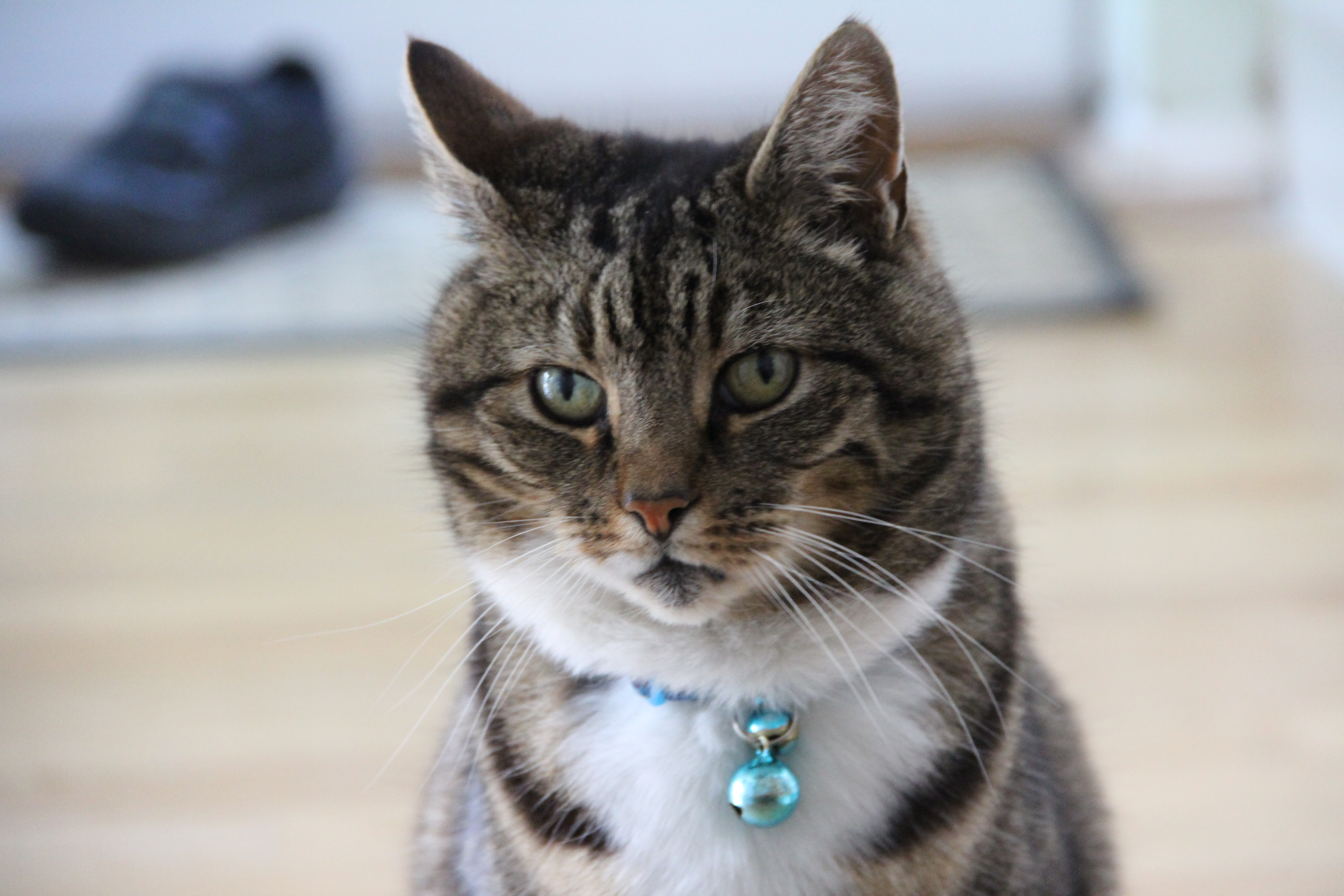
A cat with a bell on its collar.

A cat bell is a bell attached to the collar of a cat to prevent the cat from harming local wildlife.

The bell can warn potential prey of the cat's approach. Cats eventually learn to walk without ringing the bell and pet owners are therefore encouraged to regularly change the bell or attach two bells on the collar.

Attaching a bell on a cat's collar has been shown to reduce the amount of captured birds by 30–40%. With one collar, birds were found to be hunted 2.7 times less than without the collar.

Some animal care organizations claim that cat bells are irritating to cats due to their sensitive hearing, and may just confuse birds by interfering with their natural defense mechanisms. However, this claim has never been officially studied and lacks scientific merit.

Some owners worry that as well as alerting prey, a bell could alert large predators to a cat's presence, given most predators' acute hearing. However, the acute hearing of predators is good enough that it is unlikely to make a difference in practice.

== See also ==
- Belling the Cat, a historical fable
