= Marie Christine Chilver =

British SOE agent

- Marie Chilver when running her animal charity
- Born: 12 September 1920; London
- Died: 5 November 2007 (aged 87)
- Education: Sorbonne
- Employer: SOE
- Known for: British spy "Agent Fifi"

Marie Christine Chilver, known as Christine, (12 September 1920 – 5 November 2007) (Latvian: Marija Kristīne Čilvere), also known by the codename Agent Fifi, was a British secret agent in World War II. Originally recruited after escaping the Nazis and helping a British airman return to England, she worked for the Special Operations Executive (SOE) assessing and testing the security awareness of trainee secret agents.

== Early life ==
Chilver was born in London, England, to an English father, a correspondent for The Times of London, and Latvian mother. Raised in Latvia, she was educated at a German school in Riga before moving to Paris, France in 1940. When Paris fell to Nazi Germany she was interned in the Frontstalag 142 internment camp at Besançon, where escaped the harrison prison and reached England in 1941, helping a wounded RAF Flight Lieutenant Simpson during her journey. Meanwhile her mother and sister had fled to Sweden from Soviet-occupied Latvia, where their property had been confiscated by the Russians. The pilot, flight lieutenant Simpson, suspected Chilver was a foreign spy, as she seemed too well fed when they met. His suspicions were found to be unsubstantiated, but Chilver had already come to the notice of British authorities.

== Special Operations Executive ==
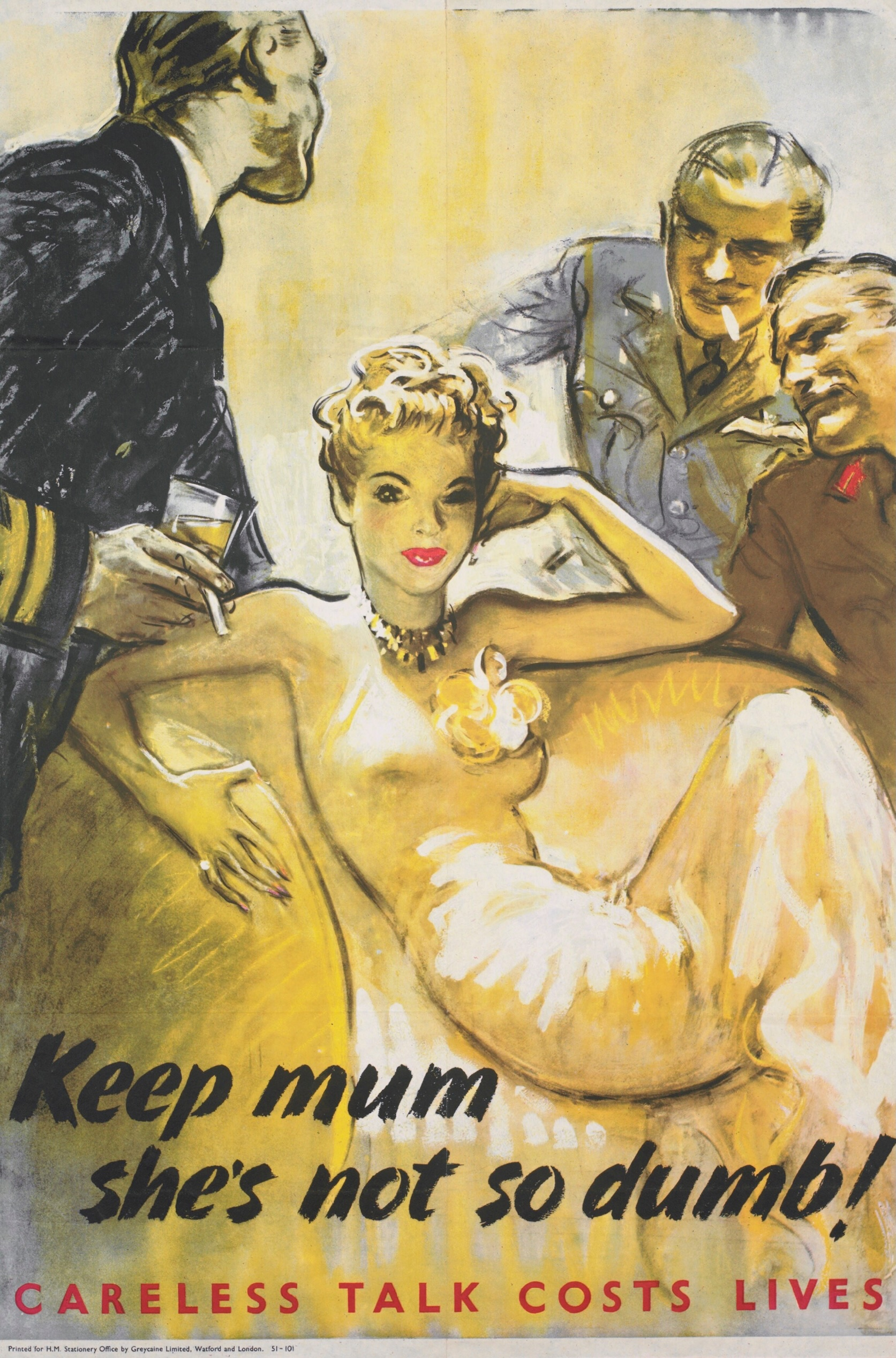
"Keep Mum - She's Not so Dumb! - Careless Talk Costs Lives" - One of the posters about secrecy from WWII

In 1942, Chilver joined the SOE, and was given the task of assessing and testing the security awareness of trainee agents while they were on 96-hour training missions in the UK. Her code name was "Fifi", and she had a cover identity of Christine Collard. It was rumoured that the SOE employed agents who would attempt to seduce men to persuade them to reveal their secrets; Chilvers reports show that flattery and attention were all that some trainee agents needed for them to reveal everything they knew. As a result of her reports, agents were sacked from SOE.

Her wartime documents were declassified and released by the National Archives in 2014.

== Retirement ==
After leaving the SOE, Chilver lived in Chelsea. While in Chelsea, she studied French at Birkbeck College, London, graduating from there with First Class Honours in French in 1960. Later she moved to the Wye Valley, living in Lydney, Gloucestershire. She spent much of her retirement with her friend, the widowed Jean "Alex" Felgate, a retired SOE intelligence officer. Chilver founded Dzīvnieku Draugs ("Animal Friends") in Latvia, an animal charity and sanctuary. She died on 5 November 2007.

== Bibliography ==
- Māris Puķītis (23 April 2001). "LinkBijušie aktīvisti "Dzīvnieku draugu" uzskata par komerciālu iestādi". Vakara Avīze Vakara Ziņas: 11–12. ISSN 1407-4931. (Latvian)
- Kate Pankhurst (8 September 2016). Agent Fifi. Bloomsbury. ISBN 978-1-4088-7697-8.
