= George Collard =

Australian rules footballer

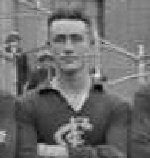
- Collard in 1935

Personal information
- Full name: George Sydney Collard
- Born: 29 February 1916; Bendigo, Victoria
- Died: 18 June 1983 (aged 67)
- Original team: Sandhurst
- Height: 187 cm (6 ft 2 in)
- Weight: 84 kg (185 lb)
- Position: Half-forward

Playing career^{1}
Years	Club	Games (Goals)
1935–1938	Carlton	16 (8)
1938–1942	South Melbourne	56 (49)
Total		72 (57)
- ^{1} Playing statistics correct to the end of 1942.

George Sydney Collard (29 February 1916 – 18 June 1983) was an Australian rules footballer who played with Carlton and South Melbourne in the Victorian Football League (VFL).
