= Elizabethan collar =

Protective medical device worn by an animal

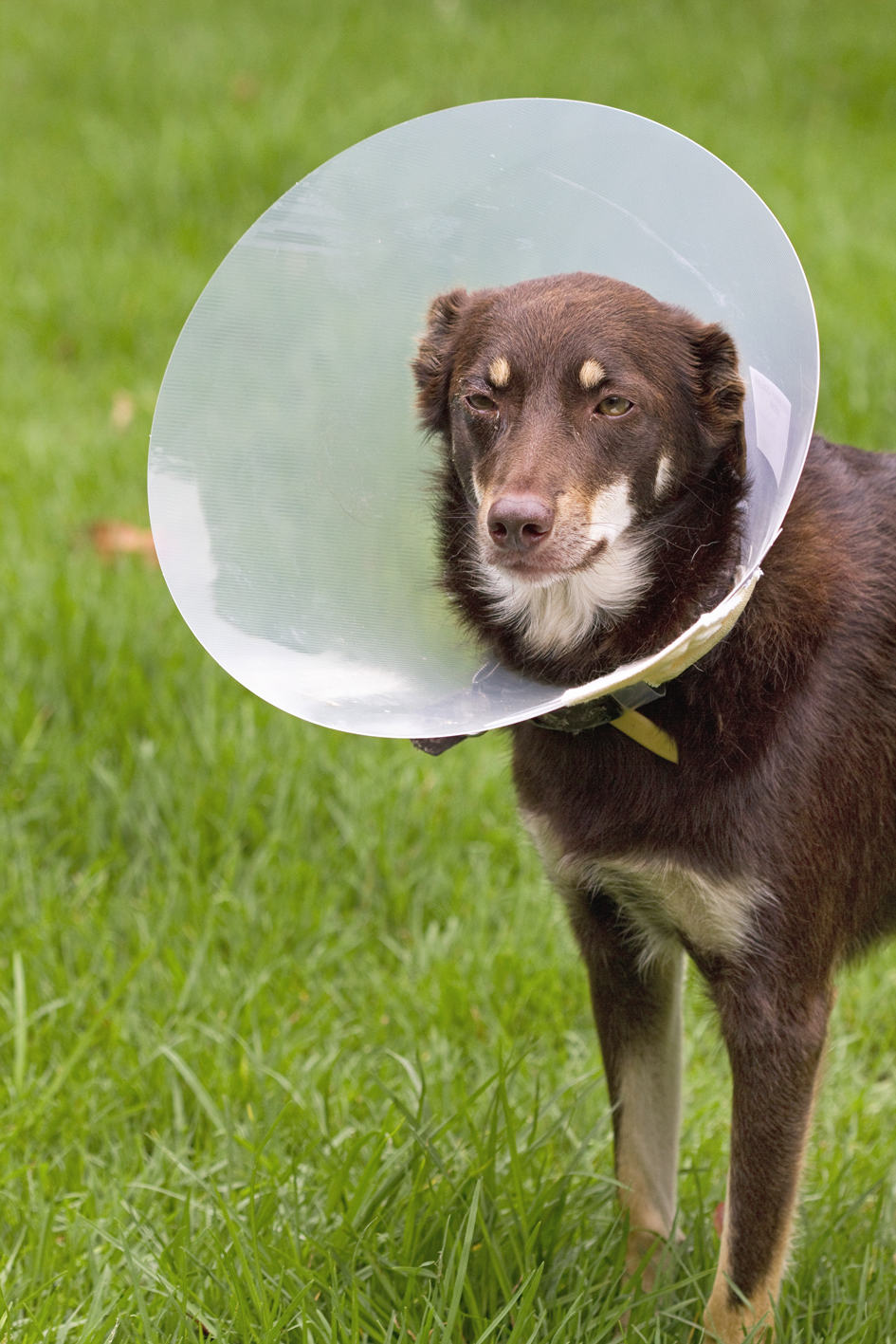
An Australian Kelpie wearing a plastic Elizabethan collar to help an eye infection heal

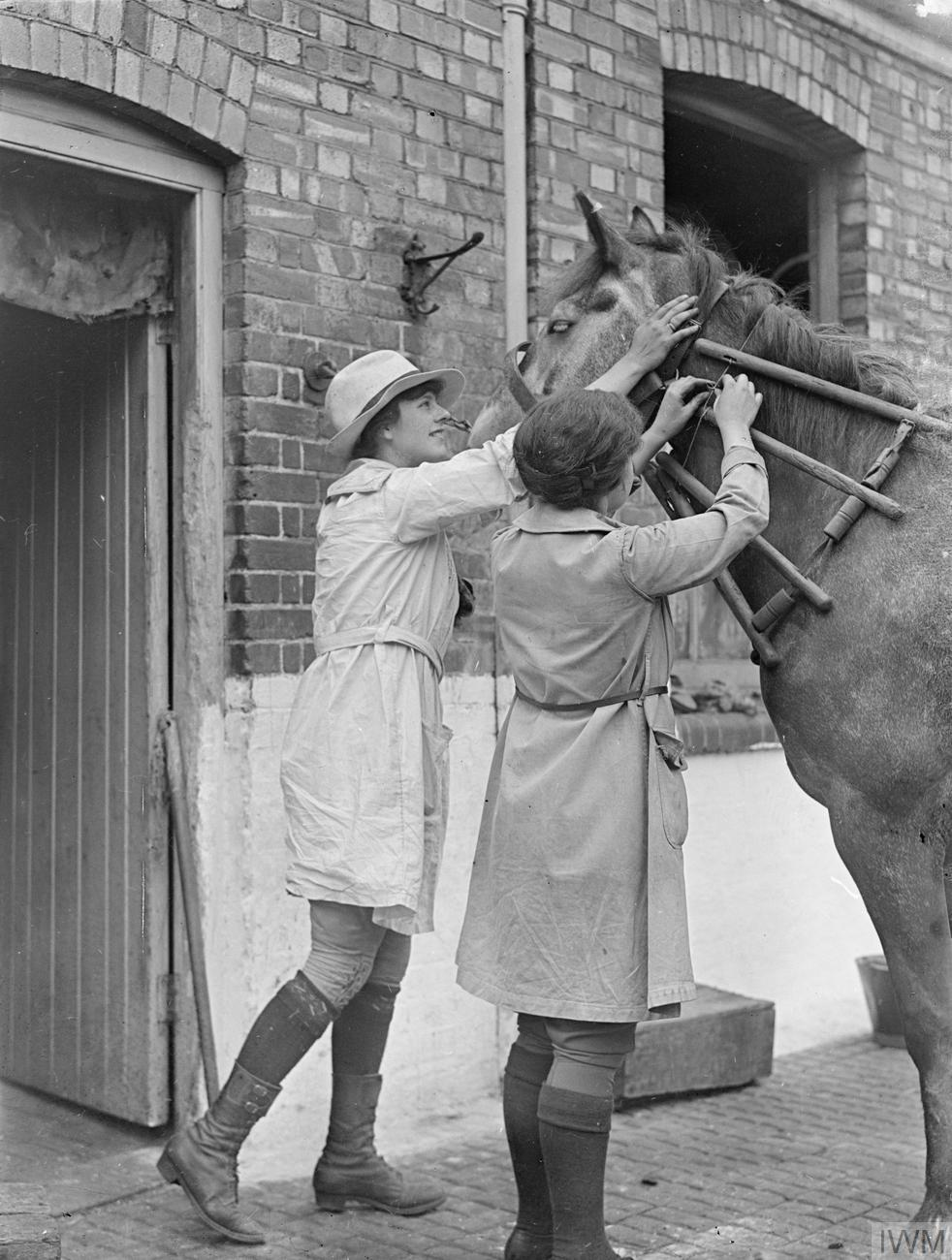
A veterinary surgeon affixing a wooden neck cradle to a horse to prevent it from biting its wounds (c. 1915-18)

An Elizabethan collar, E collar, buster collar, pet ruff, recovery cone or pet cone (sometimes humorously called a treat funnel, lamp-shade, radar dish, dog-saver, collar cone, or the cone of shame) is a protective medical device worn by an animal, usually a cat or dog. Shaped like a truncated cone, its purpose is to prevent the animal from biting or licking at its body or scratching at its head or neck while wounds or injuries heal. The collars are named from the ruffs worn in the Elizabethan era.

The device is generally attached to the pet's usual collar with strings or tabs passed through holes punched in the sides of the plastic. The neck of the collar should be short enough to let the animal eat and drink. Although most pets adjust to them quite well, others will not eat or drink with the collar in place and the collar is temporarily removed for meals.

While purpose-made collars can be purchased from veterinarians or pet stores, they can also be made from plastic and cardboard or by using plastic flowerpots, wastebaskets, buckets or lampshades. Modern collars might involve soft fabric trim along the edges to increase comfort and velcro surfaces for ease of attachment and removal.

== Types of collars ==
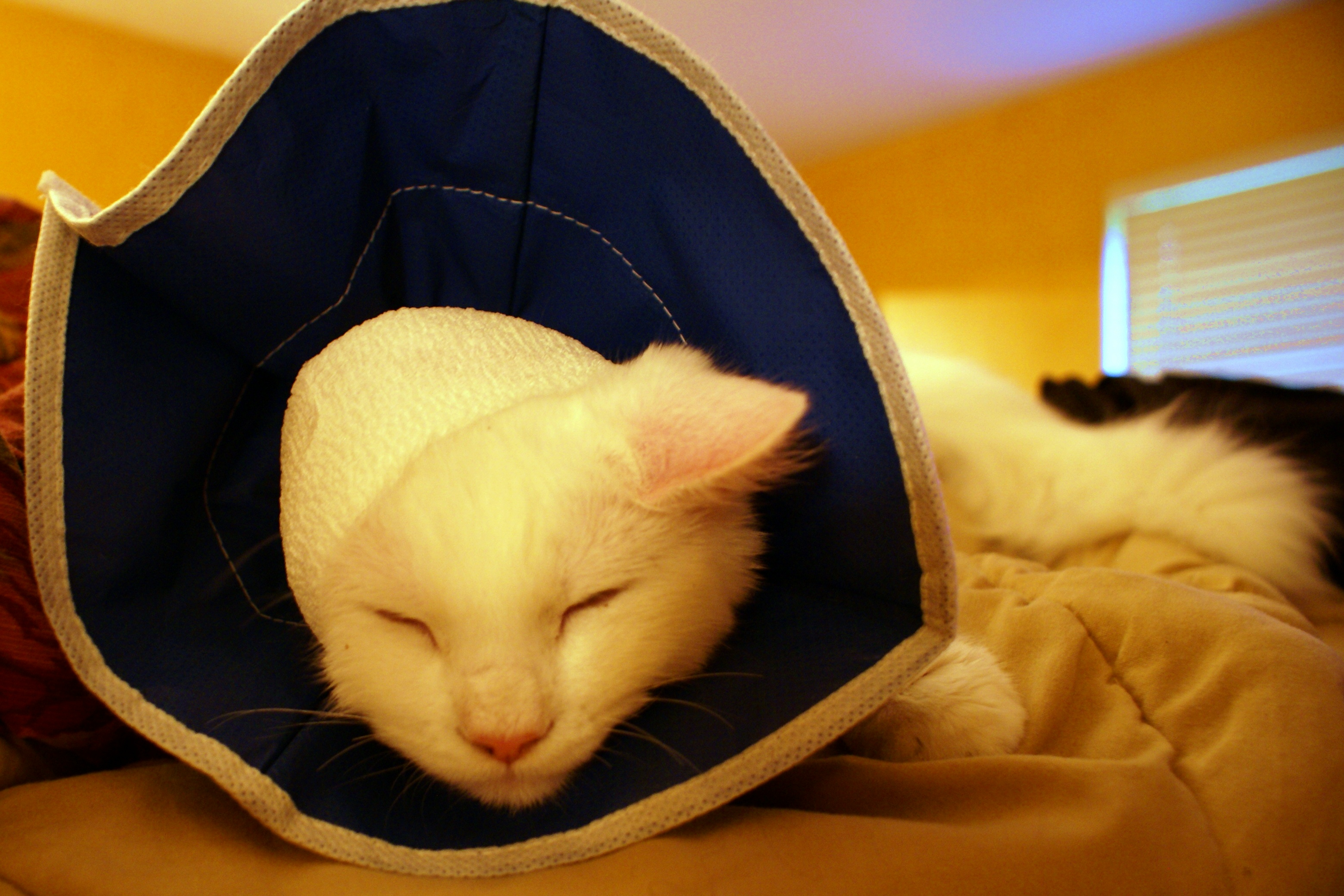
Cat wearing a soft fabric collar

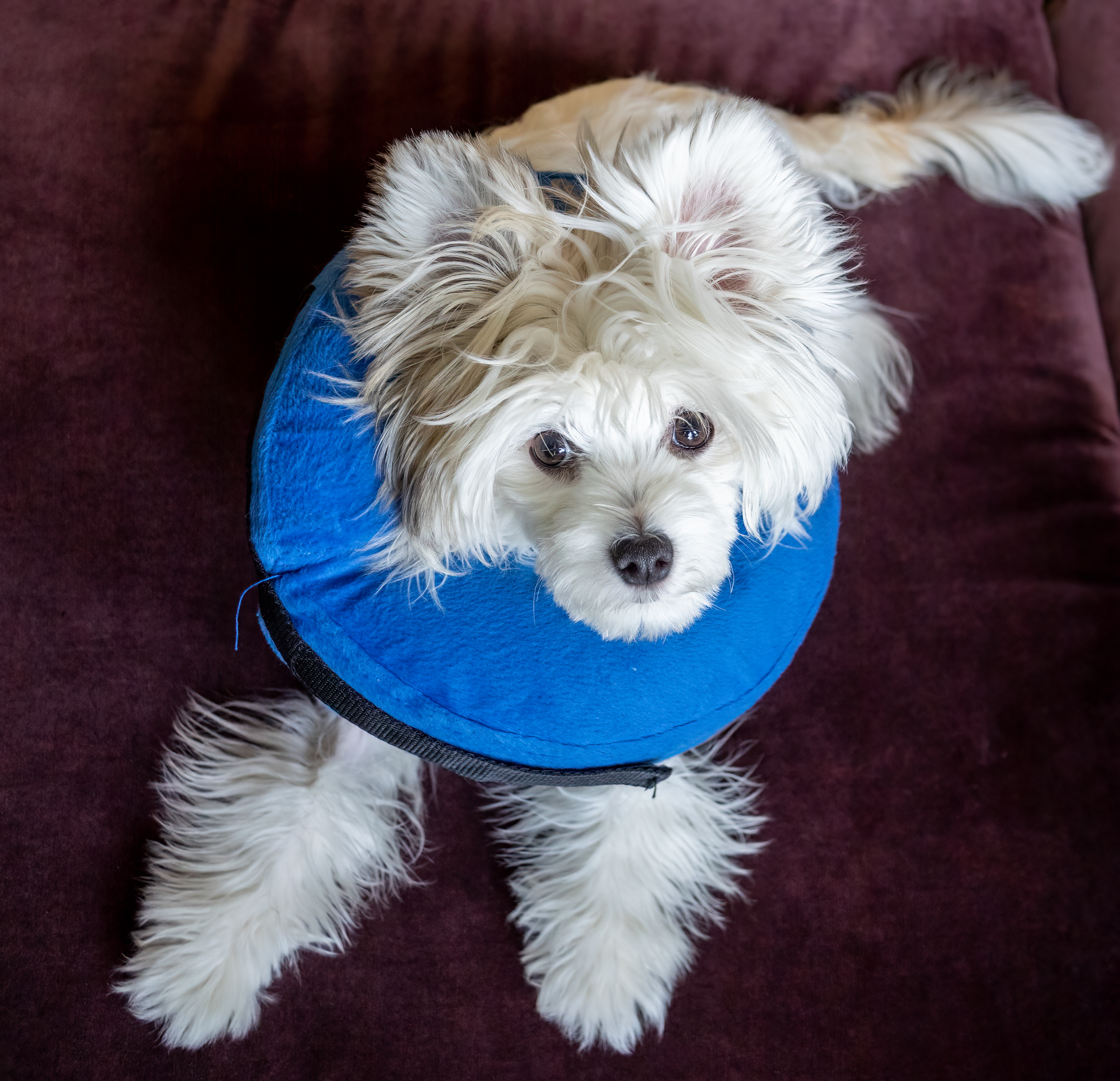
Puppy wearing an inflatable collar while recovering from spaying.

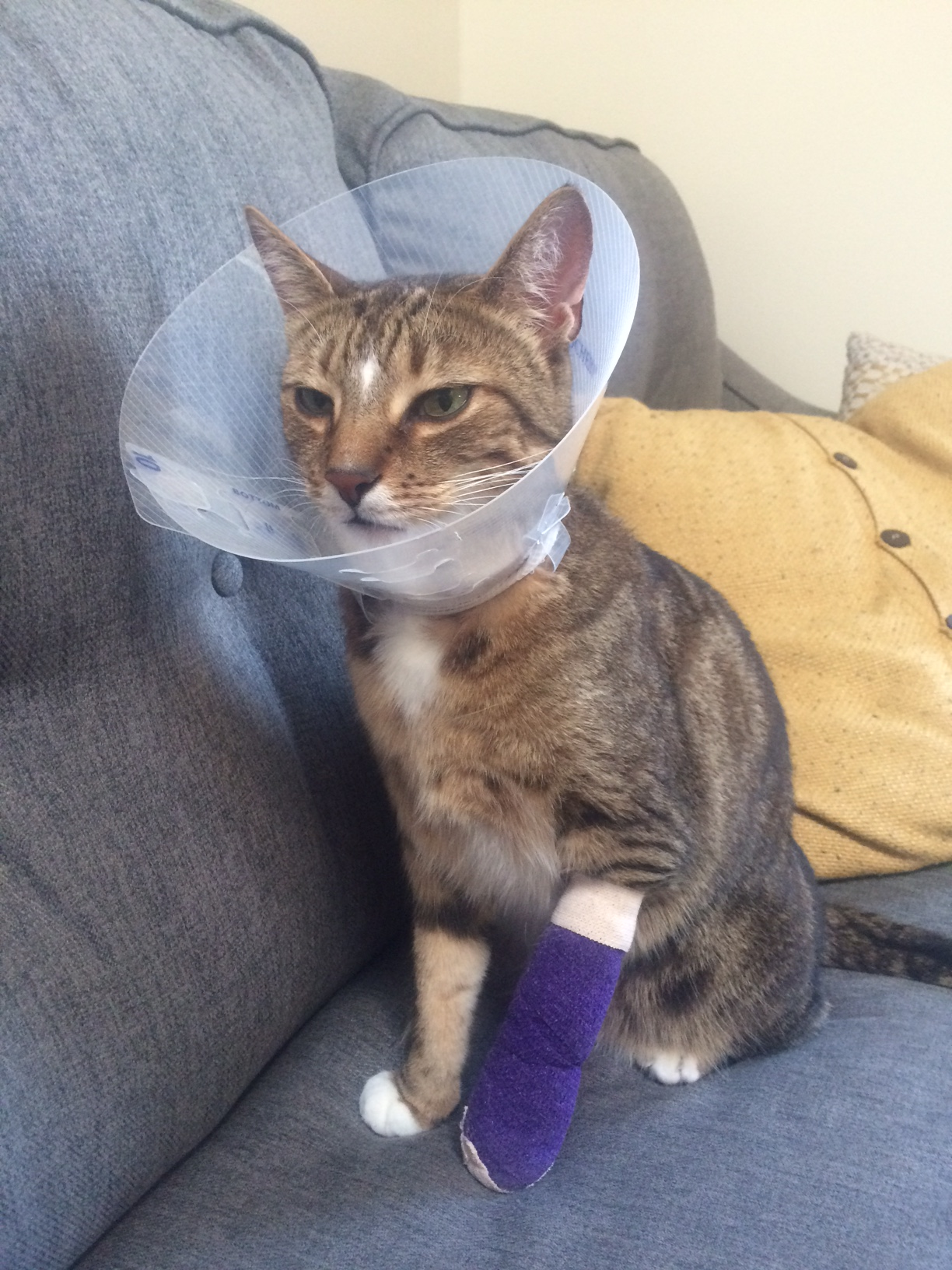
Cat with a plastic collar

=== Plastic ===
Made of low-density polyethylene, these collars are somewhat firm and prevent the animal from reaching an infected area by acting as a wall. These are usually secured to the neck of an animal by the use of a cotton padding roll through small loops at the base of the cone.

=== Soft fabric ===
Serving the same purpose as a plastic collar but being much easier on the animal, these collars are made of soft fabric and tighten through the use of Velcro or strings. While it may be more comfortable, these cones usually impede the vision of animals more than the plastic version.

=== Inflatable ===
Made with synthetic plastic that is suitable for inflating, these collars completely restrict the movements of the animals from reaching an affected area. These collars can be covered by soft fabric, and unlike the soft fabric collar, these do not impede the vision of the animal. The collars are secured through the use of velcro or a cord

=== Cervical ===
Mimicking the same cervical collars humans wear, these collars serve the same purpose of completely preventing the neck from moving or turning. These collars are the most restrictive type, and are mostly used for extreme situations such as grievous body injuries or neck injuries. The collars are fastened by the veterinarian, and owners of animals should adjust the collars only under the instruction of the vet.

=== Avian spherical collar ===
Made of medical grade polycarbonate plastic (Lexan), these collars are spherical and cover parts of the body of birds instead of acting as a barrier like the other types of collars.

These collars range in size to accommodate a wide variety of bird species. Birds wearing these collars are often grounded and unable to fly until the time that they are cured.

== Medical reasons for Elizabethan collars ==
=== Injury or surgery ===
In order to prevent the animal from irritating a wound or removing stitches while self grooming, Elizabethan collars are used to either prevent the animal from licking/biting its wound or using its limbs to scratch their head, eyes, or ears. The collar can also be used to restrain animals with self-destructive habits, either from poor training or mental illness.

=== Allergies or flea treatment ===
In addition to medicine such as ointments and pills, Elizabethan collars are necessary when dealing with an animal that is suffering from an allergy reaction. The main reasons are to prevent the animal from ingesting any of the medicine being applied on the skin, or to prevent it from harming itself in the infected area.

=== Viruses and fungi ===
In addition to preventing the animal from harming themselves or ingesting medicine being applied on their skins, Elizabethan collars also prevent the animal from further spreading the infection due to it licking, biting, or scratching itself elsewhere after touching the infection area. Hot spots, an infection that could be attributed to multiple reasons, are the most common infections that could be spread due to an animal licking or scratching the area.

== Side effects ==
The use of the Elizabethan collar has been shown in one study to increase the number of fleas found on the bodies of flea-infested cats compared to flea-infested cats that did not wear the collar. This is attributed to the collar's preventing the animal from being able to properly groom.

Some animals can be allergic to the plastic often used in the collars. Alternatives include inflatable and soft fabric collars.

== See also ==
- Cat collar
- Dog booties
- Dog collar
- Muzzle (device)
- Neck brace
- Rug (animal covering), or dog/cat coat
