= Collar (animal) =

Harness for animals

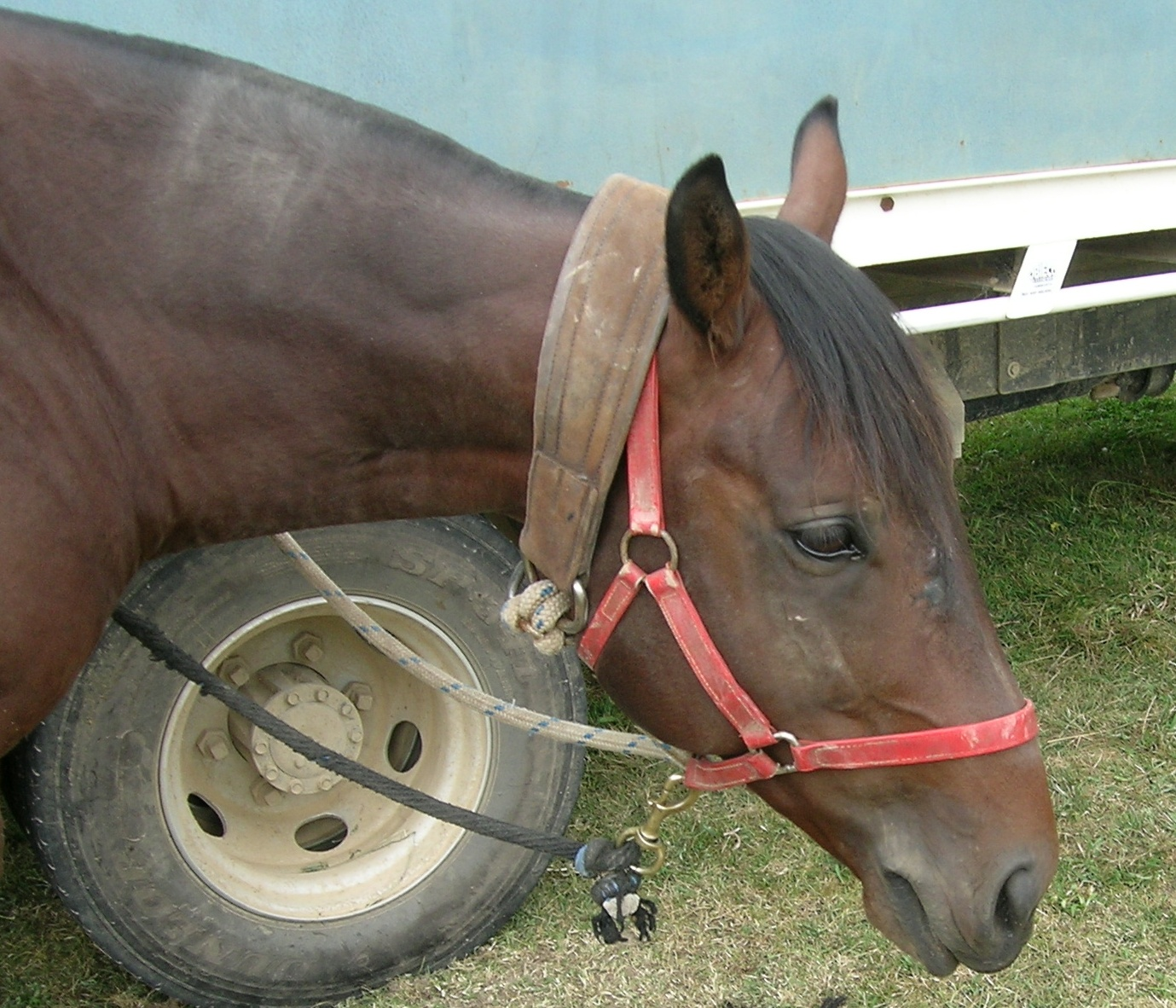
Tie up collar correctly used with a headcollar on a stallion

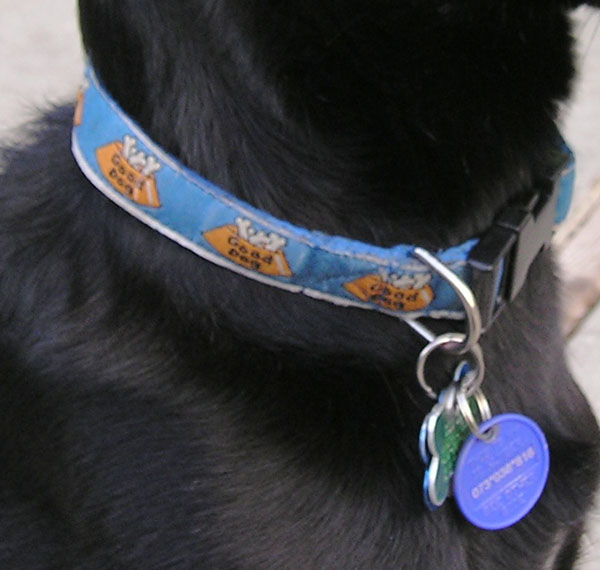
Nylon quick-release buckle collar on a dog with identification and medical tags.

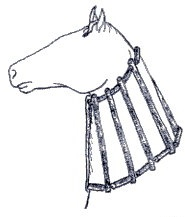
Wooden neck cradle

An animal collar is a device that attaches to the neck of an animal to allow it to be harnessed or restrained.

== Types of collars ==
=== Pet collar ===
A piece of material put around the neck of certain pet animals, such as dogs, cats, or pigs, for control, identification, or other purposes. Identification tags and medical information is often placed on collars. Collars are also useful for controlling the animal, as they provide a handle for grabbing or a means of leading. Similar collars are used with non-pet animals, such as zoo animals and livestock. Pet collars can be made of leather, nylon or metal. Metal collars are normally used for larger dogs. They can come with traditional or quick-release buckles. Collars are sometimes used for fashion purposes.

=== Cat collar ===
Similar to dog collars, but often include a bell to warn of the cat's presence. Collars used on cats are smaller and thinner than traditional dog collars. They can be made of leather, nylon, or other types of materials. Some cat collars are impregnated with flea, tick, and mosquito repellents. There is a longstanding myth that breakaway cat collars are safer than buckle or elastic cat collars, but research reported in the New York Times found this to be untrue. According to a different study, cats are much more likely to be injured by fighting with other cats or being hit by a car.

=== Anti-bark dog collar/bark control collar ===
These collars are predominantly used as a training mechanism. There are a few different types of mechanisms which can be incorporated into anti-bark collars:

Citronella
The citronella collar releases a spray of citronella-scented liquid when the wearer barks. Most dogs find this scent unpleasant and will resist further barking.
Static shock
This collar emits a shock through two metal prongs that touch animal's neck. The shock will increase in intensity if the barking continues. This kind of collar is illegal to sell in the UK but is popular in the USA.
Sonic
Dogs can hear much higher pitches than humans. This collar sends an unpleasant pitch when the dog barks. This collar is tested for each dog to ensure that the pitch is perfectly tuned.
Vibration
These collars often feature both sound and vibration. Instead of using sonic, they use a low pitched beep when barking begins. This is soon followed by a vibration if barking continues. The vibration is harmless.

=== Training collar/shock collar ===
These collars administer an electric shock to the animal in training, in order to reinforce commands and eliminate any bad habits. It may be combined with an "invisible fence," a signal wire surrounding the dog's permitted area. The dog receives a shock if it strays too near the perimeter.

=== Choke collars ===
Choke collars are also a type of training collars. They are made of different materials with high resistance, such as metal or various composites. This type of collar is suitable for obedience training as it tightens around the neck of the animal if it pulls. It is mainly used on dogs.

=== Insect collar/flea collar ===
Impregnated with chemicals that repel or kill external parasites, they are often a supplementary collar worn in addition to the conventional buckle collar. The effectiveness of flea collars is arguable. However, to be effective the flea collar must be changed every 7-8 months. Although they are convenient because of their cost and accessibility, the insecticide within the collar is most effective in the neck and face area and does not provide full and complete coverage. Flea collars are considered to be more effective in preventing infestation with external parasites rather than treating an active infestation. Flea collars are best used when a proper disinfestation has been performed, both indoor and outdoor. These collars are primarily worn by cats and dogs. A number of the insecticides used in these flea collars are toxic.

=== Pig hunting dog collar ===
This collar integrates a wide collar and a breastplate for dogs that hunt pigs. They are made from multiple layers of extra tough fabric or leather to protect the vital carotid artery and jugular vein of pig hunting dogs should they be attacked. Some of the pig hunting dog collars come in the form of a full-body protection collar. These collars provide good protection for the dog's chest, neck and rib cage.

=== Elizabethan collar ===
Often made of plastic, this collar is shaped like a cone and used to prevent an animal from self-harm, such as a licking at a wound.

=== Tie-up collar ===
Used for bulls and other cattle, this may be a chain (sometimes covered in plastic hose), or a collar of heavy leather or synthetic material fastened with a heavy duty buckle.

=== Tracking collar ===
Used for tracking animal migration or to locate lost pets. The GPS tracker in the collar works as follows. It connects to satellites and transmits location coordinates to the mobile application, which will be displayed on the smartphone if the Internet connection is available. Some collars combine GPS with radio signals to transmit information to the intended receiver. Most integrate GPS with communications networks (LBS) by sending information to your computer or mobile device.

=== Horse collars ===
Full collar/Horse collar
Used for horses or other draught animals, this consists of a robustly constructed leather device stuffed with straw or other material that sits comfortably on the animal's shoulders around its lower neck, supporting a set of hames that transfer the draught forces from the animal to the traces.
Breast collar/breastplate
The breast collar has two forms: One is a simpler type of draught collar for lighter loads, consisting of a padded strap around the chest of the animal. The other is similar, but is attached to a saddle and used when riding a horse to prevent the saddle from sliding back.
Horse tie-up collar
A collar designed to teach horses to tie up and to tie stallions at public events. It is constructed from double-stitched wide leather (sometimes fleece lined), with heavy duty dees sewn into each end. The collar is placed on a horse just behind the poll strap of a headcollar (headstall) which is used in conjunction, and a strong rope passes through the headcollar to secure the two dees so that the horse's wind is not impaired in any way. This manner of application will reduce the likelihood of the collar slipping and injuring or choking the horse. Sometimes used for tethering horses, they are expensive and are potentially dangerous if the horse should become entangled in the tether or frightened, etc.
Mare collar
A simple buckled neck strap that has a plastic ID tag attached.
Headcollar or halter
Not strictly a collar, this consists of straps around the head for tethering, tying or leading horses or other livestock.
Cribbing or wind-sucking collar
The "Nutcracker" collar is an adjustable strap with a lightweight aluminium 'nutcracker'. It is placed around a horse's neck to help prevent windsucking by stopping the flexing of the neck muscles whenever it tries to suck in air.
Cornell collar
A device developed for use on racehorses to prevent dorsal displacement of the soft palate during racing.
Neck cradle
Used on horses to prevent them chewing at injuries and dressings.
Neck strap

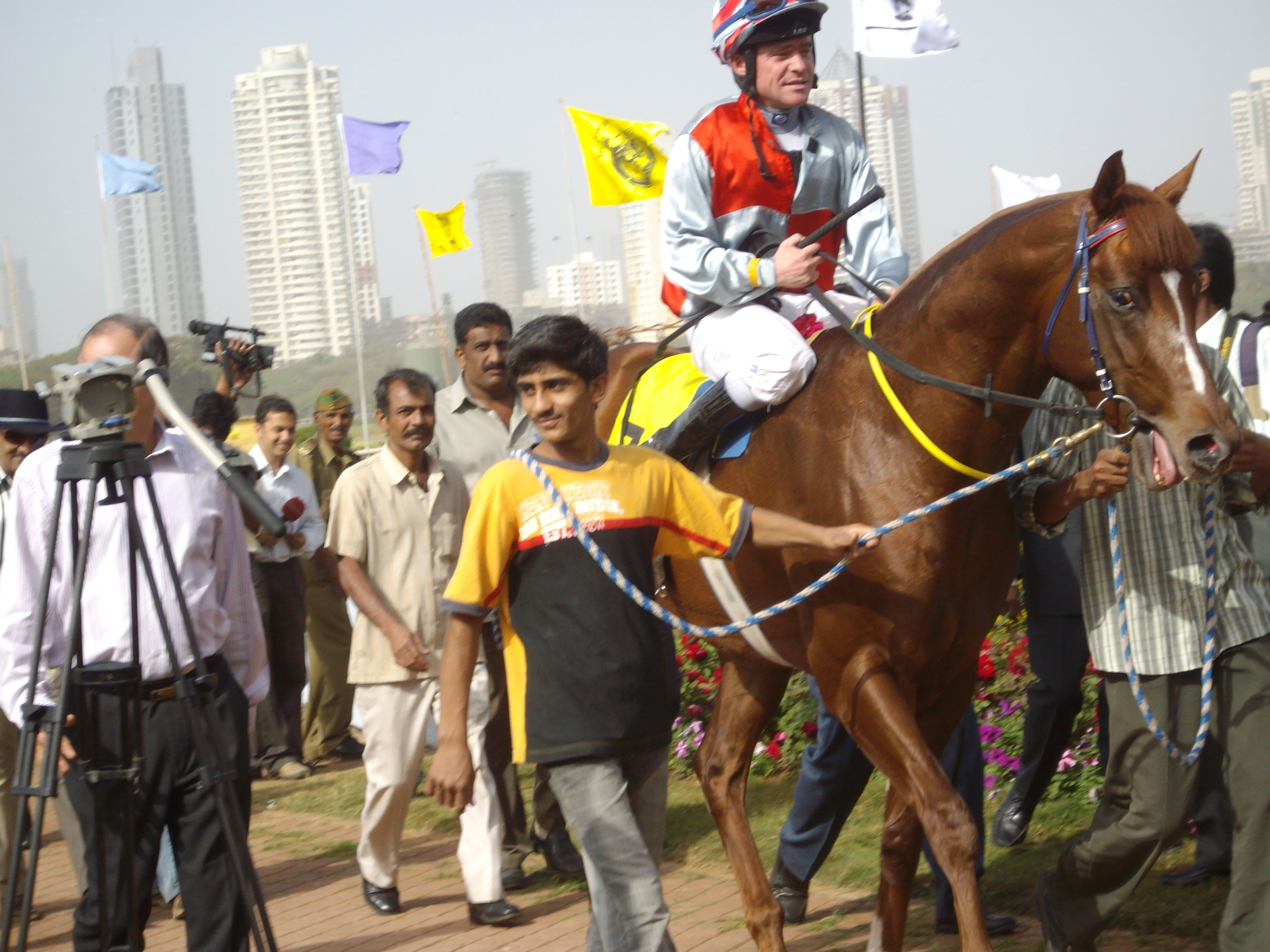
A yellow neck strap on a racehorse.

A simple narrow leather strap buckled around a horse's neck to give security to jockeys and other riders. Another form of neck strap (or rope) is the one used by cowboys when roping. This style is shorter and placed closer to the horse's head with the lariat passing through in order to keep the horse facing the calf after it has been roped. It also refers to the part of a martingale, which buckles around the horse's neck. A loose neck collar is also used on harness racing horses when the reins are passed through.

=== Safety collars ===
Safety collars are designed for pets that live in crates or that might get tangled in tree branches. There is a particular type of safety collar which is intended for both dogs and cats. Breakaway collars feature a design that releases quickly when a small amount of pressure is applied, such as a cat hanging from a tree branch. The clasp will release, which quickly frees the pet. However, research reported in the New York Times found that the dangers of non-breakaway collars were generally far overstated.

== See also ==
- Cat collar
- Choker
- Collar (BDSM)
- Dog collar
- Horse collar
