= Cat collar =

Item put around the neck of a cat

A cat collar is a piece of material put around the neck of a cat. People place cat collars on cats for identification, fashion, protection (as from fleas), restraint, or to warn off prey, and may be worn by cats that are indoor-only as well as cats with outdoor access.

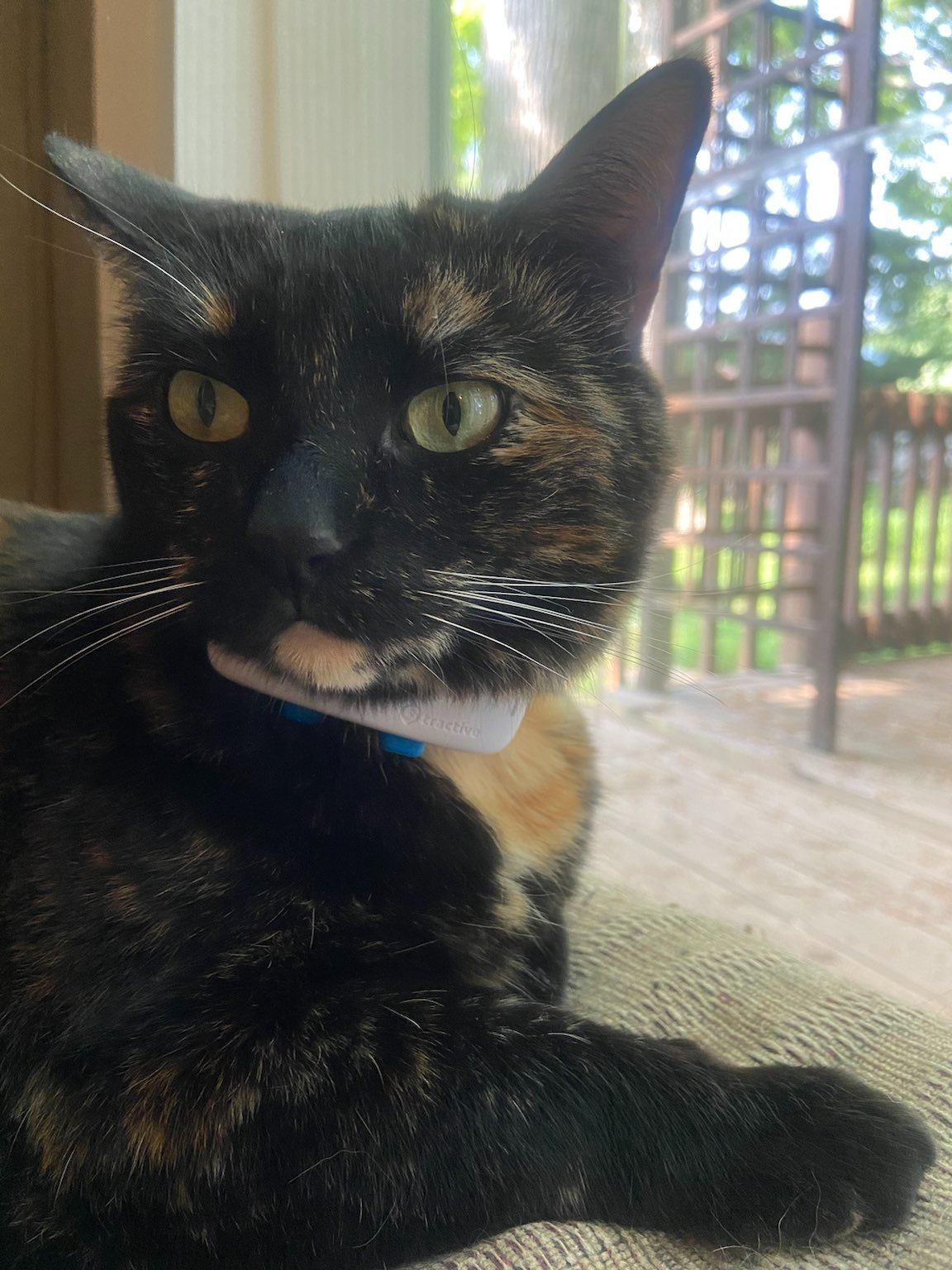
A tortoiseshell cat wearing a tracking collar.

== Types of collars ==
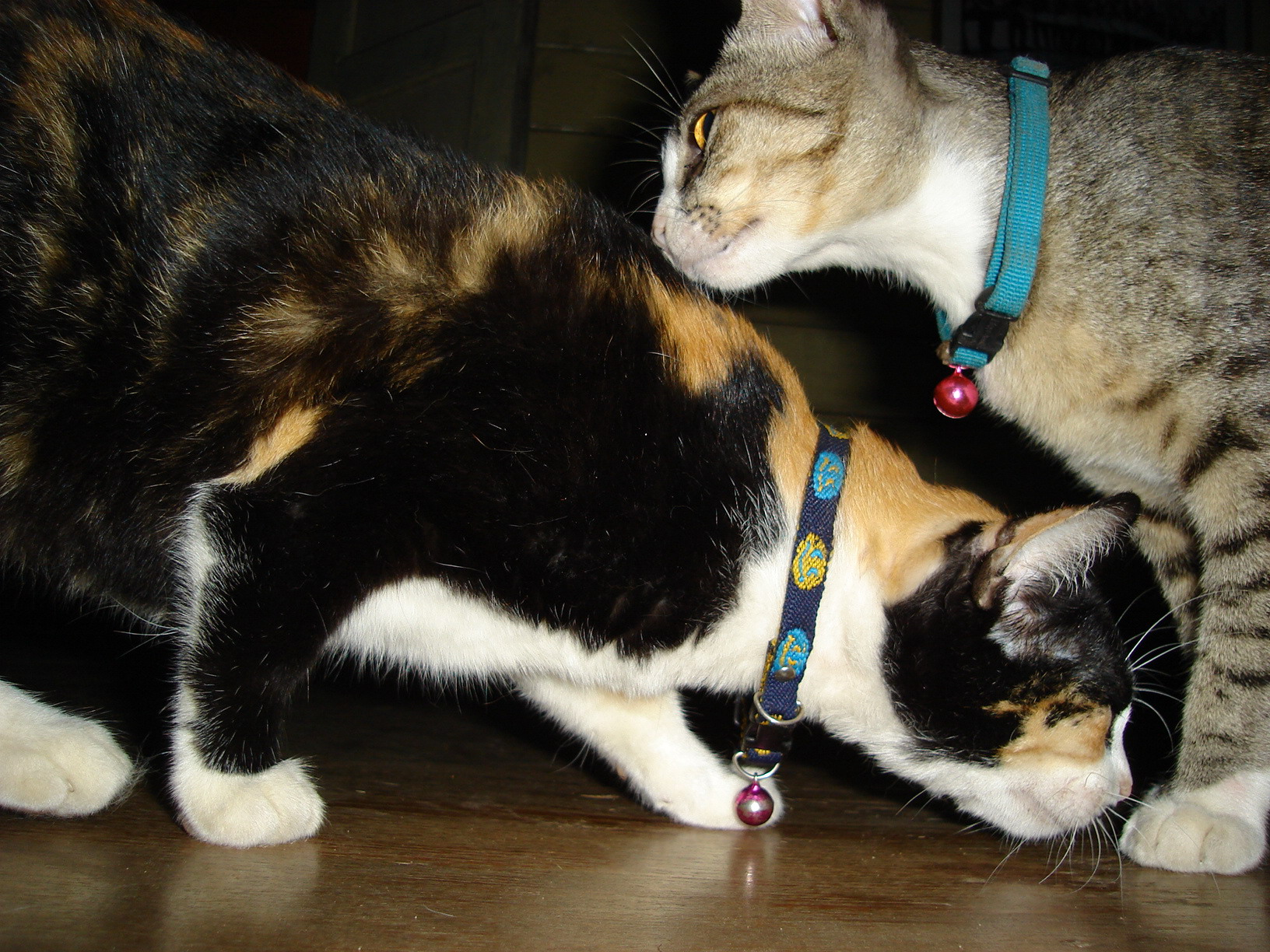
Cats wearing collars with bells

Typical cat collars may be secured on the neck of the cat via a simple buckle, an elastic strap, or a breakaway buckle. Harnesses may also be used. Elizabeth collars are cones which prevent cats from licking themselves, often used to help cats recover from injury.

=== Anti-predation collars ===
Domesticated cats are among the most significant predators of wild birds—being responsible for over a billion bird deaths every year, as well as the extinction of 22 species of bird as of 2015. Anti-predation collars may be used to reduce bird deaths from domesticated cats. These collars may include conspicuous fabrics, colors, and/or bells. A 2013 study reported on in The Atlantic showed that cats wearing anti-predation collars killed 19 times fewer birds than cats without anti-predation collars.

== Collar safety ==
As of 2021, there is ongoing debate about whether standard or breakaway collars (collars that unclasp with the application) are safer, or if cat collars are safe at all.

A 2010 study reported on in the New York Times showed that simple buckle collars are actually the safest for cats. Another study from 2013 showed that the dangers to a cat that is lost outside without a collar (or having lost its collar) were substantially greater than the danger of a cat hurting itself on its collar.

However, vets and animal welfare organizations continue to primarily recommend breakaway collars, as they present the least risk of a cat injuring itself on a collar.

== See also ==
- Dog collar
- Collar (animal)
