= Mooro =

Noongar Aboriginal clan in Western Australia

The Mooro are a Nyungar Aboriginal clan, a subgroup of the Whadjuk. Their territory stretches from the Swan River in Perth north to the Moore River beyond the northern limits of metropolitan Perth and east to Ellen Brook. Evidence of Aboriginal occupation of the Swan Coastal Plain extends back more than 40,000 years.

== History ==
Prior to colonisation and during first contact, the Mooro clan traversed the lakes and wetlands running parallel to the coast, including Yanchep, Neerabup Lake, Lake Joondalup, and as far south as Lake Monger. The region was a key food and water source, where wild fowl, fish, frogs, freshwater tortoises and a range of marsupials could be captured. The coastal region to the west yielded chert and limestone suitable for making stone tools. They moved with the seasons, seeking higher ground further east in winter, then returning in late spring and setting fire to the bushland to capture game such as wallabies, kangaroos and possums; their main camp was at Mount Eliza in what is now Kings Park.

At the time of European settlement, Yellagonga, the uncle of Yagan, was the leader of the Mooro group. Initially, relations were friendly, and a number of explorers such as Robert Menli Lyon and George Grey reported on favourable encounters with groups of Mooro. John Butler, a Swan River settler who in March 1834 went north to search for cattle pasture, reported that "the natives were those Wanneroo men who frequent Perth in company with the Yellagonga tribe – they were friendly towards us but we were cautious in letting them see our bread". However, competing demands for resources and cultural misunderstandings resulted in conflict.

By the late 1830s, having been largely removed or restricted from the lands on which they had been self-sufficient, and decimated by European diseases and conflict with settlers, the traditional lifestyle had gone into demise. A census by Francis Armstrong counted 28 Mooro. Within less than twenty years, the community had basically disintegrated, with the remaining people exiled to permanent waterholes on the outskirts of Perth.
