= Yellagonga Regional Park =

Regional park in Perth, Western Australia

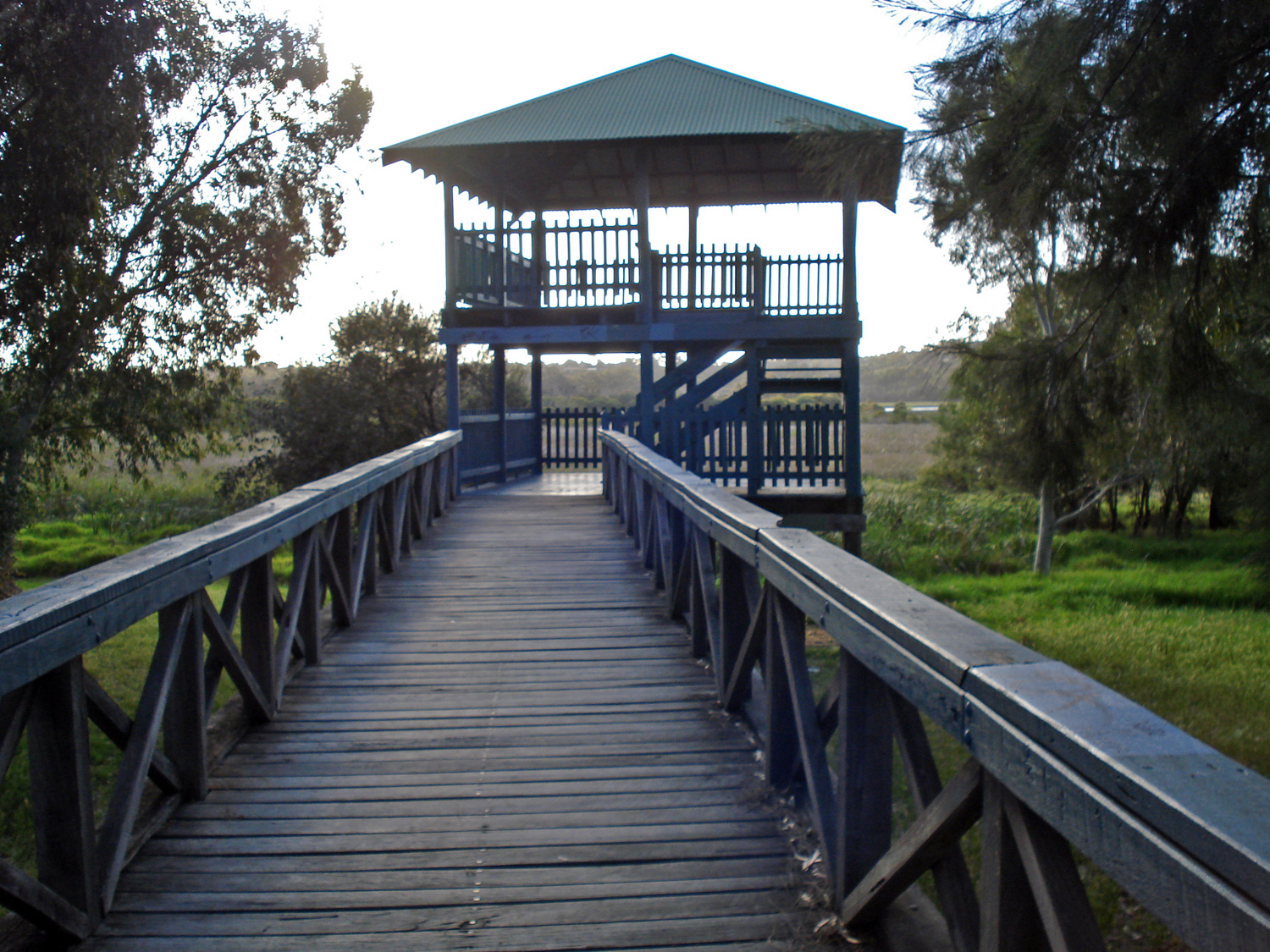
- Lookout tower and boardwalk, Lake Joondalup, Yellagonga Regional Park
- Interactive map of Yellagonga Regional Park
- Type: Regional park
- Location: City of Joondalup
- Coordinates: 31.745°S 115.785°E
- Area: 1,400 ha (3,500 acres)
- Administrator: Department of Biodiversity, Conservation and Attractions
- Website: parks.dpaw.wa.gov.au/park/yellagonga

Yellagonga Regional Park is in Perth, Western Australia, in the City of Wanneroo and the City of Joondalup. The park was established in 1989 by the Western Australian government and protects 1,400 hectares (3,500 acres) of land, including 550 hectares (1,400 acres) of Wanneroo wetlands – including Lake Joondalup, Beenup Swamp, Walluburnup Swamp and Lake Goollelal.

The park contains heritage buildings, including Perry's Cottage, Cockman House and Luisini Winery, and recreation areas such as Neil Hawkins Park. It is named after Yellagonga, leader of the Mooro people.

== History ==
Under the Perth Metropolitan Region Scheme, much of the park's area was reserved in 1975. The park was named Yellagonga Regional Park in 1990, in honour of the regional Whadjuk Noongar leader during European settlement, Yellagonga. For local Aboriginal people the area forms part of their Dreaming. The site also has historical significance related to the development of the City of Wanneroo.

== Geography and species ==
Yellagonga Regional Park consists of high elevation sloping dunes, separated by interdunal swales that contain the park's lakes and wetlands. The western side of the park is quite steep, with a central plateau of up to 50 metres (160 ft) elevation. The eastern and southern parts of the park have a gentler slope towards Lake Goollelal and Walluburnup Swamp.

In 1996, the Department of Environmental Protection identified 217 species of flora, including 103 introduced species. The park has no recorded species of Declared Rare Flora but does have significant species, such as Jacksonia sericea, Conostylis bracteata, Hibbertia cuneiformis, Amyema miquelii, Lechenaultia linarioides and Ricinocarpus glaucus.

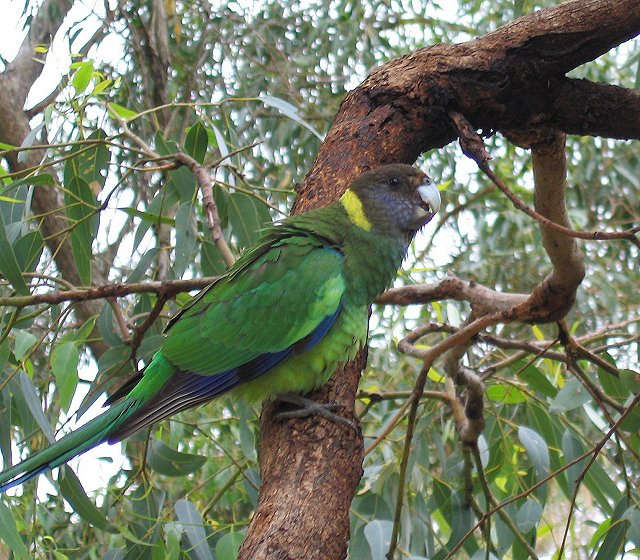
Ringneck parrot at Neil Hawkins Park

Over 120 bird species have been recorded in the park, with 18 species using the park for breeding grounds. A number of the recorded species are migratory birds recognised under international agreements. Three species of birds found in the park (Carnaby's cockatoo, Australasian bittern and peregrine falcon) are protected under the Wildlife Conservation Act 1950.

The impact of humans on Yellagonga National Park is extensive in areas. Many areas were previously used for farming and these are still being rehabilitated. The grassed parkland areas have led to the invasion of natural areas by aggressive introduced grass species, and weeds are also an issue. Development of roads, utilities (such as power lines and drainage outlets) and service corridors has degraded the natural landscape. Erosion is also a problem in areas, caused by tracks and pathways created by pedestrians in unsuitable locations such as slopes.

== Historical significance ==
The park contains three locations listed on the Western Australian Heritage Register: Perry's Paddock, Cockman House and Luisini Winery. Two native title claims have also been made on areas of the park by Aboriginal Australians.

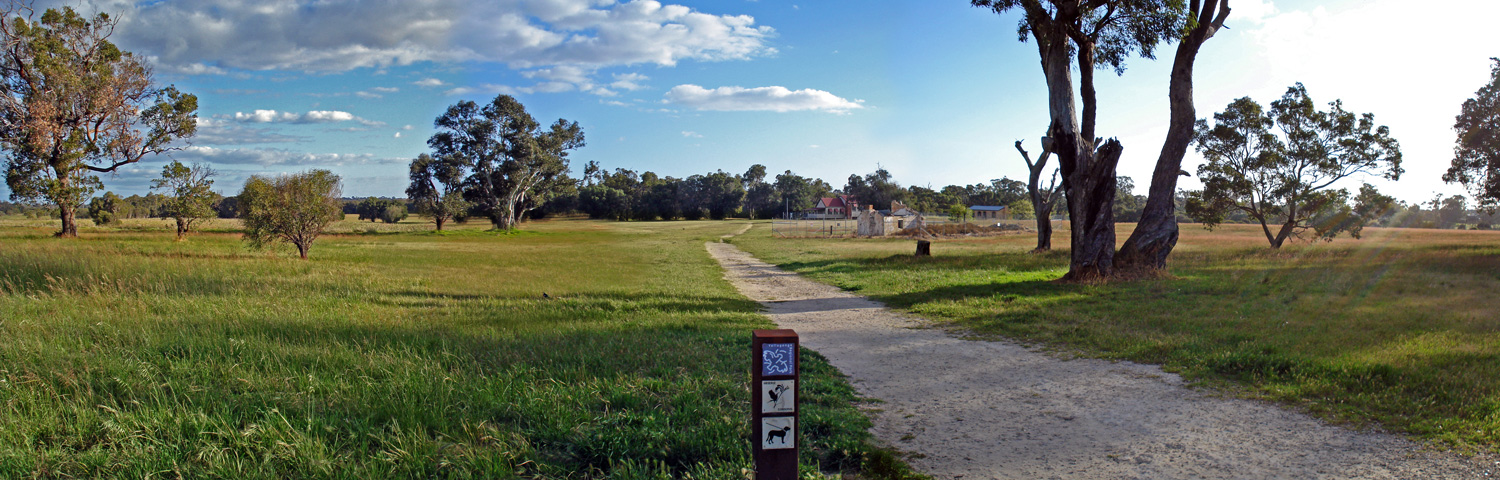
Panorama of Perry's Paddock

Perry's Paddock, at Lot 1 Ocean Reef Road, is a registered heritage site. Land tenure is held by the Western Australian Planning Commission and it is part of the City of Wanneroo. Perry's Paddock is notable because it is the location of Wanneroo's first land grant, surveyed in 1838, and Picnic Race Days were held at the site in the 1920s. Perry's Cottage was built around 1850 and is an example of a building based on an English design adapted to local conditions. The cottage was restored in 2012.

The paddock used to contain the original Wanneroo Primary School building. This was moved to the site by the City of Wanneroo in 1992 as part of a planned historical village that did not go ahead. In 2007 the City of Wanneroo approved moving the school building to Neville Park at a cost of approximately $250,000, after concerns about bushfires at Yellagonga Regional Park. The move was completed on 10 March 2009.

Cockman House is a house built for settler James Cockman around 1870, and it is the oldest residence in Wanneroo. Luisini Winery, located on Lakeway Drive in Kingsley, was built in 1929. There are two heritage trails within Yellagonga Regional Park, the Lake Joondalup Trail and the Yaberoo-Budjara Heritage Trail. The Lake Joondalup Trail explores the development of Wanneroo, and the Yaberoo-Budjara Trail between Lake Joondalup and Yanchep National Park explores areas of significance to Aboriginal Australians and European settlement.

== Development ==
There have been ongoing proposals for developments in Yellagonga Regional Park. The City of Joondalup and the City of Wanneroo commissioned a feasibility study for an environment centre at the park in 2007. The study recommended the environment centre's placement at Lot 1 Lakeside Drive, Joondalup or Scenic Drive, Wanneroo. The City of Joondalup called for additional consultation and studies in March 2008, particularly on the financing the construction and running of the environment centre and its education programs.

The National Trust has proposed redeveloping Luisini Winery to create a museum of early winemaking and wine appreciation. Their proposal, which also includes a restaurant, environment centre and car park, was approved by the City of Joondalup on 27 March 2007.

The park was allocated funds by the Department of Environment and Conservation in September 2008 to build roads, a shelter, and bicycle and pedestrian paths.
