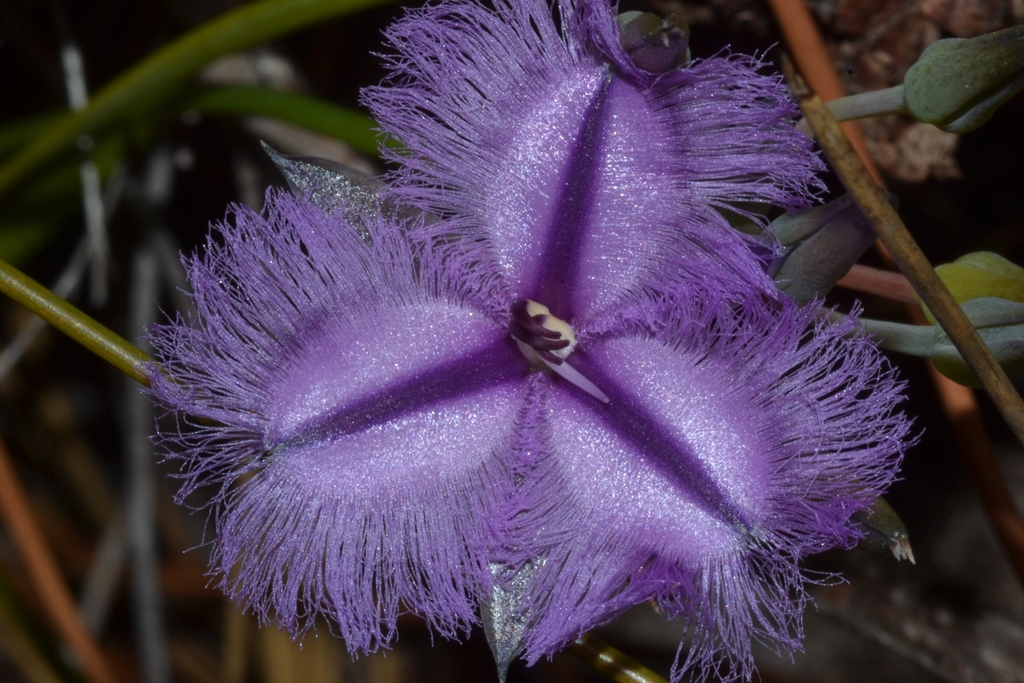
- Near Lake Gnangara

Scientific classification
- Kingdom: Plantae
- Clade: Embryophytes
- Clade: Tracheophytes
- Clade: Spermatophytes
- Clade: Angiosperms
- Clade: Monocots
- Order: Asparagales
- Family: Asparagaceae
- Subfamily: Lomandroideae
- Genus: Thysanotus
- Species: T. triandrus

Binomial name
- Thysanotus triandrus (Labill.) R.Br.

Synonyms
- List: Chlamysporum hispidulum Steud. nom. inval., pro syn.; Chlamysporum triandrum Steud. nom. inval., pro syn.; Chlamysporum triandrum (Labill.) Britten; Ornithogalum triandrum Labill.; Thysanotus bentianus Ewart & Jean White; Thysanotus hispidulus R.Br.; Thysanotus nanus Endl.; Thysanotus triandrus var. bentianus (Ewart & Jean White) Domin; Thysanotus triandrus var. hispidulus (R.Br.) Domin; Thysanotus triandrus var. praecox Domin; Thysanotus triandrus var. pritzelianus Domin; Thysanotus triandrus (Labill.) R.Br. var. triandrus; Thysanotus triandrus var. tunicatus Domin; Thysanotus triandrus var. typicus Domin nom. inval.

= Thysanotus triandrus =

Species of plant

Thysanotus triandrus, commonly known as three-stamened fringe lily is a species of flowering plant in the Asparagaceae family, and is endemic to the south-west of Western Australia. It is a tufted perennial herb with a small rootstock, fibrous roots, narrowly lance-shaped to more or less linear, perennial leaves and an umbels of four to fifty purple flowers with lance-shaped sepals, elliptic fringed petals and three stamens with equal anthers.

== Description ==
Thysanotus triandrus is a tufted perennial herb with a small rootstock and fibrous roots. It has about 5 to 42 narrowly lance-shaped to more or less linear and flat or channelled leaves that are more or less terete on the upper surface and ridged below, 50–430 mm (2.0–16.9 in) long and 1.5–3 mm (0.059–0.118 in) wide. The flowers are borne in an umbel with four to fifty flowers, each on a pedicel 5–35 mm (0.20–1.38 in) long. The perianth segments are 9–15 mm (0.35–0.59 in) long, the sepals lance-shaped, about 3 mm (0.12 in) wide, and the petals elliptic, 6–7 mm (0.24–0.28 in) wide, with a fringe about 3 mm (0.12 in) long. There are three stamens, the anthers about 5 mm (0.20 in) long, slightly curved and twisted, the style curved, about 6 mm (0.24 in) long. Flowering occurs from September to December, and the seeds are cylindrical about 2 mm (0.079 in) long and 1 mm (0.039 in) in diameter with a stalked, yellow aril.

== Taxonomy ==
This species was first formally described in 1810 by Jacques Labillardière who gave it the name Ornithogalum triandrum in his Novae Hollandiae Plantarum Specimen. In the same year, Robert Brown transferred the species to Thysanotus as T. triandrus. The specific epithet (triandrus) means 'three-stamens'.

== Distribution and habitat ==
Thysanotus triandrus grows in low Banksia forest on inland sandplain vegetation in deep white sand, sometimes with Eucalyptus staeri in dark, humus-rich sand. It occurs from Cockleshell Gully to Esperance and Israelite Bay, in the Avon Wheatbelt, Esperance Plains, Geraldton Sandplains, Jarrah Forest, Mallee, Swan Coastal Plain and Warren bioregions of south-western Western Australia.

== Conservation status ==
Thysanotus teretifolius is listed as "not threatened" by the Western Australian Government Department of Biodiversity, Conservation and Attractions.
