= Joondalup =

- Suburb
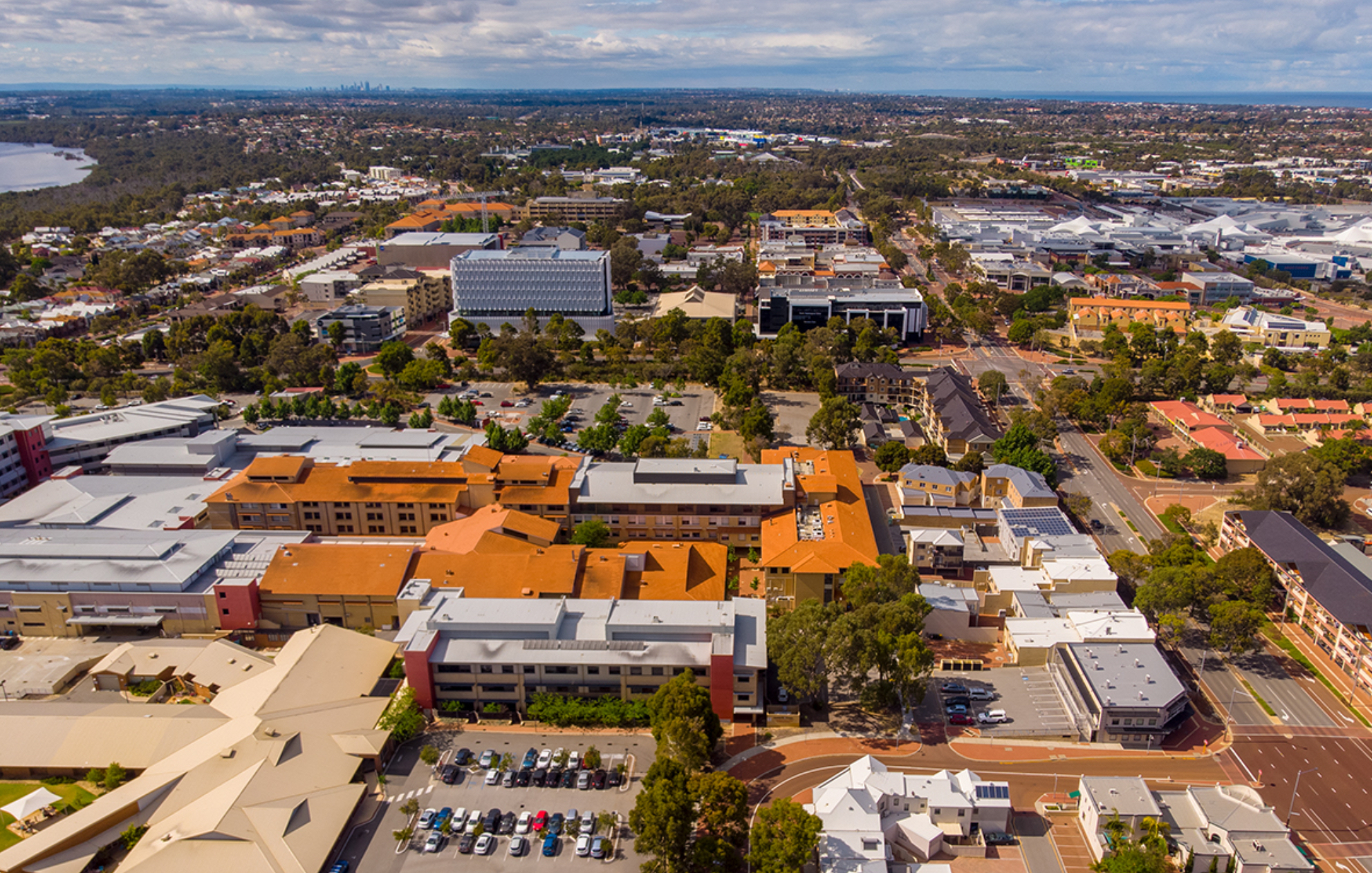
- Aerial view of Joondalup
- Interactive map of Joondalup
- Coordinates: 31.745°S 115.766°E
- Country: Australia
- State: Western Australia
- City: Perth
- LGA: City of Joondalup
- Location: 26 km (16 mi) from Perth
- Established: 1980s

Government
  - State electorate: Joondalup
  - Federal division: Moore

Area
  - Total: 11.8 km^{2} (4.6 sq mi)

Population
  - Total: 9,193 (SAL 2021)
- Postcode: 6027
Suburbs around Joondalup
Kinross	Neerabup	Carramar
Currambine; Connolly	Joondalup	Lake Joondalup
Heathridge	Edgewater	Edgewater

Joondalup (/ˈdʒuːndəlʌp/) is a suburb of Perth, Western Australia, approximately 26 kilometres (16 mi) north of Perth's central business district. It contains the central business district of the regional City of Joondalup and acts as the primary urban centre of Perth's outer northern suburbs.

== History ==
During the latter part of the 1960s, the Metropolitan Regional Planning Authority developed the Corridor Plan for Perth which was published and adopted in 1970. The plan called for the creation of five "sub-regional" retail centres (Fremantle, Joondalup, Midland, Armadale and Rockingham) which would form the commercial and economic focus of each "node", and take the retail burden away from the CBD. The Corridor Plan was not endorsed by Parliament until 1973.

In order to grow both the five "sub-regional" retail centres and these off-corridor regional shopping centres, a Retail Shopping Policy was developed by MRPA in 1976, and a Perth Metropolitan Region Retail Structure Plan was put in place to regulate the industry. This Plan was amended as new centres were required. A review of the Corridor Plan in 1987 found that the sub-regional centres had failed to adequately compete against the regional shopping centres in the middle-distance suburbs.

Most of the land in the area remained largely undeveloped until the 1960s, and Joondalup started to become the "city of the north" towards the late 1980s to the early 1990s when houses and businesses were established in the area. Joondalup is the key regional hub for the north of Perth, a status confirmed by the Western Australian State Government's new Directions 2031 strategy which names Joondalup town centre as one of two Primary Centres for the Perth metropolitan area.

The city is named after Lake Joondalup. The name Joondalup is a Noongar word, first recorded in 1837 and possibly meaning either "place of whiteness or glistening", or "place of a creature that can only move backwards".

== Geography ==
Joondalup is bounded by Burns Beach Road to the north, Mitchell Freeway to the west, Eddystone and Lakeside Drive to the south and Lake Joondalup to the east. Grand Boulevard and Joondalup Drive run through the centre of the suburb. Most of Joondalup consists of commercial and residential zones, although a suburban area exists between Moore Drive and Burns Beach Road near Currambine railway station, and some small residential estates have been built along Lakeside Drive. The Yellagonga Regional Park and a small bushland corridor near the TAFE and university campuses are located in the east and south.

== Demographics ==
Historical population
Year	Pop.	±%
2001	6,927	—
2006	8,420	+21.6%
2011	9,197	+9.2%
2016	9,090	−1.2%

In the 2016 census, there were 9,090 people in Joondalup. 46.4% of people were born in Australia. The next most common countries of birth were England 15.3%, New Zealand 3.8%, South Africa 3.3%, Scotland 2.1% and India 2.0%. 73.5% of people spoke only English at home. Other languages spoken at home included Mandarin 3.0%, Arabic 1.9% and Afrikaans 1.3%. The most common responses for religion were No Religion 34.5%, Catholic 17.6% and Anglican 13.4%. The median age of the suburb was 34.

== Governance and law ==
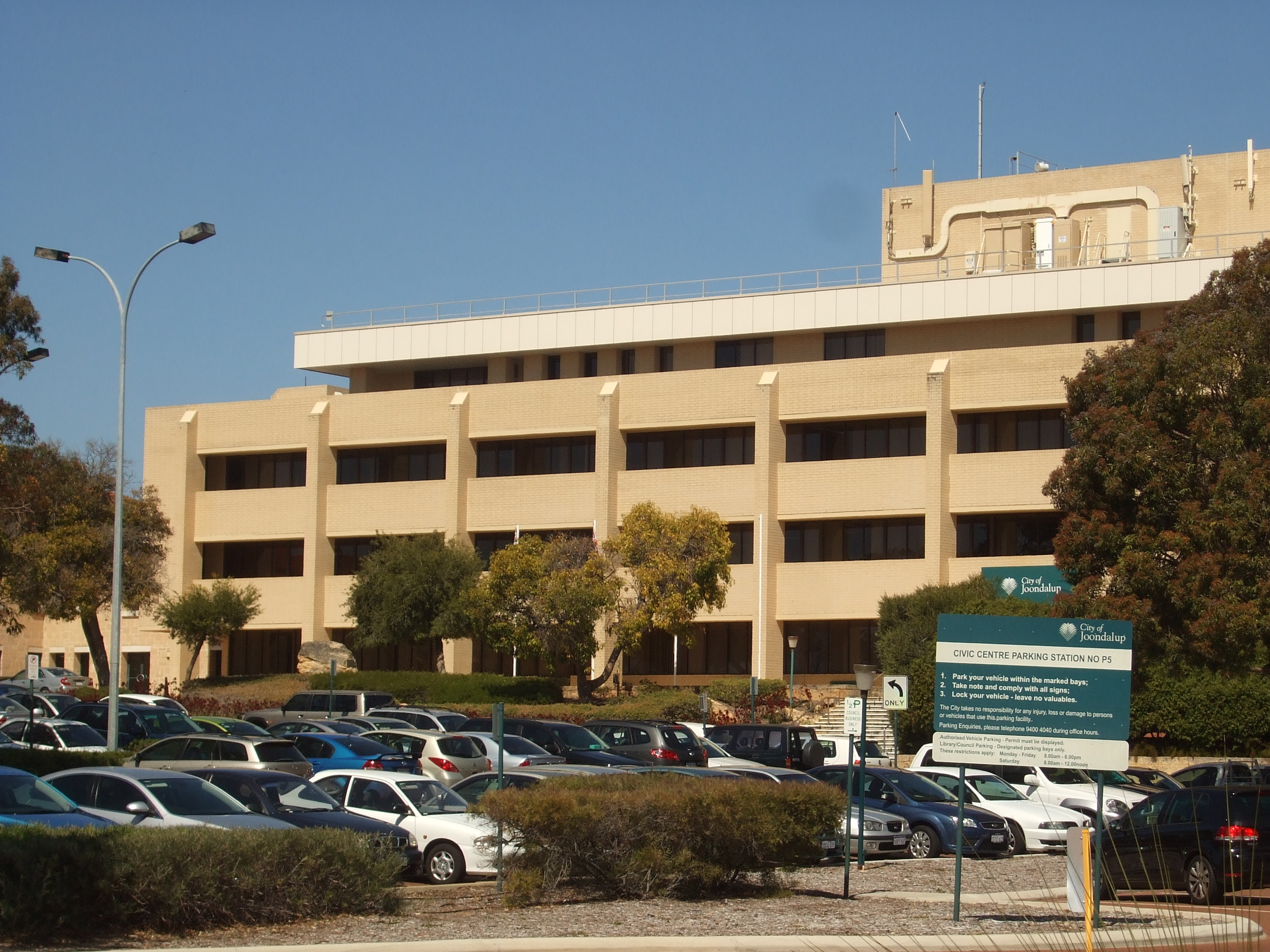
Joondalup Civic Chambers

Joondalup falls under the local government of the City of Joondalup and is represented by two councillors from the North Ward. The current councillors are Kerry Hollywood and Tom McLean. The council chambers for the City of Joondalup are located in Joondalup's central business district. The complex includes Joondalup Library, which serves as the central library and local history centre for both the City of Joondalup and the City of Wanneroo local authorities. The Joondalup offices of the Australian Electoral Commission are located in the CBD. At state parliament level, Joondalup is represented in the Western Australian Legislative Assembly by a member from Joondalup electoral district. The current member is Emily Hamilton. In the Australian federal parliament, the suburb is part of the Division of Moore and is currently represented by Tom French.

The Western Australia Police Force has a police station based in Joondalup. The WA Magistrates Court has a metropolitan court based in Joondalup that deals with both criminal offences and civil claims for debt or damages and non-offences.

== Culture ==
=== Retail ===
Joondalup's central business district, centred on Grand Boulevard, is largely a shopping and retail area lined with townhouses and apartments. Lakeside Joondalup is located adjacent to the Joondalup railway station and backs onto Grand Boulevard.

=== Events and festivals ===
Joondalup is home to the Joondalup Festival, an annual event that takes place in the CBD featuring markets, music, fashion, street arts, fairground rides and street parades. The festival is free-of-charge and attracts people from all over the Perth metropolitan area. Kaleidoscope Festival has also been held in the city since 2016, featuring various art and light installations. The festival attracted over 50,000 people in its inaugural year.

=== Parks and beaches ===
The city has a number of parks including Central Park and Neil Hawkins Park in the Yellagonga Regional Park. The Neil Hawkins Park is home to many parrots (including the Australian ringneck), cockatoos and kangaroos. The park is located alongside Lake Joondalup and wetlands which stretches out between Burns Beach Road to the north and Ocean Reef Road to the south. These wetlands provide refuge for migratory birds. Joondalup's coastal front consists of Burns Beach in the north and Beaumaris Beach in Ocean Reef, running onto the Ocean Reef Boat Harbour in the south.

=== Sports ===
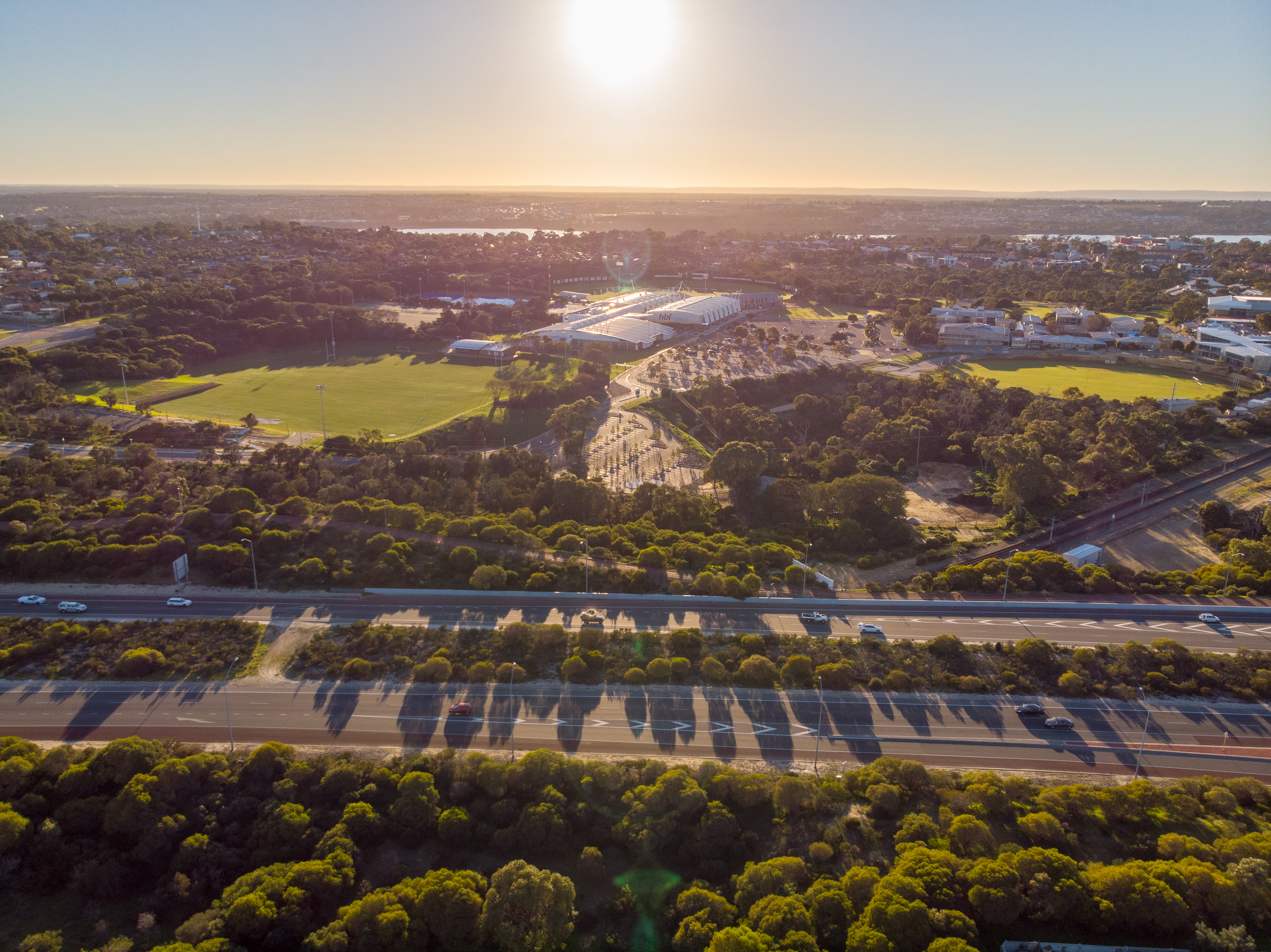
Looking east over the Mitchell freeway at Arena Joondalup, with Lake Joondalup Baptist College on the right

Joondalup is home to ECU Joondalup SC, Joondalup United FC and Sorrento FC who play in the National Premier Leagues which is Australia's second tier association football league. Sorrento FC is one of Joondalup's most successful clubs.

Arena Joondalup, located northwest of Lakeside Joondalup shopping centre, is the home venue of West Perth Football Club and Wanneroo Basketball Association. The Arena also hosts music events and festivals during the year, as well as the Home and Lifestyle Expo, an annual exhibition held in late March to early April.

Furthermore, in the early 1990s with the addition of the Western Reds to the National Rugby League, the Joondalup Giants was established playing home games from Admiral Park in WARL completion.

== Education ==
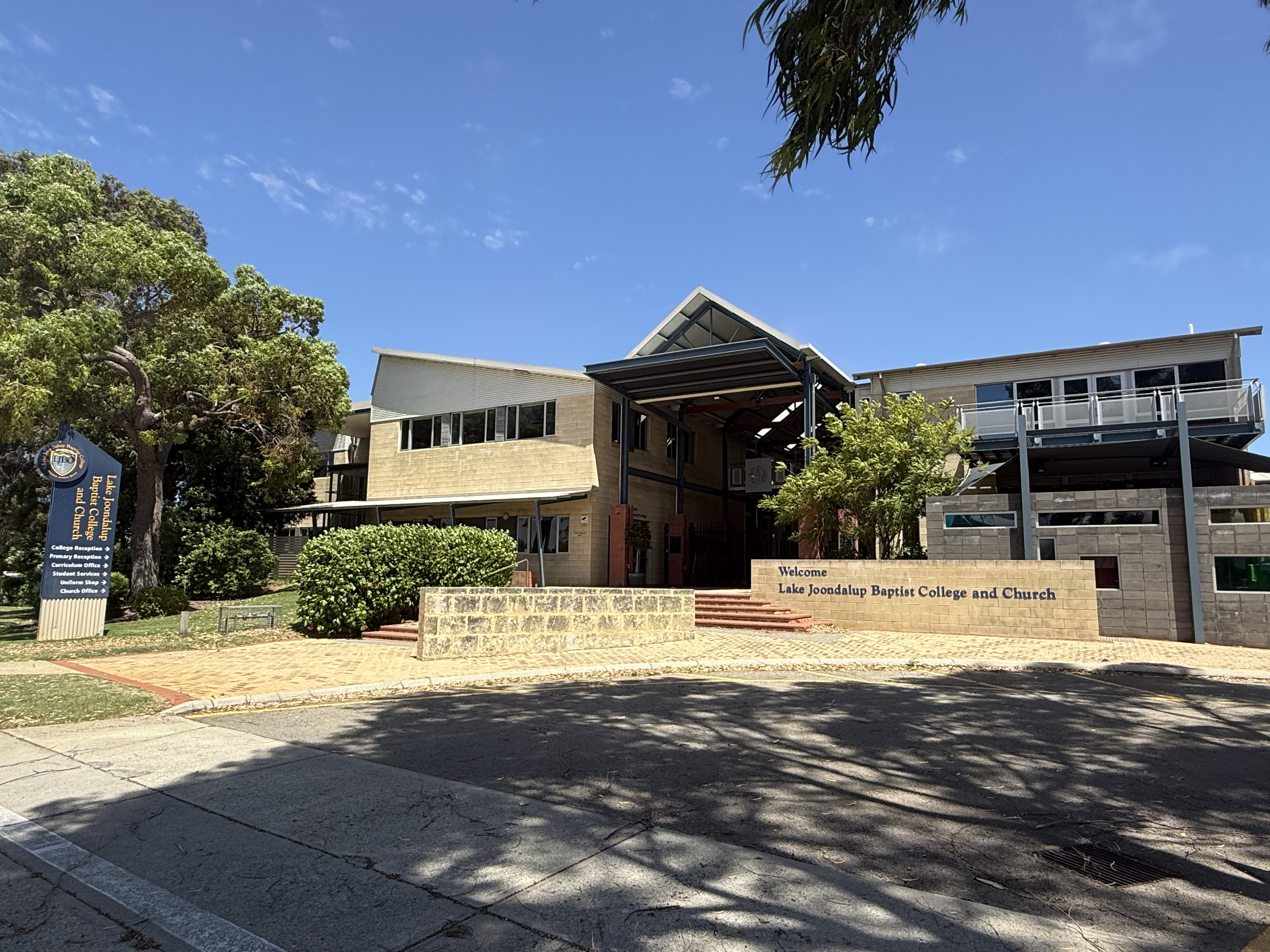
Lake Joondalup Baptist College main entrance, January 2025

The Joondalup suburb is a major location for tertiary education in the northern suburbs and is known as the Joondalup Learning Precinct. The North Metropolitan TAFE has a campus in Joondalup providing state government education to meet the demands of students wanting to enter the workforce with up-to-date, industry-specific, practical skills. It was previously called the West Coast Institute of Training. Edith Cowan University has a major campus based in the suburb. It offers graduate and post graduate degrees on the campus that also includes, libraries, guilds, commercial shops, sporting facilities, and student housing. Situated in the same Joondalup Learning Precinct as ECU and the TAFE campuses is the West Australian Police Academy. The Western Australia Police's training academy was moved from Maylands to Joondalup and was officially opened on 15 February 2002. The suburb also contains Joondalup Primary School and Lake Joondalup Baptist College.

== Infrastructure ==
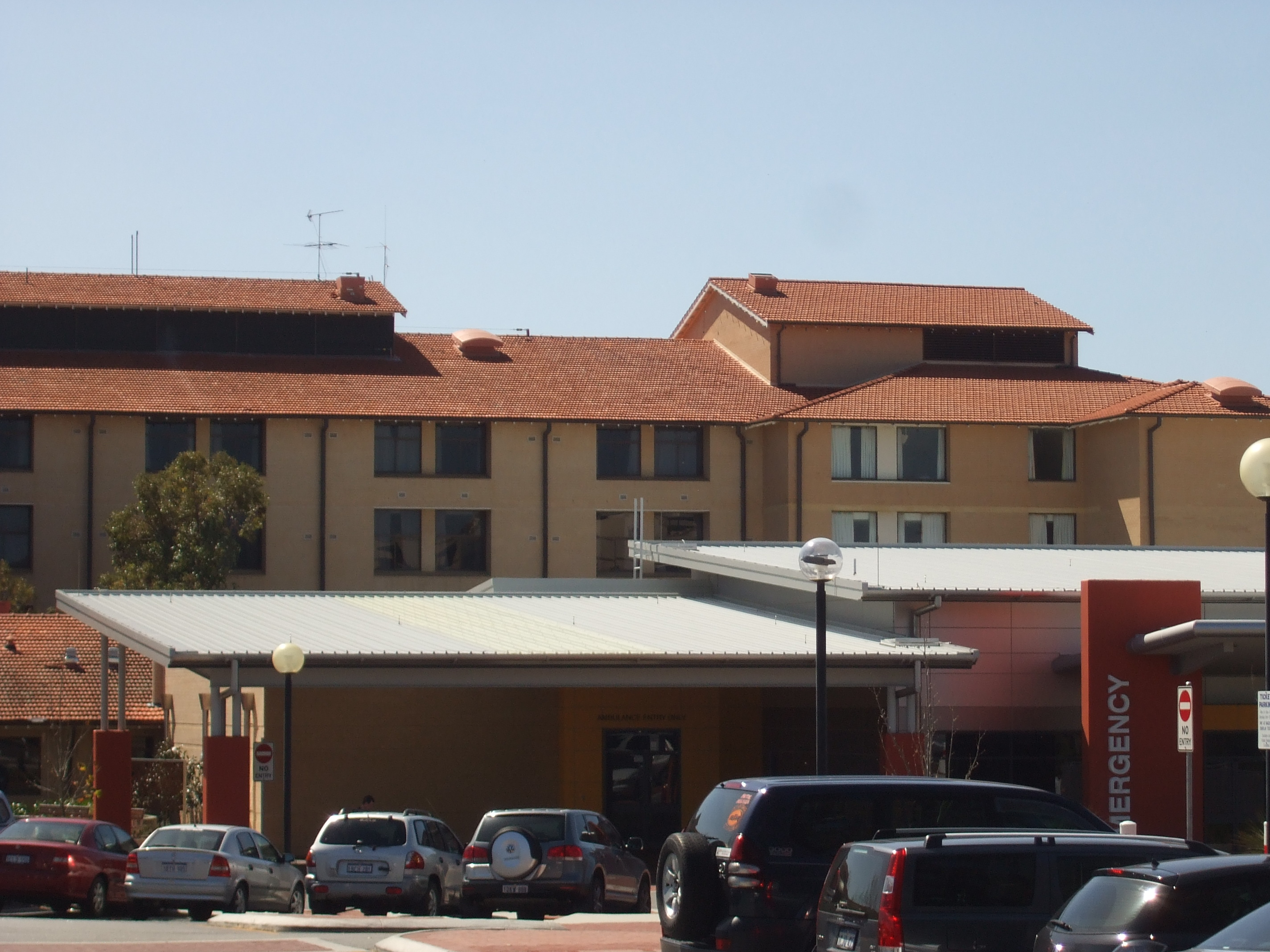
Joondalup Health Campus

=== Health ===
Joondalup contains a major public hospital, Joondalup Health Campus, which serves as the main health facility for most of Perth's northern suburbs, as far north as Two Rocks. It is often cited as one of the busiest, if not the busiest hospital in Australia due to it being the only major public hospital in the northern suburbs of Perth. Joondalup Private Hospital is also incorporated into the public Health Campus, and both facilities are owned and operated by Ramsay Health Care.

=== Utilities ===
The Joondalup region's primary potable water supply comes from the nearby Gnangara Mound. The water is treated at the Wanneroo Groundwater Treatment Plant and, as in most of Western Australia, is managed by the Water Corporation.

=== Road transport ===
The suburb of Joondalup has three interchanges to the State Route 2, Mitchell Freeway on Hodges Drive, Shenton Avenue and Burns Beach Road. The other major route through the suburb is State Route 85, Joondalup Drive which leads to the Tonkin Highway and when completed, the Brand Highway and Great Northern Highway.

==== Cycling ====
In 2026, Joondalup gained national notoriety for being one of (if not the first) suburb in Australia to seize and crush overpowered ebikes (more accurately described as unregistered electric motorbikes).

Operation Moorhead was launched by WA Police in Joondalup on January 5 2026. ABC News reported on January 14 that 36 e-rideables had been seized. Police were targeting across WA, however the operation was focused on Joondalup.

Joondalup Acting Inspector Scott Gillis stated on 2GB (a Sydney radio station) that 54 illegal e-bikes were crushed in a two-week period in their focused district area.

=== Public transport ===
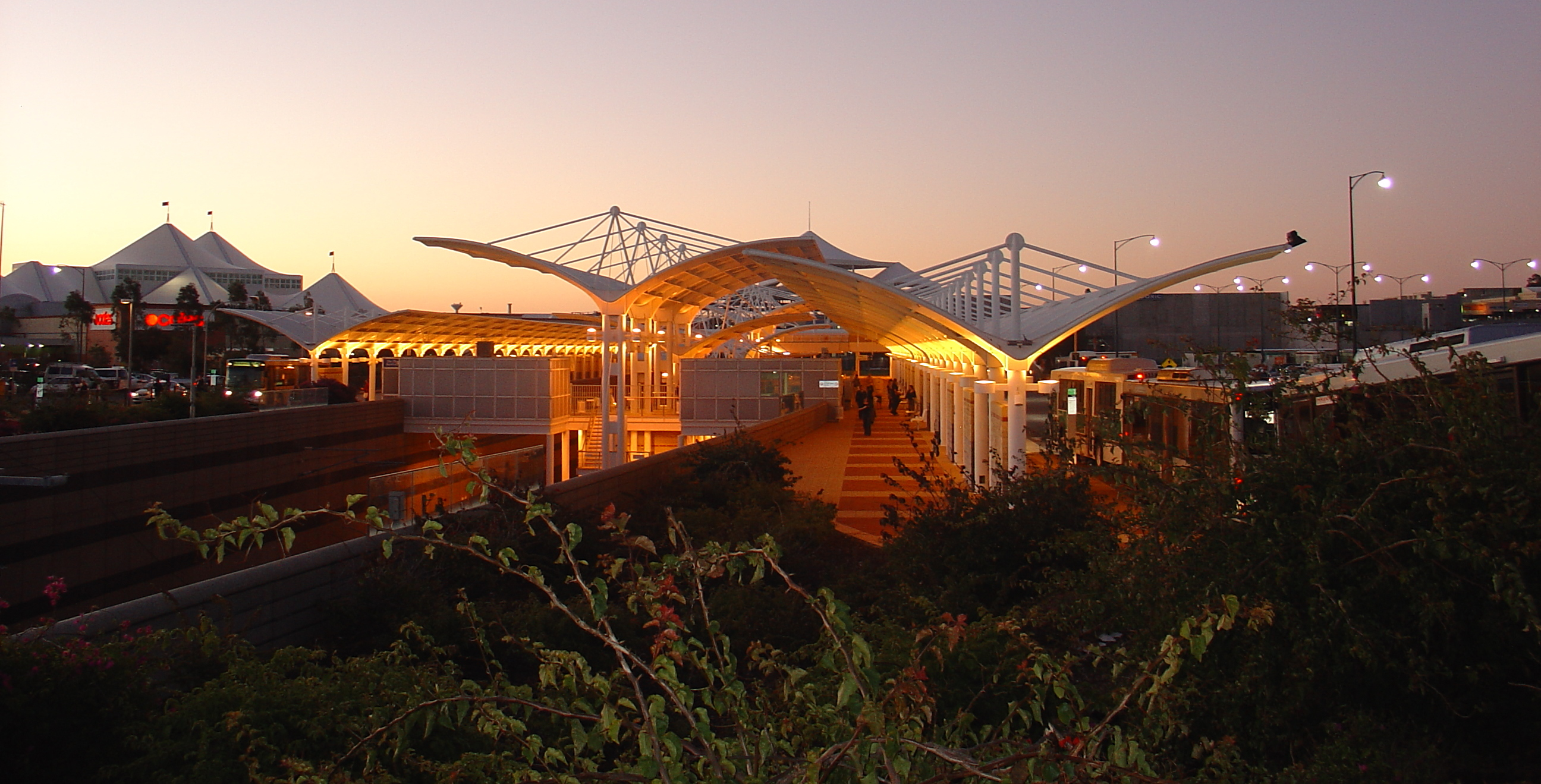
Joondalup Interchange at sunset

Joondalup railway station is located next to and connected to Lakeside Joondalup and is served by Transperth's Yanchep railway line. The railway line diverges off the alignment in the median of the Mitchell Freeway to serve the station. Trains run southbound to the Perth CBD - a 25-minute journey - and northbound to the terminus of the line at Yanchep. For a few months in early 1993, Joondalup was the terminus of the railway line, and until the extension of the line to Yanchep on 14 July 2024, the line was known as the Joondalup line.

There are two types of bus services in the suburb. A free service, the Central Area Transit (routes 10 (Red) and 11 (Blue)), travel a circular route around Joondalup's central area, including Joondalup Health Campus, Edith Cowan University, North Metropolitan TAFE and Joondalup CBD. Route 13 (Yellow CAT) also operates during the ECU school term in the evenings Monday to Thursday, serving exclusive stops on the campus.

The rest of the suburb is serviced by normal, fare-paying services departing from the Joondalup Railway Station. Routes 390, 391, 467, 468, 471, 473 and 474 operate along Grand Boulevard through the centre of Joondalup. Routes 467 and 468 travel down Joondalup Drive with a stop at Brienz Drive, routes 390 and 391 travel along Candlewood Boulevard, and routes 473 and 474 travel along Blue Mountain Drive, all serving the housing area in the north part of the suburb.
