= Neil Hawkins Park =

Park in Perth, Western Australia

Coordinates: 31.743757°S 115.778290°E

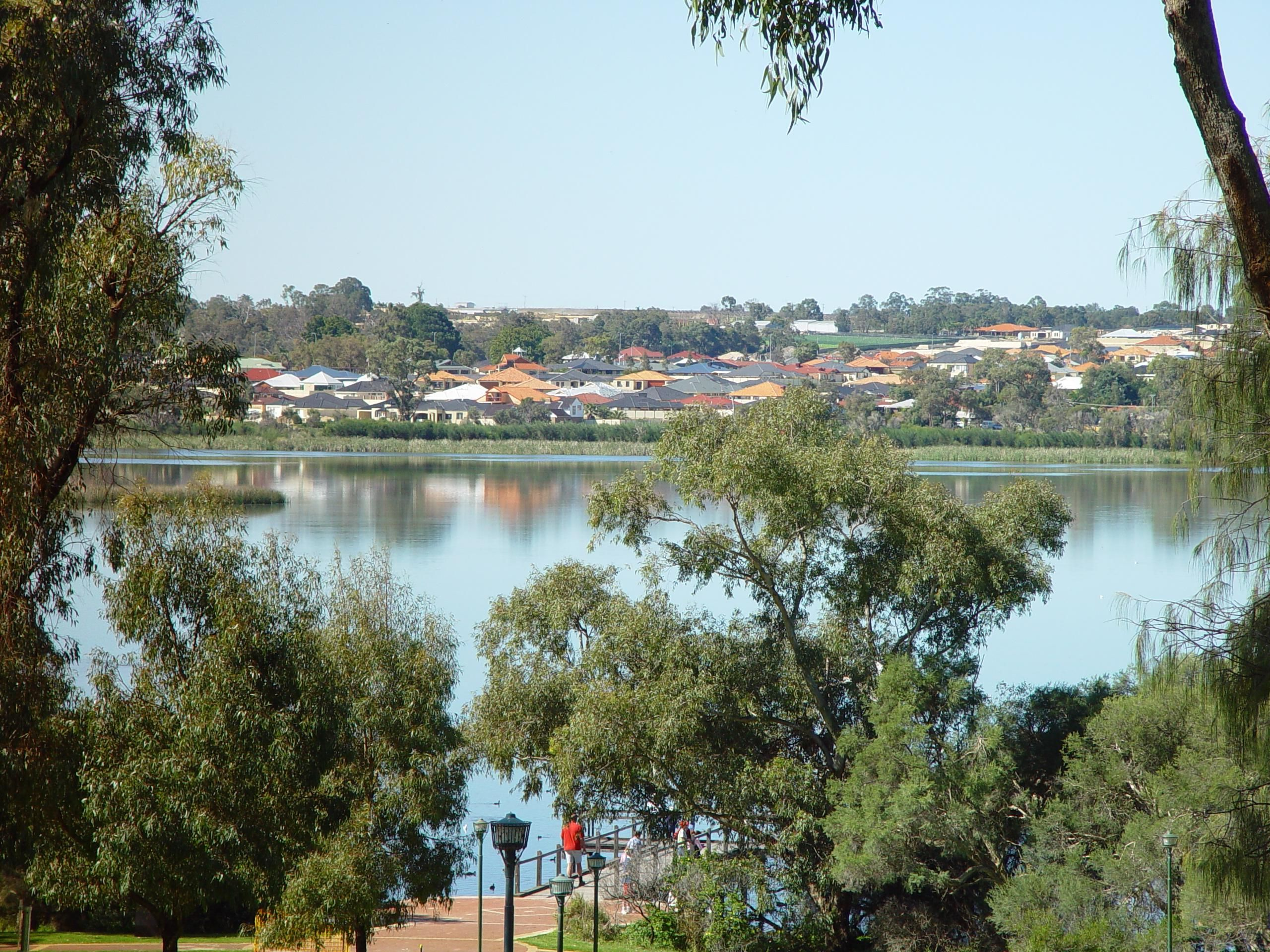
Lake Joondalup viewed from Neil Hawkins Park.

Neil Hawkins Park is a park located in Joondalup, Western Australia. It is beside Lake Joondalup, and part of the Yellagonga Regional Park.

The park was named for Neil Campbell Hawkins CBE JP, a chairman of the former Metropolitan Regional Planning Authority.

The Yaberoo Budjara Heritage Trail between Neil Hawkins Park and Loch McNess (in Yanchep National Park) follows an ancient Indigenous Australian migration route along a chain of lakes and swamps.

== Description ==
The park contains a small grassy field surrounded by a pathway, either leading to the Lake Joondalup jetty, the picnic area, or a natural area part of Yellagonga Regional Park. The park also has a playground near the main picnic area. Many variations of birds can be found in the park, such as the pigeon, the white cockatoo, the Pacific black duck, geese, the Australian wood duck, and the Australian ringneck parrots.
