= Wanneroo wetlands =

Lakes and swamps in Wanneroo district of Western Australia

The Wanneroo wetlands are a series of wetlands, swamps and lakes that occur on the Swan Coastal Plain of Perth, Western Australia. They are linked very closely to the Gnangara Mound.

They are in part, incorporated into the Yellagonga Regional Park and also referred to as Yellagonga wetlands.

== Description ==
The wetlands comprise a series of named lakes, including Lake Joondalup (or Craigie Lake), Lake Goollelal (or Welshes Lake), Jandabup Lake (or Big Dundebar Lake), Yonderup Lake, Nowergup Lake (or Narago Lake), Coogee Springs, Neerabup Lake (or Pappas Swamp), Lake Gnangara, Mariginiup Lake, Pippidinny and Boonaddy Swamps, and Loch McNess (or Yanchep Lake).

== See also ==
- List of lakes of Western Australia
