= Yellagonga =

Leader of the Whadjuk Noongar

Yellagonga (d. 1843) was a leader of the Whadjuk Noongar nation. He had two wives (Windan and Yangan), three sons (Elal, Due, and Dower), and three daughters (Daleer, Gargap, and Morap). His land was part of the Mooro district, which extends to the ocean to the west, the Melville and Swan rivers to the south, Ellenbrook to the east, and Moore River (Gyngoorda) to the north. Colonists saw Yellagonga as the owner of this area. However, land rights are described as belonging to both men and women, with Yellagonga and his family sharing rights to their land.

Yellagonga's favourite camping place (kaleep) was Goodinup (the foreshore between William and Barrack streets in what is now the Perth CBD). Goodinup was significant because it had three water sources; a spring, the swampy margins of the Swan River, and the river itself. Yellagonga and his mob were the last Noongar people in a long historical line to camp there due to colonisation. Yellagonga was also known to camp at Galup.

In 1843 the settler press reported that "the mild, amiable Yellagonga acknowledged by the natives as the possessor of vast tracts of land between Perth and Fremantle, is no more. He fell from a rock on the river's bank, and was drowned".

== Heritage ==
Yellagonga Regional Park, around Lake Joondalup, was named after him.

In 2018, Mia Yellagonga ('place of Yellagonga') was chosen as the name of the Woodside Energy Global Headquarters Campus bounded by Mounts Bay Road, Spring Street, and Mount Street (the former Emu Brewery site) in the Perth central business district.
