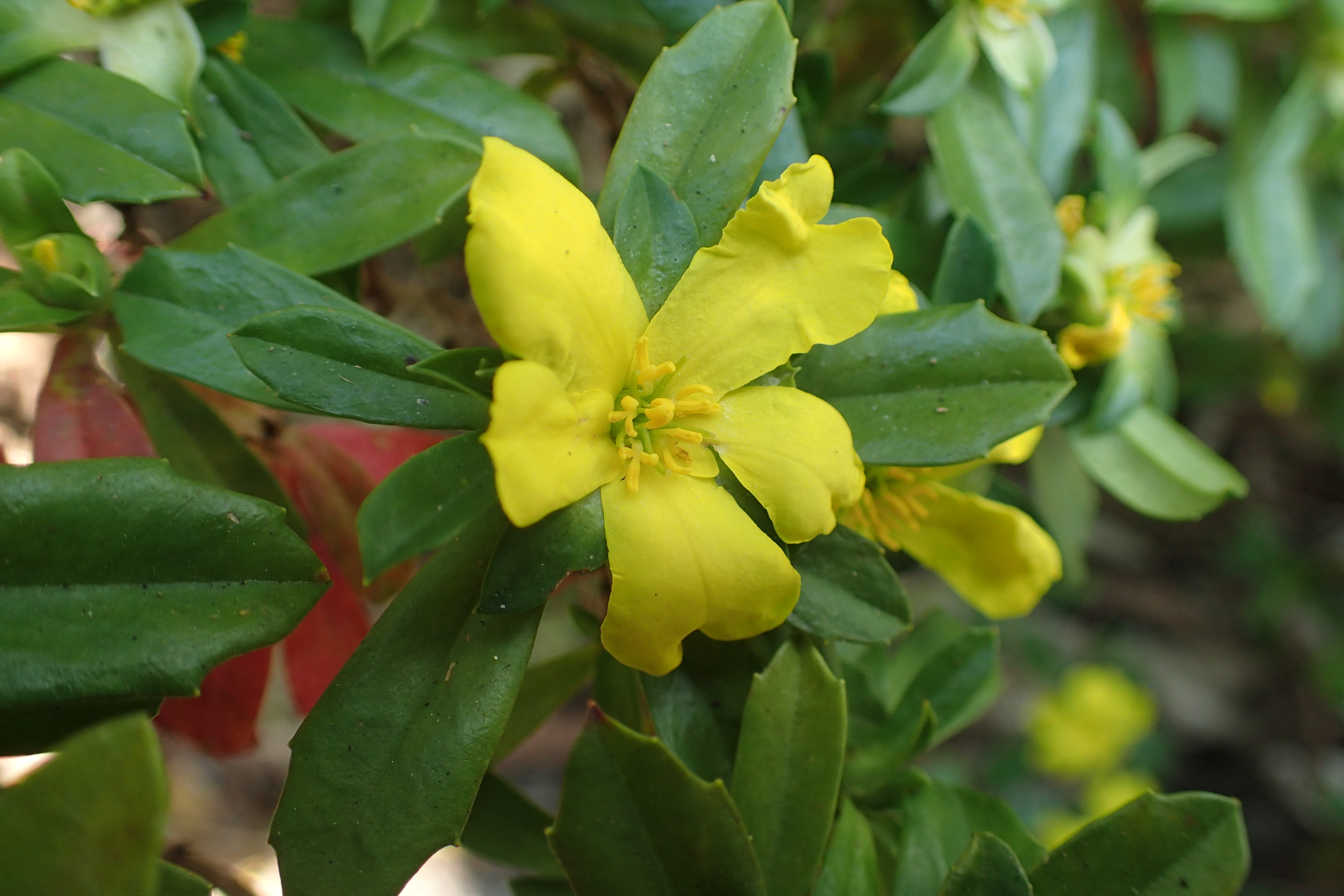

Scientific classification
- Kingdom: Plantae
- Clade: Tracheophytes
- Clade: Angiosperms
- Clade: Eudicots
- Order: Dilleniales
- Family: Dilleniaceae
- Genus: Hibbertia
- Species: H. cuneiformis

Binomial name
- Hibbertia cuneiformis (Labill.) Sm.

= Hibbertia cuneiformis =

Cut-leaf hibbertia

Species of flowering plant

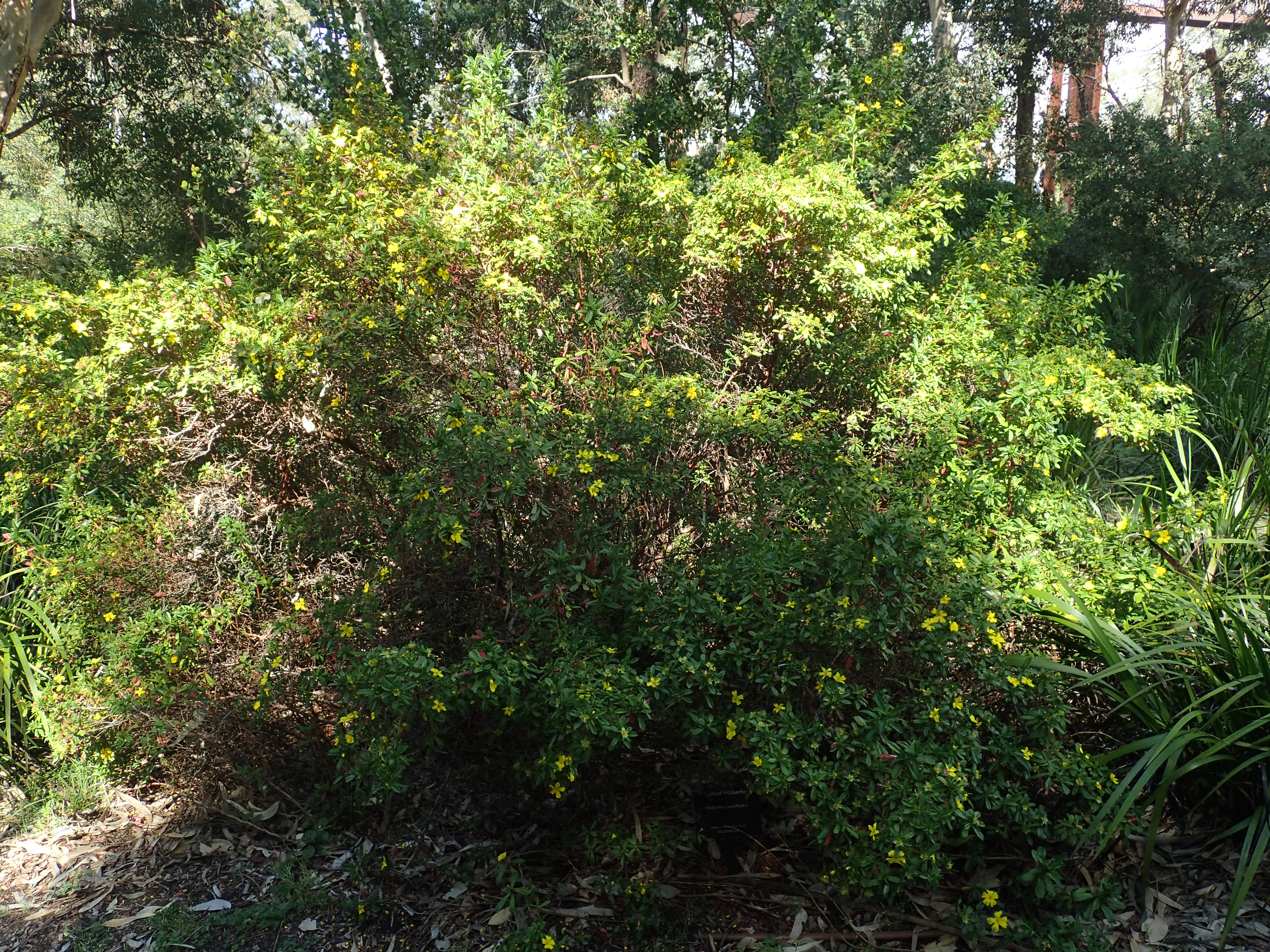
Habit in Kings Park, Perth

Hibbertia cuneiformis, commonly known as cut-leaf hibbertia, is species of erect or sprawling shrub that is endemic to the south-west of Western Australia. It grows to between 1 and 2 m (3 ft 3 in and 6 ft 7 in) tall and has yellow flowers which appear from January to March or from June to November in the species' native range.

The species was first formally described in 1806 by French naturalist Jacques Labillardière who gave it the name Candollea cuneiformis in his Novae Hollandiae Plantarum Specimen. In 1811, English botanist James Edward Smith changed the name to Hibbertia cuneiformis in Abraham Rees's Cyclopædia. The specific epithet (cuneiformis) means "wedge-shaped".

Hibbertia cuneiformis grows on sand dunes and in swampy places in near coastal-areas of the Esperance Plains, Jarrah Forest, Swan Coastal Plain and Warren biogeographic regions of south-western Western Australia. It is classified as "not threatened" by the Western Australian Government Department of Parks and Wildlife.
