= Loch McNess =

Lake in Perth, Western Australia

- Yanchep Lake
- Wagardu Lark (Nyungar)
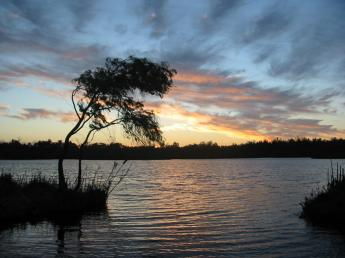
- Sunset over Loch McNess

- Location within Western Australia
- Interactive map of Loch McNess
- Location: Swan Coastal Plain, Western Australia
- Coordinates: 31°32′S 115°40′E
- Type: Freshwater
- Basin countries: Australia
- Designation: Yanchep National Park
- Max. depth: 3.4 m (11 ft)
- Islands: Several

Loch McNess (Nyungar: Wagardu Lark), also known as Yanchep Lake, is a freshwater lake located near Yanchep in the northern part of the coastal plain of Perth, Western Australia. Loch McNess is part of the Wanneroo wetlands, a chain of lakes, and is part of the Yanchep National Park. Water from the lake was used to refill the underground pools and streams in some of the nearby caves, however the project was ultimately unsuccessful and subsequently discontinued.

== Description ==
The lake is named after Charles McNess, a wealthy Western Australian philanthropist.

Galaxiidae (fish) and gilgies (freshwater crayfish) are endemic to the region. Introduced species include mosquitofish (Gambusia).

CSIRO study nutrients and plankton in the lake.

The lake is also known as Wagardu Lark by the Nyoongar people and along with the caves is of significant cultural importance.

Since European colonisation of the area and specifically with the building of Gloucester Lodge on its shores in 1933 it has traditionally been used for boating outings. There is no longer sufficient water in the lake for boating.

== See also ==
- List of lakes of Australia § Western Australia
