= Charles McNess =

Australian businessman

Sir Charles McNess
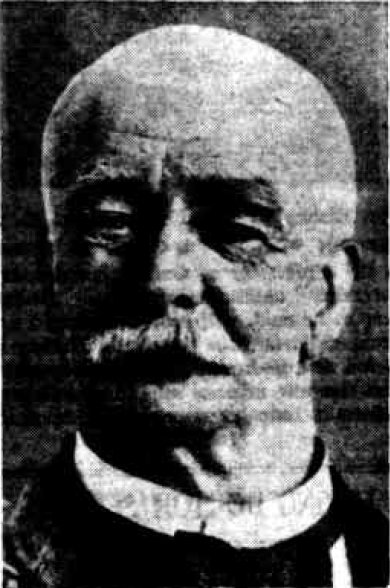
- Sir Charles McNess
- Born: 26 March 1852; Huntingdon, England
- Died: 21 June 1938 (aged 86); Mount Lawley, Western Australia
- Known for: Philanthropy

Sir Charles McNess (born 26 March 1852 in Huntingdon, England – died 21 June 1938 in Mount Lawley, Western Australia) was an ironmonger and philanthropist.

== Early years ==
In 1875 McNess married Maude Metherall in London. He migrated to Western Australia the following year.

He was married again in the late 1880s while visiting London, to Annie Elsie Poncy.

== Perth, Western Australia ==
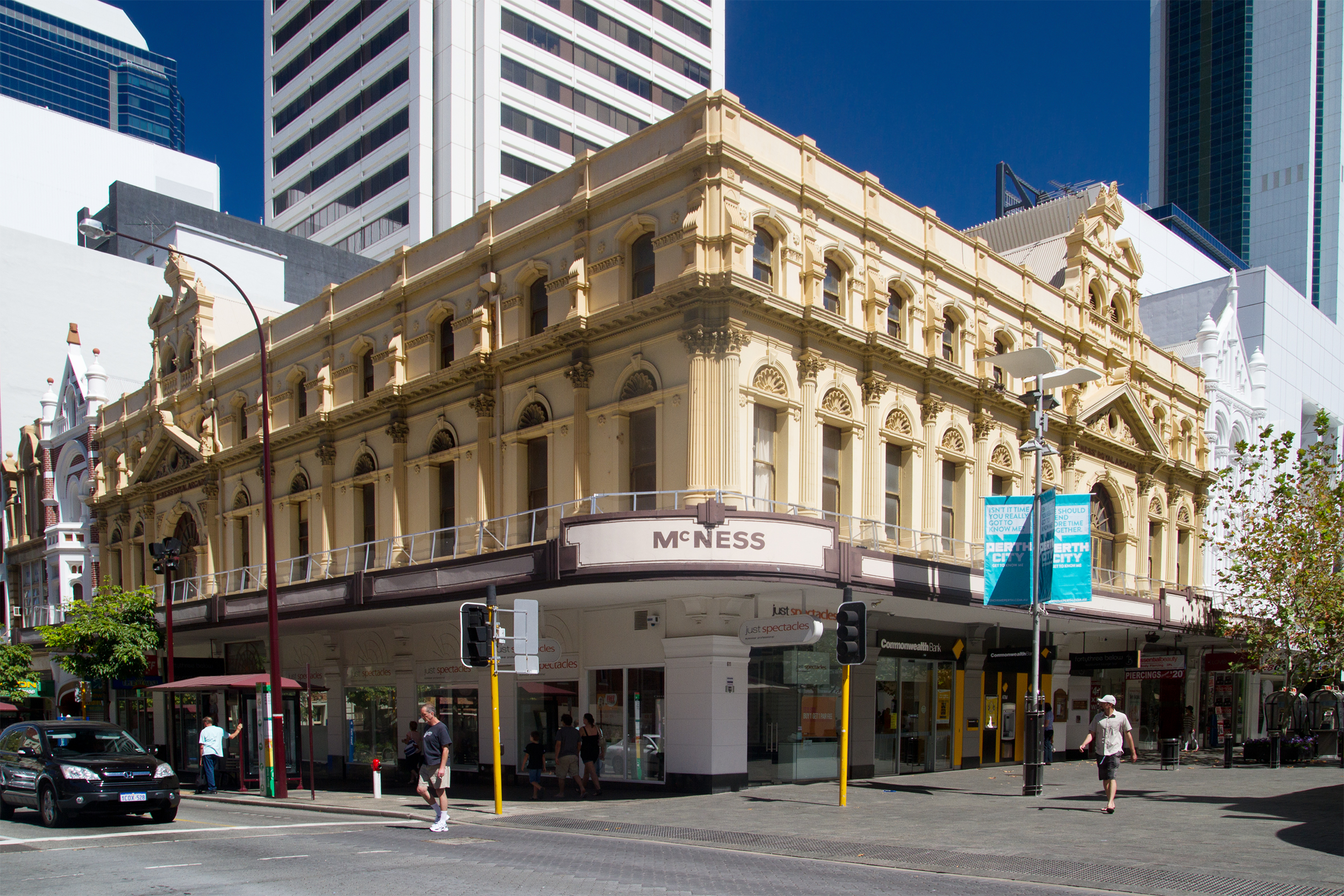
McNess Royal Arcade

As a child he worked as an apprentice tinsmith in London. He later he traded in scrap metals, and came to Australia in his mid-twenties, starting in business in Perth as an ironmonger. In Australia he became a real estate agent and invested largely in city properties including a warehouse on Wellington Street and several shops on the corner of Hay and Barrack Streets. His properties became very valuable.

He built McNess Royal Arcade on the corner of Hay and Barrack Streets in Perth in 1897—this was the first shopping arcade in the city. The property was held in the McNess family until it was sold in 1980.

McNess retired in 1915 and henceforth spent much of his time in travelling—particularly to Queensland—and distributing his fortune by giving large subscriptions to patriotic funds, hospitals, and religious bodies. The State War Memorial and Anzac House received funding through his patronage. In 1930 he founded the McNess fund for the distress caused by unemployment, and in 1932 gave £20,000 for this purpose. He was knighted by King George V while in London on 29 June 1931. In 1937 he gave about £12,000 to the state government for the construction of a road in memory of his wife, who died in February of that year. Lady McNess Memorial Drive connects Canning Dam and Brookton Highway. He also built the McNess Hall for the Presbyterian church at Perth.

McNess died on 21 June 1938 at the age of 86 at the home of his only son Herbert Fortescue McNess (born 1893) in Woodroyd Street, Mount Lawley. Herbert took over most of the McNess business activities following the death of his father.

== Legacy ==
Charles McNess was of a retiring disposition and took little part in public life. His philanthropy was unobtrusive and generally directed through his close friend, Louis Shapcott, under-secretary to the Premier of Western Australia. It has been estimated that his benefactions may have exceeded £150,000.

A monument to him is located in Florence Hummerston Reserve, Perth. Loch McNess in Yanchep was developed as part of a bequest from his estate and named in his honour in 1935.
