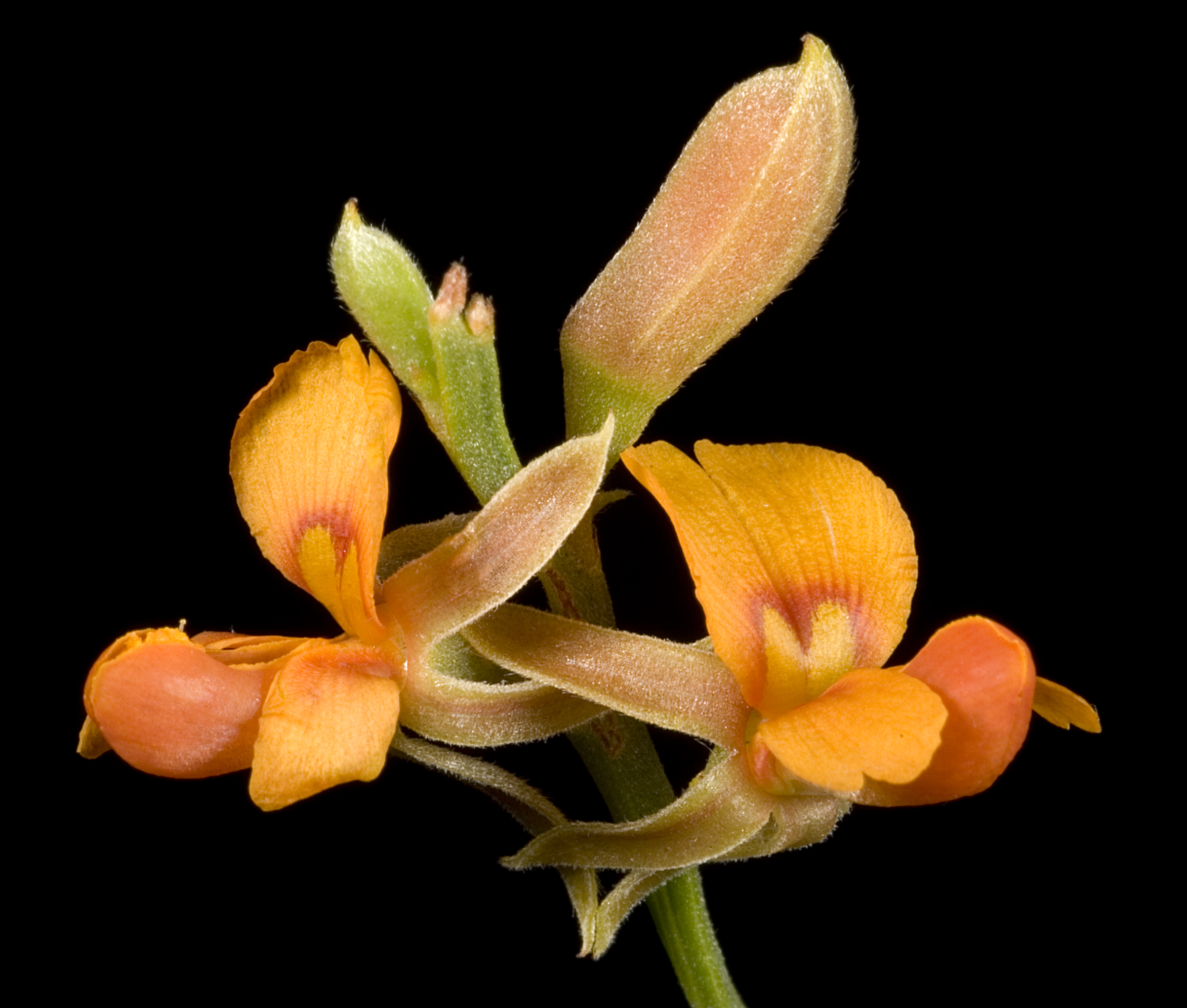

Conservation status
- Priority Four — Rare Taxa (DEC)

Scientific classification
- Kingdom: Plantae
- Clade: Embryophytes
- Clade: Tracheophytes
- Clade: Spermatophytes
- Clade: Angiosperms
- Clade: Eudicots
- Clade: Rosids
- Order: Fabales
- Family: Fabaceae
- Subfamily: Faboideae
- Genus: Jacksonia
- Species: J. sericea

Binomial name
- Jacksonia sericea Benth.

Synonyms
- Jacksonia gracilis Meisn.; Jacksonia sericea Benth. var. sericea; Jacksonia sternbergiana var. puberula Meisn.; Piptomeris sericea (Benth.) Greene

= Jacksonia sericea =

Species of legume

Jacksonia sericea, commonly known as waldjumi, is a species of flowering plant in the family Fabaceae and is endemic to the south-west of Western Australia. It is a spreading to prostrate shrub with greyish-green branches, straight, sharply-pointed side branches, leaves reduced to scales, orange flowers with red markings, and woody, densely hairy pods.

== Description ==
Jacksonia sericea is a spreading to prostrate shrub that typically grows up to 0.3–1 m (1 ft 0 in – 3 ft 3 in) high and 1–2 m (3 ft 3 in – 6 ft 7 in) wide. It has greyish-green branches, the end branches 2.2–25 mm (0.087–0.984 in) long, 0.3–0.8 mm (0.012–0.031 in) wide and mostly sharply-pointed. Its leaves are reduced to narrowly egg-shaped, pale brown scales with toothed edges, 0.9–1.8 mm (0.035–0.071 in) long and 0.4–1.1 mm (0.016–0.043 in) wide. The flowers are scattered along the branches on a pedicel 1.7–2.8 mm (0.067–0.110 in) long, with narrowly egg-shaped bracteoles 0.7–1.4 mm (0.028–0.055 in) long on the middle or near the top of the pedicels. The floral tube is 1.2–1.6 mm (0.047–0.063 in) long and the sepals are membranous, with lobes 7.5–8.8 mm (0.30–0.35 in) long and 0.9–1.7 mm (0.035–0.067 in) wide. The standard petal is orange with red markings, 4.9–7 mm (0.19–0.28 in) long, the wings are orange without markings, 5.2–7.6 mm (0.20–0.30 in) long, and the keel is orange or red, 5.5–5.9 mm (0.22–0.23 in) long. The stamens have white filaments with pink ends and 5.1–5.8 mm (0.20–0.23 in) long. Flowering occurs from October to January, and the fruit is a woody, densely hairy pod 5.5–5.7 mm (0.22–0.22 in) long and 4–5 mm (0.16–0.20 in) wide.

== Taxonomy ==
Jacksonia sericea was first formally described in 1837 by George Bentham in Stephan Endlicher's Enumeratio plantarum quas in Novae Hollandiae ora austro-occidentali ad fluvium Cygnorum et in sinu Regis Georgii collegit Carolus Liber Baro de Hügel. from specimens collected near King George Sound. The specific epithet (sericea) means 'silky'.

== Distribution and habitat ==
This species of Jacksonia grows in sandy soil over limestone, and is found in Perth suburbs between Wanneroo and Mandurah in the Swan Coastal Plain bioregion of south-western Western Australia.

== Conservation status ==
Waldjumi is listed as "Priority Four" by the Government of Western Australia Department of Biodiversity, Conservation and Attractions, meaning that it is rare or near threatened.
