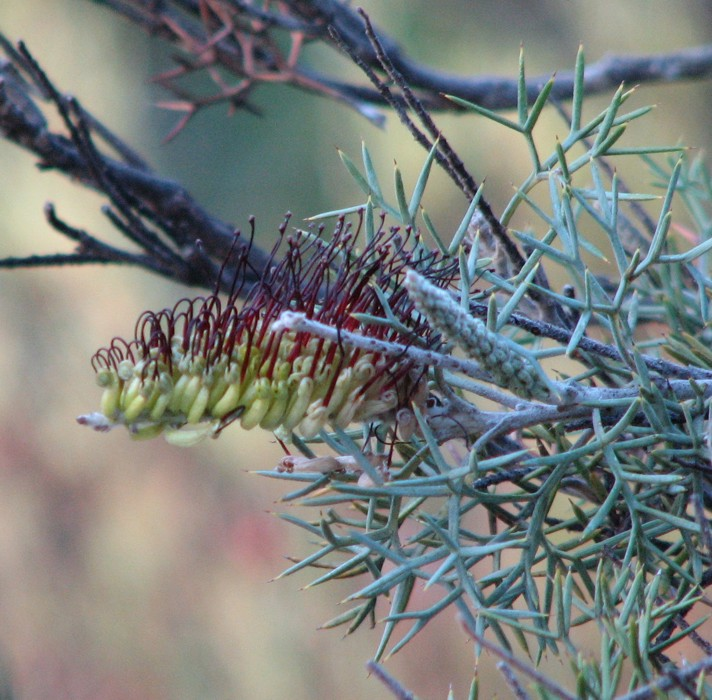
- In Maranoa Gardens

Conservation status
- Near Threatened (IUCN 3.1)

Scientific classification
- Kingdom: Plantae
- Clade: Embryophytes
- Clade: Tracheophytes
- Clade: Spermatophytes
- Clade: Angiosperms
- Clade: Eudicots
- Order: Proteales
- Family: Proteaceae
- Genus: Grevillea
- Species: G. armigera

Binomial name
- Grevillea armigera Meisn.

= Grevillea armigera =

Prickly toothbrushes

Species of plant endemic to Western Australia

Grevillea armigera, also known as prickly toothbrushes or thorny grevillea, is a species of flowering plant in the family Proteaceae and is endemic to the south-west of Western Australia. It is an erect to spreading shrub with deeply-lobed leaves, the lobes linear and sharply pointed, and grey, green or pale yellow flowers with black to maroon styles.

== Description ==
Grevillea armigera is an erect to spreading shrub that typically grows to a height of 0.5–3.5 m (1 ft 8 in – 11 ft 6 in). Its leaves are 25–50 mm (1.0–2.0 in) long and have five to eleven lobes, each usually further divided with three to five lobes, the end lobes linear, sharply-pointed, 2–25 mm (0.08–0.98 in) long and 0.5–1.5 mm (0.02–0.06 in) wide with the edges rolled under. The flowers are arranged along a rachis 50–90 mm (2.0–3.5 in) long, and are grey, green or pale yellow with a black to blackish maroon style. The pistil is 18–23 mm (0.71–0.91 in) long with a more or less sessile ovary. Flowering mainly occurs from June to February and the fruit is a follicle 11.5–14 mm (0.45–0.55 in) long.

== Taxonomy ==
Grevillea armigera was first formally described in 1856 by Swiss botanist Carl Meissner in de Candolle's Prodromus Systematis Naturalis Regni Vegetabilis from specimens collected by James Drummond in the Swan River Colony. The specific epithet (armigera) means "furnished with thorns".

== Distribution and habitat ==
Prickly toothbrushes grows in heath and shrubland from Buntine to near Dowerin in the Avon Wheatbelt and Geraldton Sandplains biogeographic regions.

== Conservation status ==
Grevillea armigera is listed as near threatened on the IUCN Red List of Threatened Species. Although it is fairly common within its range, its distribution is severely fragmented due to historical clearance for agriculture. It is currently threatened by land clearing for roads.
