= Lake Gnangara =

Lake in Perth, Western Australia

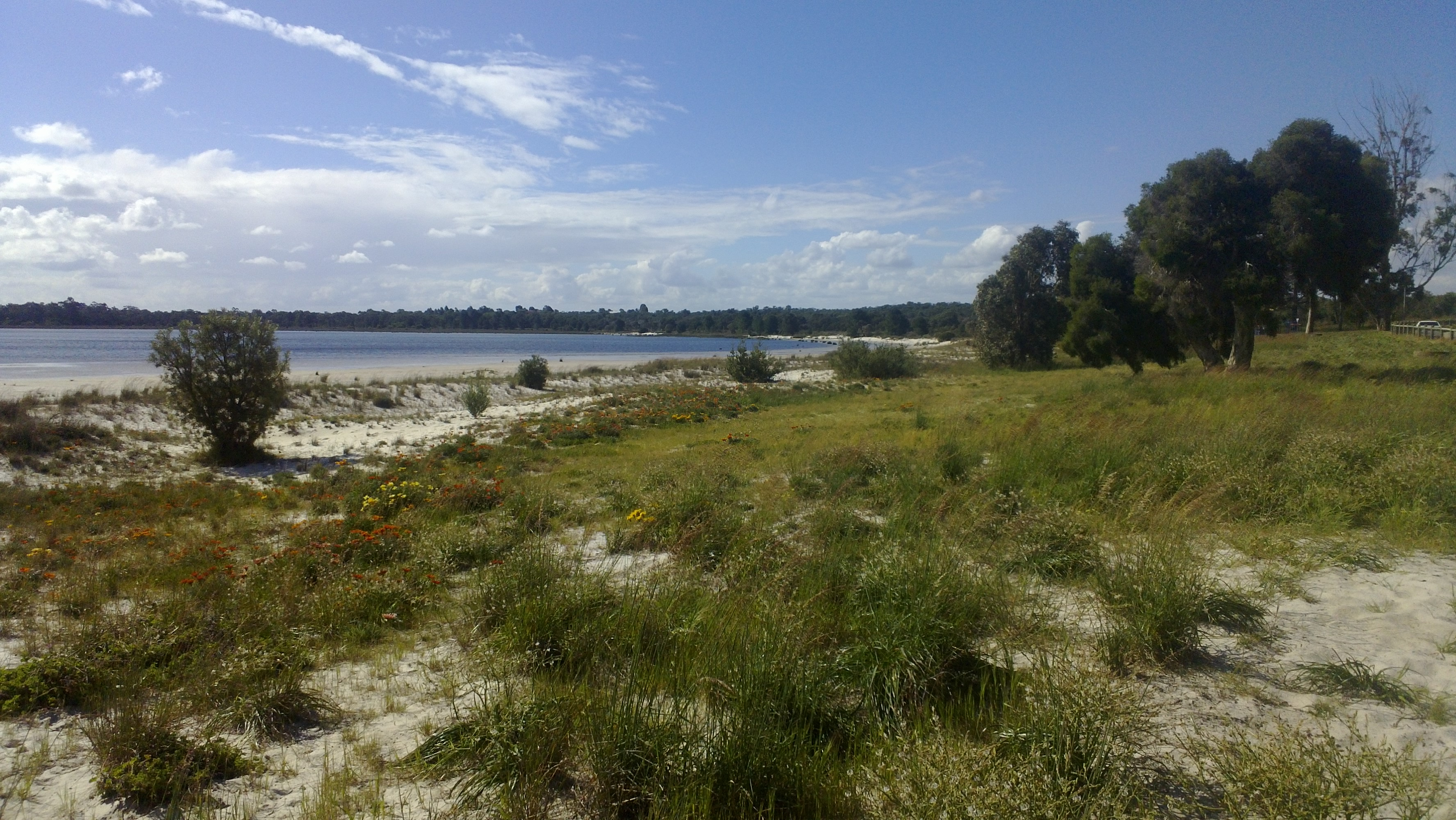
- Lake Gnangara in spring 2012
- Interactive map of Lake Gnangara
- Location: Perth, Western Australia
- Type: Lake
- Primary inflows: Groundwater (Gnangara Mound)
- Primary outflows: None (closed basin)
- Basin countries: Australia
- Frozen: No

Lake Gnangara is the most southerly of the Wanneroo wetlands in metropolitan Perth, Western Australia.

The state government's Wetland Atlas defines the body of water as a lake. The surrounding terrain consists of low dunes and undulating sand plains. The lake is fed by ground water of the Gnangara Mound which is contained by a thin layer of clay.

Previous uses have included diatomaceous earth mining, which may have contributed to changes in the lake's characteristics and ecology. The area is now the subject of a conservation plan and management strategies, and protected from potential disturbance by mining activities.

The Lake reserve is an important part of the management of the mound.

The lake surroundings were the site of a long term Nyoongar camp as well as a Nyoongar community college.

== See also ==
- List of lakes of Western Australia
