= Gnangara Mound =

Aquifer in Perth, Western Australia

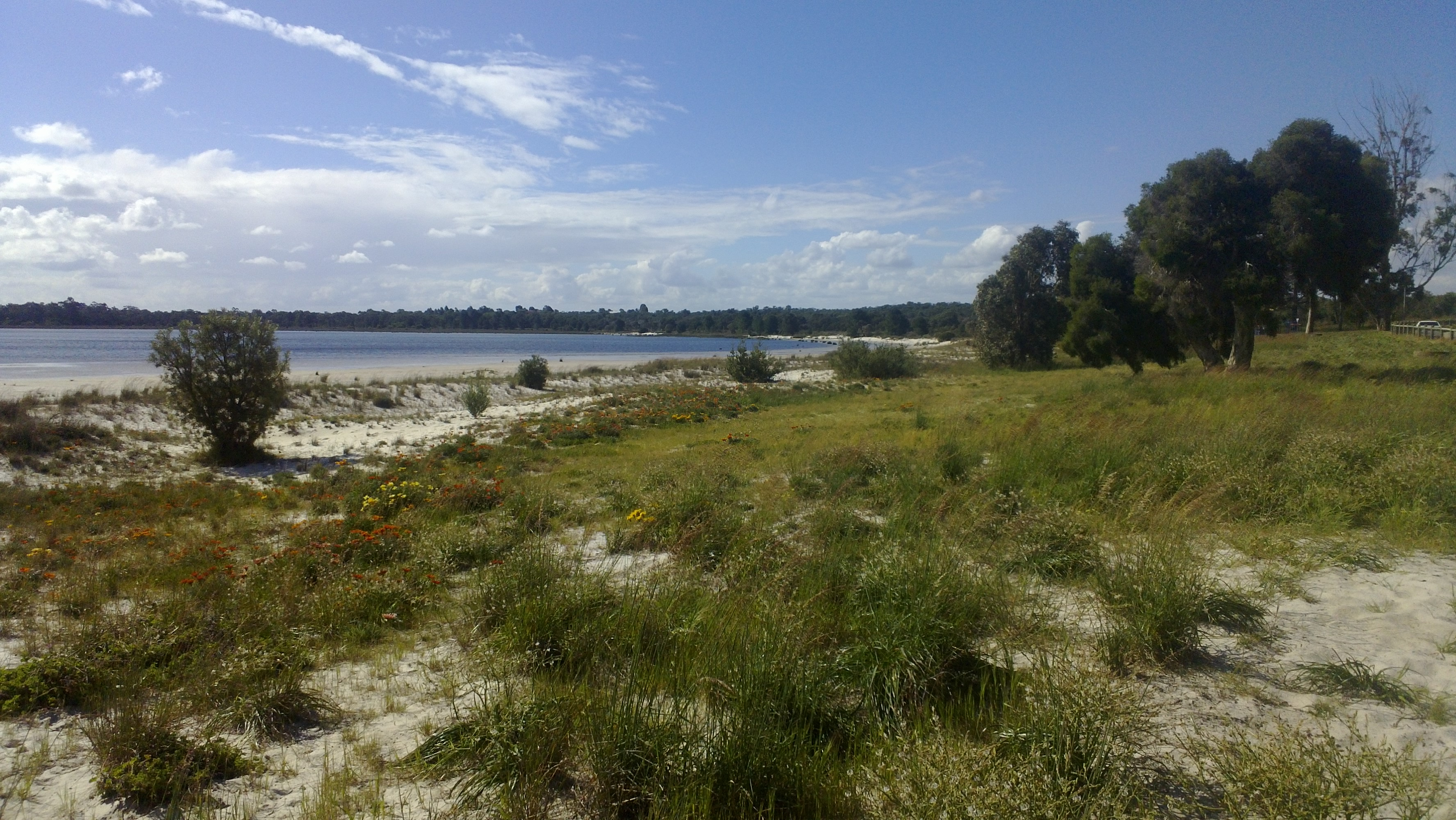
Lake Gnangara is fed by ground water of the Gnangara Mound.

The Gnangara Mound is an area north of Perth, Western Australia where a large mound of sandy soil reaches an elevation of about 60 metres (200 ft). It stores about 20 cubic kilometres (710 billion cubic feet) of fresh water, about one hundred times Perth's current annual water usage. It is currently the single most important source of potable water for the city. Together with the Jandakot Mound in the south of Perth it supplies about 35%–50% of the city's drinking water.

However, studies have shown that water levels in the Gnangara Mound have fallen substantially in recent times. This has had a significant impact on nearby groundwater-dependent ecosystems such as the Wanneroo wetlands and the Yanchep caves. The problem has also been causing acidification of the nearby Lakes Gnangara, Jandabup, Wilgarup and Mariginiup. The remaining mound springs of the Swan Coastal Plain depend on the aquifer and are susceptible to any dramatic change in hydrology. It is widely recognised that sustainability of the Mound as a water resource is under threat. Depletion has been blamed on a combination of climate change and excessive drawing of water.
