= Swan Coastal Plain =

Bioregion in Western Australia

Swan Coastal Plain Swan Coastal Plain scrub and woodlands
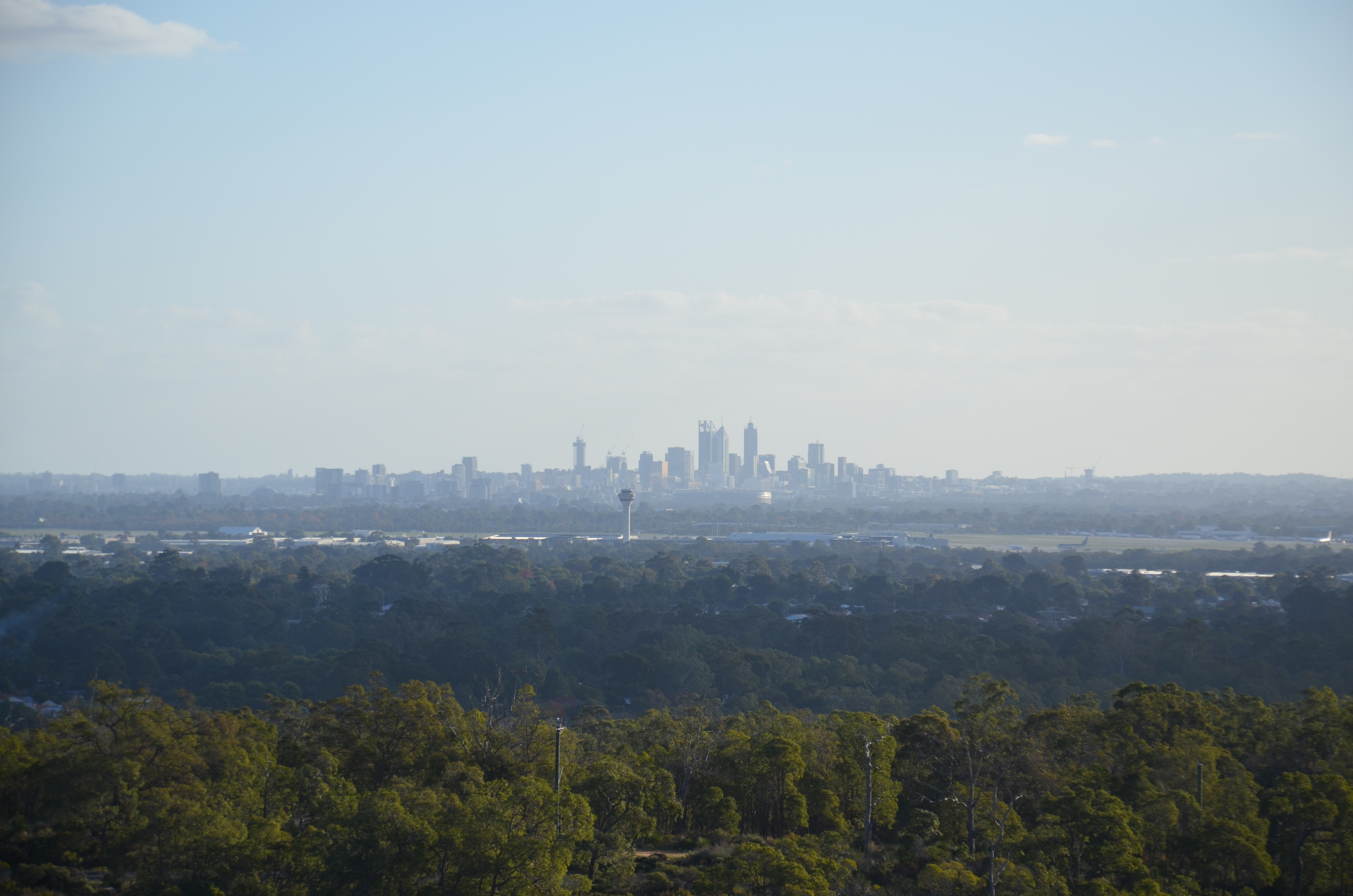
- Swan Coastal Plain from Darling Scarp

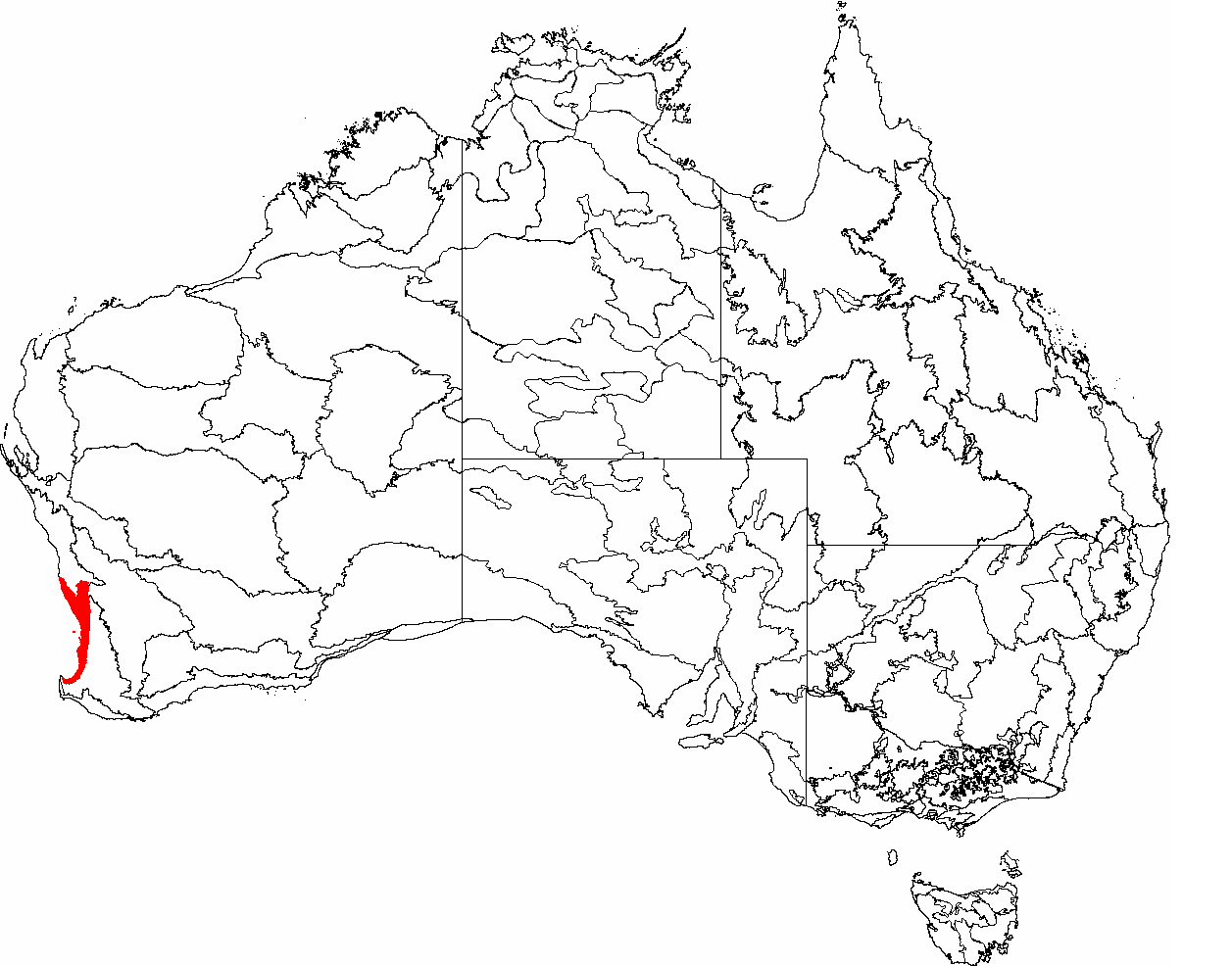
- Map of IBRA regions with the Swan Coastal Plain in red

Ecology
- Realm: Australasian
- Biome: Mediterranean forests, woodlands, and scrub
- Borders: Southwest Australia woodlands

Geography
- Area: 15,280 km^{2} (5,900 mi^{2})
- Country: Australia
- State: Western Australia
- Coordinates: 31.82°S 115.84°E

Conservation
- Conservation status: Critical / endangered

The Swan Coastal Plain in Western Australia is the geographic feature that contains the Swan River as it travels west to the Indian Ocean. The coastal plain continues well beyond the boundaries of the Swan River and its tributaries, as a geological and biological zone, one of Western Australia's Interim Biogeographic Regionalisation for Australia regions. It is also one of the distinct physiographic provinces of the larger West Australian Shield division.

== Location and description ==
The coastal plain is a 30-kilometre-wide (19 mi) strip on the Indian Ocean coast directly west of the Darling Scarp uplands running from Cape Naturaliste in the south to north of the city of Perth. The plain mainly consists of fairly infertile sandy soil along with coastal sand dunes, river estuaries, and a number of wetlands kept back from the sea by the dunes. A number of rivers cross the plain from east to west from the Darling Scarp towards the sea, including the Swan and its main tributary, the Canning.

The sediments of the Perth Basin are Tertiary and Quaternary in age immediately below Perth and include coquina, travertine, and sandy limestones with abundant shelly material. Perth is sited on a set of sand dunes formed during the Pliocene-Pleistocene during the last ice age. Offshore, the sand dune system and surficial deposits transition into a system of partly eroded limestones and sandy limestones. These form a series of drowned cuestas, which today form submerged reefs.

Because of the steepness and orientation of the Darling Scarp, watercourses run off the scarp in a westerly direction. On reaching the Swan Coastal Plain, they encounter two obstacles: firstly, the high permeability of the soil results in the loss of much water. Much flow is lost, and some watercourses simply cease to flow, for example, Wungong Brook, Cardup Brook, and Manjedal Brook. Secondly, the sequence of north-to-south-oriented dunes create obstacles to further westerly flow. Many watercourses turn at right angles and flow south or north along the dune swales, and in some cases this allows multiple watercourses to coalesce. For example, on reaching the coastal plain, Ellen Brook runs south for around 30 kilometres (19 mi), picking up a number of watercourses along the way, before finally emptying into the Swan River. Another example is the Serpentine River, which runs west to less than 10 kilometres (6.2 mi) from the coast, then turns south, running parallel with the coast for nearly 20 kilometres (12 mi) before disgorging into Peel Inlet.

== Coastal dunes and Wanneroo wetlands ==
The dune topology also results in extensive north-to-south-oriented chains of wetlands, again located in the swales. For example, the chain of lakes north of Perth includes lakes of the Wanneroo wetlands including – Lake Pinjar, Jandabup Lake and Gnangara Lake. The large bodies of water in the estuary of the Swan River, Perth Water and Melville Water are also located in dune swales.

== Geology ==
The Swan coastal plain is characterised by a series of sand dune systems, the Quindalup dunes, the Spearwood dunes, and the Bassendean dunes, which run from west to east (in increasing age) from the coastline to the major faults which form the eastern boundary of the plain. The plain is bounded to the east by the Darling Scarp, to the north by a subsidiary fault running north-west from Bullsbrook, and to the south by the Collie-Naturaliste Scarp. The Pinjarra plain lies between the Bassendean dunes and the eastern scarps. Early work on all three dune systems considered them to have been formed at differing times by the deposition of sands carried by wind (aeolian) or by river processes (fluviatile). More recently, later authors have argued that these sandplains are mostly the product of in situ weathering.

The carbonate material of all three dune systems has been completely leached, leaving dunes which consist solely of quartz sand. Within the Spearwood dunes, the yellow or grey sand may be several metres thick.

The dune systems have been much studied; the water retained within the Gnangara Mound supplies much of Perth's water needs.

== Climate ==
The Swan Coastal Plain is encompassed within the greater Noongar region, and the traditional weather knowledge of the Noongar people identifies six distinct seasons in an annual cycle. These seasons, known as birak, bunuru, djeran, makuru, djilba and kambarang, are indicated by changes in local flora and fauna, and have spiritual and cultural significance.

The region has experienced declining annual rainfall since 1900, and some of the lowest on record since April 2023.

== Ecology ==
Southwest Australia is recognised as a biodiversity hotspot, including parts of the Swan Coastal Plain. In particular, the region between Busselton and Augusta in the south of the Plain is considered ecologically significant. The Swan Coastal Plain is a specific botanical province.

=== Flora ===
Southwestern Australia is very rich in flora, with an estimated 8,000 species, a quarter of which can be found on this coastal strip. The traditional flora of the dunes and the fairly infertile plain was dense shrubby kwongan heathland adapted to the poor soils, dry summers, and regular fires. Kwongan vegetation contains a large number of endemic plant species, especially shrubs and wildflowers, including yellow flame and toothbrush grevilleas, fan-flowers, and cockies' tongues. The heath is scattered with woodland of Banksia and other trees including the red-blossomed quandong (desert peach) and firewood banksia. Going further inland, especially in river valleys where the soil is better, eucalyptus woodlands including tuart (Eucalyptus gomphocephala) occur. The wetlands meanwhile have been particularly important ecologically, supporting a rich habitat of many plant varieties.

The Swan Coastal Plain is a particularly important centre for certain types of plants, including Banksia, but also Caladenia orchids and Leucopogon shrubs, indeed some genera, such as the Dryandra series of Banksia and the Synaphea flowers are found nowhere else in the world. Other flora of the plain includes a type of mistletoe called the Christmas tree.

=== Fauna ===
The coastal plains are home to a number of marsupials from the large western grey kangaroo to the very small southwestern pygmy possum and mouse-like honey possum. Remnant populations of some marsupials are found on offshore islands including the tammar wallaby and the quokka, the latter particularly on Rottnest Island. The coastal plains skink, discovered in 2012, is endemic to sand dunes in the area, and is threatened by residential development.

=== Threats and preservation ===
Much of the plain has been cleared for agriculture and urban development, especially in and around Perth, where the heath has been almost entirely cleared as far as the Darling Scarp and the city is spreading up and down the coast. Although some areas are protected, clearance is going on while the plant disease Phytophthora dieback and changes to traditional fire regimens affect the heathland vegetation including the Banksia trees. Protected areas include Kings Park, Beeliar Wetlands, Star Swamp, Hepburn Heights Bushland, Canning River Regional Park, Bold Park, Whiteman Park, Kensington Bushland and Thomsons Lake.

== History ==
Traditionally, this area was under the care and control of the Yued, Whadjuk, Binjareb, and Wardandi Noongar peoples, whose hunter-gathering firestick farming practices maintained the climax vegetations old growth forests observed at the time of first contact. At this time, the kwongan heathland was much more widespread along the coast.

In the 1830s, it was originally named Great Plain of Quartania or Plain of Quartania by James Stirling, the first governor of Western Australia, but those terms have fallen into disuse.

European settlement led to many of the wetlands areas being drained for land reclamation to take advantage of the fertile soil for farming enterprises, and for expansion of parks and recreation areas. The city of Perth sits on an area of reclaimed wetlands. Between 49% (Riggert, 1966) and 80% (Godfrey, 1989) of the wetlands on the coastal plain is thought to have been drained, filled, or cleared since 1832. Lake Monger and Herdsman Lake are the last two major wetlands remaining in close proximity to the city.

Lake Monger was originally part of a series of freshwater wetlands running north from the Swan River along the coastal plain for about 50 kilometres (31 mi). Lake Monger with Georgiana Lake and Lake Sutherland (both near Mitchell Freeway, near Sutherland and Newcastle streets) and Herdsman Lake made up what was known as "The Great Lakes District". Other lakes and swamps in the immediate northern vicinity of the early Perth township were Lake Kingsford (site of the current Perth railway station), Lake Irwin (Perth Entertainment Centre) and further north were Stone's Lake (Perth Oval), Lake Poullet (First Swamp, part of what is now Birdwood Square), Lake Thomson (Mews Swamp, between Lake, Brisbane, and Beaufort Streets) and Lake Henderson (parts of what is now Robertson Park and Dorrien Gardens). Further north still lay Second Swamp (Bulwer Street, east of Lake Street), Third Swamp (Hyde Park), and Three Island Lake and Smith's Lake (now Charles Veryard Reserve). Many of these lakes formed a natural interconnected drainage system which found its way into the Swan River at East Perth through Claise Brook. In 1833, water draining from Lakes Kingsford, Irwin, Sutherland, and Henderson was used to drive a water-driven mill located in Mill Street.

== See also ==
- Islands of Perth, Western Australia
