= Lake Joondalup =

Freshwater lake in Perth, Western Australia

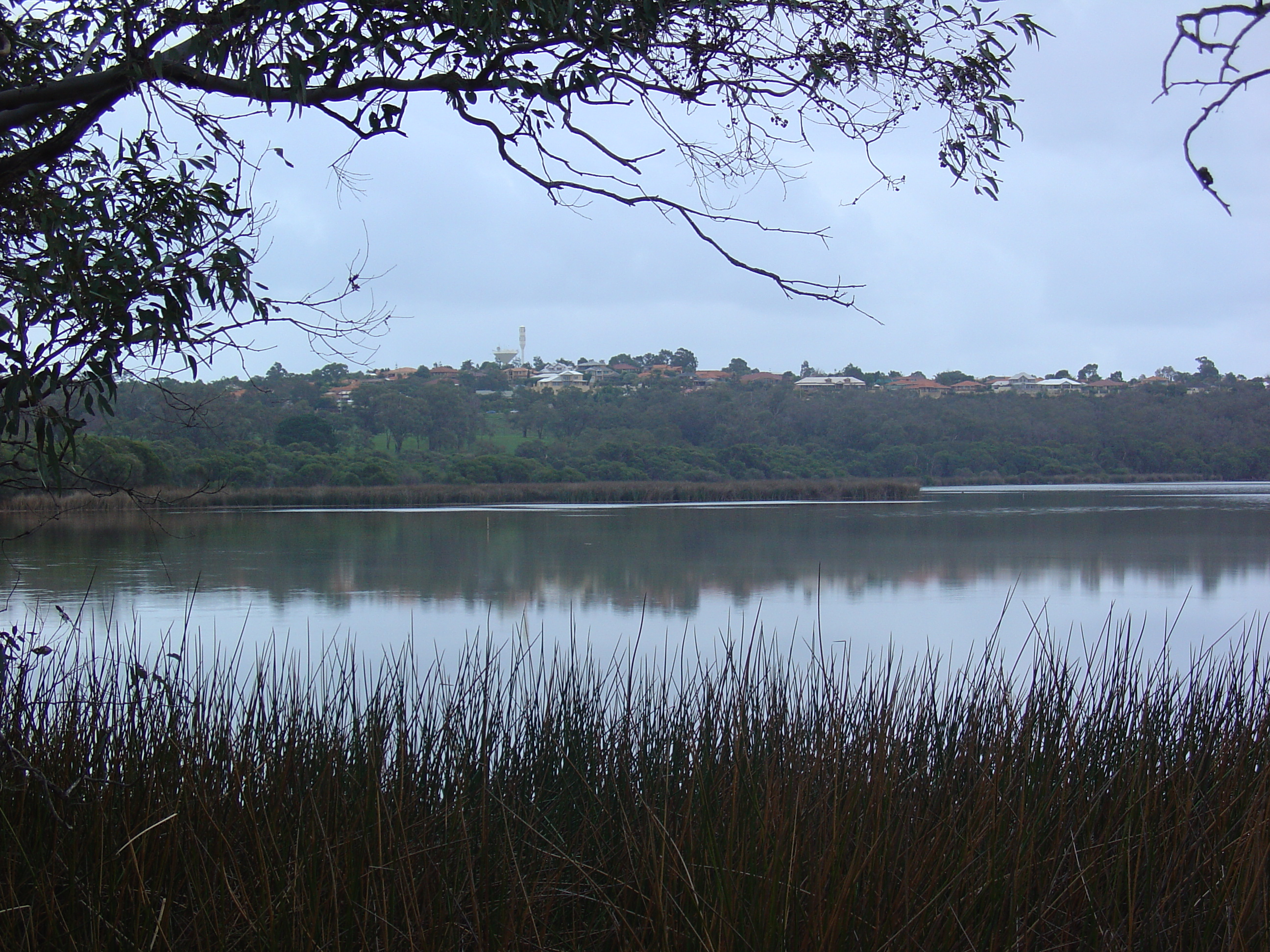
- A view looking westward over the lake

- Location within Western Australia
- Interactive map of Lake Joondalup
- Location: Joondalup, Western Australia
- Coordinates: 31°44′42.63″S 115°47′05.37″E
- Type: Freshwater
- Basin countries: Australia
- Designation: Yellagonga Regional Park

Lake Joondalup is a freshwater lake in Perth, Western Australia. It is in the Perth northern suburbs of Joondalup, Wanneroo, and Edgewater. It is a nature reserve and part of the Yellagonga Regional Park.

== Description ==
Lake Joondalup is Perth's largest metropolitan freshwater lake in the Yellagonga Regional Park. It has several islands, and a large sandbank during the dry summer months. The largest island is colloquially named "Snake Island" by locals for good reason as the wetland habitat supports a healthy population of various snakes, including the dugite and tiger snake. The lake and bush reserve is a dynamic habitat supporting much wildlife including turtles, ducks and many other birds. Most of the banks are either swampland or reeds.

Significant natural attractions include Neil Hawkins Park, Joondalup and Picnic Cove, and Edgewater. Neil Hawkins Park was named after a chairman of the former Metropolitan Region Planning Authority, and is a popular family park for tourists as well as locals. There is a small jetty over the lake and visitors can feed birds (although this practise is now discouraged), and have a barbecue. Limestone caves are located on its western shore just north of Neil Hawkins Park. Edgewater is also the highest point to look out over the lake. It was formerly the site of a limestone quarry; many parks in the suburb have sheer cliffs and exposed limestone karst features exposed during its time as a quarry.

The areas around Lake Joondalup are home to many birds, including waterbirds on the lake. The reserve lies within the Northern Swan Coastal Plain Important Bird Area, so identified by BirdLife International because of its importance in supporting several thousand short-billed black cockatoos during the non-breeding season. It is also home to many types of frog.

== See also ==
- List of lakes of Australia § Western Australia
