= Daisy Bates (author) =

Irish-Australian journalist known for her work with Aboriginal People

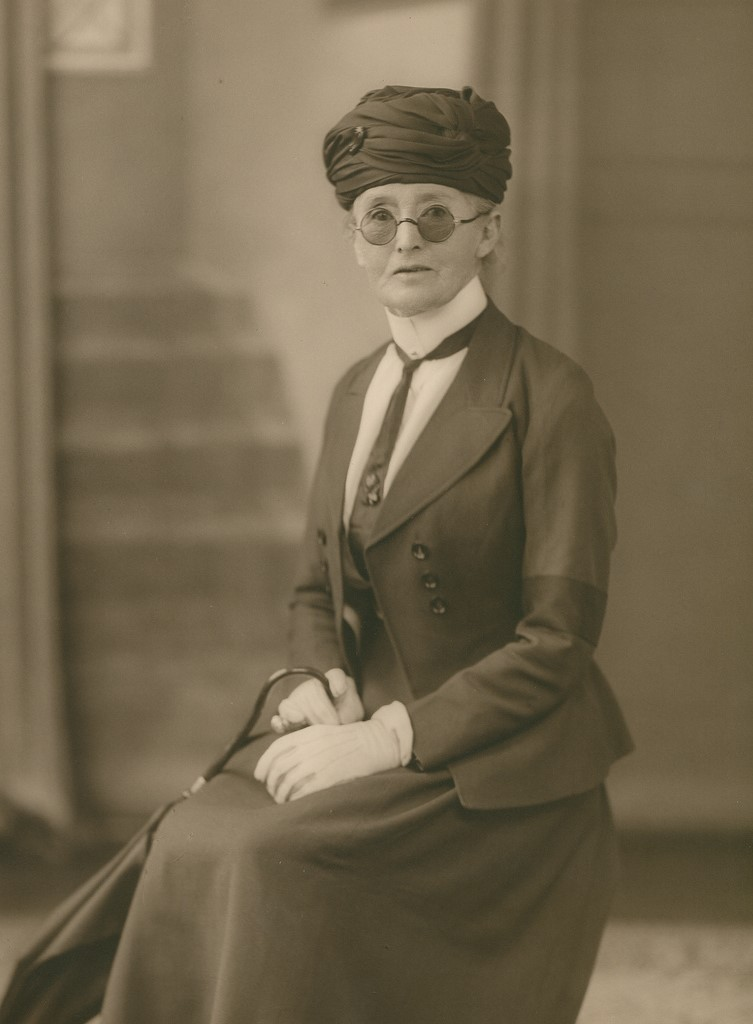
- Bates in 1936
- Born: Margaret May O'Dwyer; 16 October 1859; Roscrea, County Tipperary, Ireland
- Died: 18 April 1951 (aged 91); Adelaide, South Australia, Australia
- Resting place: North Road Cemetery, Nailsworth, South Australia
- Occupation: Journalist
- Spouse(s): Harry Harbord 'Breaker' Morant, possible bigamous marriage to John (Jack) Bates and definite bigamous marriage to Ernest C. Baglehole
- Children: Arnold Hamilton Bates

Daisy May Bates, CBE (born Margaret May O'Dwyer; 16 October 1859 – 18 April 1951) was an Irish-Australian journalist, welfare worker and self-taught anthropologist who conducted fieldwork among several Aboriginal groups in western and southern Australia.

Born in Country Tipperary, Ireland in 1859, Bates migrated to Australia in 1883 where she married three times (at least one of which was bigamous) and gave birth to a son. She returned to England in 1894 and worked as a journalist and editor. She migrated to Western Australia in 1899, where she bought a cattle station and developed an interest in the culture and welfare of Aboriginal Australians. She published a number of articles on Aboriginal issues and from 1904 to 1910 was employed by the Western Australian government to collect ethnographic information on the Aboriginal people of that state. Her research and field work was published posthumously in 1985 as The Native Tribes of Western Australia. Bates was appointed as a Travelling Protector of Aborigines in 1910 and continued to conduct research and welfare work among Aboriginal groups when this position ended in 1911.

In 1919, Bates moved to a remote camp in Ooldea, South Australia, where she lived for 16 years, conducting welfare work and field studies among the Pitjantjatjara Aboriginal people and becoming a prominent participant in public debate on Aboriginal issues. Her life and work had come to the attention of the royal family and she was appointed C.B.E. in 1934. Bates moved to Adelaide in 1935 and spent most of the rest of her life in South Australia where she often continued to live with Aboriginal people. A series of semi-autobiographical articles, "My Natives and I", appeared in 1936 and were adapted into the book The Passing of the Aborigines, published in 1938. Her physical and mental health deteriorated in the 1940s and she died in a nursing home in Adelaide in 1951.

Bates is a controversial figure in the history of Indigenous Australians as well as in Australian history more broadly. Although she wrote sympathetically about Aboriginal society and welfare, commentators have criticised her for paternalistic attitudes which were often typical of her time. Scholars consider her anthropological work to include valuable ethnographic data on Aboriginal Australians, in particular the peoples of Western Australia. However, it has been criticised for inaccuracies, as well as exaggerated and often erroneous claims about Aboriginal cannibalism. Her reliability has also been questioned due to false claims she made about her personal history.

== Biography ==
=== Early life: 1859 to 1882 ===
Bates was born as Margaret May O'Dwyer on 16 October 1859, in County Tipperary, in British ruled Ireland. She had six siblings, including a twin brother named Francis. Francis and another sibling, Joe, died young (with Francis dying two weeks after being born). When Bates was four, her mother, Bridget (née Hunt), died of tuberculosis on 20 February 1864. Her Catholic bootmaker father, James Edward O'Dwyer, now widowed, hired Mary Dillon to look after his six children. Seven months later they were married and attempted to emigrate to the United States. Her father however died "en route", also in 1864.

After her father and stepmother left for the US, Bates and her siblings were split up between relatives. Bates and three of her younger siblings were sent to live with her grandmother, Catherine Hunt, called 'Granny Hunt' by Bates. After Granny Hunt died in 1868, Bates returned to live with her stepmother, Mary, who had managed to return to Ireland and take over as householder. Bates (now nine years old) and her eldest sister, Kathleen, were sent to the Free National School for Catholic Girls in Dublin. She stayed there until she was nineteen, likely working as a pupil-teacher. (Note: Blackburn gives Daisy's age as eighteen. More recent work by de Vries found that Daisy was a year older.)

After leaving school, Bates was employed as a family governess in London. Not much is known of her time in London, except that she first met Ernest Baglehole there, who was the son of a wealthy ship and factory owner. Bates was rejected as a bride for Baglehole, who had already been arranged to marry another woman. Bates seems to have then been dismissed from her position. Possibly humiliated and desiring to start anew, Bates planned to emigrate to Australia.

=== Emigration and life in eastern Australia: 1882 to 1894 ===
Daisy Bates and two of her husbands
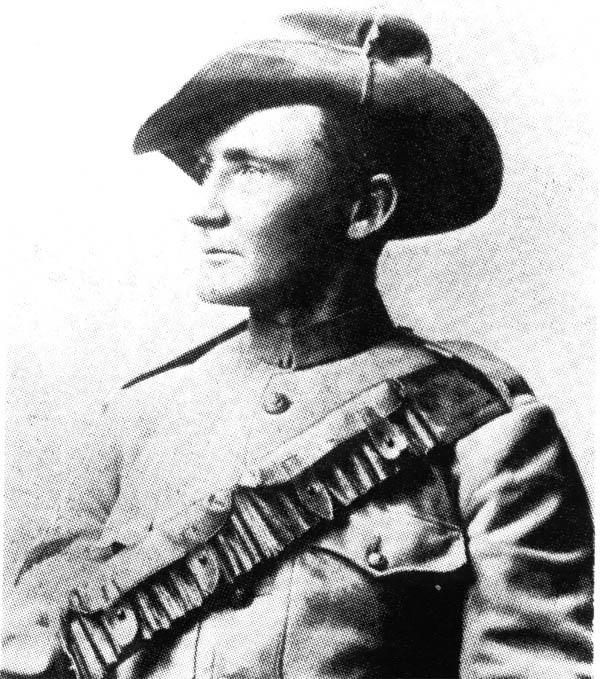
Breaker Morant, in military uniform, 1900

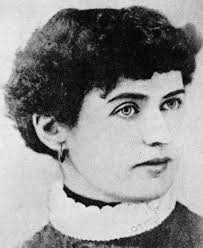
Bates shortly after her arrival in Queensland, 1883

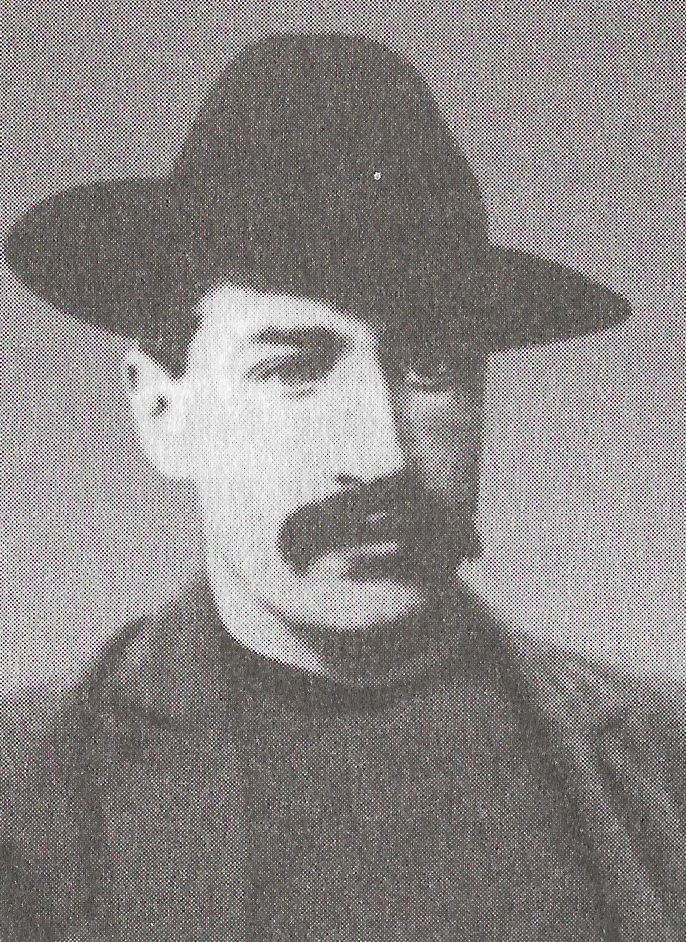
Jack Bates

On 22 November 1882, Bates boarded RMS Almora, en route to Townsville in Queensland, Australia, as part of an immigration scheme reserved for "Catholic girls of 'good character' aged between fifteen and twenty-one." Bates, being twenty-three at the time, lied about her age to receive the government-assisted concessional fare. After arriving in Townsville on 15 January 1883, Bates's whereabouts for the next year is unclear. It is known that Bates was in Charters Towers for some period of time before November 1883, as a coroner's inquest report into the death/suicide of a man named "Arnold Knight Colquhoun" includes a suicide note that was intended for her.

By the beginning of 1884, Bates had found employment as a governess on Fanning Downs cattle station, 40 kilometres (25 mi) outside of Charters Towers. Breaker Morant was also employed there, but as a "horse-boy". On 13 March 1884, they married in Charters Towers. The marriage was not legal; in Queensland, a man had to be at least twenty-one to get married but Morant was only nineteen (he claimed to be twenty-one).

About a month later, Bates learned that Morant had paid for neither the reverend nor the jeweller, and that he had stolen several pigs and a saddle. Morant spent only a week in jail for the thefts (the case was dismissed) and shortly afterwards Bates and Morant separated. They never officially divorced, likely due to the cost, divorces only being granted under specific circumstances, and the divorce laws unilaterally favouring men. Bates then moved and kept their marriage a secret.

By the end of 1884, Bates had found employment as a governess and maid on a small property in Nowra, NSW. Here she met Jack Bates on Christmas Eve, the eldest son of her employer and a drover. He proposed a few days later and they married on 17 February 1885. Her marriage certificate gives her age as twenty-one, though she was twenty-five. Due to his occupation, Jack would sometimes spend months away at a time, having to move cattle over great distances.

Bates also married Ernest Baglehole (Note: The son of a past employer in London and who she had been rejected as a bride for. See under 'Early life'.) that year on 10 June 1885, at St Stephen's Anglican Church, Newtown, Sydney, again claiming to be twenty-one years old. She had received a letter from him three days after her wedding to Jack Bates, who by then had already left for work. It is not known how Baglehole managed to find Bates. Little about their relationship is known; Bates later burned their letters, wedding photos and her diaries, nor is any record of his death known. (Note: It is known that he was already married, had two children, and had arrived in Australia working as fourth-mate aboard the merchant vessel Zealandia.)

Daisy Bates's only child, Arnold Hamilton Bates, was born on 26 August 1886 in Bathurst, New South Wales. While he was officially the son of Jack Bates, some biographers speculate that his actual father was Baglehole. The polygamous nature of Bates's marriages was kept secret during her lifetime.

=== Return to England: 1894 to 1899 ===
On 9 February 1894, Bates returned to England. (Note: She did so for free by taking a job as a stewardess aboard the barquentine, Macquarie) Before leaving she enrolled her son in a Catholic boarding school in Campbelltown, NSW and planned for him to stay with his paternal grandmother during the summer holidays at Pyree. She told Jack that she would return to Australia only when he had a home established for her. She arrived penniless in England as her bank had failed in a recession.

After arriving in London, she went home to Roscrea for some time, before returning once again to London. There she found a job working for journalist and social campaigner W. T. Stead. Despite her sceptical views, she worked as an assistant editor on the psychic quarterly Borderlands. She left Stead's employment in 1896. It is unclear how she supported herself until 1899. That year she set sail for Western Australia after Jack wrote to say that he was looking for a property there.

=== Emigration to Western Australia: 1899 to 1914 ===
==== Growth as a writer: 1899 to 1904 ====
Daisy Bates's whereabouts from 1900 to 1904

On her return voyage she met Father Dean Martelli, a Roman Catholic priest who had worked with Aboriginal people and who gave her an insight into the dire conditions they faced. It was suggested that she join an expedition to a Catholic Mission at Beagle Bay, where a dictionary of Nyulnyul, the local language, was being compiled.

She arrived in Fremantle with enough money to buy the lease for a large plot of land named Ethel Creek Station, several hundred cattle, and a block of land in Fremantle. The source of this great sum of money is unknown. She found a Catholic boarding school in Perth for her son, Arnold, and organised for him to stay with another family. She became involved in the Karrakatta Club where she met Dr Roberta Jull. (Note: Bates would go on to aid Dr Jull in researching Aboriginal women's health, and would give Dr Jull a paper titled The West Australian Aborigines: Their marriage laws and some peculiar customs to be read at a medical conference in Glasgow in 1906.)

Shortly after 1900 began, Jack Bates left for Ethel Creek Station and Daisy Bates followed in March. She travelled via a coastal steamship to Cossack, joined Jack and made their way to Ethel Creek Station. After arranging the building of a cattle run and homestead, they began the return journey home; first to Port Hedland and then Carnarvon by buggy, and then to Perth via steamer.

In August (no more than a month after arriving back in Perth), Bates joined Bishop Matthew Gibney and Father Martelli to the mission at Beagle Bay. Before arriving, they stayed in Broome for a few weeks. While there, Bates witnessed the sex trafficking of Aboriginal women within the pearling industry. While in Beagle Bay, Bates assisted in nursing unwell Aboriginal women, (Note: "Many were suffering from malnutrition, as well as from diseases that included leprosy, yaws and syphilis given them by Europeans.") repairing buildings, fences and wells, and in yarding cattle.

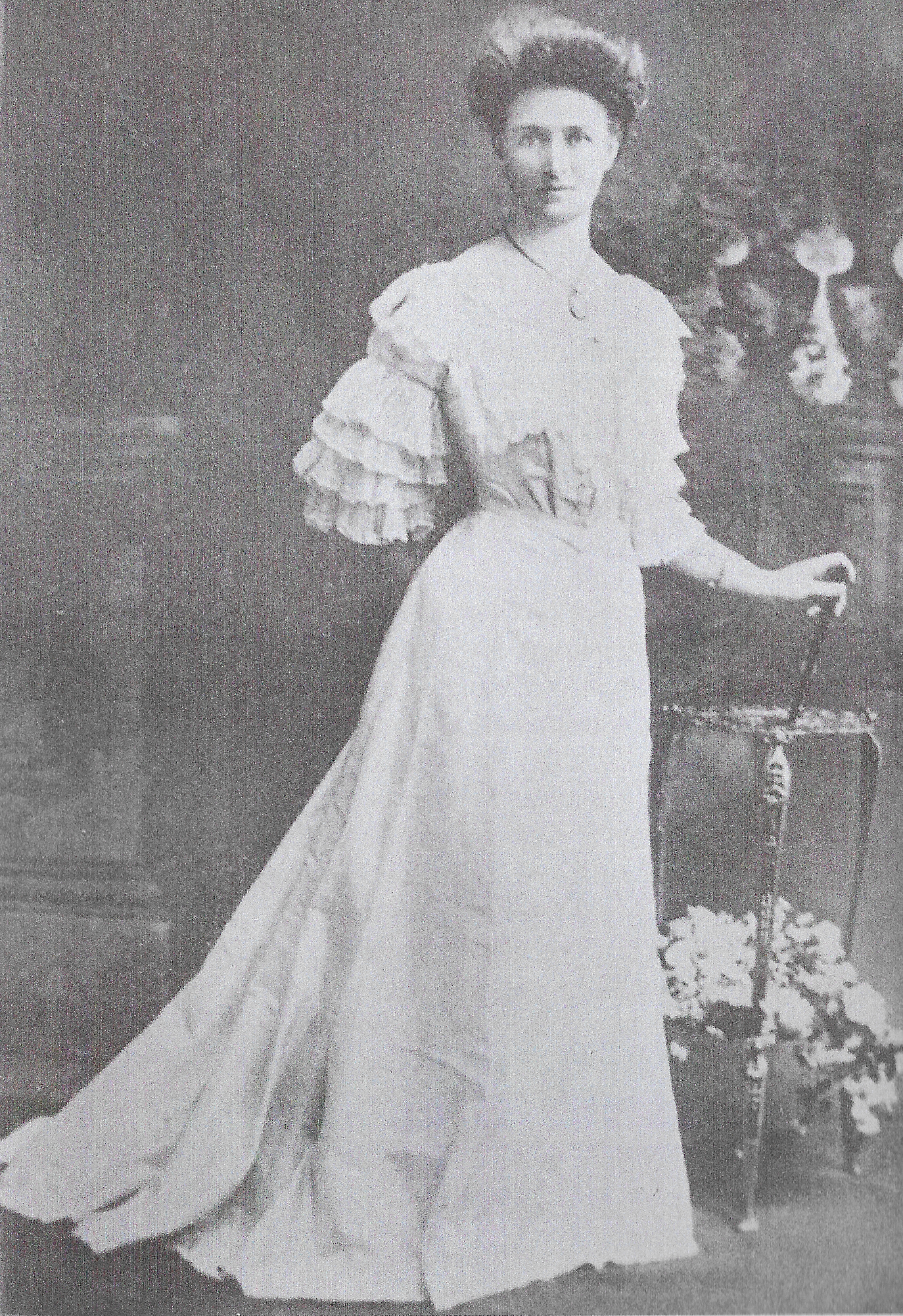
Photograph of Bates, taken on the day she met the duke

They had returned to Perth by March 1901. She was invited to a garden party at Government House on 24 July 1901, where George V; (Note: At the time, George was only the Duke of York.) retrieved her umbrella after she dropped it, making the umbrella a treasured heirloom of hers. Bates soon published two articles in Western Australia's Department of Agriculture's journal. The first article, titled Possibilities of Tropical Agriculture in Nor' west, was published in July 1901 and is primarily focused on the agricultural successes of the mission at Beagle Bay. The second article, titled From Port Hedland to Carnarvon by Buggy, was published two months later and is an account of her trip with Jack after leaving their cattle station.

In February 1902, the Bates family moved to Broome, where Jack had a job on Roebuck Plains Station. They left on a droving trip with 700–1000 cattle in April. (Note: They headed south along the coast, followed De Grey River inland, crossed to Roy Hill Station where 500 cattle were left, and then arrived at Ethel Creek Station.) The drive was a failure as 200 cattle intended for Ethel Creek station were lost. Bates rested at the station before leaving for Perth, where she arrived on 21 November 1902. She covered over 1,000 kilometres (620 mi) in this six month long trip, providing material for a series of articles titled Through the Nor-West on a Side-Saddle. (Note: She wrote about this trip again, twenty years later, titling the article Over 3,000 Miles on a Side-Saddle.) These were published in the Catholic paper The W.A. Record, which was managed by Bishop Gibney. Her first published writings on Aboriginal Australians are in these articles, many of which use deprecatory language. In the articles she published soon after the trip, as well as in the article she published twenty years later, she omitted any mention of Jack.

During 1901 and 1902, Bates had collected information on various dialects, practices and oral histories of the peoples of the Kimberley region. This material went largely unpublished until 1985. (Note: Her manuscript, titled The Native Tribes of Western Australia, was not published until edited by anthropologist Isobel White. See under "Beginning of anthropological career" for more details.)

Bates's employment at the W.A. Record ended sometime in May 1903. On 4 August she became the first woman to publish an article in the engineering journal, Cassier's Magazine. (Note: It was on the Coolgardie Water Scheme. Arnold, who had taken an apprenticeship at the engineering firm (Hoskins and Company) that had been contracted to make 300 miles (480 km) of steel pipe used in the dam project, possibly helped her.) She omitted her gender by signing the article as "D.M.B". In December she was hired by the Western Mail to write a series of articles on mining in the Murchison goldfields of Western Australia, which she travelled through for three months.

==== Beginning of anthropological career: 1904 to 1914 ====
On 3 May 1904, the Registrar General of Western Australia, Malcolm Fraser, temporarily appointed her to research Aboriginal customs and languages. She started by compiling a questionnaire which was "sent to white males who exercised some measure of control over Aboriginal people" and by reading ethnographic material held by libraries across the state.

On 24 May, Bates responded to a letter in The Times that had argued Western Australia to be a slave state due to many Aboriginal workers being indentured on pastoral stations. Bates claimed that Western Australia was doing more for Aboriginal people than any other state, denied that the indenture system was cruel, and wrote that most station owners were humane and "will not wantonly ill-treat their natives."

In 1905 she learned of the Welshpool Aboriginal Reserve, called Maamba by the Noongar people; it was 6 km from Cannington, at the foot of the Darling Range. After visiting a few times, she camped for a short period and interviewed a number of Noongar Elders (including Fanny Balbuk). She wrote an article on the customs of the Aboriginal people of Western Australia, focusing on marriage laws. (Note: It was read at a meeting of the Victorian branch of the Royal Geographical Society and at Perth's Natural History Society. It was also adapted into a series of articles for the Western Mail in April 1906.)

Her position was originally to last one year but she managed to repeatedly extend her position until it ended in 1910. (Note: The extensions were granted through her repeated requests to extend the range of her fieldwork in order to authenticate her findings, utilisation of her newspaper articles to promote public support and some government officials approving of her work.) Over this time she conducted further fieldwork: she visited towns and "reserves" through much of the South-West, as far east as Kalgoorlie and as far north as Wilgie Mia. This work would result in her book, The Native Tribes of Western Australia, which would not be published until 1985 after being edited by anthropologist Isobel Mary White. (Note: The government printer rejected her manuscript, which was very long and would have required considerable editing, as being too expensive to print. Bates attributed this unexpected rejection to "the meanness of the [new] Labor Government". The wordlists she collected have been made publicly accessible through the Digital Daisy Bates project.)

She sent two copies of her work to Andrew Lang who shared her work with Alfred Radcliffe-Brown as Brown and his assistant, E. L. Grant Watson, were going to Western Australia to conduct ethnological fieldwork. Colonial Secretary James Connolly, wishing to end Bates's employment and the government's costly responsibility of publishing her book, had an agreement brokered; in return for the government paying her salary for six months, she would join the expedition and Brown would take responsibility for publishing her book. For the duration of the expedition, Bates was appointed as a Travelling Protector of Aborigines, (Note: As the term Aborigines is considered outdated and sometimes offensive, this title will be shortened to Protector from hereon in this section.) becoming the first woman to hold the role in Western Australia. Her appointment "required her to police the moral behaviour of Aboriginal women and girls and clear the Aboriginal camps she visited of children of mixed ethnicity." On 13 October 1910, they left Fremantle for Geraldton via steamer. In less than a month, Bates reported at least two Aboriginal children so that they would be taken away by police.

Shark bay; Bernier and Dorre island seen in the top left.

From Geraldton they travelled by train to the outskirts of the town, Sandstone. They joined a group of camping Aboriginal people and began their anthropological work, which included making lists of essential words. During their fourth morning there, the camp was raided by mounted police, resulting in the camp being quickly abandoned. (Note: The police were looking for the Aboriginal people who had murdered eleven other Aboriginal people in what is called the "Laverton Massacre", as well as bi-racial children and Aboriginal people who were sick.) Among those taken by police was some number of young bi-racial Aboriginal girls, Bates again assisted the police in this. As bi-racial girls faced the highest risk of being "bartered to Europeans" as servants and for sexual exploitation, she believed they would be better off. She may not have realised that conditions were worse in many government homes.

They left for the lock hospitals on Dorre and Bernier Island where Aboriginal people infected with syphilis and other misidentified infections were being forcibly taken. More than 40% would not return to their homelands. From November 1910 to February 1911, Bates and Brown conducted interviews on both of the islands, (Note: Aboriginal men were kept on Bernier island and women and children on Dorre.) around Carnarvon in camps and in Carnarvon's jail.

On 9 April they boarded a steamer together and returned to Perth. Brown requested the government to extend Bates's employment for six months but two months were granted. Brown continued researching north of Carnarvon and Bates continued hers in Meekatharra and Peak Hill, where she spoke with Wajarri people. When her appointment ended in June, Brown retained her services as a researcher. She applied for the position of Protector in the newly created Northern Territory (Note: It was separated from South Australia on 1 January 1911.) and as a Travelling Inspector in July. She was rejected on the grounds that she did not have the necessary medical qualifications. Bates travelled to Katanning in mid-July, where she and a doctor aided Noongar people infected with measles. She wrote an article for the Western Mail and The West Australian on this experience.

By October, Bates's work for Brown was complete and they returned to Perth. Brown renegotiated his agreement with the government so that he was no longer required to publish Bates's manuscript. Bates then spent some time on Rottnest Island, which was being used as a holiday camping destination and as a forced labour prison for Aboriginal people. (Note: While it had officially closed in 1904, it "continued to operate as a forced labour camp for Aboriginal prisoners until 1931.") She left in February 1912.

Brown returned his (often critically annotated) copy sometime in 1912. (Note: This being after Bates had written to him in April.) Bates then submitted her manuscript to the State Government for publication but the recently elected Premier John Scaddan returned it to her (also in 1912) to publish at her own expense. In June she advertised the leaseholds for her cattle station, Glen Carrick, for the amount required to publish. Andrew Lang, who had been helping Bates edit her manuscript, suffered a fatal stroke on 20 July 1912.

In November, Bates was gazetted as an honorary Protector in the remote Eucla district until 31 December 1913. This was an unpaid position. That same month she left for Eucla via steamer from Albany. She met a Miss Beatrice Raine and Mr Raine (brother and sister) somewhere before reaching Albany and the group proceeded to travel together. From Eucla they travelled 190 km east, aboard a camel buggy, to Nullarbor Plains Station which covered 1,000 sq mi (2,600 km^{2}) and which Mr Raine managed. She stayed at the station until October 1913, leaving as Mr Raine's employment was about to end.

She returned to Eucla and began to build trust with the Mirning people living there. Camping far outside of town, de Vries says that Bates "overcame loneliness by keeping herself busy and befriending the Aborigines she interviewed." De Vries also says that:

Daisy would often lay extra places for distinguished guests she would have liked to invite to a dinner party. Sitting alone at her card table, she would place photos cut out of old newspapers on the empty plates of her imaginary guests. Poignantly she described how this made her feel she was enjoying their company.

De Vries speculates that this was the first sign of Bates's vascular dementia and that her diet during the periods she camped lacked various nutrients and contributed to her dementia.

Restarting her ethnographic work, she camped in and travelled the area, interviewed various Mirning people and observed initiation ceremonies. She continued to write newspaper articles during this time as they were her only source of income. She did this until March 1914, when she learned her bank had received the first deposit for the sale of her pastoral leases.

=== South Australia: 1914 to 1951 ===
Bates's whereabouts from 1914 to 1935.

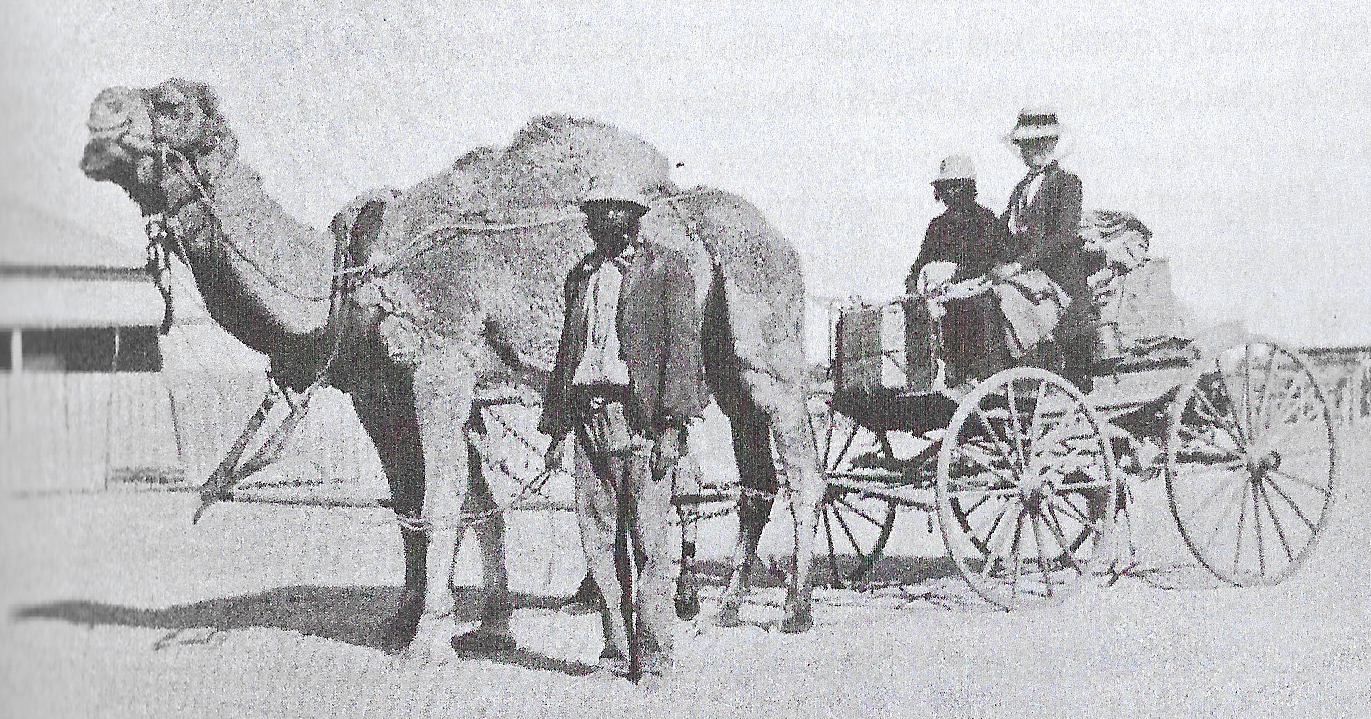
Bates travelling with Gauera (both sitting) and Balgundra (standing)

She hired a camel buggy (Note: Bates had gotten the funds for this by writing to Georgina King, an amateur geologist and anthropologist, who similarly felt marginalised and plagiarised by males in the scientific community.) and in May travelled to Yalata Station with a married couple, Balgundra and Gauera – a Mirning man and Wirangu woman she had become friends with. At Yalata Station, Balgundra and Gauera returned to Eucla aboard the camel buggy. Bates stayed for a month before leaving for Adelaide aboard a steamer.

On 29 July 1914, Bates was interviewed by the South Australian Government's "Committee of Inquiry into Aboriginal Affairs" at Parliament House. She objected to any policy which brought Aboriginal people into missions or allowed them to gather near towns. She instead advocated for her own appointment as a Protector of Aborigines, a salary of £200 a year and that she be equipped with a camel buggy. With this, she said that she would travel the region, find camps of Aboriginal people and act as "an intermediary between them to help settle their quarrels and help protect them from their own people and the whites."

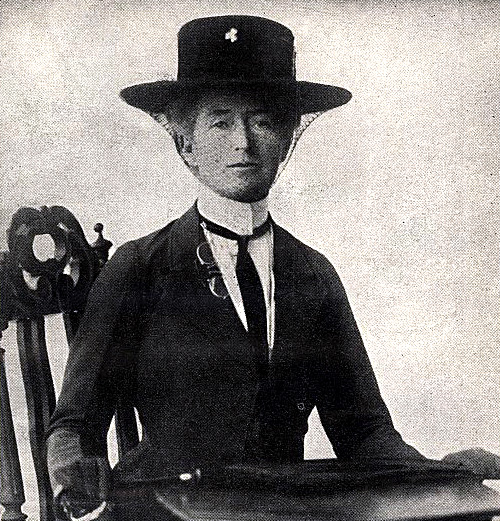
Bates in 1914, before attending the congress in Melbourne

The congress of the British Association for the Advancement of Science opened in Adelaide on 3 August. Bates attended the congress over the coming weeks in Adelaide, Melbourne and Sydney. On the third day of the congress it was announced that the United Kingdom, and by extension Australia, had joined World War I. At the congress in Sydney she met the future anthropologist Olive Pink, who she would correspond with. Bates's son Arnold was living in Sydney and was about to join the war. While there Bates saw him for the second-to-last time; it was also the only time she ever met her daughter-in-law and grandson.

At the congress, Brown presented a paper titled Varieties of Totemism in Australia. Bates said Brown presented a paper titled The Myths and Legends of the Western Australian Aborigines and that after his presentation she was invited to comment; she complimented him on presenting her work so well that she had nothing to add. Only Bates's account of this event exist. While Brown is known to have plagiarised others on multiple occasions, whether or not he plagiarised Bates is uncertain. Anthropologists Isobel White and Rodney Needham agreed, in the very least, that he did not give her due credit for her work.

In September, Bates returned to Adelaide from Sydney. In November or later she returned to Yalata Station at Fowlers Bay. There she received the news that her application for the position of a Protector had been rejected. Largely due to the war reducing the market for her articles, there is little information regarding Bates for the next four years, though it is known that she continued her ethnographic work.

In early 1918, Bates had written to William Hurst, the editor of The Argus and The Australasian, with a new article of hers. This led to a long professional relationship, where Hurst published all but one of the dozens of articles Bates sent to him until he retired in 1937. (Note: Within a few years of correspondence, Bates began expressing "something like love" for Hurst. How Hurst felt for Bates is not known as only a few of his letters survived. They only met twice.) In August, Bates wrote to the Australian Army, wanting to know the whereabouts of her son, Arnold, whom she had not heard from since early that year. She was told his whereabouts and "no doubt wrote to him" but she continued to not receive word. In September she wrote to the Chief Protector William South, asking for assistance due to her poor health and dire financial circumstances. By October Bates had experienced two breakdowns, both were physical and mental.

In early 1919 Bates received word from William South, who sent her £50 and gave her the position of a matron at a home for wounded soldiers in Myrtle Bank, South Australia. After resting for a couple weeks near Adelaide, she assumed the position. In early May, after about two months, she resigned because the physical demands of the job were too great for her.

==== Time at Ooldea: 1919 to 1935 ====
Ooldea, a small settlement and railway depot along the Trans-Australian Railway, had a number of Aboriginal people migrating there due to its permanent water soak and the drought that had stricken the region to the north. Concerned that contact between the settlers and Aboriginal people would harm the latter (particularly women and girls), Bates advocated that Aboriginal people be prohibited from nearing the railway by 2–4 miles (3.2–6.4 km). The Women's Non-Party Political Association supported her; they advocated for her appointment as a Justice of the Peace, be employed as a Protector, and that she be given a rail pass to freely patrol the line. They wrote newspaper articles and to government officials, they also organised public meetings but none of their requests were granted. On 25 September 1919, Bates left for Ooldea by train.

At Ooldea, Bates provided rudimentary medical aid to sick or injured Aboriginal people by preparing food and applying salves and bandages. Much of her time was spent doing this; Bob Reece said she "underwent a subtle transition from a woman of science ... to someone more like a welfare worker." The anthropological research she conducted there was primarily focused on material culture and secondarily on linguistics. She collected a wide range of culturally significant items and documented details regarding their utility, origin and production. She sent many of these to dealers, collectors and museums; she refused to accept money for them. Of the investigative research that she did conduct, much of it was gathered after providing rudimentary medical aid to sick or injured Aboriginal people. Some of the Pitjantjatjara in Ooldea and the surrounding area referred to Bates by the courtesy name Kabbarli, meaning "grandmother". Others referred to her as mamu, meaning ghost or devil, and as "that poor old lady at Ooldea".

Bates's time at Ooldea taxed her mental and physical health: While there, she had two breakdowns, both likely due to depression; developed dysentery and had to be cared for by Ms Bolam, the station master's wife; and had a finger "poisoned" after burying an Aboriginal man who had died of syphilis. She also was blinded for three weeks due to conjunctivitis in November 1920. Though she consulted an eye specialist during her last visit to Perth in May 1921, her eyesight troubled her for years to come.

In July, the future Edward VIII, then the Prince of Wales, visited Cook Siding, four train stops west of Ooldea, to watch a series of dances by various Aboriginal peoples, as well as displays of boomerang and spear throwing. Bates had been asked by the federal government to organise this event. As they watched, Bates explained the significance of the dances to the prince. According to historian Bob Reece, Bates considered the Prince's visit one of the highest points of her time at Ooldea and, according to Susanna de Vries, it was one of the high points of her life.

In June, Bates published an article where she criticised the government's recent creation of a 456,000 km^{2} (176,000 sq mi) Aboriginal reserve and advocated for a "woman patrol" to prevent the movement of Aboriginal people into non-Aboriginal settlements. In the article, she also claimed that various Aboriginal peoples were cannibals, including one group which she said "kill for the delight of drinking the blood of their victims". Aboriginal civil-rights leader William Harris wrote an article in response and said bi-racial Aboriginal people could be of value to Australian society. Bates replied, "as to the half-castes, however early they may be taken and trained, with very few exceptions, the only good half-caste is a dead one." That August, Bates published her first article focussed on cannibalism.

Sometime in 1926, Bates's first of many articles in The Children's Newspaper was published. The owner, Arthur Mee, would be a great source of financial and moral support for years to come. In June or May, Olive Pink visited Bates at Ooldea for five days. During this time, Bates taught her the basics of her ethnography. Her visit inspired Pink to follow Bates in pursuing a life of ethnographic research in a remote community. Bates described Pink's visit as "a delight".

In June 1932, the journalist and author Ernestine Hill visited Bates at Ooldea for five days to interview her. Hill's article was widely syndicated, providing Bates with much publicity. (Note: The article's focus was Bates's camplife, her work, Bates being unaware of developments in popular culture (such as jazz), and a spurious tale of Bates being Irish nobility.) Hill published a second article on Bates two weeks after the first. Bates and Hill regularly corresponded after the visit and became close friends.

In late July, Bates's son Arnold visited her at Ooldea. She refused to let him inside her campsite as it was off-limits to men and she claimed that the local Aboriginal people "would not believe he was her son." He instead slept outside of her campsite. This annoyed Arnold and he left early next morning. This was the last time she had contact with her son.

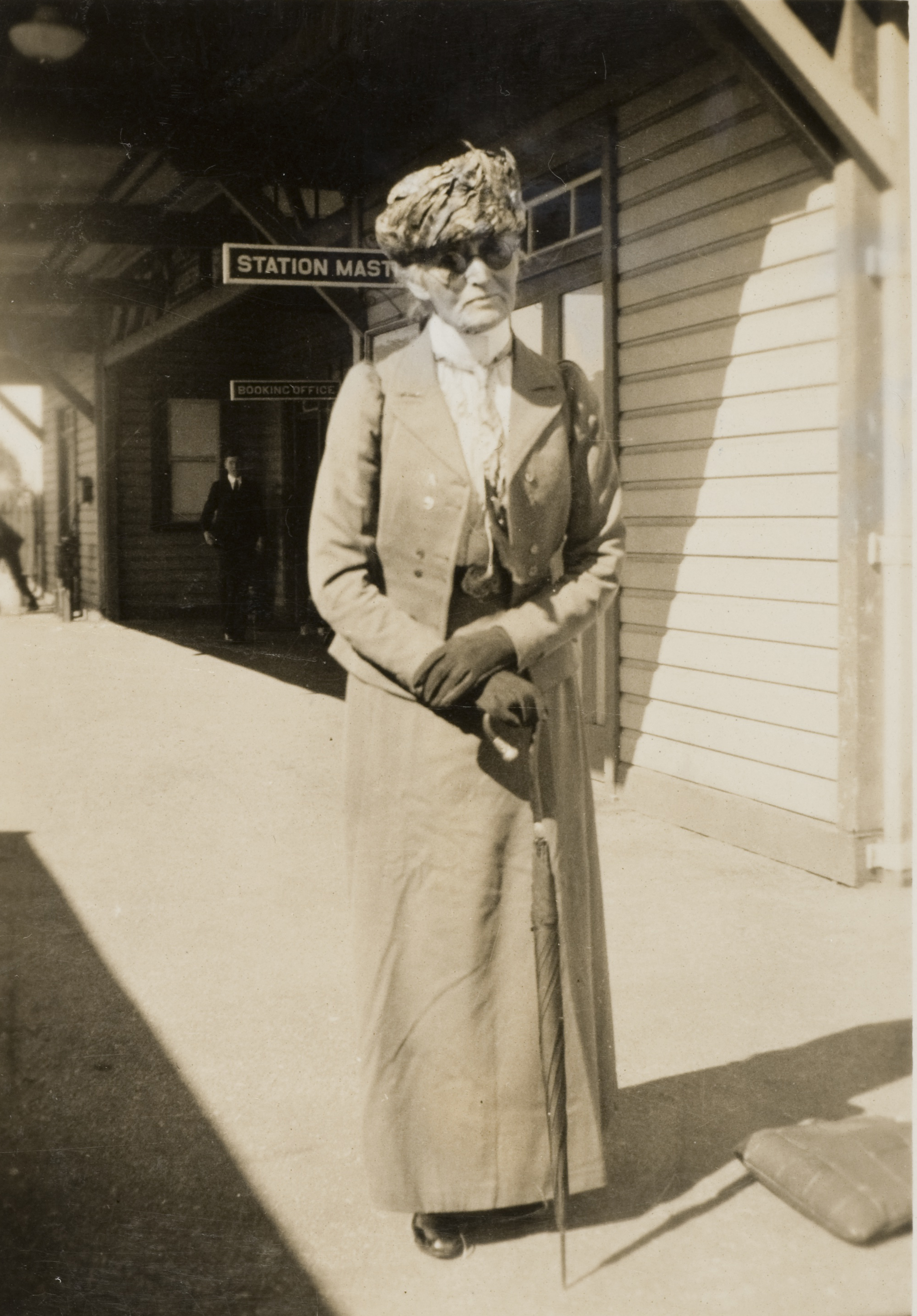
Bates at Canberra railway station, 1933.

From 1932 to 1933, in what would be referred to as the Caledon Bay crisis, five fishermen and a policeman were killed by a group of Yolgnu men. This received much national and international publicity and, in August 1933, Bates was invited to Canberra to give advice. She advised that Aboriginal peoples ought to be left alone so that they could live peacefully before their inevitable extinction; she also offered to personally intervene in conflicts involving any of the Aboriginal peoples in northern Australia. She returned to Ooldea after three weeks, on 23 September.

At Ooldea, Bates found that the missionary Annie Lock had begun erecting buildings for a mission. Supported by the South Australian Government and the United Aborigines Mission, Lock was given rations to distribute to Aboriginal people. Dental and medical care were provided, and a school was opened. Bates, feeling that her campsite had been "jumped", was brought to tears.

On 7 May 1935, with the encouragement of Hill, and likely spurred by the death of her estranged husband Jack in April, Bates left Ooldea for Adelaide.

==== Fame and final years: 1935 to 1951 ====
Bates's whereabouts from 1935 to 1951

An advance of £500, accommodation at the South Australian Hotel and a shared office with Ernestine Hill at The Advertiser were granted to Bates for producing a series of autobiographical articles. Due to her near blindness, failing short-term memory, and growing difficulty in telling a cohesive story, Bates dictated while Hill transcribed. The latter then edited what became a series of 21 articles titled "My Natives and I". The first article was published on 4 January 1936 and the series was widely syndicated. Hill received no formal acknowledgement for her involvement. Though initially this had been at her own request, she changed her mind in April but Bates never publicly acknowledged her contributions.

In April 1936, the federal government hired Edith Watts, a typist, to prepare Bates's large collection of notes for donation to the National Library of Australia. Bates was also provided an allowance of £2 a week and an office.

"My Natives and I" began being edited into a book by Hill and a writer named Max Lamshed. The editing process distressed Bates and her financial situation quickly deteriorated due to her rapid spending. In January 1937, she set up camp in Pyap (190 kilometres (120 mi) from Adelaide) and became very involved in the local school. Her poor financial situation was exacerbated because the new owners of Hurst's newspapers no longer accepted her articles.

The manuscript was sent to London at the end of 1937 to be edited. The finished book, titled The Passing of the Aborigines, was published in November 1938. Bates's eyesight had worsened: she couldn't read her book until she had surgery in January 1939. The book gave her an international reputation as an expert on the Aboriginal peoples of Australia, lent considerable authority to the belief that Aboriginal people would go extinct, and became a staple text in Australian school curriculums during the 1940s and 1950s.

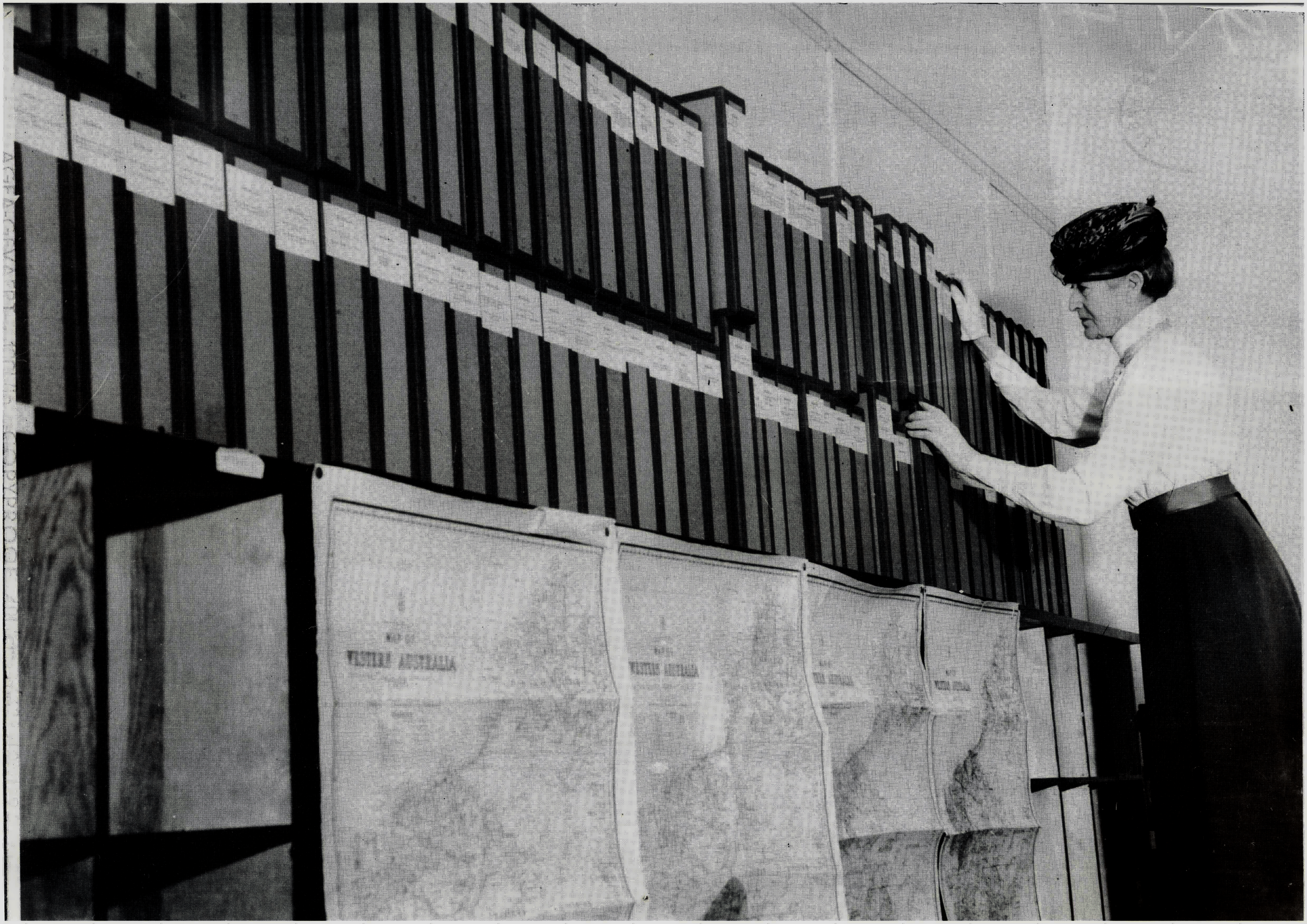
Bates and her 99 folders of records before being submitted to the National Library of Australia, 1941.

Watts continued preparing Bates's notes for donation while Bates remained at Pyap. The collection was deposited in February 1941, whereby her allowance, which had increased to £5 5s, came to an end. She was interviewed by the ABC on radio that same month, she abhorred the technology, felt that she had no sense of control and became paranoid. When she returned to Pyap, she burned most of the letters that she had ever received, as well as the diaries she had kept since 1899.

In April 1941, Bates returned to her tent life at Wynbring Siding (a station 170 kilometres (110 mi) east of Ooldea), wishing to continue her work with Aboriginal people. She began writing paranoid letters to the government. After she sent one that expressed concern for her safety, a government official investigated but found her concerns to be unfounded, concluding that "She is just a little bit mental I think". In January 1945, growing concerns for her health resulted in two police-officers forcefully bringing her to Port Augusta for care.

In March, she was transferred to Adelaide for care. She ran away in November, briefly roaming before paying for accommodation in Streaky Bay. Hill visited Bates for two weeks. When Hill left, Bates gave her an unedited collection of stories from Aboriginal religions and mythologies for her to edit into a children's book. Hill did not but in 1972 it was published by novelist Ker Wilson under the title Tales told to Kabbarli: Aboriginal legends collected by Daisy Bates, with illustrations by Harold Thomas.

In mid-1948, Bates moved to Beatrice Raine's house in Adelaide, where she stayed for over a year. While there she tried to contact her son, Arnold, through the Returned and Services League of Australia, but she continued to receive no word from him.

Her last 18 months were spent at a nursing home in Adelaide. On 18 April 1951, aged 91, Bates died in her sleep. She was buried at Adelaide's North Road Cemetery on 20 April. Her grandson, Ronald, was the only member of her family to attend. Her will, written in 1941, contained the wish that her estate and all future royalties be used to aid Aboriginal people who were living in "the district of Ooldea and in Western Australia". The University of Adelaide was her executor.

== Involvement with Australian Aboriginal peoples ==
Bates was influenced by the pseudoscience of Social Darwinism and believed that Aboriginal Australians were primitive and "physically uncivilizable". She consequently believed, as did many others in her time, that Aboriginal Australians were a "dying race". Therefore, her mission was to "smooth the dying pillow" and to record as much as she could before they disappeared. Bates devoted 40 years of her life to studying Aboriginal peoples' cultures. Evaluations of the work she conducted over this time have varied greatly.

Many contemporaries were highly critical of her. Two activists for Aboriginal civil rights, William Harris and Mary Bennett, considered her to be one of the worst enemies of the Aboriginal peoples and that she exploited them for her own gain. The medical practitioner and geologist Herbert Basedow – who had led an expedition through the north-west of South Australia and inspected the health of Aboriginal people at Ooldea in 1920 – was critical of her claims of cannibalism, suggesting that she was "wildly exaggerating".

The international success of her book The Passing of the Aborigines granted her the popular reputation as an expert on the Aboriginal peoples of Australia. However, the book was severely criticised by several academics. Anthropologist Ted Strehlow wrote in 1968 that it was "riddled with inaccuracies" and marred by baseless tales about cannibalism. The anatomist and anthropologist Andrew Abbie wrote in 1969 that because of Bates's claims of cannibalism, he "strongly suspected Mrs. Bates was equally in error in [other] fields". The anthropologists Ronald and Catherine Berndt, who conducted fieldwork at Ooldea in 1941, wrote in 1977 that Bates's "notes are the only ones available for some groups of Aboriginals" but that much of her work was not "seriously anthropological" and left much to be desired.

Bates's posthumously published book The Native Tribes of Western Australia was the product of nearly a decade of research conducted by her throughout the south-west of Australia. Anthropologist Isobel White edited the book, allowing it to be finally published in 1985. White suggested that the book would "remain [Bates's] greatest contribution to our knowledge of Aboriginal life-styles before these were changed by contact with Europeans". She explained that Bates's success was due to her living with the people she studied and by "sitting on the ground and sharing her food with them, observing their behaviour and listening". This research method would not be common in anthropology for many years. White noted that Bates's personal attitudes "coloured" her interpretations; she described Bates's contradictory views on the role of women in Aboriginal societies as evidence. She wrote that Bates's research compares well to her contemporaries' and where it failed later anthropological standards, this was due to her sharing the beliefs and values of her generation. White concluded that, though Bates had severe faults and though her later work at Ooldea lacked the quality of her earlier work, her "reputation as an anthropologist and an authority on the Aborigines of Western Australia" is "well deserved".

Historian Bob Reece judges that, "with the notable exception of cannibalism, ... she was scrupulous in her empirical research" about Aboriginal societies. Linguist William McGregor submits that Bates's "documentations of Aboriginal languages were reliable records of what she was told, within the parameters of transcriptional accuracy that could be expected of an amateur investigator of her time." However, he disagrees with Reece on the reliability of "her general observations on Australian languages and cultures", arguing that Bates sometimes lied about her methodology in order to make a good story, present herself as outstanding and to establish herself as sole authority on Aboriginal people.

Anthropologist Edward McDonald and heritage consultant Bryn Coldrick write that Bates "approached her ethnographic work in a 'professional' manner, though no doubt changes in her work practices as she aged need to be accounted for." They compare her ethnography favourably with her contemporaries, describing how she tested the reliability of the data she collected and pioneered several research techniques. They conclude "that in some respects Bates was ahead of her time", though she ultimately "remained a pre-modern Edwardian anthropologist".

=== Digital database ===
The goal of the Digital Daisy Bates project, co-ordinated by Nicholas Thieberger, was the digitisation, transcription and geocoding of the word lists compiled by Bates in the 1900s. The geocoding allows the origin of the words and wordlists to be presented on a map.

== Bates's fictitious and misleading claims ==
Daisy Bates made several false statements about her personal and professional history. This has contributed to scholars questioning the reliability of her anthropological work.

She described her family as landowning Irish Anglican aristocracy, when in fact her parents were Catholics and "lived in modest circumstances above the family bootery" which they rented. In defence of Bates, Reece states that "as a poor Irish Catholic immigrant girl seeking to make her way in colonial Australia, she had every reason to reinvent her early life". De Vries similarly concludes that, because "anti-Catholic and anti-Irish prejudice was rife in North Queensland", she falsified her family background to "be treated with respect".

From around 1912, Bates described Jack Bates, her separated husband and father of her child, as "my late husband", when he actually died more than 20 years later (in 1935 in Mullewa, Western Australia, near Geraldton).

Bates wrote in 1936 that shortly before returning to Australia in 1899, The Times had accepted an offer of hers to investigate claims of cruel treatment of Aboriginal people in the north of Western Australia. She said she began this investigation shortly after arriving in Perth and that her findings had been published by The Times. Recent biographers express varied levels of scepticism towards Bates's account. Reece and Hogan question the likelihood of a formal commission, with Hogan noting that "No record of a formal assignment from the Times exists". According to De Vries, Bates's claim of being a freelance correspondent for The Times "was untrue" as the newspaper had "merely agreed to publish a letter to the editor if she sent one". Her first known publication in The Times is from 1904 – a letter sent in response to charges of mistreatment of Aboriginal people made by Walter Malcolmson in the same year.

Bates also made many "sensational" claims regarding cannibalism among Aboriginal people without convincing evidence. While some Aboriginal peoples practised cannibalism (much of which was done as part of mortuary rituals and involved only parts of the body being eaten), Bates developed what has been described as a "fixation" and as a "morbid preoccupation" with the topic later on in her life. De Vries notes that "This became worse in her seventies and eighties as her dementia increased." Over forty references to cannibalism can be found in her contributions to tabloid newspapers. Eleanor Hogan says that "it wasn't until she began camping at Ooldea that she persistently advocated this practice was rife across the country." While confirming that cases of cannibalism after infanticide occurred in some Aboriginal groups, anthropologists Ronald Berndt and Catherine Berndt rejected Bates's claims regarding its prevalence as "grossly exaggerated". Reece thinks that she spread misleading tales of widespread cannibalism because such stories sold well and journalism was her chief means of financial support.

In 1920, Bates claimed that Nyan-ngauera, a pregnant Aboriginal woman, "had given birth then killed and shared the baby with her surviving child." To support her story, she sent a box of bones to the South Australian Museum but the bones were identified as those of a cat. Years later she sent another box of charred bones to the Australian naturalist John Burton Cleland, again describing them as evidence of cannibalism. While Cleland identified them to be human, he kept this secret because he feared it could be used to reduce Aboriginal welfare payments and he remained sceptical of her claims.

== Personality and views ==
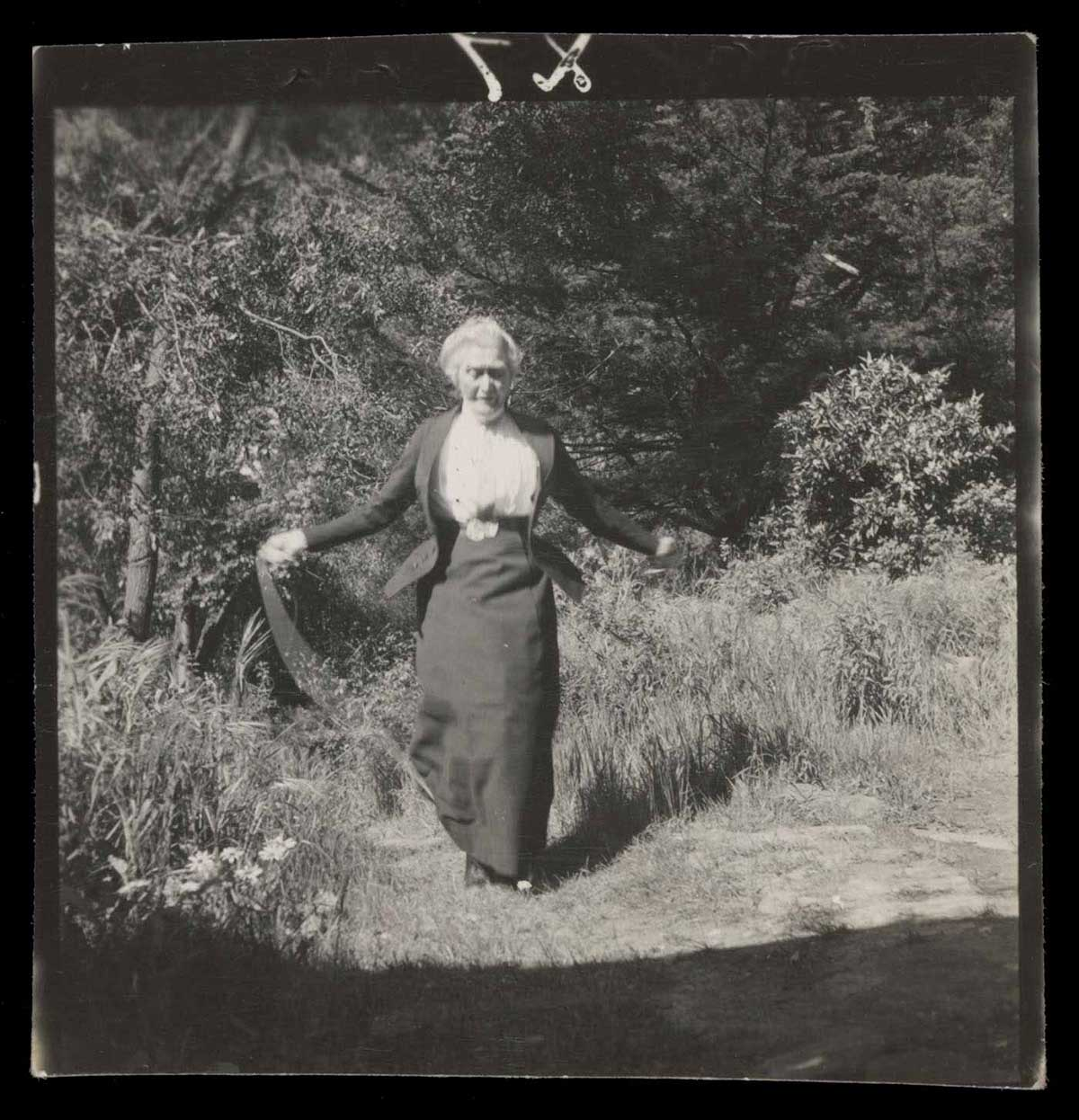
Bates, then 89–90 years old, jumping rope in Beatrice Raine's garden, 1949.

Bates was known for her strict lifelong adherence to Edwardian fashion, which included wearing a coat, corset, ankle length skirt, boots, gloves and a veil. She remained physically fit into her late eighties and maintained a morning skipping-rope routine until then. In earlier years she did calisthenic exercises and used dumb-bells. She carried a .32 revolver during her time in the outback and was a good enough shot to hunt game, which included rabbits. Bates said that in her younger years she liked to "Just meet, love, then part—perhaps never see each other again. It was fun that way." She swore off ever having sex again after the birth of her son, Arnold.

She was a non-denominational Christian and great admirer of Charles Dickens. She supported the British Empire and monarchy, and was a critic of trade unions. Many of her contemporaries found her personality to be autocratic; her secretary believed that her difficulty working with others was why she spent so much time in the desert.

== Recognition and memberships ==
In 1907, Bates was elected a member of the Victorian branch of Royal Geographical Society and appointed an honorary corresponding member of the Royal Anthropological Institute of Great Britain and Ireland. In May 1934, she became a Commander of the Most Excellent Order of the British Empire (CBE).

== In popular culture ==
- Marjorie Gwynne's 1941 painting of Bates shows her sitting at a desk sorting through correspondence. The portrait now hangs in the Art Gallery of South Australia.
- Sidney Nolan's 1950 painting Daisy Bates at Ooldea shows Bates standing in a barren outback landscape. It was acquired by the National Gallery of Australia.
- An episode in her life was the basis for Margaret Sutherland's chamber opera The Young Kabbarli (1964).
- Choreographer Margaret Barr represented Bates in two dance dramas, Colonial portraits (1957) and Portrait of a Lady with the CBE (1971).
- In 1972, ABC TV screened Daisy Bates, a series of four 30-minute episodes with art by Guy Grey-Smith; the music was composed by Diana Blom and sung by Lauris Elms.
- Her involvement with Aboriginal people is the basis for the 1983 lithograph The Ghost of Kabbarli by Susan Dorothea White.
- In 2002, a dramatised documentary about Bates was produced.
- In 2007, Tales of Kabbarli, a one-woman play with Daisy Bates as the sole character, was first performed. Since opening and at least until 2024, Bates has been played by Robina Beard. It is set in 1939 at Bates's camp in Pyap, Victoria.

== Sources ==
- "A Woman's Melbourne Letter". Western Mail. Vol. XXIX, no. 1, 499. Western Australia. 18 September 1914 – via National Library of Australia.
- Anderson, Don (29 April 1972). "Daisy Bates, superstar". The Bulletin. 94 (4802).
- Antonia, Alexis; Craig, Hugh; Hogan, Eleanor (8 February 2019). "More than an Amanuensis: Ernestine Hill's Contribution to The Passing of the Aborigines". Journal of the Association for the Study of Australian Literature. 18 (3).
- "AusStage". www.ausstage.edu.au.
- Barrington, Robin (December 2015). "Unravelling the Yamaji imaginings of Alexander Morton and Daisy Bates". Aboriginal History. 39. doi:10.22459/AH.39.2015. ISSN 1837-9389.
- Bates, Daisy M. (July 1901a). "Possibilities of Tropical Agriculture in Nor' west". Western Australia Department of Agriculture. 4. Perth: Paragon Printing Works: 6–13.
- Bates, Daisy M. (September 1901b). "From Port Hedland to Carnarvon by Buggy". Western Australian Department of Agriculture. 4. Perth: Paragon Printing Works.
- Bates, Daisy M. (24 May 1904). "The People of Australia and the Aborigines". The Times. London.
- Bates, Daisy M. (May 1907). "The West Australian Aborigines: Their Marriage Laws and Some Peculiar Customs". Glasgow Med J. 67 (5): 357–373. PMC 5957749. PMID 30437640.
- Bates, Daisy M. (12 June 1921). "New Aboriginal Reserve". Sunday Times. Perth: via National Library of Australia. p. 8.
- Bates, Daisy M. (23 January 1936). "My Natives and I: Chapter 2". Western Mail. p. 14. "Just before I left London, a letter had been published in 'The Times', containing very strong allegations of cruelty to West Australian aborigines by the white settlers of the North-West. I called upon 'The Times', stated that I was going to Western Australia, and would be happy to occupy myself, on arrival, with close and full investigation of the charges, and would write them the results. 'The Times' courteously accepted my free lance offer ... 'The Times' published the result of my investigations, and the matter dropped for a decade."
- Bates, Daisy; Bridge, P. J. (2004). My natives and I: incorporating The passing of the Aborigines: a lifetime spent among the natives of Australia. Carlisle, W.A: Hesperian Press. ISBN 085905313X.
- Bates, Daisy M.; White, Isobel (1985). The Native Tribes of Western Australia. Canberra: National Library of Australia. ISBN 0-642-99333-5.
- Blackburn, Julia (1995). Daisy Bates in the Desert: A Woman's Life Among the Aborigines. Knopf Doubleday Publishing Group. ISBN 0-679-42001-0.
- de Vries, Susanna (2008). Desert Queen: The Many Lives and Loves of Daisy Bates. Harper Collins Publishers. ISBN 978-0-7322-8243-1.
- Egan, Ted (1996). Justice All Their Own: The Caledon Bay and Woodah Island Killings, 1932–1933. Melbourne University Press.
- Hogan, Eleanor (2021). Into the Loneliness: The Unholy Alliance of Ernestine Hill and Daisy Bates. Sydney, N.S.W: NewSouth. ISBN 978-1-74224-505-8.
- Horton, David (1994). The Encyclopaedia of Aboriginal Australia: Aboriginal and Torres Strait Islander History, Society and Culture. Vol. 1. Canberra: Aboriginal Studies Press, Australian Institute of Aboriginal and Torres Strait Islander Studies. ISBN 0-85575-249-1.
- Huntley, Rebecca (26 August 2023). "The Sands of Ooldea, Part 2: Kabbarli". The History Listen (Podcast). ABC.
- Land, Clare (16 January 2018) [9 February 2001]. "Bates, Daisy May". The Australian Women's Register.
- Lomas, Brian (29 October 2015). Queen of Deception (1 ed.). Createspace Independent Publishing Platform. ISBN 978-1-5170-5385-7.
- Lyndall, Ryan; Debenham, Jennifer; Pascoe, Bill; Robyn, Smith; Owen, Chris; Richards, Jonathan; Gilbert, Stephanie; Anders, Robert J; Usher, Kaine; Price, Daniel; Newley, Jack; Mark, Brown; Hugh, Craig (2024). "Laverton (2)". Colonial Frontier Massacres in Australia 1788–1930. Newcastle: University of Newcastle.
- McDonald, Edward; Coldrick, Bryn (2022). "'Out Amongst the Natives': Fieldwork and the Legacy of Daisy Bates, a Controversial Ethnographer in Australia". Bérose - Encyclopédie internationale des histoires de l'anthropologie. Paris. ISSN 2648-2770.
- McGregor, William (November 2012). "Daisy Bates' Documentations of Kimberley Languages". Language and History. 55 (2). Aarhus University: 79–101. doi:10.1179/1759753612Z.0000000007.
- Monaghan, Paul (2010). "Daisy Bates, Grand Dame of the Desert Book review of: Daisy Bates, Grand Dame of the Desert by Bob Reece". Aboriginal History. 34: 239–241.
- "Mrs. Daisy M. Bates, F.R.A.S." Western Mail. Vol. XXIII, no. 1, 158. Western Australia. 7 March 1908. p. 15 – via National Library of Australia.
- Needham, Rodney (1974). Remarks and Inventions – Skeptical Essays about Kinship. New York: Tavistock. ISBN 0-422-74360-7.
- Owen, Chris (1 June 2008). "Publish and be damned!" (PDF). Native Title Conference. AIATSIS.
- Pask, Edward (1982). Ballet in Australia: The Second Act, 1940–1980. OUP. ISBN 978-0-19-554294-3.
- Reece, Bob (2007a). Daisy Bates: Grand Dame of the Desert. Canberra, A.C.T: National Library of Australia. ISBN 978-0-642-27654-4.
- Reece, Bob (2007b). "'You would have loved her for her lore': the letters of Daisy Bates". Australian Aboriginal Studies (1): 51–70. ISSN 0729-4352 – via The Free Library.
- "Remembered by a painting she liked". The Advertiser. 31 July 1952.
- R.R. (12 September 1964). "Program of Four Ballets". The Sydney Morning Herald. Sydney, New South Wales – via Newspapers.com. (subscription required)
- Salter, Elizabeth (1971). Daisy Bates. New York: Coward, McCann & Geoghegan, inc. LCCN 73175277.
- Stingemore, Jade (April 2010). Surviving the "Cure": Life on Bernier and Dorre Islands under the Lock Hospital Regime (Doctoral Thesis thesis). University of Western Australia Centre for Forensic Science. OCLC 903835771.
- "Tales of Kabbarli". PLAYSCRIPT.
- Thieberger, Nick (2017). "Map". Digital Daisy Bates.
- Thieberger, Nick (2017). "Technical details". Digital Daisy Bates.
- Thieberger, Nick (2017). "The Questionnaire". Digital Daisy Bates.
- West, Joe; Roper, Roger (2016). Breaker Morant: The Final Roundup. Stroud, Gloucestershire: Amberley Publishing. ISBN 978-1-44-565965-7. OCLC 976033815.
- White, Isobel (March 1981). "Mrs Bates and Mr Brown: An examination of Rodney Needham's allegations". Oceania. 51 (3): 193–210. doi:10.1002/j.1834-4461.1981.tb01449.x.
- White, Isobel (1993). "Daisy Bates: Legend and Reality". In Marcus, Julie (ed.). First in their Field: Women and Australian Anthropology. Melbourne: Melbourne University Press. pp. 47–65.
