= Georgina King =

Australian geologist and anthropologist (1845–1932)

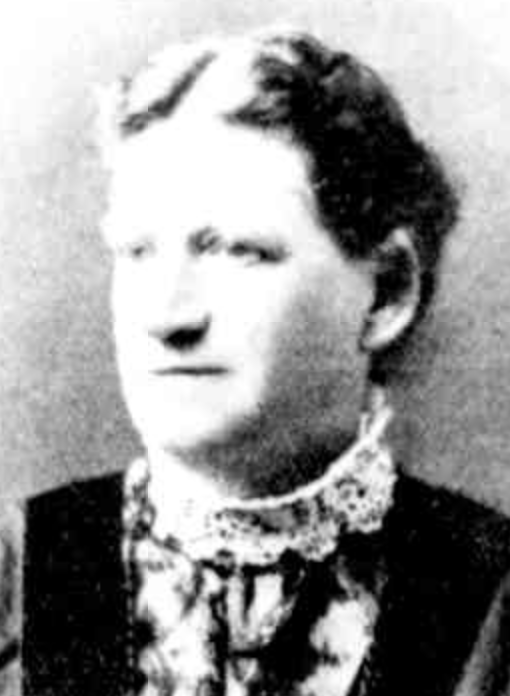
Georgina King

Georgina King (1845-1932), was an Australian geologist and anthropologist.

== Early life ==
Georgina King was born on 6 June 1845 in Fremantle, Western Australia, to George King, a Church of England clergyman from Ireland, and his wife Jane Mathewson. She is their second daughter, and her brother Kelso King would also bring acclaim to the family. In 1849, her family moved to Sydney. King's father, a fellow of St Paul's College, oversaw her education and encouraged her to read widely including books on evolution and natural history. It is in Sydney where she developed her interest in fossils, first introduced to her by a clergyman and amateur geologist named William Branwhite Clarkson. Later on, her family doctor, George Bennett, a keen naturalist, recommended texts on geology for her to read. So, like many of the young women during the 19th century, she was educated from home. Discouraged by her father and Bennett from marrying, King looked after a nephew and niece at Springwood from the 1870s until 1881, and then travelled to Britain and Europe. She experienced a significant amount of hardship in her years working geology. Often like she was being taken advantage of or not being taken seriously enough in an industry dominated by males. Eventually she wrote two autobiographies before her death in 1932.

== Scientific studies ==
After returning to Australia, King was active in the Women's Literary Society, which was founded in 1889, along with friend Rose Scott. King was an original member of the Women's Club. In 1888, King attended the inaugural meeting of the Australasian Association for the Advancement of Science (AAAS). She met many distinguished scientists through this meeting and later corresponded with R. L. Jack, who had done extensive geological surveys of Queensland and (Sir) Frederick McCoy of Victoria. Recalling the geological history she had been taught in her youth, and inspired by the work of McCoy and others, King proposed a 'Tertiary Period Catastrophism' theory to the wider scientific community. When her paper on this theory was rejected by the Royal Society of New South Wales in 1892, King sent them to be published in newspapers like the Sydney Morning Herald. Similarly she sent her papers to the University of Sydney and other scientists to consider. Her controversial ideas and claims to theories posed by other scientists, led to further ridicule.

Her theory of "Tertiary Period Catastrophism" described mineral deposits and all geological structures as having been created by forces of heat, magnetism, and electricity which had been produced through "volcanic action". King believed that other scientists were trying to steal her ideas. She Believed that Edgeworth David and E. F. Pittman wished to claim her theory as their own when it was rejected in 1892 by the Society of New South Wales. She also thought that Einstein had stolen ideas of relativity she had created. Kings eventually reached out to T. H. Huxley in order to get a response to her theories, one of these theories being that diamonds were once marine organisms.

King collected botanical specimens (at least 295) for Ferdinand von Mueller, from the Blue Mountains (1892-1893, 1895, 1897), Port Jackson (1893-1896), and various other parts of New South Wales and Queensland. She collected the type specimen of Pultenaea subternata. She traveled to study rock formations in Ireland, England, and other parts of Europe in the early 1880s.

King published papers on anthropological subjects after 1900. She used some of her father's work on Aboriginal people to expand her ideas, and continued to elaborate on her geological theory of evolution. She was elected a fellow of the Royal Anthropological Society of Australasia, and published within its journal, Science of Man. From 1913 King corresponded with and financially supported, Daisy Bates, another woman who felt frustrated by the scientific establishment.

King volunteered with the Red Cross during World War I. She made dolls for patients of the Royal Alexandra Hospital for Children and was a prolific letter writer to the daily newspapers.

King died on 7 June 1932 at Darling Point, Sydney, and was cremated.

== Legacy ==
King donated many specimens of natural science to the Australian Museum and Technological Museum of Sydney. She also donated over 300 specimens to the National Herbarium of Victoria. Her papers are held by the State Library of New South Wales.

King was an author of numerous pamphlets including, "The Mineral Wealth of New South Wales", "The Discovery of Gold and How It Was Found", "Two Stone Ages, Australia", and "The Antiquities of the Australian Aborigines" these appearing in the Sydney Morning Herald. Nearly 300 of King's specimens are currently located at The National Herbarium of Victoria.
