= Royal Anthropological Society of Australasia =

Former society based in Sydney, Australia (1895-c.1913)

The Royal Anthropological Society of Australasia, originally the Anthropological Society of Australasia, was a society focused on anthropology that existed from 1895 until around 1913.

== History ==
The Anthropological Society of Australasia was established in 1895 by the Australian physician Alan Carroll. Viscount Hampden, Governor-General of New South Wales, was the first patron.

Approval was given for the prefix "Royal" to be added by Queen Victoria in 1900.

After Carroll died in 1911, records of the society dry up, although its journal continued until 1913.

== Activities ==
One of the activities of the society was to record and publish Aboriginal place names in New South Wales.

The society published 14 volumes of its journal Science of Man between February 1898 and November 1913. Alan Carroll edited the journal until his death in 1911.

== Modern assessment ==
According to a 2003 article by academic Jennifer M. T. Carter published by the National Library of Australia when writing about geologist Georgina King, the society was "nowadays [2003] seen as forming part of the 'lunatic fringe'".

== See also ==
- Anthropological Society of South Australia
