= Fanny Balbuk =

Aboriginal land rights activist in Western Australia

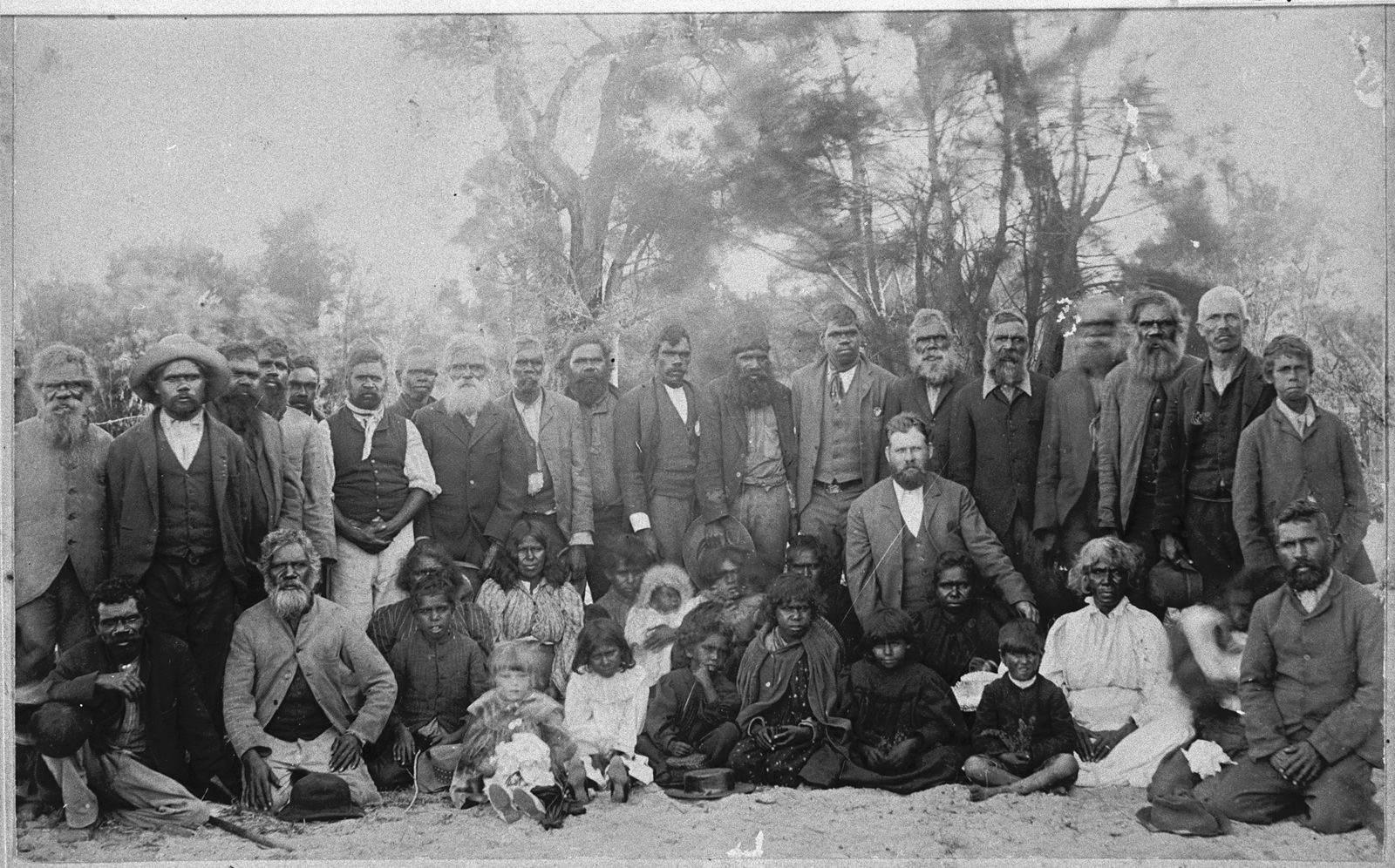
Group portrait of Noongar women and children; Fanny Balbuk seated on the right in the white dress

Fanny Balbuk (1840–1907), also known as Yooreel, was a prominent Whadjuk woman who lived in Perth, Western Australia during the early years of the Swan River Colony. She is remembered for her commitment to Aboriginal land rights, and for her hostile reactions to the buildings, fences, and homes erected as Perth increased in size and encroached on land that she still considered belonged to her people.

Map showing Noongar language areas

== Early life ==
Balbuk, who was sometimes recorded as Yooreel, was born on Matagarup (Heirisson Island) in the Swan River, near the causeway on Whadjuk country in 1840. Her father, Coondenung, was an accomplished hunter and her mother, Joojeebal (Doodyep), was known for her "cheeky" sense of humour. Balbuk was a descendant of Yellagonga, and her traditional land covers the area that has become the Perth central business district area. She would collect gilgies and vegetables from the swampy areas around what is now central Perth.

== Reaction to colonisation ==
Balbuk was well known among the British colonists who had grown up around her. At a young age she had travelled to places such as Northam, Moore River and Dandaragan, and she attended a friendship ceremony where she was given the name Yooreel at Moore River. She is remembered for her commitment to maintaining her people's land rights in Perth's Swan River Colony. Balbuk would walk the track between her birth site and the railway station, regardless of any new buildings or fences erected in her path as the colony grew. Daisy Bates wrote "one of her favourite annoyances was to stand at the gates of Government House, reviling all who dwelt within, in that the stone gates guarded by a sentry enclosed her grandmother's burial ground".

Noongar elder Noel Nannup tells a similar story: "That was her songline, her dreaming. She just kept going and didn’t take any notice of the new city going up. That’s a story of defiance and determination".

== Death ==
Balbuk died of heart failure at the Colonial Hospital, Perth on 20 March 1907.

== Legacy ==
She is remembered for her commitment to Aboriginal land rights, and for her hostile reactions to British colonialism as it impacted the traditional Noongar culture.

Balbuk passed on information to Bates about traditional Nyoongar lands around Perth, which proved significant in the 2006 native title claim, when the Federal Court of Australia found that Nyoongar people held Native Title rights over the Perth area. The decision was later overturned by the full Federal Court.
