= Daisy Bates at Ooldea =

1950 painting by Sidney Nolan

- Artist: Sidney Nolan
- Year: 1950
- Type: enamel and oil on composition board
- Dimensions: 90.3 cm × 119.3 cm (35.6 in × 47.0 in)
- Location: National Gallery of Australia; Canberra

Daisy Bates at Ooldea is a painting by Australian artist Sidney Nolan, completed in Sydney in 1950 after Nolan, his wife Cynthia and stepdaughter Jinx visited the small South Australian settlement of Ooldea during their travels in Central Australia. The painting shows Irish Australian anthropologist Daisy Bates (1859–1951) standing alone in stark, barren landscape. Bates became famous for spending most of her later years living among Aboriginal tribes in the outback, including sixteen years at Ooldea.

Daisy Bates at Ooldea was acquired by the National Gallery of Australia in 1987. It was included in the 2000 international exhibition Painting the Century: 101 Portrait Masterpieces 1900–2000, held at the National Portrait Gallery in London.
