= William Harris (civil rights leader) =

Early Western Australian leader for Aboriginal civil rights

- Born: 1867
- Died: 13 July 1931 (aged 63–64)
- Years active: 1905-1927
- Known for: Opposition to the Aborigines Act, 1905, and in support of Aboriginal civil rights in Western Australia

William Harris (1867–1931) was an early Western Australian Noongar activist for Aboriginal civil rights. He has been called "the most significant voice of a generation with the education and social standing to assert their rights as British subjects".

Over the course of his life Harris worked as a miner, as a port and pastoral worker, and as a farmer. He also vocally protested the injustices of the Aborigines Act (1905), which effectively abolished the prior legal status and citizen rights of all persons of indigenous descent; and he was willing to criticize senior officials who were complacent or uninterested in the mistreatment of Aboriginal people. Although entitled to a personal exemption from the Aborigines Act, he declined this on the grounds that it reinforced the exclusion of others.

== Early life ==
William Harris was one of seven children born to convict William and his wife Madelaine, in Western Australia. One of his grandmothers was Aboriginal, and Harris received an initial rudimentary education as a private pupil at the Swan Native and Half-Caste Mission in Perth.

== Activism ==
While working at the ports and on stations in the Ashburton and Gascoyne districts of Western Australia, Harris witnessed the brutish and cruel practices used to oppress, disenfranchise and subjugate the local Aboriginal people. In 1904 The Times (London) and the Australia press published an account of the ill-treatment of Aboriginal people in the northwest of the state. Harris entered into the public debate with a letter to the press accusing the Colonial Secretary, Walter Kingsmill, of willful hypocrisy and misrepresentation. Kingsmill had vehemently denied there was any evidence of the ill-treatment of Aboriginal people. Harris also criticized the Chief Protector of Aborigines for Western Australia, Henry Charles Prinsep, for turning Aboriginal people off their land. At the time the State Registrar-General, Malcolm A.C. Fraser, had Harris in mind for a temporary position with the State Government to compile a vocabulary and descriptions of Aboriginal customs from different portions of the state for posterity. Within weeks of Harris’s letter, Fraser instead appointed the journalist Daisy Bates to the position.

Harris also prospected in the Eastern Goldfields of the state, where he observed extensive starvation and disease among the local Aboriginal population. Harris was so concerned by what he witnessed that he traveled to Perth and on 8 February 1906, he and the Goldfields MP, Patrick Lynch, met with the State Premier, Hector Rason. Harris explained that the Aboriginal people living on the eastern goldfields were in desperate need of food and medicine, and handed Rason a letter of support signed by the local Justices of the Peace. Harris also met Henry Charles Prinsep, to try to persuade his Aborigines Department to supply rations, clothes and medicine to those starving and diseased.

In 1926, Harris formed the Native Union, an Aboriginal peoples' union, in response to the persecution inflicted upon Aboriginal people by the Western Australian Aborigines Department and its officials. The Native Union was the first Indigenous political organisation in the state. He was particularly concerned about conditions at Mogumber (Moore River Native Settlement). After A. O. Neville had succeeded Prinsep as the Chief Protector of Aborigines, he changed the settlements purpose from an Aboriginal farming community to an internment camp, and conditions rapidly deteriorated for the Aboriginal residents. Harris' family had also been personally impacted by Neville, as his brother Edward Harris' four children had been taken away as part of the Stolen Generations and sent first to Carrolup Native Settlement, and later to Moore River Native Settlement.

Harris also headed the first Aboriginal deputation to meet with a Western Australian Premier. In 1928 he, his brother Edward, Norman Harris (his nephew), Wilfred Morrison, Edward Jacobs, Arthur Kickett and William Bodney met with the Premier, Philip Collier. They asked Collier to repeal the Aborigines Act (1905), and give Aboriginal people the same rights as the white community. Describing the conditions at Mogumber as intolerable, they implored him to close it down. They also asked about Aboriginal people being barred from the popular White City, Perth amusement park. William Harris also told Premier Collier that Daisy Bates and Chief Protector Neville were the "worst enemies" of the Aboriginal people, according to a contemporary newspaper account. Their representations were ultimately unsuccessful: The Aborigines Act (1905) continued to govern the lives of all Aboriginal people in Western Australia until it was repealed by the Native Welfare Act 1963; and Mogumber continued as a segregation facility until 1974, when the land was passed to the Aboriginal Lands Trust of Western Australia.

In 1930 William Harris moved to the town of Geraldton, where he died on 13 July 1931.
