= Isobel Mary White =

English-Australian anthropologist

- Born: Isobel Mary Lunn; 1912; Harrow, England
- Died: 1997 (aged 84–85)
- Other name: Sally White
- Occupation: Anthropologist
- Spouse: Michael White
- Children: Two

Isobel Mary White (1912–1997) was an English-Australian anthropologist whose publications beginning in the 1960s concentrated on the role of women in Aboriginal societies in Australia.

== Life ==
Isobel Mary Lunn, known to her friends as Sally, was born and grew up in Harrow, Middlesex (now part of London), until the family moved to Birmingham so her father could accept an appointment as a headmaster there.

A gifted mathematician, she read economics at Cambridge, under John Maynard Keynes. She completed the course in 1933, although the university did not then award degrees to female students. At completing her studies she was awarded a traveling scholarship for 1934/1935 to undertake research in Canada concerning "migrants and outworkers."

She married scientist Michael White in 1938 and had two sons during World War II. During the war Michael and Sally both worked in government service and spent significant time in London in spite of the London Blitz, periods of intense bombing. After the war, the family moved to the United States so Michael could pursue his career and Sally could begin to explore her new interest in anthropology, which grew from her research in Canada. Ten years later, her husband was awarded the chair of Zoology in Melbourne, Australia, causing the family to move there.

=== Career ===
In Melbourne, White first pursued her interest in anthropology through her membership in the Victorian Anthropological Society and then, beginning in 1964, with her appointment to the staff of the new Department of Anthropology at Monash University.

White chose to research the roles of women in Australia's Aboriginal societies. To do so she studied desert groups, conducting major fieldwork in the late 1960s and 1970s with the collaboration of linguist Luise Hercus and musicologists Catherine Ellis and Helen Payne. The resulting research was well received.

According to Standish, White noticed how women were marginalized in these societies,

Her own field work with Tiwi, as well as with Andagarinja, Jangkundjara and Pidjanjara women, looked at the exclusion of women from male rites examined in the light of reported ignorance of physiological paternity; role of women in physical procreation and birth, role of men in spiritual rebirth at initiation; acceptance of junior status by women and reinforcement of male superiority by men.

Beginning in the early 1980s, Sally served on the editorial board of Aboriginal History. She was a reviewer there for many years and co-edited with Judith Wilson and Isabel McBryde two special volumes (numbers 11 and 12) honouring their Canadian colleague Diane Barwick.

White died in 1997 (not in 1998 as some sources claim, which was the year of her memorial ceremony).

== Selected publications ==
- Hercus, Luise and Isobel White, 1973. 'Perception of kinship structure reflected in the Adnjamathantha pronouns'. In B. Schebeck, L.A. Hercus and I.M. White, Papers in Australian Linguistics No. 6. Pacific Linguistics Series No. 36, Department of Linguistics, R.S.P.S., Australian National University, Canberra, pp. 47–72.
- White, Isobel, 1970. 'Aboriginal women's status: A paradox resolved'. In F. Gale (ed) Women's role in Aboriginal society, AIAS, Canberra, pp. 21–29.
- White, Isobel, 1972. 'Hunting dogs at Yalata'. Mankind 8, pp. 201–205.
- White, Isobel, 1975. 'Sexual conquest and submission in the myths of Central Australia'. In L.R. Hiatt (ed) Australian Aboriginal Mythology, AIAS, Canberra, pp. 123–142.
- White, Isobel, 1977. 'From camp to village'. In R.M. Berndt (ed) Aborigines and Change: Australia in the 70s. AIAS, Canberra, pp. 100–105.
- White, Isobel, 1979. 'Rain ceremony at Yalata'. Canberra Anthropology 2(2), pp. 94–103.
- White, Isobel M. 1980. 'The birth and death of a ceremony'. Aboriginal History 4(1), pp. 32–41.
- White, Isobel, 1985a. 'Mangkatina: Woman of the desert'. In White, Barwick and Meehan (eds), Fighters and singers Allen and Unwin, Sydney, pp. 214–226.
- White, I.M., Barwick, D. and Meehan B. (eds). 1985b. Fighters and Singers: The lives of some Aboriginal women. Allen and Unwin, Sydney.
- White, Isobel (ed) 1985c. Daisy Bates: The Native Tribes of Western Australia. National Library of Australia, Canberra.
- White, Isobel, 1993. 'Daisy Bates: Legend and reality'. In Julie Marcus (ed) First in their Field: women and Australian Anthropology. Melbourne, Melbourne University Press, pp. 47–65.
- White, Isobel, and Helen Payne, 1992. 'Australian Aboriginal myth'. In Caroline Larrington (ed) The Feminist Companion to Mythology. Pandora Press, London, pp. 251 287.
