= Ford crossing, West Toodyay =

Coordinates: 31.5294°S 116.4193°E

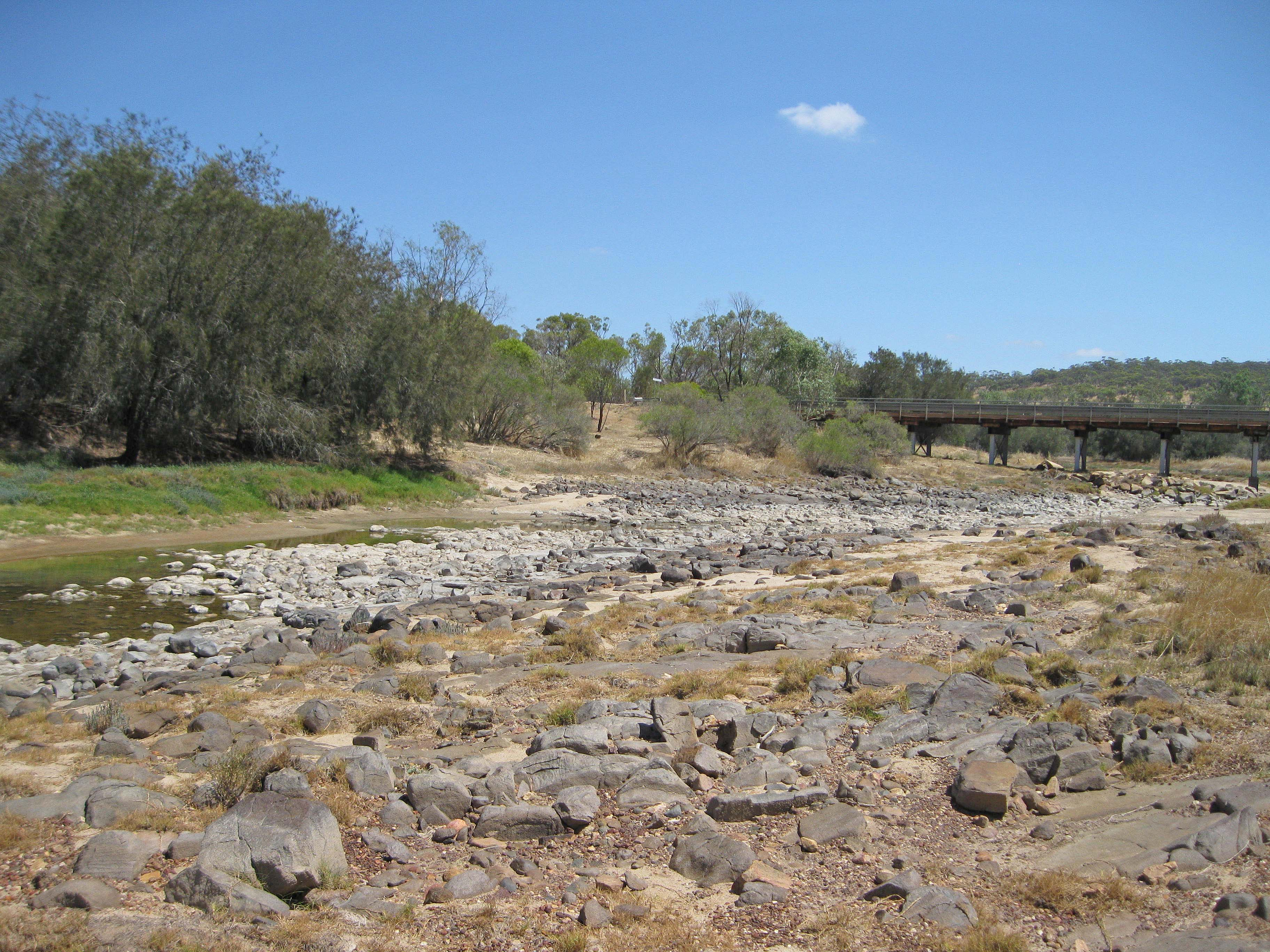
Natural ford crossing, West Toodyay, 2016

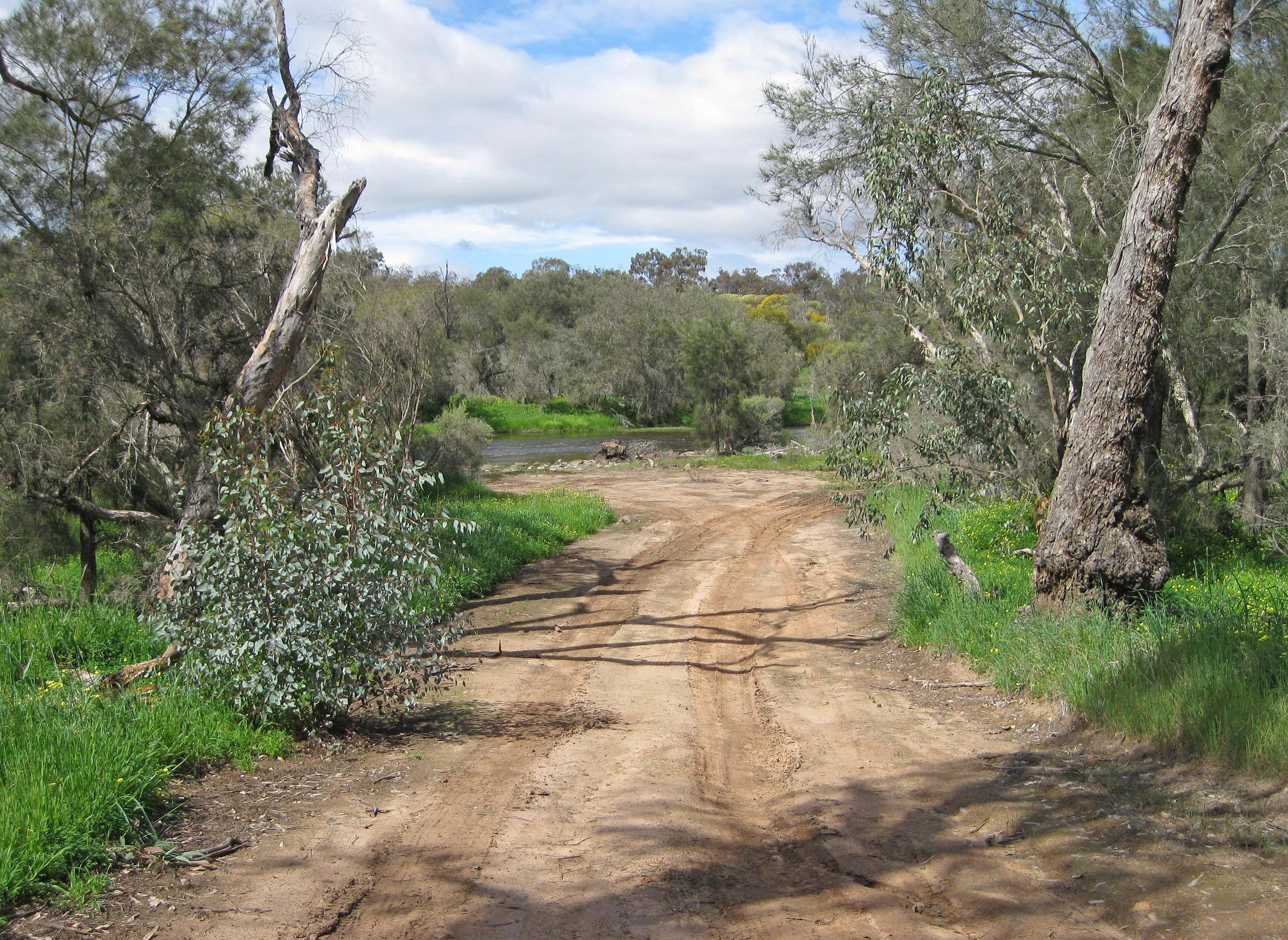
Northern approach from near the site of the Highland Laddie

The ford crossing is a natural feature of the Avon River in West Toodyay, Western Australia. It was used by the early settlers in the area to cross the river before the construction of the West Toodyay Bridge.

For many years the whereabouts of the ford remained a mystery. It is not marked on any early survey map. In addition, the building of the West Toodyay Bridge in 1902 negated its use and details of its existence were lost. However, research carried out and published in 2010 revealed that the ford crossing was, and still is, a natural feature of the Avon River. A wide rocky shelf spans the river immediately upstream from the West Toodyay Bridge. It would have facilitated an easy crossing. In addition, the approaches on either side are relatively protected from erosion during times of flood.

It is highly probable that the rocky ford crossing was part of a long established trail used by the local indigenous Ballardong Noongar people as they travelled up and down the Toodyay valley.

The ford proved ideal for the passage of horse, cart and wagon across the Avon River. If, however, the river was in flood, any crossing of the river would have been too dangerous to attempt. Nevertheless, unlike other purposely built fords, there appear to have been no reports of damage to the ford, even in times of severe flooding, nor of any repairs having been carried out to its approaches.

On the upstream side of the ford lay a long pool. The pool was fed by a permanently running spring that entered the river bed from the north side of the Avon River. Thus, throughout the heat of summer, the pool was ever present. The Military Barracks also stood upstream from the ford crossing on the left hand bank of the river. The ford crossing proved to be of paramount importance to the early inhabitants of the town of Toodyay, as well as those in the valley beyond.
