= West Toodyay Bridge =

Road bridge in Toodyay, Western Australia

Coordinates: 31.5302°S 116.4188°E

Location of the West Toodyay Bridge.

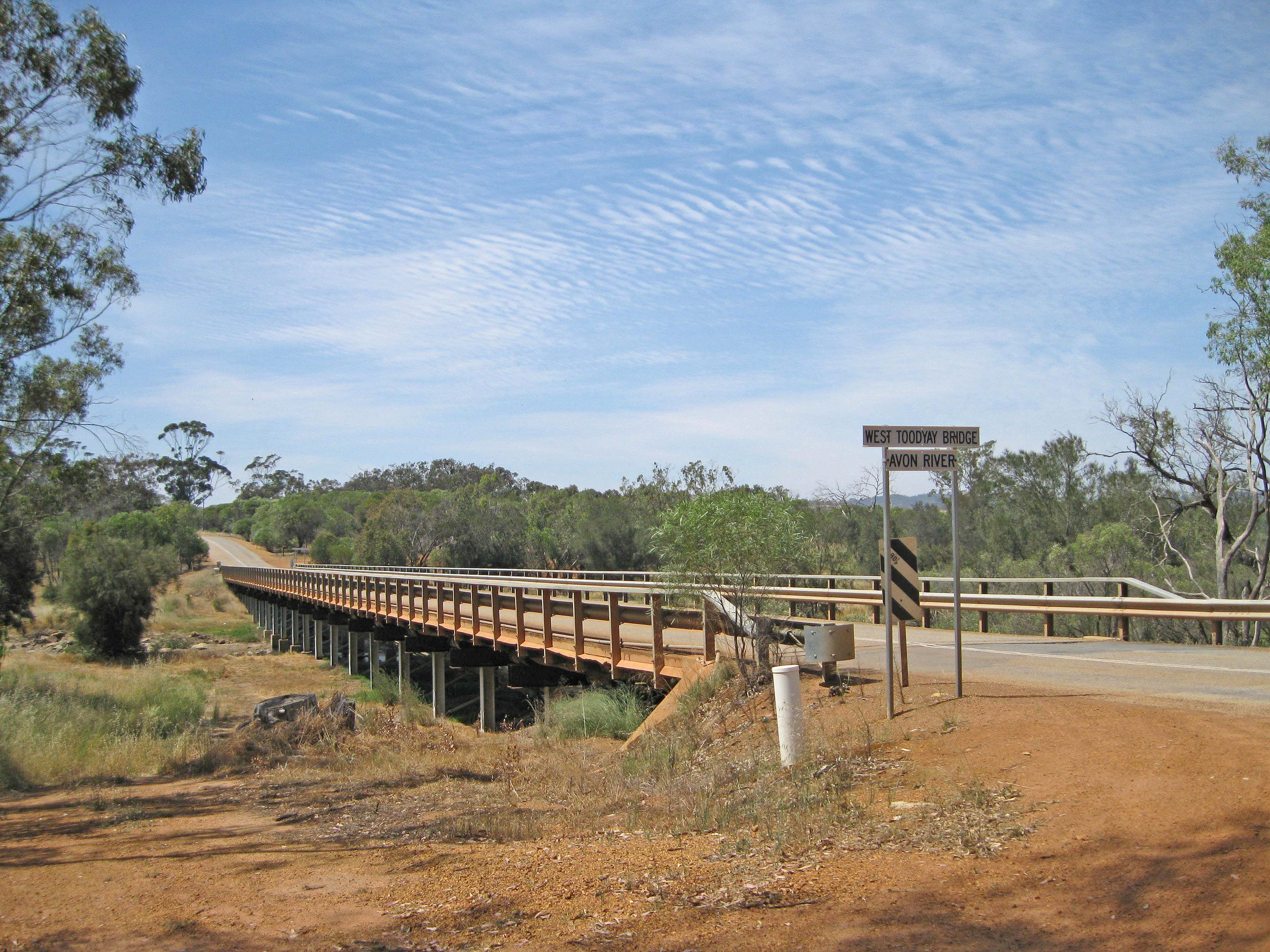
West Toodyay Bridge, 2015

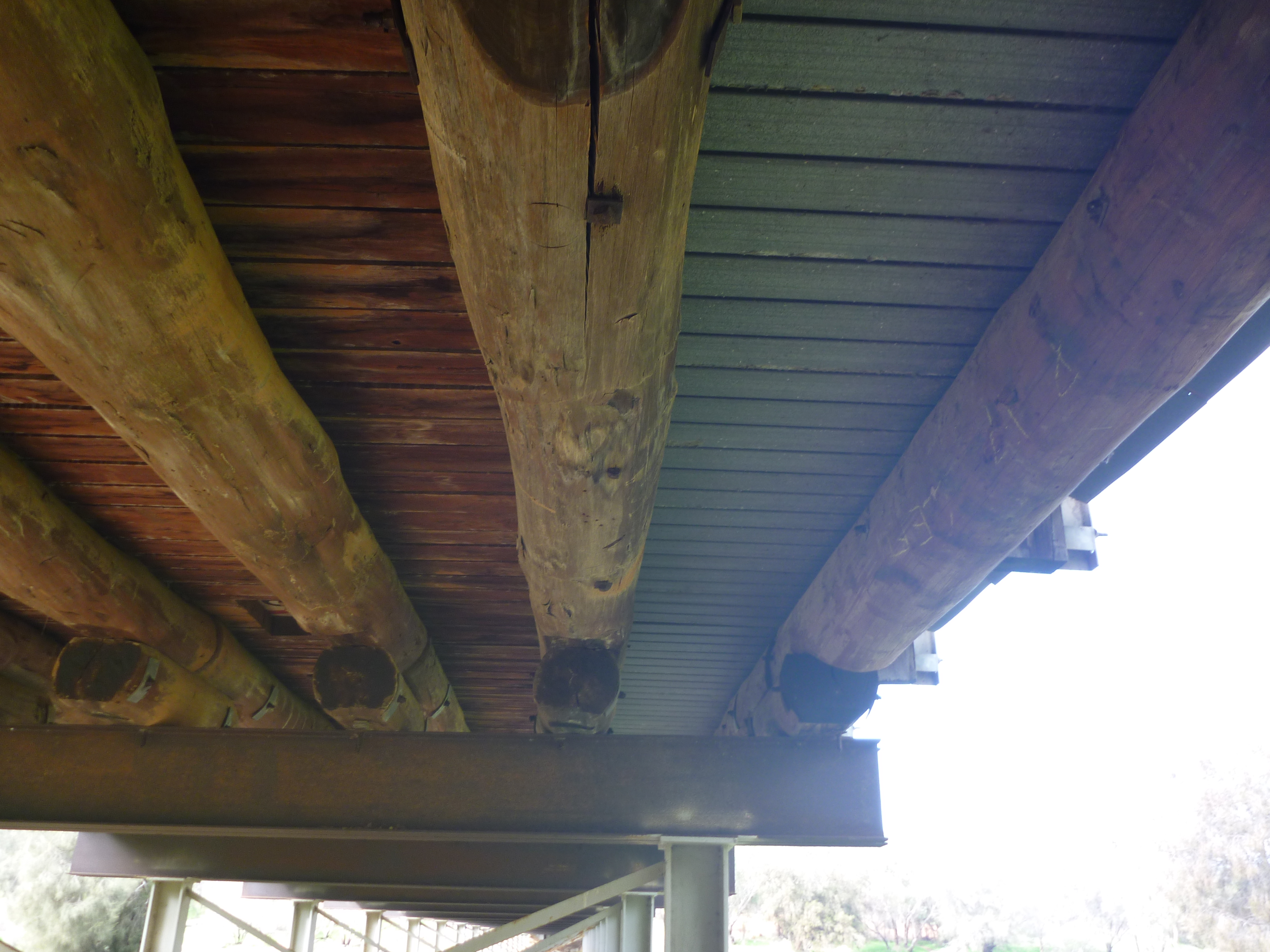
The underside of the bridge, showing construction method and the 1985 width extension.

The West Toodyay Bridge crosses the Avon River in West Toodyay, Western Australia.

It was constructed in 1902 at a cost of £500. Built of timber, it was 4 metres (13 ft) wide and 120 metres (390 ft) in length. The bridge could only be crossed by one vehicle at a time.

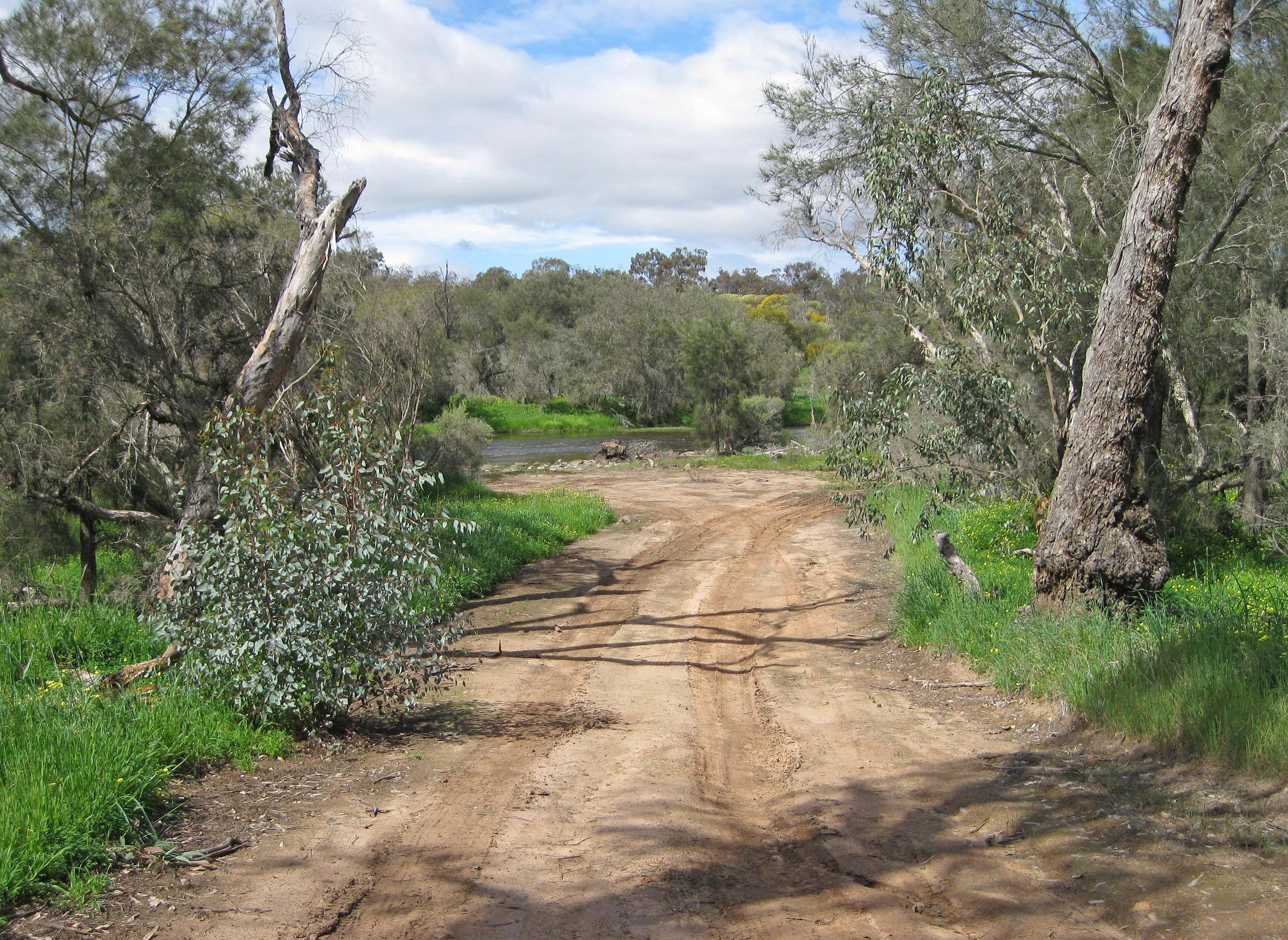
Northern approach to the ford, from near the site of the Highland Laddie.

Prior to the bridge's construction, a nearby natural ford was used to cross the river.

To this day, the bridge stands in its original position. However, a number of modifications have been carried out since its original construction.

In 1958, the timber deck was replaced. In 1985, structural damage was caused by an overloaded truck and inspection revealed that several piles were rotten. For safety reasons, a load limit was put in place until repairs could be carried out. Three years later, in 1988, the bridge underwent a considerable upgrade. The bridge was widened to carry two lanes and the wooden piles were replaced with steel. A few old stringers were replaced with new timber. However, the remaining stringers and deck structure were deemed to be in satisfactory condition. The timber decking was overlaid with a concrete surface.

On 30 November 1988, the West Toodyay Bridge reopened.
