= List of 2002 films based on actual events =

This is a list of films and miniseries that are based on actual events. All films on this list are from American production unless indicated otherwise.

== 2002 ==
- 8 Mile (2002) – biographical drama film inspired by the life of American rapper Eminem
- 11′09″01 September 11 (2002) – international anthology film composed of 11 contributions from 11 filmmakers, each from a different country - each gave their own vision of the events in New York City during the September 11 attacks, in a short film of 11 minutes, 9 seconds, and one frame
- 23rd March 1931: Shaheed (Hindi: शहीद) (2002) – Indian Hindi-language historical biographical film about Bhagat Singh, depicting the events leading up to the hanging of Singh and his companions Shivaram Rajguru and Sukhdev Thapar on 23 March 1931
- 24 Hour Party People (2002) – British biographical comedy drama film about Manchester's popular music community from 1976 to 1992, and specifically about Factory Records
- 10,000 Black Men Named George (2002) – biographical drama television film following union activist A. Philip Randolph's efforts to organize the black porters of the Pullman Company in 1920s America, known as the Brotherhood of Sleeping Car Porters
- A Is for Acid (2002) – British crime television film based on the life of the serial killer John Haigh, known as the Acid Bath Murderer, because he dissolved the bodies of six people in sulphuric acid
- A Journey Called Love (Italian: Un viaggio chiamato amore) (2002) – Italian romantic drama film telling the tormented relationship between the writer Sibilla Aleramo and the poet Dino Campana
- Adaptation (2002) – comedy drama film based on Charlie Kaufman's struggles to adapt Susan Orlean's 1998 nonfiction book The Orchid Thief while suffering from writer's block
- The Adversary (French: L'Adversaire) (2002) – French drama film inspired by the real-life story of Jean-Claude Romand
- AKA (2002) – British drama film telling the story of a disaffected youth's search for love, status, and identity in late 1970s Britain, largely based on Duncan Roy's early life
- Amen. (2002) – historical war drama film examining the political and diplomatic relationship between the Vatican and Nazi Germany during World War II
- Anita and Me (2002) – British comedy drama film depicting a semi-autobiographical account of Meera Syal's childhood
- Antwone Fisher (2002) – biographical drama film based on the life of Antwone Fisher
- Auto Focus (2002) – biographical drama film telling a dramatized story of the actor Bob Crane, an affable radio show host and amateur drummer who found success on Hogan's Heroes, a popular television sitcom, and his dramatic descent into the underbelly of Hollywood after the series was cancelled and he formed a friendship with John Henry Carpenter
- Baader (2002) – German biographical drama film about revolutionary Andreas Baader of the notorious Red Army Faction ("the Baader-Meinhof Gang") which operated mainly in West Germany during the 1970s
- Balzac and the Little Chinese Seamstress (Mandarin: 巴爾扎克與小裁縫; French: Balzac et la Petite Tailleuse Chinoise) (2002) – Chinese-French romantic drama film revolving around two young Chinese boys of bourgeois background who were sent to a remote village in Sichuan for three years of re-education during the Cultural Revolution, based on the 2000 semi-autobiographical novel of the same title by Dai
- The Bankers of God: The Calvi Affair (Italian: I banchieri di Dio) (2002) – Italian drama film telling the story of the scandal of Banco Ambrosiano, mainly related to the figure of Roberto Calvi
- Benjamin Franklin (2002) – biographical drama miniseries about American polymath Benjamin Franklin
- Bertie and Elizabeth (2002) – British biographical drama television film exploring the relationship between King George VI and his wife Queen Elizabeth from their first meeting to the King's death in the winter of 1952
- Better Luck Tomorrow (2002) – crime drama film drawing inspiration from several sources, including the Columbine shootings and the murder of Stuart Tay, a teenager from Orange County, California
- Black and White (2002) – Australian biographical drama film telling the story of Max Stuart, a young aboriginal man who was sentenced to death after being found guilty of the murder of a nine-year-old girl on what was considered questionable evidence
- Bloody Sunday (2002) – British-Irish historical war drama film based around the 1972 "Bloody Sunday" shootings in Derry, Northern Ireland
- Bolívar, That's Me! (Spanish: Bolívar soy yo) (2002) – Colombian-French historical film detailing the story of an actor who is known for his interpretation of "El Libertador", Simón Bolívar
- Callas Forever (2002) – biographical drama film centring on the making of a movie of Georges Bizet's Carmen
- Catch Me If You Can (2002) – biographical crime drama film about Frank Abagnale Jr. who successfully performed cons worth millions of dollars by posing as a Pan American World Airways pilot, a Georgia doctor, and a Louisiana parish prosecutor
- Champion (Korean: 챔피언) (2002) – South Korean sport drama film about South Korean boxer Duk Koo Kim
- Chicago (2002) – musical black comedy crime film loosely based on two unrelated 1924 court cases involving two women, Beulah Annan (the inspiration for Roxie Hart) and Belva Gaertner (the inspiration for Velma), who were both suspected and later acquitted of murder, whom Maurine Dallas Watkins had covered for the Chicago Tribune as a reporter
- Chopin: Desire for Love (Polish: Chopin. Pragnienie miłości) (2002) – Polish biographical film based on the life story of the Polish pianist and composer Frédéric Chopin
- City by the Sea (2002) – crime drama film based on the story of Vincent LaMarca
- City of God (Portuguese: Cidade de Deus) (2002) – Brazilian epic crime film depicting the growth of organized crime in the Cidade de Deus suburb of Rio de Janeiro, between the end of the 1960s and the beginning of the 1980s, loosely based on real events
- The Clay Bird (Bengali: মাটির ময়না) (2002) – Bangladeshi war drama film about Tareque Masud's childhood experiences against the backdrop of 1969 Mass uprising in East Pakistan on the eve of Bangladesh Liberation War
- Confessions of a Dangerous Mind (2002) – biographical spy film depicting the fictional life of game show host and producer Chuck Barris
- Conviction (2002) – American-Canadian biographical television film about Carl Upchurch, a hardcore felon who managed to educate himself and developed a spiritual awakening during one of his numerous stints inside prison
- Copenhagen (2002) – British drama television film concerning a meeting between the physicists Niels Bohr and Werner Heisenberg in Copenhagen in 1941 to discuss their work and past friendship, and also revolving around Heisenberg's role in the German atomic bomb program during World War II
- Crossed Over (2002) – Canadian drama television film telling the true story of the deep and healing friendship between a grieving mother, Beverly Lowry, and death row inmate, Karla Faye Tucker
- Dahmer (2002) – crime drama film based on the crimes of Jeffrey Dahmer, a serial killer, who killed seventeen young men and boys in Bath, Ohio and Milwaukee, Wisconsin between 1978 and 1991
- Dickens (2002) – British biographical drama miniseries depicting the life of the author Charles Dickens
- Door to Door (2002) – drama television film about Bill Porter, an inspiring and successful door-to-door salesman with cerebral palsy
- Double Teamed (2002) – family sport drama television film based on the life stories of identical twin professional basketball players Heather and Heidi Burge
- Drunk on Women and Poetry (Korean: 치화선) (2002) – South Korean biographical drama film about Jang Seung-eop (commonly known by his pen name, Owon), a nineteenth-century Korean painter who changed the direction of Korean art
- The Embalmer (Italian: L'imbalsamatore) (2002) – Italian film noir drama film about a solitary embalmer meets a charming and unemployed waiter who becomes his assistant, based on real events
- The Enclave (Dutch: De Enclave) (2002) – Dutch biographical miniseries about the fall of Srebrenica and the Dutch government's failure to protect the town from attackers
- Evelyn (2002) – Irish drama film based on the true story of Desmond Doyle and his fight in the Irish courts to be reunited with his children
- Facing the Truth (Danish: At kende sandheden) (2002) – Danish drama film based on the real life of Nils Malmros' father
- The Falklands Play (2002) – British war drama television film depicting the political events leading up to, and including, the 1982 Falklands War
- Fidel (2002) – biographical drama miniseries describing the Cuban revolution and political career of Fidel Castro
- Frida (2002) – biographical drama film depicting the professional and private life of the surrealist Mexican artist Frida Kahlo
- Führer Ex (2002) – German historical drama film based on former neo-nazi Ingo Hasselbach's autobiographical experiences
- Gada Meilin (Mandarin: 嘎達梅林) (2002) – Chinese adventure drama film telling the story of Inner Mongolian hero Gada Meiren, who led a failed rebellion at the beginning of the 1930s against dispossession of Mongol banner lands by Zhang Zuolin and Zhang Xueliang
- Gangs of New York (2002) – historical drama film detailing the rise and fall of 19th century gangs in New York City, prior to the domination of the Italian-American Mafia during Prohibition in the 1920s
- The Gathering Storm (2002) – American-British biographical television film about Winston Churchill in the years just prior to World War II
- Gerry (2002) – drama film inspired by the events surrounding the death of David Coughlin, who was killed after he and a friend became lost in Rattlesnake Canyon in New Mexico
- Gleason (2002) – American-Canadian biographical television film following the life of Jackie Gleason
- Gotta Kick It Up! (2002) – family drama television film based on a true story of a middle school dance team
- Harold Shipman: Doctor Death (2002) – British crime drama television film about the life and crimes of serial killer Harold Shipman
- Hason Raja (Bengali: হাছন রাজা) (2002) – Bangladeshi biographical drama film about poet and philosopher of Bangladesh Hason Raja
- Hell on Heels: The Battle of Mary Kay (2002) – American-Canadian biographical comedy drama television film based on the true story of a corporate war in the mid-1990s between cosmetics queen Mary Kay Ash and an ambitious newcomer, Jinger Heath, who launches a rival company
- House of Fools (Russian: Дом дураков) (2002) – Russian biographical drama film about psychiatric patients and combatants during the First Chechen War
- Jean Duceppe (2002) – Canadian French-language biographical miniseries telling the story of Jean Duceppe, a Canadian actor, and chronicled his life, in particular his work in theatre and struggle for Quebec independence
- Jeffrey Archer: The Truth (2002) – British comedy drama television film based on the life of Jeffrey Archer
- Joe and Max (2002) – American-German sport drama film based on the true story of the two boxing matches between American Joe Louis and German Max Schmeling
- John XXIII: The Pope of Peace (Italian: Papa Giovanni – Ioannes XXIII) (2002) – Italian biographical drama television film based on real life events of Roman Catholic Pope John XXIII
- Julius Caesar (2002) – American-Italian-Dutch-German historical miniseries dramatizing the life of Julius Caesar from 82 BC to his death in 44 BC
- The Junction Boys (2002) – sport drama television film about the Junction Boys, the "survivors" of Texas A&M Aggies football coach Bear Bryant's brutal 10-day summer camp in Junction, Texas, beginning September 1, 1954
- K-19: The Widowmaker (2002) – American-British-German-Canadian historical submarine film about the first Soviet ballistic missile nuclear submarine, the K-19
- Kedma (Hebrew: קדמה) (2002) – Cinema of Israel historical film set during the opening stages of the 1948 Arab–Israeli War, following the fate of a group of refugees from the Holocaust who are illegally brought to Israel by the Palmach
- Kumamoto Stories (Japanese: 熊本物語) (2002) – Japanese historical anthology film containing three short films produced between 1998 and 2002 presenting legends about the history of Kumamoto Prefecture
- Lapu-Lapu (2002) – Filipino historical drama film based on the 1521 encounter of Lapu-Lapu and other pre-Hispanic Philippine natives with explorer Ferdinand Magellan and his crew, who were serving the Spanish Empire
- The Laramie Project (2002) – crime drama film telling the story of the aftermath of the 1998 murder of Matthew Shepard in Laramie, Wyoming
- Last Call (2002) – American-Canadian biographical drama film about the last months of F. Scott Fitzgerald's life
- The Legend of Bhagat Singh (Hindi: द लेजेंड ऑफ़ भगत सिंह) (2002) – Indian Hindi language biographical historical film about Bhagat Singh, a revolutionary who fought for Indian independence along with fellow members of the Hindustan Socialist Republican Association
- The Life of Aleksis Kivi (Finnish: Aleksis Kiven elämä) (2002) – Finnish biographical drama film telling the story of Aleksis Kivi, the national writer of Finland
- Lilya 4-ever (2002) – Swedish-Danish crime drama film loosely based on the true case of Danguolė Rasalaitė
- Live from Baghdad (2002) – war drama television film about CNN producer Robert Wiener's experiences before the Persian Gulf War, which lasted from August 1990 to February 1991
- Madame Satã (2002) – Brazilian-French biographical drama film telling the story of Madame Satã
- The Magdalene Sisters (2002) – British-Irish biographical drama film about three teenage girls who were sent to Magdalene asylums (also known as Magdalene laundries), homes for women who were labelled as "fallen" by their families or society
- The Man Who Saved Christmas (2002) – family biographical drama film based on the true story about the efforts of toymaker Alfred Carlton Gilbert of the A. C. Gilbert Company to continue making toys during World War I
- Martin and Lewis (2002) – biographical television film exploring the lives of the comedy team of Martin and Lewis
- Master Spy: The Robert Hanssen Story (2002) – American-Canadian biographical television film based on the story of Robert Hanssen, who was charged with and convicted of selling American secrets to the Soviet Union
- The Matthew Shepard Story (2002) – American-Canadian biographical crime television film based on the true story of Matthew Shepard, a 21-year-old gay youth who was murdered in 1998
- Monday Night Mayhem (2002) – drama television film about the origin of ABC's television series Monday Night Football
- Mondays in the Sun (Spanish: Los lunes al sol) (2002) – Spanish-French-Italian drama film depicting the degrading effects of unemployment on a group of men left jobless by the closure of the shipyards in Vigo, Galicia
- The Mothman Prophecies (2002) – supernatural horror film claiming to be based on actual events that occurred between November 1966 and December 1967 in Point Pleasant
- Muhammad: The Last Prophet (2002) – American-Egyptian-Lebanese animated religious epic focusing on the early days of Islam and Muhammad
- Murder in Greenwich (2002) – crime television film telling the story of Martha Moxley, a 15-year-old girl who was murdered in Greenwich, Connecticut in the 1970s
- Napoléon (2002) – French-Canadian historical miniseries exploring the life of Napoleon Bonaparte
- Nightstalker (2002) – crime horror film about American serial killer, serial rapist, and burglar Richard Ramirez
- Our America (2002) – drama television film depicting the true story of two African-American teen radio reporters and their documentary investigation of a notorious child murder
- Paid in Full (2002) – crime drama film based on the 1980s Harlem drug dealers Azie "AZ" Faison, Rich Porter, and Alpo Martinez
- Path to War (2002) – biographical television film dealing directly with the Vietnam War as seen through the eyes of United States President Lyndon B. Johnson and his cabinet members
- The Pennsylvania Miners' Story (2002) – biographical drama television film based on the real events occurred at the Quecreek Mine
- Perlasca, an Italian Hero (Italian: Perlasca – Un eroe Italiano) (2002) – Italian biographical drama film about Giorgio Perlasca, an Italian businessman working in Hungary for his government
- The Pianist (2002) – biographical war drama film about the life of Polish-Jewish pianist and composer Władysław Szpilman, a Holocaust survivor
- Point of Origin (2002) – biographical crime television film detailing an account of the true story of the convicted serial arsonist John Leonard Orr
- Rabbit-Proof Fence (2002) – Australian drama film loosely based on a true story concerning Doris Pilkington Garimara's mother Molly Craig, as well as two other Aboriginal girls, Daisy Kadibil and Gracie, who escaped from the Moore River Native Settlement, north of Perth, Western Australia, to return to their Aboriginal families, after being placed there in 1931
- RFK (2002) – historical drama television film taking place through the eyes of Robert F. Kennedy after his brother John F. Kennedy's assassination in 1963
- The Road from Coorain (2002) – biographical drama television film based on Australian writer Jill Ker Conway's celebrated autobiography about a heroic and ambitious woman's struggle for independence, and her complex relationship with her mother
- The Rookie (2002) – sport drama film based on the true story of Jim Morris who debuted in Major League Baseball at age 35
- The Rosa Parks Story (2002) – biographical drama television film about Rosa Parks and the Montgomery bus boycott in 1955
- Safe Conduct (French: Laissez-passer) (2002) – French historical drama film based on the memories of the veteran French director Jean Devaivre, active in the film industry and the resistance during the Second World War
- Savage Messiah (French: Moïse, l’affaire Roch Thériault) (2002) – Canadian thriller drama film dramatizing the real-life story of Roch "Moïse" Thériault, a cult leader who was arrested in Burnt River, Ontario, in 1989
- Shackleton (2002) – British historical drama film telling the true story of Shackleton's 1914 Antarctic expedition on the ship Endurance
- Shaheed-E-Azam (Hindi: शहीद-ए-आजम) (2002) – Indian Hindi-language biographical film based upon the life of Shaheed Bhagat Singh
- Sightings: Heartland Ghost (2002) – drama television film based on the TV series Sightings and inspired by true events
- Silent Night (2002) – Canadian war drama television film set on Christmas Eve in 1944, during the Battle of the Bulge of World War II, loosely based on true events
- Sins of the Father (2002) – crime drama television film based on an article by Pamela Colloff published in the April 2000 issue of Texas Monthly, chronicling the 1963 16th Street Baptist Church bombing in Birmingham, Alabama, in which four young African-American girls were killed while attending Sunday school
- Song of the Miraculous Hind (Hungarian: Ének a csodaszarvasról) (2002) – Hungarian animated historical film telling the story of the Hungarian people, from the creation of the first humans to the time of Prince Géza, when the nation was Christianized
- The Soul Keeper (Italian: Prendimi l'anima; French: L'âme en jeu) (2002) – Italian-French-British romantic drama film loosely based on real life events of Russian psychoanalyst and physician Sabina Spielrein and notably on her therapeutic and sentimental relationship with fellow psychoanalyst Carl Gustav Jung
- St. Francis (Italian: Francesco) (2002) – Italian drama television film based on real life events of Roman Catholic Friar and then Saint Francis of Assisi
- The Star (Russian: Звезда) (2002) – Russian historical war film about a group of Soviet scouts working behind enemy lines during Operation Bagration in World War II
- Sunday (2002) – British biographical drama television film dramatising the events of "Bloody Sunday" through the eyes of the families of the dead and injured, specifically those of Leo Young, older brother of John Young, who was killed on the day
- Tagged: The Jonathan Wamback Story (2002) – Canadian drama television film based on a true story about Jonathan Wamback who, in 1999, was beaten by a group of teenagers and left to die near his Newmarket home
- Ted Bundy (2002) – American-British biographical crime thriller film dramatizing the crimes of Ted Bundy, an American serial killer who raped and murdered dozens of women and girls throughout the United States during the 1970s
- Torso: The Evelyn Dick Story (2002) – Canadian crime thriller television film based on the 1946–47 murder trial of Evelyn Dick that remains a lurid murder case in Canadian history
- Trudeau (2002) – Canadian biographical drama miniseries dramatizing the life of former Canadian Prime Minister Pierre Elliott Trudeau
- Two Men Went to War (2002) – British war comedy drama film based on a true World War II story, from Raymond Foxall's book Amateur Commandos which describes the adventures of two army dental corps soldiers who sneak off on their own personal invasion of France
- Vampire Clan (2002) – horror drama film based on the horrific true story of the 1996 "Vampire Killings" in Florida
- Video Voyeur (2002) – drama television film based on the real-life story of Susan Wilson, a Louisiana woman, who was videotaped in her own home by a neighbor
- Warning: Parental Advisory (2002) – drama television film based on the formation of the Parents Music Resource Center and its impact on music during 1985
- We Were Soldiers (2002) – American-German-French war film dramatizing the Battle of Ia Drang on November 14, 1965
- When the Last Sword Is Drawn (Japanese: 壬生義士伝) (2002) – Japanese historical drama film telling the story of two Shinsengumi samurai, loosely based on real historical events
- Whitewash: The Clarence Brandley Story (2002) – biographical drama television film telling the true story of Clarence Brandley, who was wrongly convicted for the rape and murder of Cheryl Dee Fergeson in 1981
- Windtalkers (2002) – war drama film based on the real story of Navajo code talkers during World War II
- Yossi & Jagger (Hebrew: יוסי וג'אגר) (2002) – Israeli romantic drama film about soldiers at the Israel–Lebanon border who try to find some peace and solace from the daily routine of war
