= Rabbit-proof fence (disambiguation) =

The rabbit-proof fence or pest-exclusion fence is one that crosses the state of Western Australia from north to south.

Rabbit-proof fence may also refer to:

- Rabbit-Proof Fence, a 2002 film adaptation of a historical novel by Doris Pilkington Garimara
- Darling Downs-Moreton Rabbit Board fence, a rabbit-exclusion fence along part of the Queensland-New South Wales border

== See also ==
- Follow the Rabbit-Proof Fence, the 1996 book by Doris Pilkington Garimara
