= Anna Haebich =

Australian historian and academic (born 1949)

Anna Haebich AM, FAHA, FASSA
- Born: 18 December 1949 (age 76); Toowoomba, Queensland
- Awards: Western Australian Premier's Literary Award for Non-Fiction (1989); Nettie Palmer Prize for Non-Fiction (2001); New South Wales Premier's Book of the Year (2001); New South Wales Premier's Gleebooks Prize for Critical Writing (2001); Centenary Medal (2003); Fellow of the Australian Academy of the Humanities (2006); Fellow of the Academy of the Social Sciences in Australia (2007); Margaret Medcalf Award (2011); Member of the Order of Australia (2024)

Academic background
- Education: University of Western Australia (BA [Hons]); Curtin University (BA); Murdoch University (PhD)
- Thesis: "A Bunch of Cast-offs": Aborigines of the Southwest of Western Australia, 1900–1936 (1985)
- Doctoral advisor: R. H. W. Reece

Academic work
- Discipline: History
- Sub-discipline: Indigenous history
- Institutions: Curtin University; Griffith University; Murdoch University; Edith Cowan University
- Notable works: Broken Circles (2000)

Anna Elizabeth Haebich, AM, FAHA, FASSA (/ˈheɪbɪk/ HAY-bik; born 18 December 1949) is an Australian writer, historian and academic.

== Early life and education ==
Anna Elizabeth Haebich was born on 18 December 1949 in Toowoomba, Queensland.

She attended Wollongong High School, and went on to earn a BA (Hons) in Anthropology from the University of Western Australia in 1972.

In 1985 she completed a PhD at Murdoch University. In the early 1990s she turned her studies to fine arts, and in 1994 graduated with a BA (Fine Arts) degree from the School of Art at Curtin University, as the top student in both painting and visual culture.

== Academic career ==
Haebich was the foundation Director of the Centre for Public Culture and Ideas at Griffith University, and later a Research Intensive Professor at the university. She also led the Griffith Research Program "Creative for Life" that addressed creativity across cultures and generations and was the Griffith University Orbicom UNESCO Chair.

As of 2017 she is a John Curtin Distinguished Professor and Senior Research Fellow in the Faculty of Humanities at Curtin University.

== Publications ==
Haebich is the author of a number of influential and award winning books focusing on Indigenous history and Australia's discriminatory policies, including For Their Own Good: Aborigines and Government in the South West of Western Australia 1900 to 1940 (1988) and Broken Circles Fragmenting Indigenous Families 1800–2000 (2000). For Their Own Good won the 1989 Western Australian Premier's Literature Award for Non-Fiction and Broken Circles received a number of awards including NSW Premiers Book of the Year 2001 and 2001 Stanner Award from AIATSIS.

Haebich was one of a group of writers involved in unravelling the Moore River Native Settlement history, and the legacy of A.O. Neville on generations of Indigenous Australians. Susan Maushart, Rosemary van den Berg, Jack Davis, and Doris Pilkington.

More recent publications investigate the personal history of individuals that lived in Western Australia including Murdering Stepmothers The Execution of Martha Rendell and A Boy's Short Life Warren Braedon/Louis Johnson.

Dancing in the Shadows – A History of Nyungar Performance (2018), "explores the power of Indigenous performance pitted against the forces of settler colonialism."

== Other roles and activities ==
She has also been a member of the AIATSIS Research Advisory Committee.

== Recognition and honours ==
Haebich was elected a Fellow of the Australian Academy of the Humanities (FAHA) in 2006 and of the Academy of the Social Sciences in Australia (FASSA) in 2007.

Haebich was appointed a Member of the Order of Australia in the 2024 Australia Day Honours for "significant service to literature as an author, historian and academic".

== Publications ==
- Haebich, A. (2018) Dancing in the Shadows – Histories of Nyungar Performance UWA Publishing.
- Haebich, A. (2013) A Boy's Short Life Warren Braedon/Louis Johnson – co-authored with Steve Mickler: UWA Publishing.
- Haebich, A. (2010) Murdering Stepmothers The Execution of Martha Rendell, Nedlands: UWA Publishing.
- Haebich, A. (2008) Spinning the Dream Assimilation in Australia, Fremantle: Fremantle Press.
- Haebich, A. (2004) Clearing the wheat belt. Erasing the indigenous presence in the southwest of Western Australia, The Genocide Question.
- Haebich, A. (2003) Many Voices Reflections on Experiences of Indigenous Child Separation. Canberra: National Library of Australia.
- Haebich, A. (2000) Broken Circles Fragmenting Indigenous Families 1800–2000, Fremantle: Fremantle Arts Centre Press.
- Haebich, A. (1988) For Their Own Good: Aborigines and Government in the South West of Western Australia 1900 to 1940, Nedlands: UWA Press.
