= Everlyn Sampi =

Australian actress (born 1988)

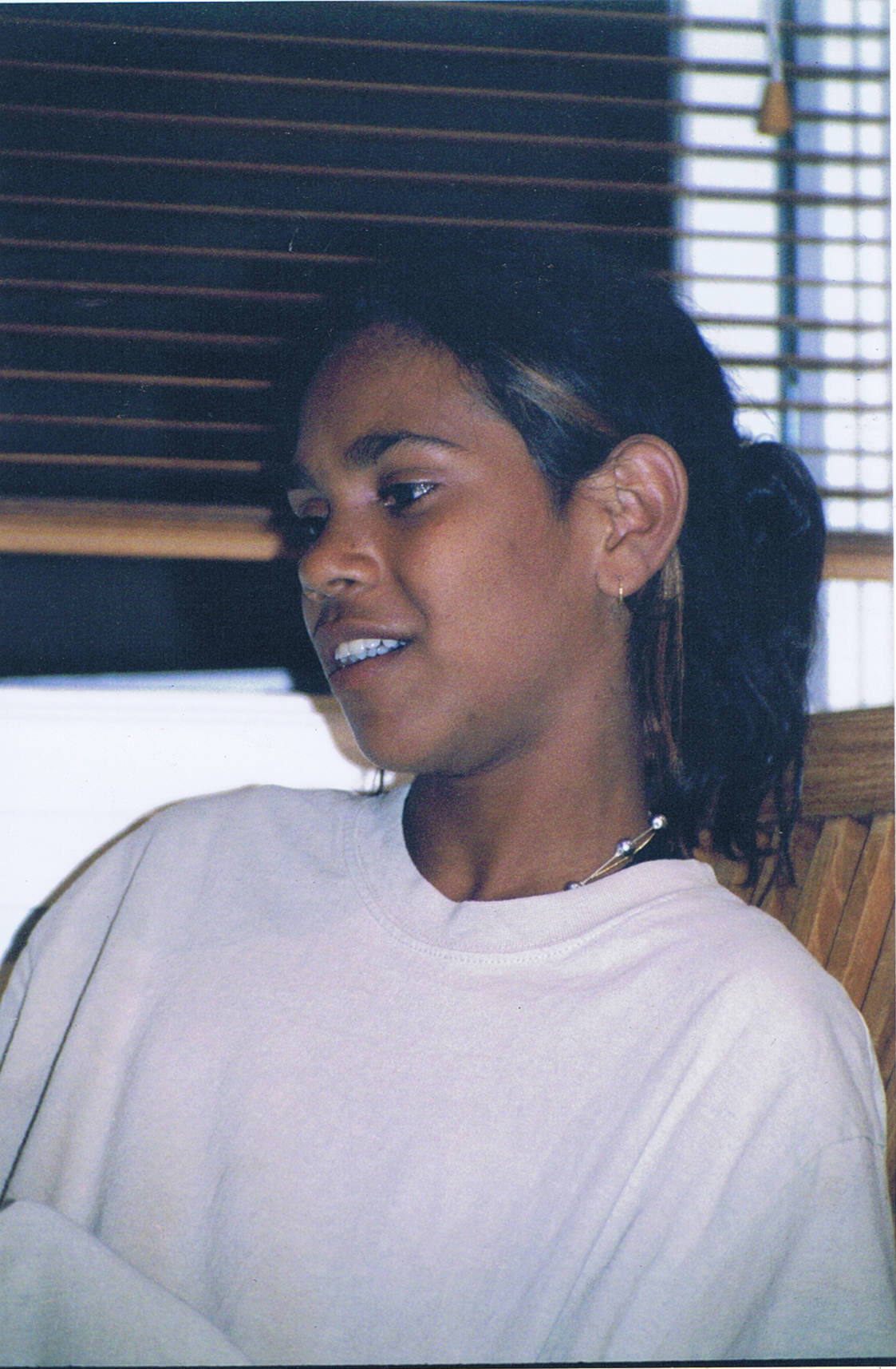
- Sampi in December 2003
- Born: 6 October 1988 (age 37); Derby, Western Australia
- Occupation: Actress
- Years active: 1999–present

Everlyn Lee Marie Sampi (born 6 October 1988) is an Australian actress. She is of Bardi Australian Aboriginal and Scottish descent.

Sampi starred in the 2002 film Rabbit-Proof Fence, as child of the stolen generation Molly Craig. The film is based on the true story depicted in the novel Follow the Rabbit-Proof Fence, written by Craig's daughter Doris Pilkington Garimara. Sampi won the 4th Annual Lexus Inside Film Awards for Best Actress on 6 November 2002 for her role in the film.

Sampi appeared in the 2007 Australian television drama series The Circuit, as the character Leonie.

Sampi now lives in Broome, Western Australia.
