= Balfour Downs Station =

Pastoral lease in Western Australia

Coordinates: 22°48′00″S 120°51′48″E

Location of Balfour Downs Station in the Pilbara region of Western Australia

Balfour Downs Station is a pastoral lease and cattle station located approximately 132 kilometres (82 mi) northeast of Newman, 88 kilometres (55 mi) east of Roy Hill and 108 kilometres (67 mi) southeast of Nullagine in the Pilbara region of Western Australia. At 6,395 square kilometres (2,469 sq mi), it is among the largest cattle stations in Australia.

== Description ==
The station occupies an area of 639,484 hectares (1,580,199 acres) and over 25,000 Zebu cattle graze on the plains. The herd is predominantly Polled Red Brahman with 15,000 breeding females, producing 8,000 steers (males) and heifers (females) annually, most of which are exported to the Middle East and Asia. The mineral-rich grazing country includes extensive watercourse and channel country, opening onto large floodplains covered with Mitchell, Flinders, and buffel grass.

The property boasts 35 new ring dams with over 15,000 cubic metres (529,720 cu ft) of water storage. The property was estimated in value of between $15 and 20 million (Australian dollars) in 2012. Due to the vast size of the property, R22 Beta helicopters are used to muster the animals.

The Talawana Track passes through Balfour Downs, connecting it to the indigenous Australian community of Jigalong, roughly 60 kilometres (37 mi) to the south and Karlamilyi National Park, roughly 140 kilometres (87 mi) to the east.

== History ==
Babburain is recorded in 1910 by Daisy Bate's informants as the Aboriginal name for the area on the Oakover river that Balfour Downs Station takes in.

Management of the station was taken over in 1910 by Mr. A. H. Crofton, who represented the firm of Broadhurst, McNeil and Company. Crofton had previously managed Pyramid Station.

The station had great rains in 1913 causing the Oakover River to run over its banks; at the time the station was co-owned by Mr. Crofton.

In 1915 an Aboriginal man named Darby from the Oakover River taking in Balfour Downs Station died at Mundiwindi telegraph station and was buried at Savory Creek, leaving behind two Aboriginal children, known as the Darby sisters. In 1917 the girls were forcibly removed from Balfour Downs and placed into the care of the McDonald family of Nullagine then moved onto the Moore River Native Settlement.

An Aboriginal man known as Big Bob was murdered on the station by the drover Charles Park in 1915. Park's death sentence was later commuted to five years for good behaviour and he was released in 1921.

Doris Pilkington Garimara, the author of Follow the Rabbit-Proof Fence, was born on the station in 1937 and was forcibly removed with her mother four years later to the Moore River settlement.

Neighbouring stations, such as Ethel Creek Station, were connected to Balfour Downs via the bush telephone. Balfour also had a pedal-powered wireless radio transmitter which was able to communicate as far away as Port Hedland.

William Dunnett, a part owner of the station, died in 1948. He had resided in the area since 1918.

Cattle from the station were often taken overland to Meekatharra then trucked to the yards at Midland junction. 13 bogies (about 600 head) of cattle were sent in 1929, 180 in 1932, 80 in 1938, another 600 cattle were dispatched in 1939, and another 700 in 1949.

The lessee in 2010 was Enipend Pty. Ltd. under the management of Donald Hoar. The Hoar family owned the station from some time before 2005 to 2012. Balfour Downs is operating under the Crown Lease numbers CL110-1970 and CL136-1989 and has the Land Act numbers LA3114/977 and LA398/804.

Hoar sold Balfour Downs to Xingfa Ma for approximately A$18 million in 2014. Ma is a wealthy Chinese businessman who owns Ferngrove Wine Group based in the Great Southern region of Western Australia and Emu Downs Station.

In February 2022, Harvest Road acquired Balfour Downs from Ma.

== See also ==
- List of pastoral leases in Western Australia
