= Film Finance Corporation Australia =

Former Australian government company

Agency overview
- Formed: May 1988
- Dissolved: July 2008
- Superseding agency: Screen Australia
- Jurisdiction: Australian Government

The Film Finance Corporation Australia (FFC) was the government agency responsible for funding commercial productions of Australian film, documentary, and television from 1988 to 2008. Unlike other publicly funded organisations responsible for financing media production in Australia, the FFC operated as a commercially oriented funding agency, backing projects with the intention of recouping part of its funding through investment. The organisation was responsible for financing several notable Australian feature films, among them Strictly Ballroom (1992), Muriel's Wedding (1994) and The Adventures of Priscilla, Queen of the Desert (1994). During its lifetime, the FFC supported 248 features with a total investment of A$662 million. In 2008, the FFC was succeeded by Screen Australia, which merged the similar film financing bodies operated by the Australian government.

== History ==
The Film Finance Corporation was established in May 1988 by the Australian Government under prime minister Bob Hawke, with the organisation beginning operations in the following financial year. Its inaugural chairman was Kim Williams. The FFC emerged as an alternative source of support for the film industry to the then existent Australian Film Commission (AFC) and the 10BA tax concession. It centralised government support for the Australian film industry, becoming the main source of film and television funding in the years immediately after its inception. The role of the AFC was diverted to focus on personnel and script development for culturally significant productions. Instead, the FFC was conceived as a 'film bank' with then treasurer Paul Keating acknowledging the notion that the organisation might become self-funding. The guiding principles for what the FFC decided to fund was driven by the market in that projects required financial commitments from distributors or sales agents to secure funding. Thus, projects were largely dictated by the market.

== Film and media contributions ==
Academy awards for FFC financed films
Year	Award	Film	Recipient(s)
1994	Best Costume Design	The Adventures of Priscilla, Queen of the Desert	Lizzie Gardiner and Tim Chappel
1996	Best Performance by an Actor in a Leading Role	Shine	Geoffrey Rush

FFC financed films which have screened at Cannes Film Festival
Year	Title	Director	Selection	Award Won at Cannes
1992	Strictly Ballroom	Baz Luhrmann	Un Certain Regard	Prix de La Jeunesse
1993	Frauds	Stephan Elliott	In Competition	n/a
1993	Bedevil	Tracey Moffat	Un Certain Regard	n/a
1994	The Adventures of Priscilla, Queen of the Desert	Stephan Elliott	Un Certain Regard	Prix du Publique
1996	Love Serenade	Shirley Barrett	Un Certain Regard	Camera d'Or
1997	The Well	Samantha Lang	In Competition	n/a
1999	Siam Sunset	John Polson	International Critics' Week Feature Film Competition	Rail d'Or
2003	Japanese Story	Sue Brooks	Un Certain Regard	n/a

Successful feature films funded by the FFC include the drama film Rabbit-Proof Fence, an adaptation of Doris Pilkington Garimara's novel Follow the Rabbit-Proof Fence about three Indigenous Australian girls' experiences as part of the Stolen Generations. It is one of many other notable FFC financed productions spotlighting indigenous stories and culture in Australian film. Other notable novel adaptations include the crime drama Chopper about the celebrity criminal Mark “Chopper” Read which adapts his autobiographies, and the television film On the Beach, adapting Nevil Shute's novel of the same name. One financially successful original production is the low-budget horror film Wolf Creek.

In addition to financing feature films, the FFC funded Australian children's television drama productions. Australian commercial broadcasters were required to broadcast a certain number of publicly funded children's programming. The FFC alongside the Australian Film Commission, the Australian Children's Television Foundation, and the public broadcasters the ABC and SBS, were among the major sources financing these mandated acquisitions. Between 1995-96 and 1999-2000 the FFC funded 20 out of 52 children's drama programs, contributing approximately a third of their finances. Between 2000 and 2003 the FFC funded 15 out of 33 programs. Notable titles include the fantasy teen drama H_{2}O: Just Add Water, the fantasy adventure Spellbinder and its sequel Spellbinder: Land of the Dragon which were both international co-productions with Poland, and the science fiction series Wicked Science.

The FFC also financed the production of documentaries through a program with Film Australia and the ABC. Between 1990 and 2004, the ABC was annually mandated to pre-purchase up to 24 hours of independently produced programs which would be mediated through an FFC funding mechanism. Laughren notes that FFC financed documentaries were often successful in international markets and often won awards. The documentary Not Quite Hollywood: The Wild, Untold Story of Ozploitation! about the history of Australian exploitation B-movies from the 1970s to the 1980s was awarded the Best Feature Length Documentary by the Australian Academy of Cinema and Television Arts and Best Documentary by the Australian Film Critics Association.

== Production and financing ==
=== Financing by the FFC ===
Between 2004 and June 2007, the FFC streamlined its financing policies by implementing their “two-door” system for Australian producers seeking funding. The first “door” referred to projects that had already secured financing from non-government or private sources above one-quarter of their budget were eligible for automatic funding provided by the FFC of up 45% of their budget. Such projects were termed “Marketplace” films. The second “door” referred to as “Evaluation” films required a commitment from the market, either financial or nonfinancial, such as a commitment by a theatrical distributor to release the film, and also required passing an evaluation by an internal committee. Such films were provided possibly larger funding by the FFC. Although there was little difference between the box office performances of “Marketplace” and “Evaluation” films, “Evaluation” films tend to screen at significant global film festivals.

=== Federal Government Support ===
From 1988 to 1994, a total of A$337.7 million of federal government support was provided to productions through the FFC. By then, the FFC's recoups on the invests were 36% for films, 35% for television drama, 25% for co-productions and 6.5-10% for documentaries.

The international success of Strictly Ballroom was responsible for driving the revenue of the FFC from A$8.05 million in the 1989/90 financial year to $18.3 million in the 1992/93. Although the FFC had not fulfilled a “promise” to be self-funding within three years of its inception, Paul Keating used it as an example in his campaign to maintain the status quo for government financing.

== International activity ==
From 1997 onward, the international marketplace became a more significant financier for Australian films, the FFC in particular growing connections to international sales agents. Australian children's television drama in particular saw an increase in foreign financing, making up 33% of the total budget matching the commitment by the FFC. In 1999-2000 financial year, feature films funded by the FFC had contributions of 20% of their cost, 64% came from private investors overseas with the remaining among contributed by private Australian investors. The FFC in fact received 79% of its total recoupment from overseas markets.

== Dissolution ==
The passing of the Screen Australia Act 2008 in the commonwealth means that from 1 July 2008 the FFC merged with the adjacent Australian Film Commission and Film Australia Limited into a single body, Screen Australia. This unified the FFC's core financing principles for commercial productions with the AFC's role in script and profession development and Film Australia's role commissioning productions under the National Interest Program.
