= Daisy Kadibil =

Aboriginal Australian woman (1923–2018)

- Daisy Kadibil, undated photo
- Born: Daisy Burungu; 1923; Australia
- Died: 30 March 2018 (aged 94–95); Port Hedland, Western Australia, Australia
- Known for: Inspiration for the novel Follow the Rabbit-Proof Fence and its film adaptation Rabbit-Proof Fence
- Family: Doris Pilkington Garimara (niece); Molly Craig (sister); Gracie (cousin)
- Awards: Deadly Annomination Award (1995)

Daisy Kadibil (née Burungu; 1923 – 30 March 2018) was an Aboriginal Australian woman whose experiences shaped the 1996 book Follow the Rabbit-Proof Fence, written by her niece Doris Pilkington Garimara and the subsequent 2002 film Rabbit-Proof Fence.

Kadibil was a member of the Stolen Generations, who were Aboriginal children forcibly removed from their families by the Australian government.

== Early life ==
Kadibil was born in 1923. Her mother was of the Martu people and her father Thomas Craig was of English descent, making her "half-caste" in the eyes of the Australian government. In 1931 when Kadibil was about 8 years old, she was removed from her family in the Jigalong Community by the Australian government and sent to the Moore River Native Settlement.

Her sister Molly Craig and cousin Gracie, whose mother was Daisy's aunt, were also taken from home and sent to Moore River as well. Daisy and Molly shared a father, Thomas Craig, making them both half-sisters and cousins.

The girls stayed only one night in the internment camp before making their escape to travel home. Estimates of their journey range from 800–1,000 mi (1,300–1,600 km) long. The trip took the girls 8 weeks to complete; they used Australia's rabbit-proof fence as a guide to travel north. The journey home was difficult, as the girls had to sleep under bushes or in rabbit burrows. Molly carried each of the younger girls in turn as they evaded search parties sent out by A. O. Neville; they also found their own food. Farmers and hunters aided the girls by giving them food as well.

== Book based on her experiences ==
Kadibil's niece Doris Pilkington Garimara, who was Molly's daughter, authored Follow the Rabbit-Proof Fence, which was published in 1996. Doris had also been sent to the Moore River internment camp, and was not reunited with her mother Molly for 20 years.

== Later life, legacy and death ==
After winning the Deadly Annomination Award in 1995 for her community work and abilities, Kadibil worked as a housekeeper and cook on stations in the Pilbara of Western Australia. She married and had four children. She had children in Wiluna, Western Australia, then returned to Jigalong. Members of her family established and still head the Parnngurr Community.

She died in a nursing home in South Hedland, Western Australia on 30 March 2018.

== See also ==
- Follow the Rabbit-Proof Fence (book inspired by her experience)
- Rabbit-Proof Fence (film based on the above book)
