= List of homesteads in Western Australia: B =

This list includes all homesteads in Western Australia with a gazetted name. It is complete with respect to the 1996 Gazetteer of Australia. Dubious names have been checked against the online 2004 data, and in all cases confirmed correct. However, if any homesteads have been gazetted or deleted since 1996, this list does not reflect these changes. Strictly speaking, Australian place names are gazetted in capital letters only; the names in this list have been converted to mixed case in accordance with normal capitalisation conventions.

Name	Location	Remarks
Bacchus Creek	33°57′S 117°7′E	
Badgebup	33°38′S 117°53′E	
Badgingara	30°24′S 115°34′E	
Badja	28°36′S 116°47′E	
Baillee Farm	31°38′S 116°33′E	
Bakaara	33°36′S 122°3′E	
Balafield	33°31′S 116°41′E	
Balanada	33°29′S 121°53′E	
Balance Lea	33°43′S 115°47′E	
Balbalingup	34°12′S 117°4′E	
Bald Hill	31°35′S 116°56′E	
Bald Hill	33°18′S 116°13′E	
Bald Rock	32°44′S 117°6′E	
Balfour Downs	33°47′S 118°46′E	
Balfour Downs	22°48′S 120°52′E	
Balfron	33°43′S 121°37′E	
Balgair	31°5′S 125°40′E	
Balgar Plains	30°45′S 115°33′E	
Balgarup	31°2′S 115°27′E	
Balgarup	33°57′S 117°12′E	
Balgaweena	28°57′S 115°1′E	
Balgowan	34°20′S 117°29′E	
Balgownie	34°2′S 117°5′E	
Baligah Kia	33°53′S 115°10′E	
Balijup	34°25′S 117°28′E	
Balingdale	34°24′S 118°58′E	
Balladonia	32°28′S 123°52′E	
Ballaging Rock	33°21′S 117°35′E	
Ballardon	32°22′S 116°33′E	
Ballians	33°34′S 121°42′E	
Ballinard	34°18′S 119°6′E	
Ballochmyle	34°20′S 117°31′E	
Ballythunna	26°4′S 115°40′E	
Balmain	32°32′S 117°26′E	
Balmoral	21°10′S 116°7′E	
Balowen	34°18′S 117°39′E	
Bambili	32°22′S 117°36′E	
Bamboo Springs	22°3′S 119°38′E	
Ban-y-gloe	33°55′S 115°10′E	
Banachie	34°15′S 116°52′E	
Bandin	30°57′S 116°30′E	
Bando	33°37′S 115°59′E	
Bandya	27°42′S 122°8′E	
Banella Park	30°30′S 116°9′E	
Bangalla	33°39′S 121°31′E	
Bangalup	34°28′S 116°55′E	
Bangor	33°1′S 119°46′E	
Banjawarn	27°42′S 121°37′E	
Bannister Downs	32°43′S 116°30′E	
Banstead	33°15′S 116°16′E	
Bar Twenty	33°29′S 119°13′E	
Baramba	31°5′S 115°30′E	
Barara	30°1′S 115°12′E	
Barara	29°59′S 115°11′E	
Baratooka	33°34′S 120°42′E	
Barbabilling	32°37′S 118°9′E	
Barbados Valley	31°19′S 115°35′E	
Barclay	32°27′S 118°1′E	
Bardeen	31°35′S 116°36′E	
Bardfield	33°49′S 115°2′E	
Bareena	29°37′S 115°24′E	
Bareki	29°27′S 116°31′E	
Barina North	33°32′S 119°29′E	
Baringup	34°43′S 117°48′E	
Barkala	33°17′S 116°41′E	
Barlina	34°45′S 117°26′E	
Barn Hill Outstation	18°22′S 122°2′E	
Barnard	33°57′S 116°30′E	
Barnong	28°38′S 116°17′E	
Baronia Glen	33°17′S 116°8′E	
Barooga	33°10′S 116°48′E	
Baroona	33°40′S 120°56′E	
Baroona Farm	33°31′S 122°8′E	
Barossa	32°1′S 118°28′E	
Barra	29°44′S 115°24′E	
Barrabarrup	33°35′S 117°53′E	
Barrabiddy	34°12′S 118°56′E	
Barracup	34°11′S 117°46′E	
Barrambie	27°31′S 119°11′E	
Barraminning	33°10′S 116°48′E	
Barrule	33°55′S 117°17′E	
Barton Plains	14°16′S 126°54′E	
Barunah	31°19′S 115°44′E	
Barunga	34°2′S 118°25′E	
Barweena	33°11′S 115°48′E	
Barwidgee	27°2′S 120°55′E	
Basildene	33°57′S 115°3′E	
Batalling	33°20′S 116°35′E	
Batemans	29°28′S 115°53′E	
Battunga	33°17′S 121°25′E	
Bay Laurel	33°49′S 115°57′E	
Bayfield	33°41′S 115°4′E	
Bayou	33°37′S 122°21′E	
Bayview	33°34′S 115°4′E	
Beachborough	33°35′S 115°27′E	
Beal Outstation	26°19′S 126°56′E	
Bealing	33°35′S 116°41′E	
Beambine Park	33°37′S 117°51′E	
Beaming Hill	32°15′S 116°54′E	
Beaming Hill	34°20′S 118°45′E	
Beau Vista	33°27′S 115°52′E	
Beauflat	33°34′S 117°5′E	
Beaufort	33°35′S 117°6′E	
Beaufort Plains	34°23′S 118°49′E	
Beauly	31°20′S 115°52′E	
Beaumont West	34°28′S 118°27′E	
Beckon	34°40′S 118°19′E	
Beckwith	33°34′S 117°14′E	
Bedford Downs	17°16′S 127°28′E	
Bedford Harbour	33°48′S 120°38′E	
Bedford Harbour Station	33°47′S 120°45′E	
Bedford Meadows	32°24′S 116°46′E	
Beebyn	26°58′S 117°54′E	
Beech Banks	34°27′S 117°29′E	
Beechdale	33°35′S 118°41′E	
Beefwood Outcamp	24°57′S 119°25′E	
Beermullah	31°12′S 115°47′E	
Beethan Outcamp	26°48′S 113°45′E	
Beetloo	29°44′S 116°9′E	
Behn Ord	33°13′S 117°37′E	
Bejenup	33°58′S 117°47′E	
Belair	31°24′S 116°54′E	
Belele	26°22′S 118°2′E	
Belgrove	31°31′S 116°43′E	
Belhus	32°11′S 116°51′E	
Bell View	33°25′S 117°25′E	
Bella Vista	34°49′S 117°54′E	
Bellavista	34°13′S 117°42′E	
Belleair	34°42′S 117°46′E	
Belleranga	29°20′S 115°53′E	
Bellevue	33°13′S 115°43′E	
Bellevue	33°36′S 117°25′E	
Bellevue Hill	33°56′S 117°39′E	
Bellmans	33°10′S 119°10′E	
Bellview	34°1′S 115°6′E	
Bellware	33°40′S 117°18′E	
Belmont	33°44′S 117°37′E	
Belmont	33°38′S 117°26′E	
Belmont Park	33°17′S 117°23′E	
Belora	32°26′S 118°16′E	
Beltana	33°45′S 121°12′E	
Belvidere	33°14′S 115°41′E	
Belview Downs	33°42′S 121°29′E	
Belvoir	33°33′S 117°32′E	
Belvoir	29°41′S 116°6′E	
Bemersyde	33°41′S 121°59′E	
Ben Haven	34°57′S 117°59′E	
Benalla	34°9′S 117°24′E	
Benalta	32°54′S 117°15′E	
Bencullen	32°35′S 116°32′E	
Bendy Creek	34°36′S 117°55′E	
Benelong	33°22′S 120°44′E	
Bensfield	32°32′S 117°1′E	
Bensure	34°19′S 118°50′E	
Bentrakel	31°43′S 116°30′E	
Beralya	33°0′S 116°57′E	
Beringarra	26°2′S 116°57′E	
Bernama Park	33°35′S 115°38′E	
Berry Brow	31°49′S 116°32′E	
Betane Stud	33°55′S 115°16′E	
Beulah	33°33′S 119°59′E	
Beulah	34°33′S 118°33′E	
Beverley Hills	33°44′S 117°18′E	
Beverley Springs	16°43′S 125°28′E	
Beyondie	24°47′S 120°2′E	
Bibarrd Aboriginal Outstation	21°58′S 127°43′E	
Biberkine	32°35′S 116°57′E	
Bibiking	33°29′S 117°43′E	
Bibilup	33°56′S 115°45′E	
Bidaminna	31°8′S 115°34′E	
Biddy Giddy Outcamp	26°20′S 113°23′E	
Bidgemia	25°3′S 115°18′E	
Bidgerabbie	30°49′S 115°47′E	
Bidgerabbie West	30°49′S 115°46′E	
Biernfels	30°7′S 116°59′E	
Big Hill	33°14′S 118°38′E	
Big Springs	31°6′S 116°37′E	
Big Valley	33°59′S 115°9′E	
Bilga	33°27′S 119°33′E	
Bilinga	33°13′S 115°44′E	
Billa Falls	30°15′S 116°31′E	
Billabalong	27°25′S 115°50′E	
Billabong	34°7′S 117°27′E	
Billellen	29°58′S 116°43′E	
Billeroo	29°44′S 116°1′E	
Billeroy	32°44′S 117°20′E	
Billignuru	17°55′S 122°13′E	
Billiluna	19°33′S 127°40′E	
Billinnooka	23°2′S 120°53′E	
Bills Gully	33°58′S 116°15′E	
Bilney Springs	33°48′S 118°41′E	
Bimbadean	32°23′S 117°15′E	
Bimbadeen	33°20′S 118°29′E	
Bimbijy	29°42′S 118°2′E	
Binaburra	35°1′S 117°38′E	
Binalong	34°17′S 118°32′E	
Binberoo	31°59′S 116°43′E	
Binbrook	34°1′S 119°3′E	
Bindar	31°20′S 116°9′E	
Bindaree	33°43′S 116°32′E	
Bindaree	33°46′S 115°18′E	
Bindaree	29°15′S 114°57′E	
Bindene	33°14′S 121°32′E	
Binderrie	29°31′S 115°51′E	
Bingarra	33°14′S 116°48′E	
Bingarra	33°46′S 116°17′E	
Bingleburra	31°28′S 116°5′E	
Binnack	33°1′S 116°46′E	
Binneringie	31°34′S 122°6′E	
Binthalya	24°41′S 114°50′E	
Birahlee	31°19′S 116°22′E	
Birchfields	33°41′S 115°15′E	
Birchmont	32°43′S 115°42′E	
Bird Farm	33°30′S 115°47′E	
Birdwood	33°41′S 117°15′E	
Birkby	33°44′S 117°36′E	
Birkdale	33°10′S 118°28′E	
Birnam Wood	33°56′S 117°42′E	
Biron Creek	32°42′S 117°39′E	
Birrong Park	31°20′S 115°45′E	
Bishops Road Farm	33°16′S 121°32′E	
Bissett Outcamp	28°54′S 120°38′E	
Black Cat Creek	34°58′S 118°4′E	
Black Flag	30°33′S 121°14′E	
Black Gin	34°36′S 118°33′E	
Black Hill	28°4′S 119°33′E	
Black Range	27°55′S 119°12′E	
Black Rock	33°44′S 117°14′E	
Black Wattle	33°26′S 116°41′E	
Blackboy Hill	34°33′S 118°38′E	
Blackburn	32°1′S 117°4′E	
Blackburn	29°45′S 116°28′E	
Blackrock	33°42′S 115°13′E	
Blackwattle Farm	33°39′S 115°34′E	
Blackwood	33°52′S 116°22′E	
Blackwood Bend	33°58′S 116°20′E	
Blairnairn	34°31′S 117°2′E	
Blantyre	30°34′S 116°6′E	
Blina	17°45′S 124°31′E	
Bloomfield	33°14′S 116°47′E	
Bloomfield	33°50′S 117°36′E	
Blue Hills	34°7′S 118°21′E	
Blue Hills	34°28′S 117°43′E	
Blue Lookout	32°51′S 117°57′E	
Blue Range	34°13′S 117°51′E	
Blue Waters	33°49′S 120°53′E	
Bluff Creek	34°49′S 118°23′E	
Blumanns	33°41′S 121°53′E	
Blundell	33°39′S 115°26′E	
Boathaugh	34°10′S 115°11′E	
Bobbymia	23°44′S 120°50′E	
Bobs Place	33°14′S 119°8′E	
Boddadong	30°59′S 116°19′E	
Boerendale	34°13′S 119°2′E	
Bogadi Outcamp	25°53′S 115°46′E	
Bogaduk	32°26′S 118°24′E	
Boglands	31°46′S 116°55′E	
Bokhara	33°29′S 116°27′E	
Bolganup	34°39′S 117°53′E	
Bolghinup	34°30′S 115°45′E	
Bolinda	29°9′S 115°26′E	
Bolton Pools	33°15′S 116°19′E	
Bon View	33°22′S 117°34′E	
Bon Vista	34°16′S 117°33′E	
Bon-accord	34°57′S 117°55′E	
Bondfield	33°47′S 116°19′E	
Bonita	31°39′S 116°2′E	
Bonney Downs	22°11′S 119°56′E	
Bonnie Doon	32°20′S 117°41′E	
Bonniedoon	33°53′S 117°59′E	
Bonniefield	29°13′S 114°56′E	
Bonshaw	34°11′S 117°19′E	
Bonvue	32°8′S 118°23′E	
Booanya	32°46′S 123°36′E	
Boobabbie	31°20′S 115°33′E	
Boodallia Outstation	25°11′S 113°54′E	
Boodanoo	28°44′S 118°16′E	
Boodarie	20°25′S 118°28′E	
Boodjidup	34°1′S 115°2′E	
Boodjidup Brook	34°1′S 115°2′E	
Boogardie	28°2′S 117°40′E	
Booiyana	29°39′S 115°27′E	
Book Book	34°32′S 118°7′E	
Bookara	29°4′S 114°52′E	
Bookarginner Outcamp	21°13′S 117°23′E	
Bookine Bookine	31°19′S 115°39′E	
Boolagh	33°57′S 116°15′E	
Boolaloo	22°35′S 115°52′E	
Boolardy	26°59′S 116°32′E	
Boolarong	33°30′S 117°10′E	
Boolarong	34°44′S 118°13′E	
Boolaroo	29°54′S 115°25′E	
Boolathana Station	24°39′S 113°42′E	
Booleroo	33°59′S 118°30′E	
Boologooro	24°20′S 114°2′E	
Booloo	32°54′S 117°36′E	
Boomaroo	33°33′S 119°34′E	
Boonari	33°41′S 122°32′E	
Boongadoo Hall	33°29′S 118°1′E	
Boongarra	33°55′S 118°0′E	
Booninning	33°26′S 116°49′E	
Boonmull	31°57′S 117°0′E	
Boonoke	33°57′S 118°50′E	
Boorala Outcamp	23°57′S 114°5′E	
Boorambee Farms	29°36′S 115°19′E	
Boorammon	31°42′S 116°48′E	
Boorlanup	33°12′S 116°51′E	
Booylgoo Spring	27°45′S 119°54′E	
Borachie	34°15′S 117°7′E	
Boranup Community	34°6′S 115°4′E	
Boranup Downs	34°8′S 115°6′E	
Borderdale	34°2′S 117°26′E	
Bore Outcamp	25°37′S 112°57′E	
Boree Park	33°45′S 116°35′E	
Borung	33°31′S 117°48′E	
Botherling	31°9′S 116°48′E	
Boucowie Downs	33°12′S 121°27′E	
Bounty	33°8′S 119°42′E	
Bow Park	31°18′S 116°7′E	
Bow River	16°52′S 128°11′E	
Bowhill	29°41′S 115°55′E	
Bown Farm	33°39′S 117°1′E	
Bowoka	33°53′S 118°6′E	
Boyadine	32°16′S 116°47′E	
Boyagarra	32°16′S 117°10′E	
Boyagin Valley	32°25′S 116°53′E	
Boyalling	33°24′S 117°6′E	
Boyaminning	33°35′S 117°23′E	
Boyaning	32°3′S 116°43′E	
Boyd Nook	31°28′S 116°28′E	
Boyup Park	33°49′S 116°22′E	
Bracken Dale	33°52′S 115°59′E	
Brackleigh	34°48′S 118°0′E	
Bradstock Hills	34°43′S 118°23′E	
Braebrook	34°2′S 115°7′E	
Braeburn	33°52′S 118°0′E	
Braedawn	34°29′S 116°58′E	
Braefield	32°58′S 117°2′E	
Braemar	32°24′S 117°31′E	
Braeside	32°1′S 116°40′E	
Braeside	33°16′S 115°48′E	
Braeside	21°12′S 121°0′E	
Braeside	31°32′S 116°24′E	
Braeside	33°52′S 117°3′E	
Braeside	33°50′S 118°51′E	
Braeside Estate	29°50′S 116°14′E	
Brambledale	33°24′S 117°10′E	
Brambley	32°43′S 117°27′E	
Brambre	33°37′S 117°48′E	
Bramdon Park	33°29′S 115°51′E	
Bramfield	34°36′S 117°43′E	
Bramleigh	33°21′S 115°43′E	
Bramley	29°11′S 115°23′E	
Brampton Park	33°28′S 115°49′E	
Brampton Springs	33°28′S 115°51′E	
Brancaster	33°54′S 116°34′E	
Brandon	33°52′S 115°6′E	
Branji	32°27′S 117°59′E	
Brantwood	33°43′S 116°36′E	
Brayton	33°54′S 117°43′E	
Breakaway	34°16′S 118°37′E	
Brecon	33°42′S 121°34′E	
Brenco	33°34′S 121°45′E	
Brenton	34°46′S 117°23′E	
Brentwood	33°15′S 115°48′E	
Brentwood	33°18′S 117°7′E	
Brewarrina	31°39′S 116°21′E	
Brianti	34°54′S 117°44′E	
Briardale	32°15′S 116°57′E	
Briarleigh	33°38′S 117°57′E	
Brick House	24°49′S 113°47′E	
Bridgelea	33°15′S 116°54′E	
Bridleface	25°48′S 120°37′E	
Bridleface Outcamp	25°49′S 120°37′E	
Bridstowe	34°59′S 118°2′E	
Brig House	32°10′S 117°28′E	
Brigadoon	33°35′S 122°4′E	
Brigadoon	34°44′S 117°46′E	
Brixton	31°41′S 116°44′E	
Broad Acres	32°24′S 117°31′E	
Broadacres	33°24′S 118°32′E	
Broadlands	31°56′S 116°37′E	
Broadvale	34°0′S 115°3′E	
Broadview	32°16′S 117°3′E	
Broadview	29°49′S 116°6′E	
Broadwater	33°40′S 115°18′E	
Broadway	33°43′S 117°32′E	
Brockdale	34°50′S 117°57′E	
Brockham	33°9′S 118°28′E	
Brocklesby	33°37′S 117°25′E	
Brockside	32°39′S 116°42′E	
Bronco Outcamp	24°15′S 118°28′E	
Brook Field	31°19′S 115°42′E	
Brookbank	34°57′S 117°29′E	
Brookdale	33°53′S 117°53′E	
Brookdale Farm	34°37′S 117°26′E	
Brookfield	33°19′S 118°35′E	
Brookford	32°24′S 116°59′E	
Brookhampton	33°36′S 115°52′E	
Brooking Springs	18°7′S 125°38′E	
Brooklands	31°40′S 116°51′E	
Brooklands	34°0′S 117°27′E	
Brooklands	33°48′S 115°57′E	
Brooklands	31°21′S 116°8′E	
Brooklands	31°33′S 116°50′E	
Brooklands	32°26′S 117°24′E	
Brooklands	32°19′S 116°57′E	
Brooklands	32°56′S 117°42′E	
Brooklands	32°49′S 116°50′E	
Brooklane	33°28′S 115°49′E	
Brooklyn	34°58′S 116°28′E	
Brooklyn	33°46′S 117°8′E	
Brooklyn Farm	32°44′S 117°0′E	
Brooklyn Park	34°57′S 117°18′E	
Brookside	31°44′S 116°38′E	
Brookside	33°21′S 116°48′E	
Brookside	33°10′S 115°52′E	
Brookview	33°36′S 115°53′E	
Brookview Farm	31°22′S 115°55′E	
Brookville	33°13′S 117°46′E	
Broome Farm	33°51′S 117°15′E	
Brownelea	32°57′S 116°41′E	
Browns Cottage	31°29′S 116°32′E	
Bryah	25°31′S 118°48′E	
Bryalana	31°23′S 115°51′E	
Bryn Avon	34°58′S 117°28′E	
Bryzel Estate	34°38′S 117°59′E	
Bubbaweedarra	25°26′S 115°34′E	
Buckland	31°34′S 116°37′E	
Buckland Farm	31°54′S 116°59′E	
Budjarra	31°0′S 115°56′E	
Buelah	33°47′S 117°46′E	
Buffalo	34°46′S 117°38′E	
Buffy Downs	33°5′S 116°48′E	
Bukari	33°39′S 115°25′E	
Bulga Downs	28°30′S 119°44′E	
Bulgamurra	30°36′S 115°38′E	
Bulla-bulla	30°52′S 115°49′E	
Bullara	22°41′S 114°2′E	
Bullara Outcamp	27°30′S 117°19′E	
Bullardoo	27°51′S 115°40′E	
Bullock Hills	33°26′S 117°44′E	
Bulloo Downs	24°0′S 119°33′E	
Bullsroar	33°12′S 118°36′E	
Bulvan	33°44′S 118°26′E	
Bundababba Outcamp	25°12′S 115°40′E	
Bundaleer	34°30′S 116°57′E	
Bundaleer	29°20′S 115°26′E	
Bundara	33°30′S 119°40′E	
Bundarlee	34°44′S 118°9′E	
Bundarra	28°19′S 121°11′E	
Bundilla	34°52′S 118°13′E	
Bungalup	34°20′S 117°35′E	
Bungaree	32°14′S 117°54′E	
Bungle Bungle Outcamp	17°20′S 128°21′E	
Bungoona	34°24′S 117°14′E	
Buninyong	33°51′S 120°46′E	
Bunnawarra	28°37′S 116°34′E	
Bunyip Pool	33°39′S 115°25′E	
Burando	33°19′S 119°21′E	
Burghfield	33°7′S 115°51′E	
Burks Park	18°15′S 127°42′E	
Burlands	33°52′S 117°25′E	
Burley	31°9′S 116°16′E	
Burley Vale	33°18′S 118°4′E	
Burmuda	33°51′S 117°28′E	
Burna Downs	33°11′S 119°0′E	
Burnbrae	33°38′S 118°27′E	
Burnerbinmah	28°47′S 117°22′E	
Burnside	34°30′S 117°47′E	
Burnside	33°39′S 115°55′E	
Burrabidgy	30°40′S 116°8′E	
Burradale	33°37′S 115°37′E	
Burrubunna	33°37′S 122°4′E	
Burville	35°2′S 117°45′E	
Bushlands	33°7′S 115°53′E	
Bushy Brook	31°20′S 115°50′E	
Byahmul	31°0′S 115°41′E	
Byllu	33°38′S 117°52′E	
Byrine Pool	33°24′S 116°32′E	
Byro	26°5′S 116°9′E	
Bythorne	33°23′S 115°47′E	

== See also ==
- List of pastoral leases in Western Australia
