= Molly Craig =

Australian Martu Aboriginal woman (died 2004)

Molly Kelly
- Born: Molly Craig c. 1916–1917; Jigalong, Western Australia
- Died: January 2004 (approximately 87); Jigalong, Western Australia
- Known for: Inspiration for novel Follow the Rabbit-Proof Fence and its film adaptation Rabbit-Proof Fence film
- Parent(s): Maude (Mother), Thomas Craig (father)
- Family: Doris Pilkington Garimara (daughter), Daisy Kadibil (half-sister)

Molly Kelly (née Craig, died January 2004) was an Australian Martu Aboriginal woman, known for her escape from the Moore River Native Settlement in 1931 and subsequent 1,600 km (990 mi) trek home with her half-sister Daisy Kadibil (née Burungu) and cousin Gracie Cross (née Fields). She was a member of the Stolen Generations, who were part-white, part-Aboriginal children forcibly removed from their families by the Australian government. Her story was the inspiration for the book Follow the Rabbit-Proof Fence written by her daughter Doris Pilkington Garimara and its 2002 film adaptation Rabbit-Proof Fence.

== Early life ==
Molly Craig was born in Jigalong, in the Pilbara Region of Western Australia, c. 1916–1917. Her mother, Maude, was a Martu Aboriginal woman, and her father was Thomas Craig, a white Australian fence inspector. The Martu people (Mardudjara) had moved from the nearby Sandy Desert. Jigalong was established in the far north west of Australia in 1907, as the location for a maintenance and rations store for workmen constructing the rabbit-proof fence. The original rabbit-proof fences were pest-exclusion fences constructed between 1902 and 1907 to keep rabbits and other agricultural pests from the east from entering Western Australia.

In the first part of the 20th century, children of mixed Indigenous and white parentage were frequently removed from their families and placed in institutions or with white families as domestic servants.

In 1931, Molly (probably 14), her half-sister Daisy Kadibil (aged about 8) and her cousin Gracie (aged about 11) were taken from their families and transported over 1,600 kilometres (990 mi) to the Moore River Native Settlement, north of Perth. The next day, the three girls escaped on foot, and walked to find the rabbit-proof fence and then follow it north back to Jigalong. Craig piggy-backed the younger girls in turn. The journey was described in the book Follow the Rabbit-Proof Fence by Molly's daughter Doris Pilkington Garimara. In 2002, the book was made into a film, Rabbit-Proof Fence, directed by Phillip Noyce.

== Later life ==
Craig married Toby Kelly, an Aboriginal stockman, and the couple worked on Balfour Downs station. She gave birth to her first daughter, Nugi Garimara (Doris), in 1936 under a mulga tree. In 1937, her second daughter Annabelle was born.

Molly Kelly was taken to the Moore River settlement again in 1940 with her daughters. She ran away in 1941, carrying 18-month-old Annabelle. She left Doris (4) with a relative. In 1943, Annabelle (Anna Wyld) was taken away from Kelly and told she was an orphan. She would never see her mother again, although they were able to exchange gifts before Kelly's death.

Doris was reunited with her mother 21 years later which led to her internationally acclaimed and award-winning trilogy, Caprice, A Stockman's Daughter, (UQP, 1991), Follow the Rabbit-Proof Fence, (UQP, 1996), and Under the Wintamarra Tree, (UQP, 2002). The children's edition of Follow the Rabbit-Proof Fence was Home to Mother, (UQP, 2006).

Kelly died in her sleep in January 2004, at Jigalong, Western Australia, at approximately 87 years old. (Note: Kelly's exact age was unknown; she was believed to be 87 when she died.)

== Bibliography ==
- Caprice, A Stockman's Daughter, (UQP, 1991) ISBN 0702224006
- Follow the Rabbit-Proof Fence, (UQP, 1996) ISBN 0702227099
- Under the Wintamarra Tree, (UQP, 2002) ISBN 0702233080
- Home to Mother, (UQP, 2006)
