= Mundiwindi, Western Australia =

Ghost town in Western Australia

Mundiwindi
- Town
- Coordinates: 23°48′S 120°14′E
- Country: Australia
- State: Western Australia
- LGA: Shire of Meekatharra
- Established: 1914

Government
  - State electorate: Pilbara
  - Federal division: Durack

Population
  - Total: 0 (Ghost town)
- Time zone: UTC+8 (AWST)
- Mean max temp: 30.6 °C (87.1 °F)
- Mean min temp: 15.0 °C (59.0 °F)
- Annual rainfall: 264.3 mm (10.41 in)

Mundiwindi is a ghost town in the Pilbara region of Western Australia. The town is around 1,150 kilometres (710 mi) north east of Perth and 124 kilometres (77 mi) south east of Newman, along the Jigalong Mission road.

The town was established in 1914 as a telegraph station. The station was closed in 1977. The telegraph station was a link on the Australian Overland Telegraph Line linking the settled regions of Australia to the submarine cable at Broome. A weather station operated at the site between 1915 and 1981.

The town housed employees of the Postmaster-General's Department responsible for the maintenance of the station, and their families. The only buildings on site were "the Post Office, an engine room, a trunkline equipment building, a pump house (good quality water came from a bore) and a line depot". The "town" was never a large one.

At the time [1964] the complete population of Mundiwindi comprised the Guthrie family [Tom, a Senior Technician, and his wife, and their children, Stephen, Sharon, Tommy and David], District Line Officer Fred Atkins and his wife, who was the Postmistress and Lineman Bill Wright and his wife and sixteen-month-old daughter, Michelle. Mr and Mrs Atkins had been three years at the old Mundiwindi Station which is about seven miles south, and three years at the present site.

— APO Magazine

In 1973 the town was hit by Tropical Cyclone Kerry, causing some damage to buildings.

The site is now deserted and the buildings are in ruins.
