= Jigalong Community, Western Australia =

Community in Western Australia

Jigalong
- Town
- Coordinates: 23°21′41″S 120°47′01″E
- Country: Australia
- State: Western Australia
- LGA(s): Shire of East Pilbara
- Location: 1,070 km (660 mi) NNE of Perth
- Established: 1907

Government
  - State electorate(s): Pilbara
  - Federal division(s): Durack

Area
  - Total: 111.6 km^{2} (43.1 sq mi)
- Elevation: 524 m (1,719 ft)

Population
  - Total(s): 289 (UCL 2021)

Jigalong is a remote Aboriginal community of approximately 333 people located in the Pilbara region of Western Australia. The traditional owners of the land are the Martu people.

== Location ==
Jigalong is in the Pilbara region of Western Australia, approximately 165 kilometres (103 mi) east of the town of Newman in the Shire of East Pilbara local government area. The community is located in an Aboriginal Lands Trust reserve on the western edge of the Little Sandy Desert. The traditional owners of the land are the Martu people, represented by the Western Desert Lands Aboriginal Corporation.

== Demographics and facilities ==
The 2016 Australian census recorded the population of Jigalong as 333 people, of whom 87% were Aboriginal.

The Jigalong Remote Community School provides education from kindergarten to Year 12 level, with six teachers for a student enrollment of around 120 children.

The community has a medical centre run by the Puntukurnu Aboriginal Medical Services. Patients with serious illnesses and injuries are usually flown to Port Hedland—400 kilometres (250 mi) north west of Jigalong—by the Royal Flying Doctor Service.

In 2019, the Army Aboriginal Community Assistance Program, a joint project between National Indigenous Australians Agency (formerly the Department of Prime Minister and Cabinet) and the Australian Army, commissioned the creation of a community-owned youth centre. They also facilitated the development of an outdoor barbecue setting, creek culvert, and public amenities block.

The community hosts a range of stakeholder facilities, including a BHP construction shed established by the mining company, and a women's centre run by Ashburton Aboriginal Corporation.

== History ==
Jigalong was established in 1907, as the location for a maintenance and rations store for workmen constructing the rabbit-proof fence. In the 1930s, it was used as a camel-breeding site, but this use was abandoned once the motor car superseded the camel as a mode of transport in the area.

In 1947, the land was granted to the Apostolic Church, which used it as a Christian mission. It developed the Aboriginal community.

The land was returned to the Australian government in 1969 as an Aboriginal reserve. It was granted to the Martu people in 1974.

== Native title ==
The community is covered by the registered Nyiyaparli Title claim (WC05/6).

== Town planning ==
Jigalong Layout Plan No.2 was prepared in accordance with State Planning Policy 3.2 Aboriginal Settlements. It was endorsed by the community in 2005 and the Western Australian Planning Commission in 2006.

== In popular culture ==
In the twentieth century, mixed-race Aboriginal children were often removed from their families and sent to distant camps, ostensibly for education and assimilation into European Australian life. Among them were sisters Molly Craig and Daisy of Jigalong, and their cousin Gracie. They were sent to the Moore River Native Settlement. Their escape from there, and the sisters' successful 1,600-kilometre (990 mi) trek back to Jigalong was described in the book Follow the Rabbit-Proof Fence, by Molly's daughter Doris Pilkington Garimara. She has written a trilogy about her family.

In 2002, Garimara's book was adapted as a film, Rabbit-Proof Fence, directed by Phillip Noyce. The film's world premiere was held in Jigalong. It received a positive reception for its portrayal of the Stolen Generations, as such children were called.
