= Darling Downs–Moreton Rabbit Board fence =

Pest-exclusion fence in Queensland, Australia

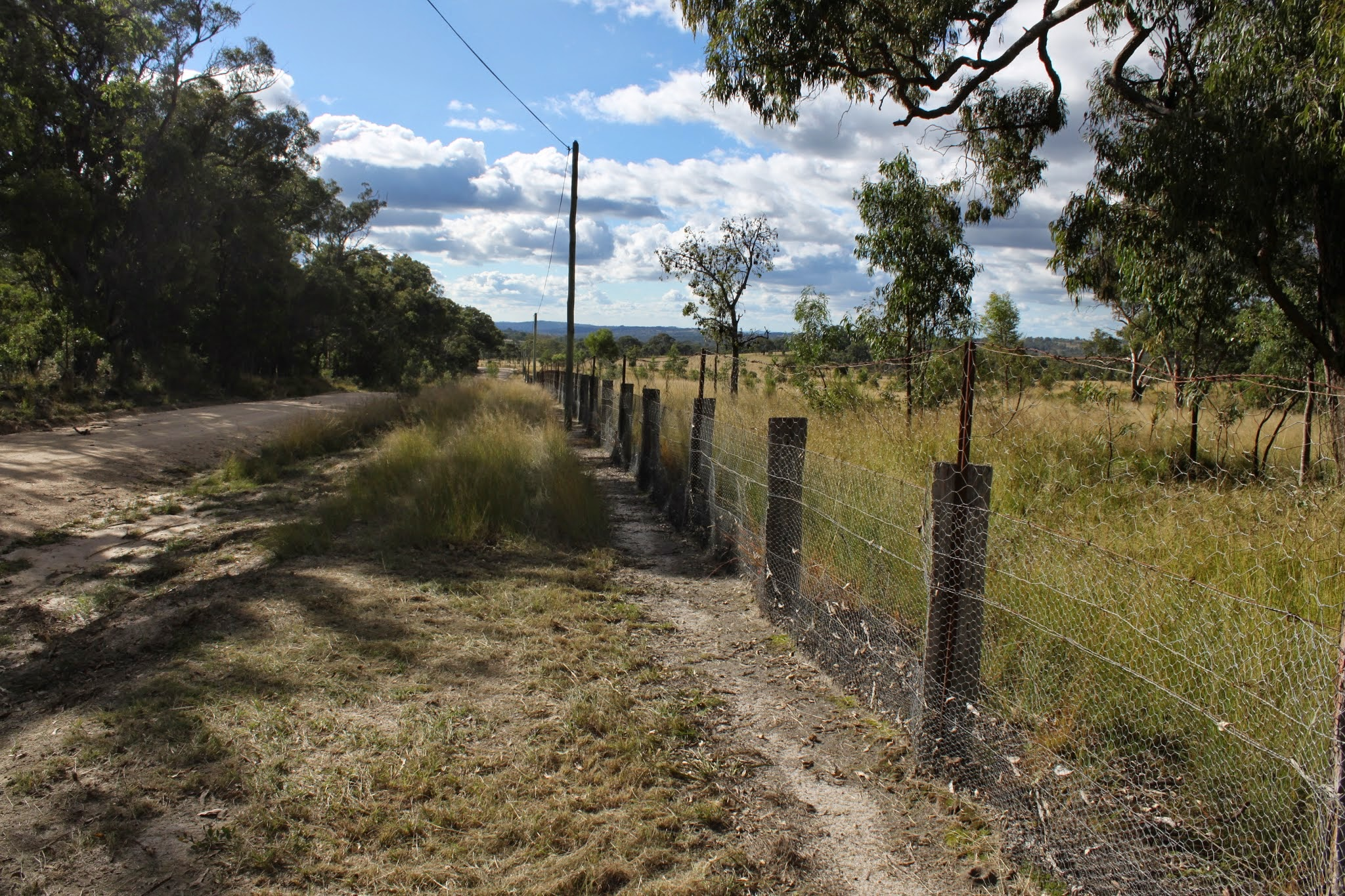
Looking along the Rabbit Fence

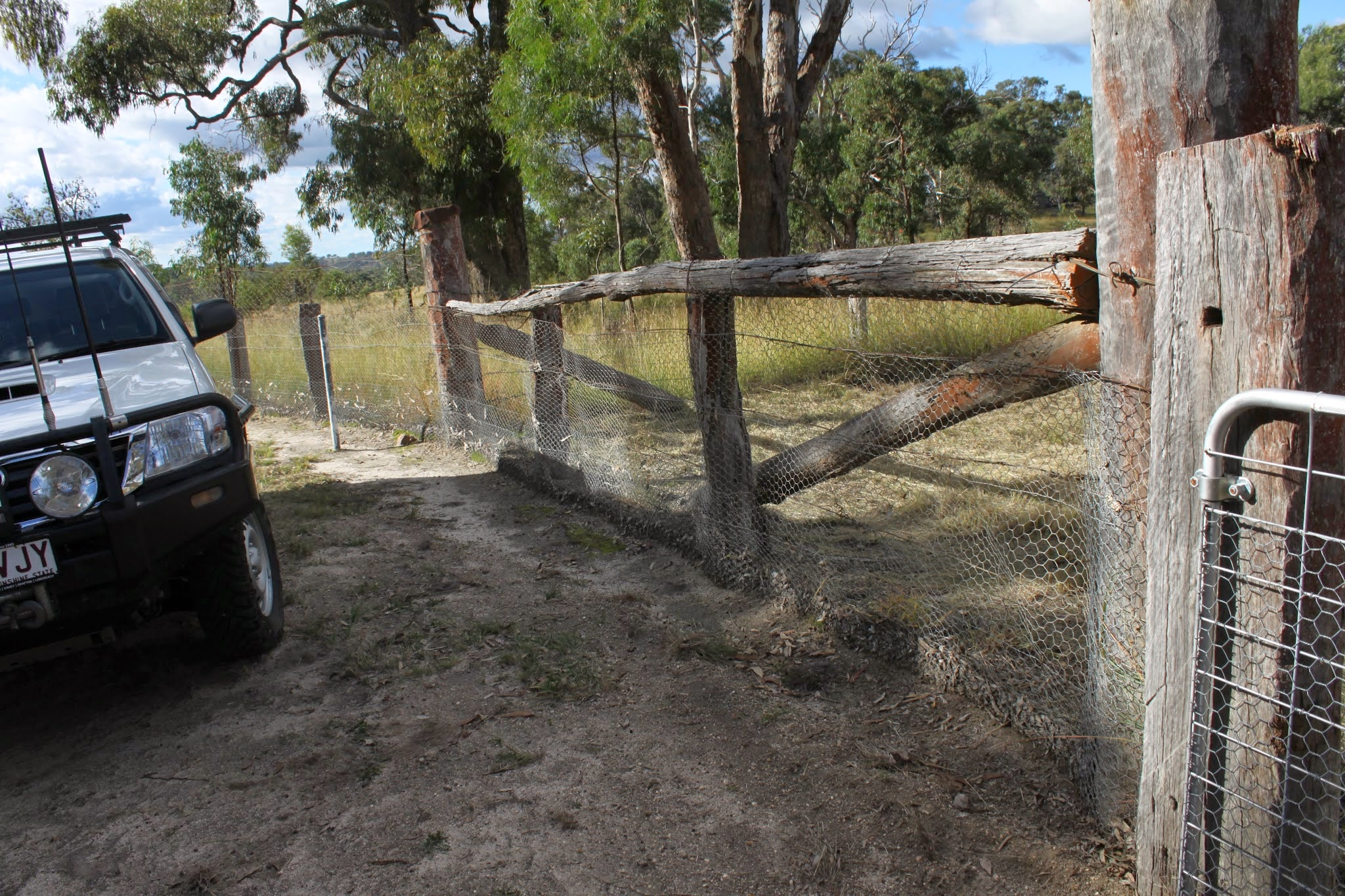
Inspectors regularly patrol and maintain the Rabbit Fence in the Darling Downs.

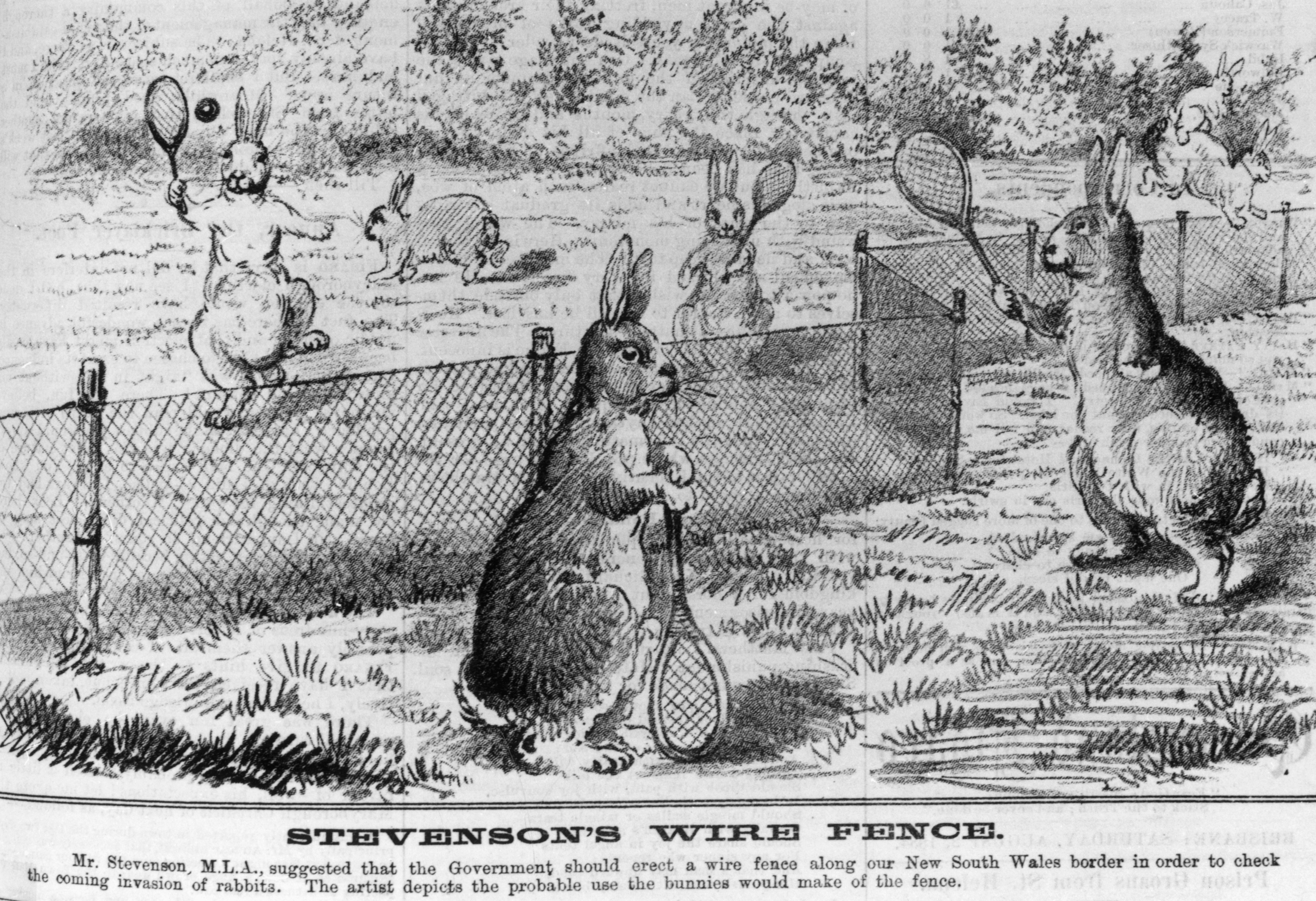
Cartoon about the rabbit fence, 1884

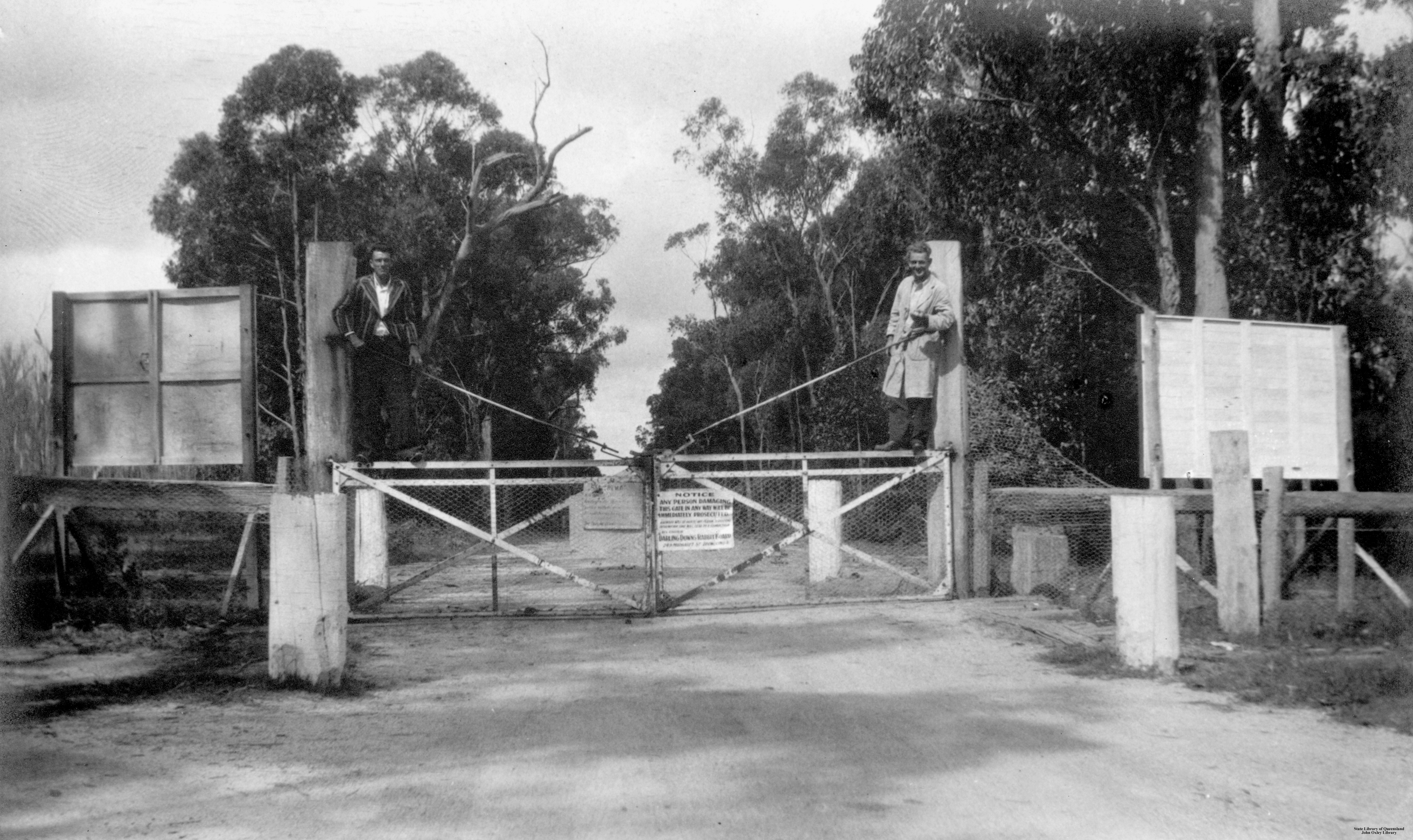
Gate in the Rabbit Fence at Stanthorpe, Queensland, 1934

The Darling Downs–Moreton Rabbit Board fence is a pest-exclusion fence constructed between 1893 and 1997 to keep rabbits out of farming areas in Queensland, Australia. It is managed by the Darling Downs–Moreton Rabbit Board.

== History ==
In 1893, a rabbit-proof fence was commenced in Queensland. It was progressively extended through the years.

In 1997, a final segment was built connecting it to the Dingo Fence. It extends from Mount Gipps (near Rathdowney) to Goombi between Chinchilla and Miles.

As of 2010, the fence was being actively patrolled and upgraded along approximately 530 kilometres (330 mi) of the border with New South Wales, extending from the Lamington Plateau near the eastern coast inland to Cottonvale.

As of 2021, the fence has been expanded to 555km of rabbit-proof fence running from Mt Gipps to Goombi.

The board has eight local councils Western Downs Region, Toowoomba Region, Southern Downs Region, Lockyer Valley Region, Ipswich, Logan, Scenic Rim Region and Gold Coast as members financing its operations.

== See also ==
- Rabbit-proof fence, the much longer rabbit fence in Western Australia
- Rabbits in Australia
- Dingo fence
