= Rabbit-proof fence =

Pest-exclusion fence in Western Australia

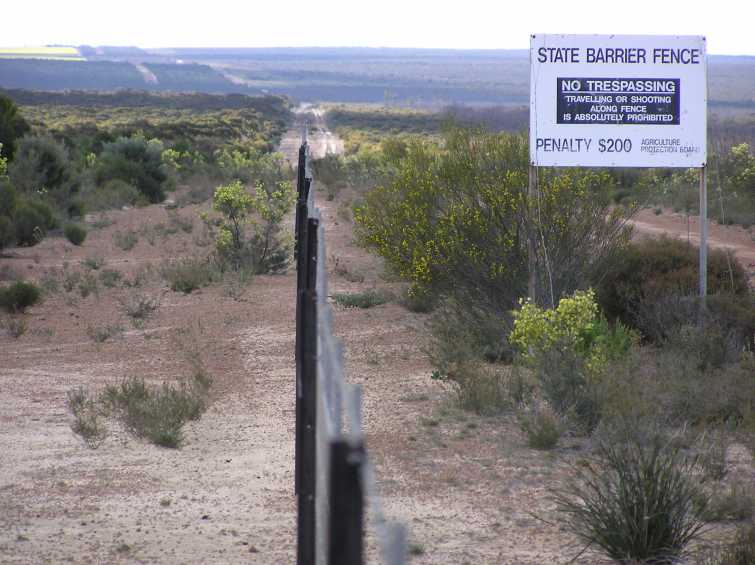
The rabbit-proof fence in 2005

The State Barrier Fence, formerly known as the Rabbit-Proof Fence, the State Vermin Barrier Fence, and the Emu Fence, is a series of pest-exclusion fences originally constructed between 1902 and 1907 to keep rabbits and other agricultural pests from entering Western Australia from the east.

There are three fences in Western Australia: the original No. 1 Fence crosses the state from north to south, No. 2 Fence is smaller and further west, and No. 3 Fence is smaller still and runs east–west. The fences took six years to build. When completed, the rabbit-proof fence (including all three fences) stretched 3,256 kilometres (2,023 mi). The cost to build each kilometre of fence at the time was about $250 (equivalent to $42,000 in 2022).

When it was completed in 1907, the 1,833-kilometre (1,139 mi) No. 1 Fence was the longest unbroken fence in the world. It was later surpassed by the Dingo Fence.

== History ==
Rabbits were introduced to Australia by the First Fleet in 1788. They became a problem after October 1859, when Thomas Austin released 24 wild rabbits from England for hunting purposes, believing "The introduction of a few rabbits could do little harm and might provide a touch of home, in addition to a spot of hunting."

With virtually no local predators, the rabbits became extremely prolific and spread rapidly across the southern parts of the country. Australia had ideal conditions for an explosion in the rabbit population, which constituted an invasive species.

By 1887, agricultural losses from rabbit damage compelled the New South Wales Government to offer a £25,000 reward (equivalent to $3,900,000 in 2022) for "any method of success not previously known in the Colony for the effectual extermination of rabbits". A Royal Commission was held in 1901 to investigate the situation. It determined to build a pest-exclusion fence.

== Construction ==
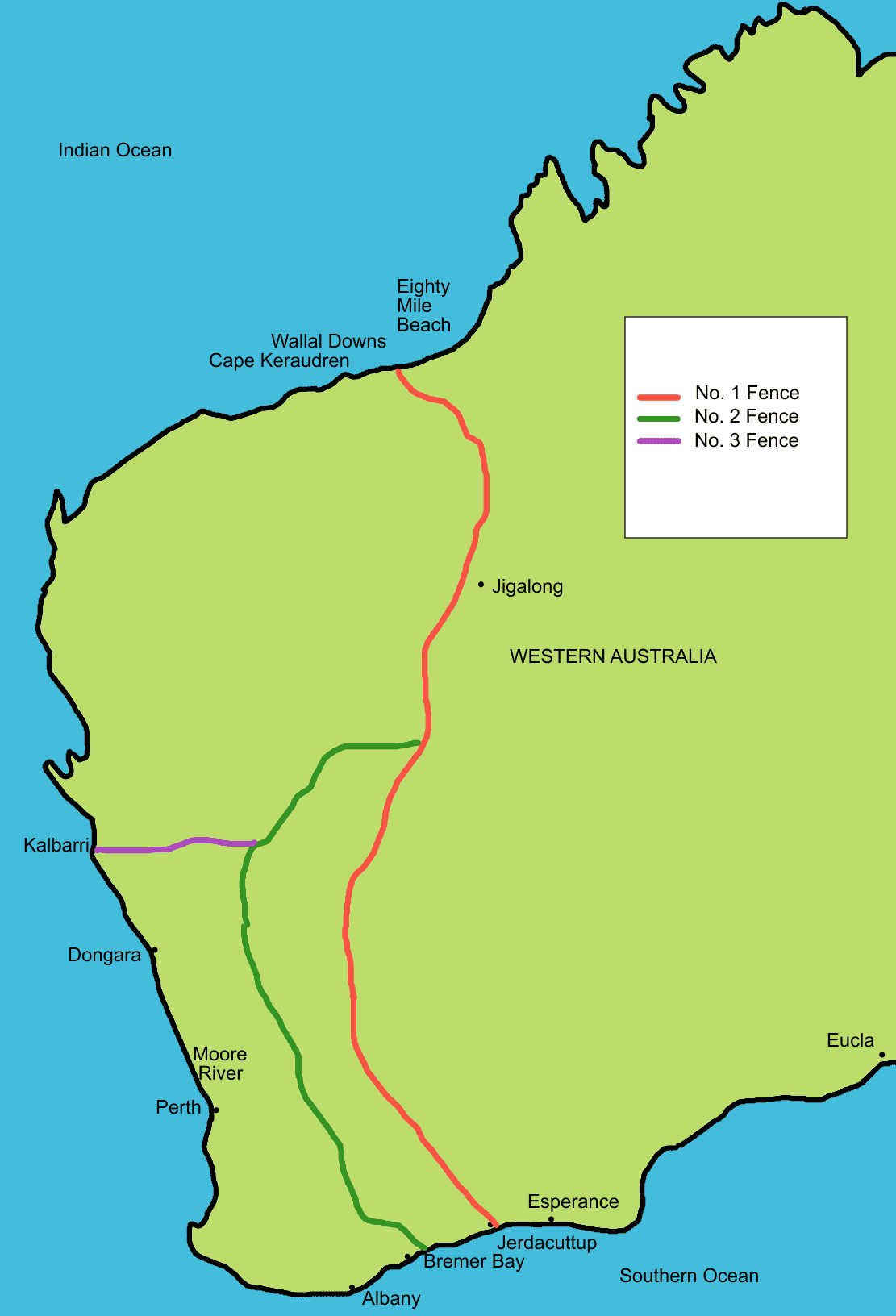
Map of the original rabbit-proof fences in Western Australia.

The fence posts are placed 12 ft (3.7 m) apart and have a minimum diameter of 4 in (100 mm). There were initially three wires of 12 1/2 gauge, strung 4 in (102 mm), 1 ft 8 in (0.5 m), and 3 ft (0.9 m) above ground, with a barbed wire added later at 3 ft 4 in (1.02 m) and a plain wire at 3 ft 7 in (1.1 m). To make the fence a barrier against dingoes and foxes as well, wire netting extending 6 in (150 mm) below ground, was attached to the wire.

The fence was constructed with a variety of materials, according to the local climate and availability of wood. At first, fence posts were made from salmon gum and gimlet, but they attracted termites (locally known as white ants) and had to be replaced. Split white gum was one of the best types of wood used in the fence. Other timbers used were mulga, wodjil, native pine, and tea-tree, depending on local availability. Iron posts were used where there was no wood. Most materials had to be hauled hundreds of kilometres from rail heads and ports by bullock, mule and camel teams.

From 1901, the fence was constructed by private contractors. In 1904, the project became the responsibility of the Public Works Department of Western Australia, under the supervision of Richard John Anketell. With a workforce of 120 men, 350 camels, 210 horses and 41 donkeys, Anketell was responsible for the construction of the greater part of No. 1 Fence and the survey of its last 70 miles (110 km).

== Maintenance ==
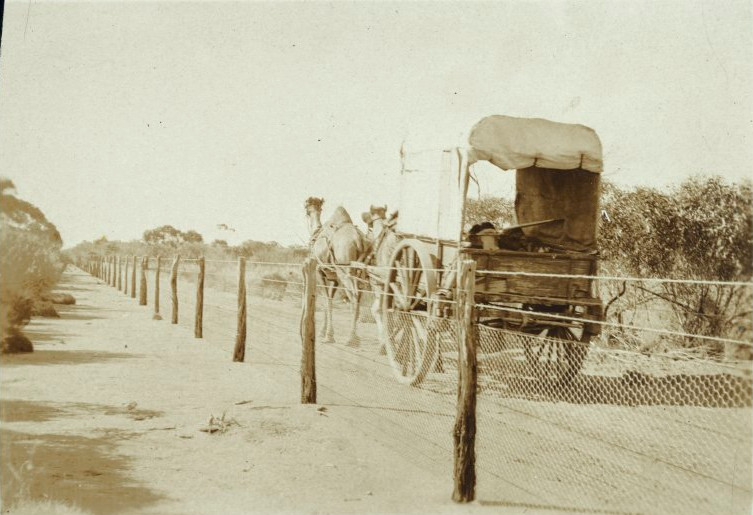
Boundary rider's team at the 100-mile (160 km) No. 1 Fence in Western Australia in 1926

Alexander Crawford took over the maintenance of the fence from Anketell as each section was finished; he was in charge until he retired in 1922. The area inside the fence to the west became known as "Crawford's Paddock". The fence was maintained at first by boundary riders riding bicycles and later by riders astride camels. However, fence inspection was difficult from atop the tall animal. In 1910, a car was bought for fence inspection, but it was subject to punctured tyres. It was found the best way to inspect the fence was using buckboard buggies, pulled by two camels.

The camels were also used as pack animals, especially in the north. In the east, camels were used to pull drays with supplies for the riders. Camels were ideal for this as they could go for a long time without water. They were considered critical to the building and maintenance of the fence.

Crawford supervised four sub-inspectors, each responsible for about 500 miles (800 km) of fence, and 25 boundary riders, who regularly patrolled 100-mile (160 km) sections of fence. Due to frontier violence in the north of the state, a 300-mile (480 km) section of No. 1 Fence was patrolled by riders who traveled in pairs.

Crawford also was responsible for eliminating rabbits that had breached the fence. In the first year following the fence's completion, rabbit colonies were found and all members killed at several locations inside the fence. These included sites near Coorow, Mullewa, and Northampton.

Following the introduction of myxomatosis to control rabbits in the 1950s, the importance of the rabbit-proof fence diminished.

== Effectiveness ==
By 1902, rabbits had already been found west of the fence line that had been initially constructed. The Number 2 Rabbit Proof Fence was built in 1905 in order to stem their advance. It held back the rabbits for many years, to such an extent that the Government Scheme for supplying rabbit netting, by extending long-term loans to farmers, was never applied to farmers west of that fence. The farmers between the two fences suffered from the ravages of the rabbits for many years, before they bred into plague form to spread out over the agricultural districts to the west of the No. 2 fence.

Overall, as a long-term barrier to rabbits, the fences were a failure; even while construction was underway, rabbits were hopping into regions that the fences were intended to protect. According to a web page published by the State Library of Western Australia, the fences represent "a unique, if inadequate, response to an overwhelming environmental problem".

== Intersection with railway system ==
No. 1 Fence intersected railway lines at:

- Eastern Railway near Burracoppin
- Wyalkatchem: Southern Cross railway at Campion
- Sandstone branch railway: just west of Anketell
- Meekatharra–Wiluna railway: at Paroo

No. 2 Fence intersected with most of the Wheatbelt railway lines of Western Australia.

== Elsewhere in Australia ==
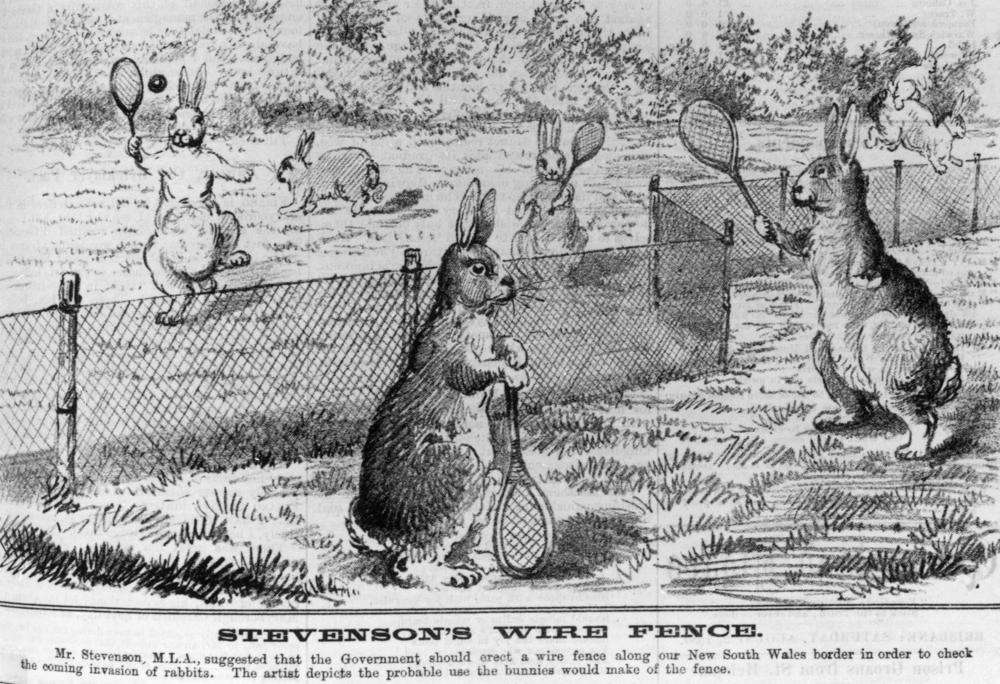
1884 cartoon in response to a proposal to erect a rabbit-proof fence between New South Wales and Queensland. The caption reads: "Mr Stevenson, M.L.A., suggested that the Government should erect a wire fence along our New South Wales border in order to check the coming invasion of rabbits. The artist depicts the probable use the bunnies would make of the fence."

The Darling Downs–Moreton Rabbit Board fence is a rabbit fence that extends along part of the Queensland–New South Wales border.

== Cultural references ==
In 1927, Arthur Upfield, an Australian writer who had previously worked on the construction of No. 1 Fence, began writing a fictional story that explored a way of disposing of a body in the desert. Before the book was published, stockman Snowy Rowles, an acquaintance of the writer, carried out at least two murders and disposed of the bodies using the method described in the book.

The 1932 trial that followed the arrest of Rowles for murder was one of the most sensational in the history of Western Australia. Decades later, Terry Walker wrote a book about this called Murder on the Rabbit Proof Fence: The Strange Case of Arthur Upfield and Snowy Rowles (1993). The events are now referred to as the Murchison Murders.

Doris Pilkington Garimara's book, Follow the Rabbit-Proof Fence (1996), describes how three Indigenous Australian girls used the fence to guide their route back home from Moore River Native Settlement to Jigalong. The girls, taken from their families in Western Australia as part of the Stolen Generations, escaped from the mission settlement. Two sisters were successful in walking hundreds of kilometers back to their family at Jigalong by following the rabbit-proof fence. Garimara is the daughter of Molly, one of the girls.

The dramatic film Rabbit-Proof Fence (2002) is based on the book. In 2016, Englishwoman Lindsey Cole walked the fence from Moore River Settlement, 1,600 kilometres (990 mi) through to Jigalong. She was met by Doris Garimara's daughter at the end of the walk in September 2016.

== See also ==
- Agricultural fencing
- Dingo Fence, through South Australia, Queensland and NSW, to protect sheep
- Rabbits in Australia

== General references ==
- Broomhall, F.H. (1991). The Longest Fence in the World: A history of the no. 1 rabbit proof fence from its beginning until recent times. Carlisle, WA: Hesperian Press. ISBN 0-85905-147-1.
