= Follow the Rabbit-Proof Fence =

1996 book by Doris Pilkington

- Author: Doris Pilkington
- Language: English
- Genre: Biography
- Publisher: University of Queensland Press
- Publication date: 1996
- Publication place: Australia
- Pages: 136 pp
- ISBN: 0-7022-2709-9
- Followed by: Under the Wintamarra Tree

Follow the Rabbit-Proof Fence is an Australian book by Doris Pilkington, published in 1996. Based on a true story, the book is a personal account of an Indigenous Australian family of three young girls: Molly (the author's mother), Daisy (Molly's half-sister), and Gracie (their cousin), who experience discrimination due to having a white father. Caught in the company of white stockmen, they are taken to the Moore River internment camp. They leave the settlement in 1931 and trek over 1,600 kilometres (990 mi) home by following the rabbit-proof fence, a massive pest-exclusion fence that crossed Western Australia from north to south.

In 2002, the book was adapted into a film, Rabbit-Proof Fence, which became a centrepiece of the Stolen Generation.

== Doris Pilkington ==
Doris Pilkington had spent much of her early life, from the age of four, at the Moore River Native Settlement in Western Australia, the same facility the book chronicles her mother's, aunt's, and cousin's escape from as children. After reuniting with her family 21 years later, Pilkington says she did not talk to her mother much, and she was not aware of her mother's captivity at Moore River nor of her escape, until her Aunt Daisy told her the story. While repeating the tale at an Aboriginal family history event in Perth, one of the attendees told Pilkington he was aware of the story and that the case was fairly well documented. He gave her some documents and clippings that formed the factual backbone of the story on which Pilkington based a first draft.

Pilkington submitted the draft to a publisher in 1985 but was told it was too much like an academic paper and that she should try her hand at writing fiction. Her first novel, Caprice, A Stockman's Daughter, won the David Unaipon Literary Award and was published in 1990 by the University of Queensland Press. Pilkington then rewrote and filled out Follow the Rabbit-Proof Fence following several years of interviewing her mother and aunt, and it was published in 1996. A third book in the trilogy was Under the Wintamarra Tree (2002). Pilkington also wrote an adaptation of Rabbit-Proof Fence for children called Home to Mother (2006).

== Summary ==
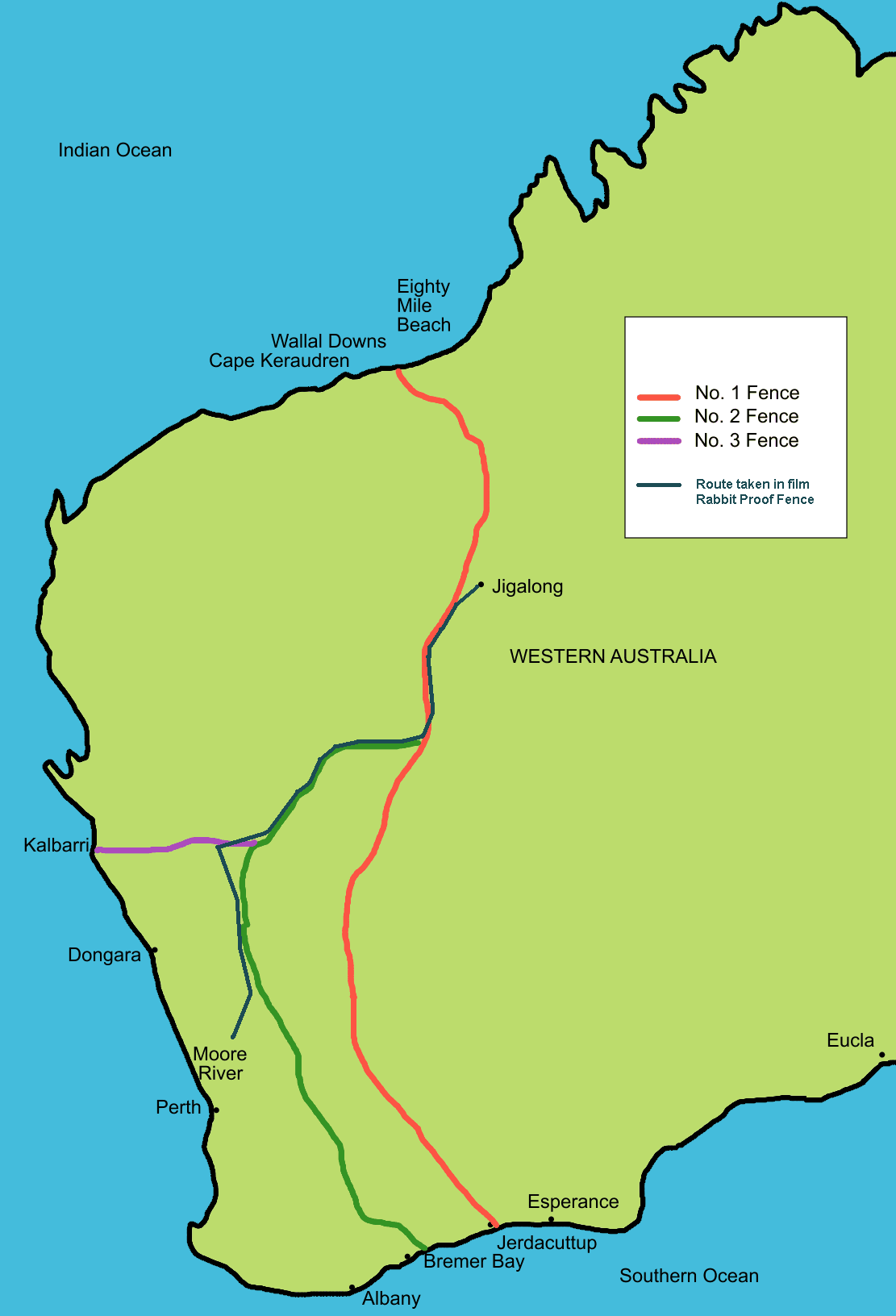
Map of the actual rabbit-proof fence showing the trip from Moore River to Jigalong.

Molly, her half-sister Daisy, and their cousin Gracie are taken to Moore River for schooling to become more like white people and to eventually be taken to a (more) rural part of Western Australia. The girls escape from the settlement and take the 1,600 km (990 mi) walk home along the rabbit-proof fence.

== Film adaptation ==
Shortly after the book's publication, the film rights were obtained by scriptwriter Christine Olsen, who wrote the script and was persistent in her pitching of the film to Hollywood-based Australian director Phillip Noyce. Noyce agreed to direct the film, which was released in 2002 and starred Everlyn Sampi as Molly and British actor Kenneth Branagh as A. O. Neville, the Chief Protector of Aborigines.
