= Susan Maushart =

American author, journalist and feminist (born 1958)

Susan Maushart (born 1958) is an American author, journalist and feminist. She lived in Perth, Western Australia, for over 20 years and now lives in New York City.

Maushart's journalistic career in Australia varied between working for the Australian Broadcasting Corporation and regular columns in the Weekend Australian. Maushart is also known for her ABC Radio series, StoryCatcher.

Her books have covered wide-ranging topics from historical, to issues related to motherhood and marriage to that of teenagers interacting with modern media.

Her book Moore River Native Settlement won the Adelaide Festival Non-fiction Award in 1994. and was short listed, in the Western Australian Premier's Book Award, 1994.

Her book The Winter of Our Disconnect, published in 2010, chronicles her family's experiment in disconnecting from technology. The book details her realization of technology's presence in her household and her execution of dealing with it, while documenting her challenges and frustrations along the way. She banned screens from her house for six months and in the end had the results she wanted. The Daily Telegraph said this story "is a channel to a wider view into the impact of new media on the lives of families, into the very heart of the meaning of home."

== Works ==
- Maushart, Susan (1993), Sort of a place like home : remembering the Moore River Native Settlement, Fremantle Arts Centre Press, ISBN 978-1-86368-060-8
- —— (2000), The mask of motherhood how becoming a mother changes everything and why we pretend it doesn't, New York Penguin Books, ISBN 978-0-14-029178-0
- —— (2010), What Women Want Next (New ed.), The Text Publishing Company, ISBN 978-1-921799-05-1
- —— (2011), Wifework: What Marriage Really Means for Women (New ed.), The Text Publishing Company, ISBN 978-1-921799-04-4
- —— (2012), The winter of our disconnect: how one family pulled the plug on their technology and lived to tell/text/tweet the tale, Profile, ISBN 978-1-84765-740-4
- Andrijich, Frances; —— (2016), Consider the clothesline: vibrant images of laundry and life, Echo Publishing, ISBN 978-1-76006-925-4
