= Rabbit-Proof Fence =

2002 Australian film by Phillip Noyce

- Theatrical release poster
- Directed by: Phillip Noyce
- Screenplay by: Christine Olsen
- Based on: Follow the Rabbit-Proof Fence by Doris Pilkington Garimara
- Produced by: Phillip Noyce; Christine Olsen; John Winter
- Starring: Everlyn Sampi; Tianna Sansbury; Laura Monaghan; David Gulpilil; Kenneth Branagh
- Cinematography: Christopher Doyle
- Edited by: Veronika Jenet; John Scott
- Music by: Peter Gabriel
- Production companies: Australian Film Finance Corporation; Rumbalara Films; Olsen Levy; Showtime Australia
- Distributed by: Becker Group (Australia); HanWay Films (Overseas)
- Release date: 4 February 2002
- Running time: 93 minutes
- Country: Australia
- Languages: Walmajarri; English
- Budget: US$6 million
- Box office: US$16.2 million

Rabbit-Proof Fence is a 2002 Australian epic drama film directed and produced by Phillip Noyce. It was based on the 1996 book Follow the Rabbit-Proof Fence by Doris Pilkington Garimara, an Aboriginal Australian author. It is loosely based on the author's mother Molly Craig, aunt Daisy Kadibil, and cousin Gracie, who escaped from the Moore River Native Settlement, north of Perth, Western Australia, to return to their Aboriginal families. They had been removed from their families and placed there in 1931.

The film follows the Aboriginal girls as they walk for nine weeks along 1,600 km (990 mi) of the Australian rabbit-proof fence to return to their community at Jigalong. They were pursued by white law enforcement officials and an Aboriginal tracker. The film explores the official child removal policy that existed in Australia between approximately 1905 and 1967. Its victims, who were taken from their families, now are called the "Stolen Generations".

The soundtrack to the film, called Long Walk Home: Music from the Rabbit-Proof Fence, is by English singer and songwriter Peter Gabriel. British producer Jeremy Thomas, who has a long connection with Australia, was executive producer of the film. He sold it internationally through his company HanWay Films. In 2005, the British Film Institute included this film in the BFI list of the "50 films one should see by the age of 14."

== Plot ==
In 1931, two sisters – 14-year-old Molly and 8-year-old Daisy – and their 10-year-old cousin Gracie are living in the Western Australian town of Jigalong. The town lies along the northern part of one of the original No. 1 Fence – part of Australia's rabbit-proof fence – which runs for over one thousand miles.

More than a thousand miles away in Perth, the official Protector of Western Australian Aborigines, A. O. Neville (called Mr. Devil by them), signs an order to relocate the three girls to the Moore River Native Settlement. The children are referred to by Neville as "half-castes", because they each have Aboriginal mothers and white fathers. Neville had concluded that the Aboriginal people of Australia were a danger to themselves, and the "half-castes" must be bred out of existence. He plans to place the girls in a camp where they, along with all half-castes of that age range, both boys and girls, will grow up.

They would be trained to work as labourers and servants to white families, which were regarded as advantageous situations for them in life. It was assumed that they would marry whites, and so on through the generations, so that eventually the Aboriginal "blood" would diminish in society.

The three girls are forcibly taken from their families at Jigalong by a local constable, Riggs. They were sent to the camp at the Moore River Native Settlement, in the south west, about 90 kilometres (56 mi) north of Perth.

While at the camp, the girls are housed in a large dormitory with dozens of other children, where they are strictly regimented by nuns. They are prohibited from speaking their native language, forced to pray as Christians, and subject to corporal punishment for any infractions of the camp's rules. Attempts at escape are also harshly punished, as seen in the film, where an escapee is beaten and has her hair cut off. During an impending thunderstorm that will help cover their tracks, Molly convinces the girls to escape and return to their home.

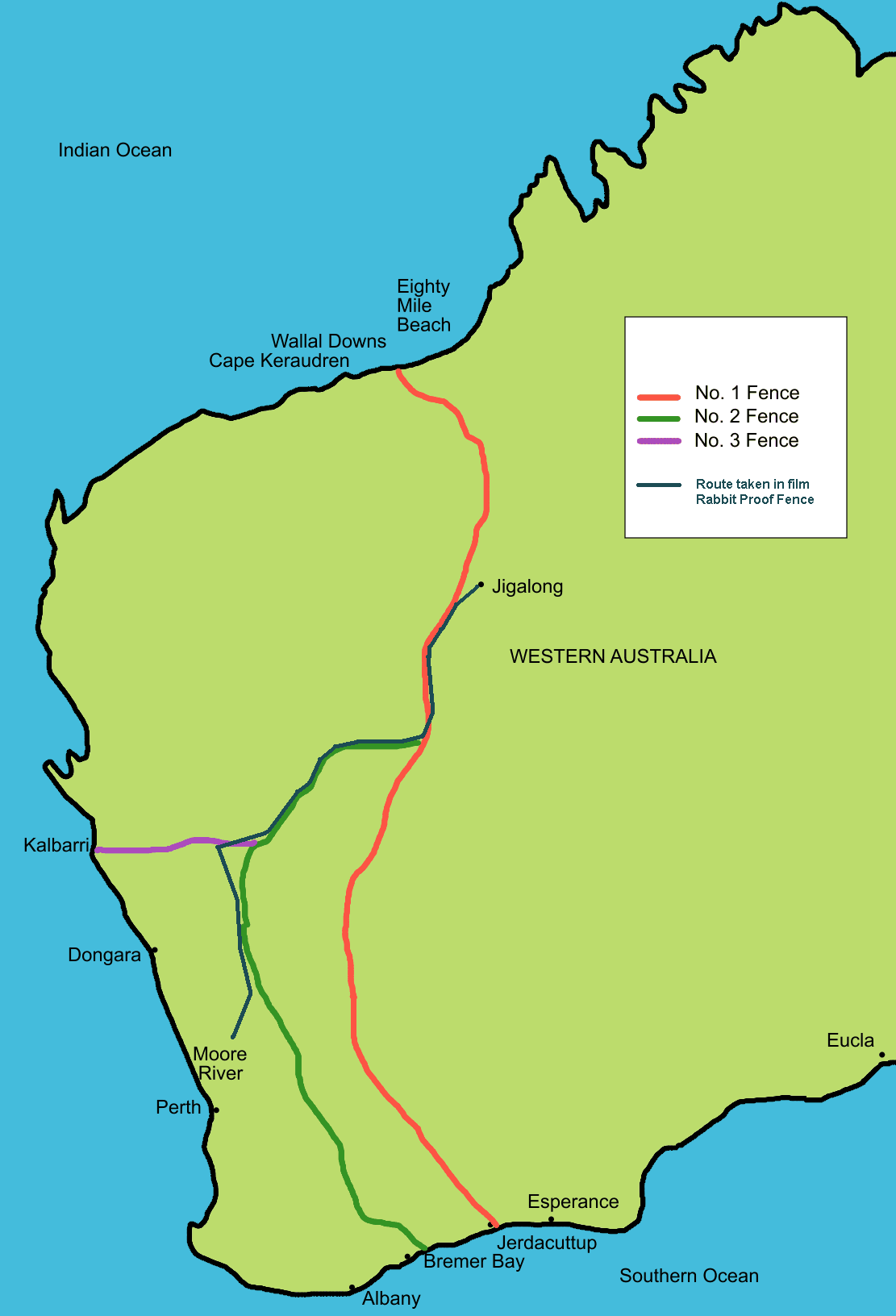
Map of the rabbit-proof fence showing the trip from Moore River to Jigalong

During their flight, the girls are relentlessly pursued by Moodoo, an Aboriginal tracker from the camp. They eventually find their way back to the rabbit-proof fence, which they believe will lead them back to their home. They follow the fence for months, encountering a family who gives them clothes and food, as well as a camper who shows them a shortcut, which allows them to narrowly avoid Moodoo and Neville's agents. They also encounter a maid, who lets them stay at her room for a night, but they are discovered by her master, who is implied to be abusing her. After another narrow escape, Neville spreads word that Gracie's mother is waiting for her in the town of Wiluna. The information finds its way to an Aboriginal traveller who "helps" the girls.

He tells Gracie about her mother and says they can get to Wiluna by train, causing her to leave the other two girls in an attempt to catch a train to Wiluna. Molly and Daisy soon walk after her and find her at a train station. They are not reunited, however, as Riggs appears and Gracie is recaptured. The betrayal is revealed by Riggs, who tells the man he will receive a shilling for his help.

Knowing they are powerless to aid her, Molly and Daisy continue their journey. They lose the fence for a while travelling through a harsh desert, but Molly is eventually guided back by an eagle. In the end, after a nine-week journey through the harsh Australian outback, having walked the 1,670 km (1,040 mi) route along the fence, the two sisters return home and go into hiding in the desert with their mother and grandmother. Meanwhile, Neville realizes he can no longer afford the search for Molly and Daisy, and decides to end it.

=== Epilogue ===
The film's epilogue shows recent footage of Molly and Daisy. Molly explains that Gracie died before she could ever return to Jigalong. Molly says that she had two daughters. She and they were taken from Jigalong back to Moore River. She managed to escape with one daughter, her young Annabelle. She carried the girl much of the way along the length of the fence back home. However, Annabelle was taken away once more when she was three years old. Molly never saw her again. In closing, Molly says that she and Daisy "... are never going back to that place".

== Cast ==
- Everlyn Sampi as Molly Craig
- Tianna Sansbury as Daisy Craig Kadibil
- Laura Monaghan as Gracie Fields
- David Gulpilil as Moodoo the Tracker
- Jason Clarke as Constable Riggs
- Kenneth Branagh as A. O. Neville
- Ningali Lawford as Maude, Molly's mother
- Myarn Lawford as Molly's grandmother
- Deborah Mailman as Mavis
- Garry McDonald as Mr. Neal
- Roberta Lynch as The Teacher
- Roy Billing as Police Inspector
- Natasha Wanganeen as Nina, Dormitory Boss
- Lorna Lesley as Miss Thomas

== Production ==
The film is adapted from the book Follow the Rabbit-Proof Fence, by Doris Pilkington Garimara, an Aboriginal Australian. It is the second book of her trilogy documenting her family's stories. The other two books are Caprice: A Stockman's Daughter (1991) and Under the Wintamarra Tree (2002).

Stills photographs in the film were made by well-known Aboriginal Australian photographer Mervyn Bishop. His work is held at the National Portrait Gallery of Australia.

== Reception ==
=== Public reception ===
The film stirred controversy in Australia relating to the government's historical policy of removing mixed-race Aboriginal children from their families in Aboriginal communities and placing them in state institutions. They became known as the Stolen Generations.

Eric Abetz, a government minister, announced the publication of a leaflet criticising the film's portrayal of the treatment of Indigenous Australians, and demanded an apology from the filmmakers. Director Phillip Noyce suggested that instead the government should apologise to the numerous Indigenous people affected by the removal policy.

Conservative commentators, such as Piers Akerman of Sydney's Daily Telegraph and Andrew Bolt of the Herald Sun, criticized the film's historical accuracy. Bolt attacked what he described as numerous disparities between the film and Pilkington Garimara's novel. Pilkington Garimara replied that Bolt had misquoted her. Screenwriter Christine Olsen wrote a detailed response to Bolt's claims, and academic Robert Manne accused Bolt of historical denialism.

Olsen attributed the angry response among some of the public to the fact that it was based in events that were "demonstrably true" and well-documented. However, the filmmaker said that the film was meant primarily as a drama rather than a political or historical statement. Noyce said, "If drama comes from conflict, there's no greater conflict in Australian history than the conflict between Indigenous Australians and white settlers."

The historian Keith Windschuttle also disputed the film's depiction of events. In his work The Fabrication of Aboriginal History, he wrote that Molly and the two other girls had been removed for their own welfare, and that the two older girls had been sexually involved with white men. Noyce and Olsen rejected these criticisms, stating that Windschuttle's research was incomplete. Pilkington Garimara denied Windschuttle's claims of sexual activity between her mother and local whites, stating that the claims were a distortion of history.

=== Critical response ===
The film received positive reviews from critics. Review aggregator Rotten Tomatoes's score is 88% based on 145 reviews. The site's Critics' Consensus states, "Visually beautiful and well-acted, Rabbit-Proof Fence tells a compelling true-life story". On Metacritic, the film has an aggregated score of 80 out of 100, indicating "generally favorable reviews".

David Stratton of SBS awarded the film four stars out of five, commenting that Rabbit-Proof Fence is a "bold and timely film about the stolen generations."

=== Box office ===
Rabbit-Proof Fence grossed $16.2 million worldwide, including $3.8 million in Australia.

== Accolades ==
=== Wins ===
2001 – Queensland Premier's Literary Awards
- Film Script—the Pacific Film and Television Commission Award: Christine Olsen
2002 – Australian Film Institute Awards
- Best Film: Phillip Noyce, Christine Olsen, John Winter
- Best Original Music Score: Peter Gabriel
- Best Sound: Bronwyn Murphy, Craig Carter, Ricky Edwards, John Penders
2002 – Film Critics Circle of Australia Awards
- Best Director: Phillip Noyce
- Best Screenplay—Adapted: Christine Olsen
2002 – Inside Film Awards
- Best Actress: Everlyn Sampi
- Best Production Design: Roger Ford
2002 – New South Wales Premier's History Awards
- shortlisted for the Young People's History Prize: Christine Olsen and Phillip Noyce
2002 – Aspen Filmfest
- Audience Award, Audience Favourite Feature: Phillip Noyce
2002 – Political Film Society Awards
- Exposé
- Human Rights
2002 – Castellinaria International Festival of Young Cinema
- ASPI Award: Phillip Noyce
- Golden Castle (Phillip Noyce)
2002 – Starz Encore Denver International Film Festival
- People's Choice Award: Best Feature-Length Fiction Film: Phillip Noyce
2002 – Durban International Film Festival
- Audience Award: Phillip Noyce
2002 – Edinburgh International Film Festival
- Audience Award: Phillip Noyce
2002 – Leeds International Film Festival
- Audience Award: Phillip Noyce
2002 – National Board of Review Awards 2002
- Freedom of Expression Award
- Best Director: Phillip Noyce
2002 – San Francisco Film Critics Circle
- Special Citation: Phillip Noyce, also for The Quiet American (2002)
- Audience Award: Best Foreign Film: Phillip Noyce
2002 – Valladolid International Film Festival
- Audience Award: Feature Film: Phillip Noyce
2003 – London Critics Circle Film Awards (ALFS)
- Director of the Year: Phillip Noyce, also for The Quiet American (2002)
2003 – São Paulo International Film Festival
- Audience Award: Best Foreign Film: Phillip Noyce

=== Nominations ===
2002 – Australian Film Institute Awards
- Best Actor in a Supporting Role: David Gulpilil
- Best Cinematography: Christopher Doyle
- Best Costume Design: Roger Ford
- Best Direction: Phillip Noyce
- Best Editing: Veronika Jenet, John Scott
- Best Production Design: Roger Ford
- Best Screenplay Adapted from Another Source: Christine Olsen
2002 – Film Critics Circle of Australia Awards
- Best Actor—Female: Everlyn Sampi
- Best Cinematography: Christopher Doyle
- Best Film
- Best Music Score: Peter Gabriel
2002 – International Film Festival of the Art of Cinematography Camerimage
- Golden Frog: Christopher Doyle
2002 – Golden Trailer Awards
- Golden Trailer: Best Independent
2003 – Golden Globe Awards
- Golden Globe: Best Original Score—Motion Picture: Peter Gabriel
2003 – Motion Picture Sound Editors
- Golden Reel Award: Best Sound Editing in Foreign Features: Juhn Penders, Craig Carter, Steve Burgess, Ricky Edwards, Andrew Plain
2003 – Young Artist Awards
- Best Performance in a Feature Film—Supporting Young Actress: Everlyn Sampi
- Best Performance in a Feature Film—Young Actress Age Ten or Under: Tianna Sansbury

== See also ==
- Cinema of Australia
- Survival film, about the film genre, with a list of related films
