= Moore River Native Settlement =

Disbanded Aboriginal settlement and internment camp in Western Australia

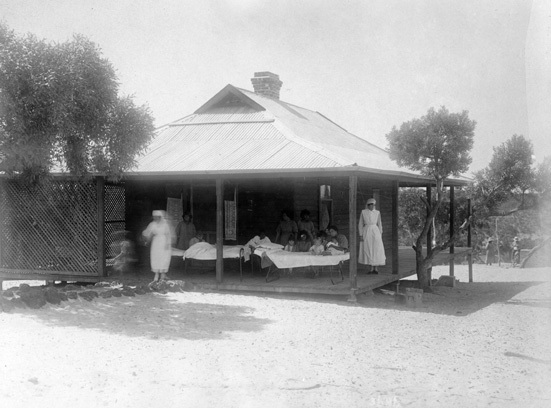
Moore River Settlement Hospital, c. 1920

The Moore River Native Settlement (Note: Also referred to as the Mogumber Prison.) was the name of the now defunct Aboriginal settlement and internment camp located 135 kilometres (84 mi) north of Perth and 11 kilometres (6.8 mi) west of Mogumber in Western Australia, near the headwaters of the Moore River.

== History ==
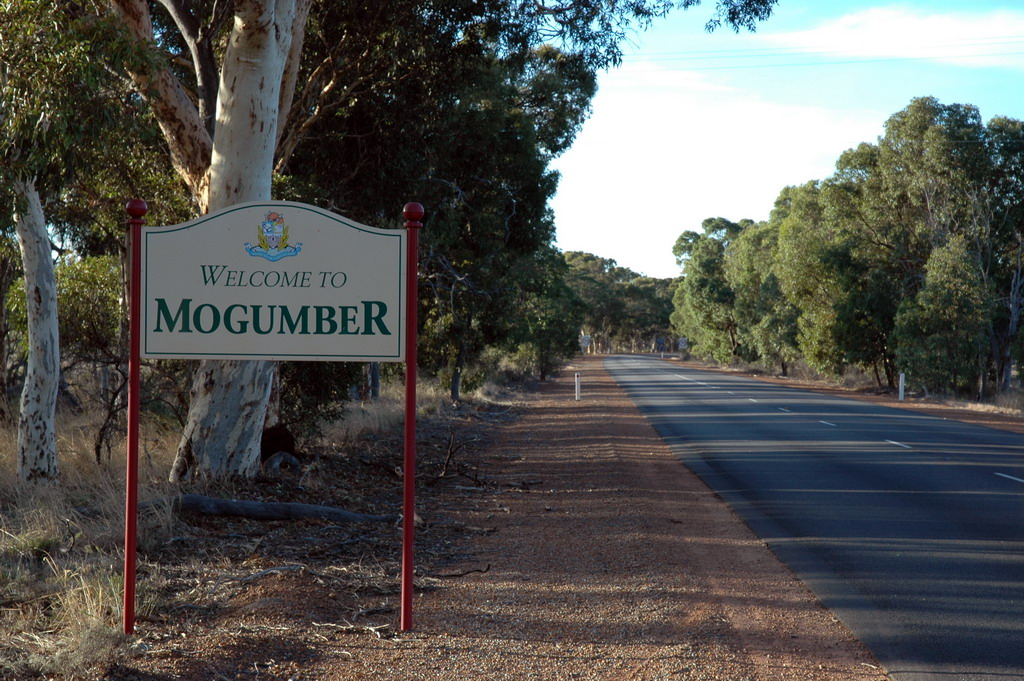
Mogumber Western Australia

The settlement was opened by the Government of Western Australia in 1918. It was originally intended to be a small, self-supporting farming settlement for 200 Aboriginal people, with schooling and health facilities available for the children and employment opportunities for the adults. The settlement was supposed to accommodate Aboriginal people drawn mainly from the Murchison, Midlands and south-west regions of Western Australia.

The ambition to turn the settlement into a farming community failed because the land was unsuitable for cultivation. During the 1920s its purpose shifted; residents were usually brought there against their will as the camp attempted to fulfill the broader functions of orphanage, creche, relief depot and home for old persons, unmarried mothers, and the unwell. It also housed many "half-caste" (mixed-race) children. Many of the Aboriginal and mixed-race children were taken from their homes and sent to Moore River, usually against their will, as part of the Stolen Generations.

The Moore River Native Settlement was opened under the auspices of the Chief Protector of Aborigines, A. O. Neville. Neville came to this position completely inexperienced in Aboriginal affairs or any dealings with Aboriginal people. He was strongly guided by Rufus Henry Underwood. Neville adopted Underwood's anti-mission stance and between them developed the "native settlement scheme", devised to meet the varying demands of non-Aboriginal people, for their segregation from the wider community and the continuing need for Aboriginal labour. It was also meant to fulfil Neville and Underwood's determination to devise a solution involving an absolute minimum of expenditure.

=== Settlement timeline ===
The below timeline is based in part on the chronology created by the Mogumber Heritage Committee and published in 1990 as part of their Pictorial Collection Exhibition

Year	Event	Notes
1905	Aborigines Act (1905) passes WA Parliament	
1915	Neville appointed Chief Protector of Aborigines	in 1936 he becomes Commissioner for Native Affairs
1917	Government establishes the Moore River Native Settlement	
1918	First people arrive	Mitchell appointed camps first Superintendent
1921	Superintendent Major Campbell takes over	
1924	Campbell killed in car crash	
1924	Superintendent John Brodie takes over	
1927	Brodie sacked, A. J. Neal takes over	
1928	deputation speaks to Premier Philip Collier	
1929	Depression starts	
1933	Northam people forcibly removed to the Moore River Native Settlement	
1934	Moseley Royal Commission	"to inquire into the allegations of maltreatment of aborigines generally, the State Aborigines Act, and the administration of the Aborigines department"
1936	Aborigines Act in WA Parliament	changes arising from recommendations of the Moseley Royal Commission
1939	A. J. Neal moves to Carrolup	
1939	Paget appointed superintendent	
1940	Neville retires	replaced by Bray
1940's	frequent changes in superintendents	
1949	S G Middleton appointed Commissioner for Native Affairs	
1950	Planning for hand over to Methodist Church begins	
1951	becomes the Mogumber Native Mission	
1967	The 1967 Referendum allowed Aboriginal people to be counted in the Australian census.	
1974	CLOSES	

== Poor conditions ==
The camp population became increasingly mixed as Aboriginal people came in from various parts of the state, with some coming from as far away as the Kimberley and Pilbara. By the mid-1920s conditions in the institution had declined significantly as overcrowding and poor sanitation were the norm, with many health problems being reported amongst its population. From 1924, the settlement had an average population of 300 and its buildings were becoming dilapidated. By 1933 the Aboriginal population at the institution had risen to over 500, leading to greater deterioration in the conditions experienced. Between 1918 and 1952, 346 deaths were recorded at Moore River Native Settlement, 42% of which were children age 1–5.

Socially, Moore River Native Settlement practised strict segregation of the sexes and separated children from their parents under the dormitory system. Compound inmates were not allowed to leave without written permission. Absconding was a common problem as many tried to re-unite with family members living outside the settlement. To counter this practice, a small number of Aboriginal men were employed as trackers to apprehend absconders.

== Name change ==
In 1951 the government handed control of the settlement to the Mogumber Methodist Mission, which renamed it Mogumber Native Mission. A greater emphasis was placed by the new owners on Christian guidance and on the vocational training of youths than had existed when it was a government institution. The facility remained running until 1974, when it was taken over by the Aboriginal Land Trust. Currently the land is leased to the Wheatbelt Aboriginal Corporation, and is known as Budjarra.

== Cultural and journalistic coverage ==
Several plays, films and books have been produced which tell harrowing tales of life in the settlement:

- Aboriginal poet and playwright Jack Davis' play Kullark where an Aboriginal man named Thomas Yorlah is forcibly moved to the settlement and makes numerous attempts to escape. Along with this, in his play No Sugar, the entire Aboriginal population in Northam is sent to the settlement. Davis lived in the settlement in the 1920s.
- The book Follow the Rabbit-Proof Fence by Doris Pilkington and its film adaptation (Rabbit-Proof Fence) tell the story of three Aboriginal girls who ran away from the settlement in 1931.
- The book Broken Circles by Anna Haebich provides a detailed description of stolen generation experience.

== See also ==
- Noongar

== General references ==
- Anderson, Hazel; Little, Ernestine; Wolfe, Wondy (1993), Nyoongar Yorgas remember : early days at Moore River Settlement, Green River Books
- Wadley Dowley, Carolyn (2000). Through silent country. Fremantle Arts Centre Press. ISBN 978-1-86368-281-7.
- Manne, Robert. "The Colour of Prejudice". Sydney Morning Herald.

== Sources ==
- Haebich, Anna (1988). For Their Own Good: Aborigines and Government in the South West of Western Australia 1900-1940. Nedlands: UWA Publishing. ISBN 978-0-85564-280-8. LCCN 89139671. OCLC 19964976. OL 2259057M. Wikidata Q136540470.
- Maushart, Susan (2003), Sort of a place like home : remembering the Moore River Native Settlement (Rev. ed.), Fremantle Arts Centre Press, ISBN 978-1-920731-12-0

...
