= A. O. Neville =

Australian public servant (1875–1954)

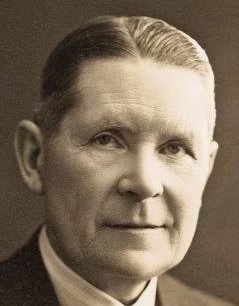
- Neville in 1940

Chief Protector of Aborigines in Western Australia
- In office 25 March 1915 – 1936
- Preceded by: Charles Gale
- Succeeded by: Office abolished

Commissioner of Native Affairs in Western Australia
- In office 1936–1940
- Preceded by: Office established
- Succeeded by: Francis Illingworth Bray

Personal details
- Born: Auber Octavius Neville; November 20, 1875 Ford, Northumberland, United Kingdom
- Died: April 18, 1954 (aged 78) Perth, Australia
- Spouse: Maryan Florence Low (m. 1910)
- Children: 5

Auber Octavius Neville (20 November 1875 – 18 April 1954) was a British-Australian public servant who served as the Chief Protector of Aborigines and Commissioner of Native Affairs in Western Australia, a total term from 1915 to 1940 and his retirement from government.

Neville was a supporter of eugenics. He believed that Aboriginal Australians needed to be assimilated and could eventually be absorbed into the larger European population through mixed marriages. As Chief Protector and Commissioner, he helped shape Western Australia's policy towards Aboriginal Australians. Since the late twentieth century, Neville has become an infamous historical figure in Australia for his role in creating the Stolen Generations. He was portrayed by Kenneth Branagh in the film Rabbit-Proof Fence (2002), which explored this period.

== Early life ==
Auber Octavius Neville was born on 20 November 1875 in Ford, Northumberland, United Kingdom. After living for ten years in Victoria, British Columbia with his parents, Neville moved as a young man in 1897 to Western Australia, where his brother was practising law.

== Career ==
After arriving in Western Australia, Neville joined the Department of Works as a records clerk; he quickly rose through the ranks due to his efficiency. In 1900, he was appointed registrar of a sub-department of Premier John Forrest's office. In 1902, he was promoted to registrar of the Colonial Secretary's Department.

In 1906, Neville became an immigration officer. In 1910 he was appointed as the secretary of a new department organising immigration and tourism. He assisted in fostering the migration of 40,000 British people to Western Australia between 1910 and 1914. Following the outbreak of World War I, he was appointed as secretary of the War Patriotic Fund.

=== Chief Protector of Aborigines ===
On 25 March 1915, Neville was the state's second appointee to the role of the Chief Protector of Aborigines, although he had no experience in that area.

Neville worked from Murray Street, Perth and had under him a secretary and either five or six clerks. He had only one travelling inspector, E.C. Mitchell, from 1925 to 1930. That year he had to sack Mitchell due to the Great Depression. His administration had a budget of one pound and nine shillings per Indigenous Australian.

During the next quarter-century, Neville presided over the controversial policy of removing Aboriginal children from their families, especially if they were of mixed race, for education and assimilation to mainstream Australian life. Such children came to be called the Stolen Generations.

Early on as Chief Protector, Neville took control of the mission at Carrolup and expanded it to be self-reliant. In 1918, a mission opened at Moore River. In northern Western Australia, Neville wanted to take control of missions and transform them into self-reliant cattle stations with Moola Bulla in the Kimberley as his model. Neville believed this was a way to save government money, but it would also give Aboriginal residents on the missions work to do. Neville is quoted as saying that "scores of the children are growing up without any prospect of a future before them, being alienated from their old bush life, and rendered more or less useless for the condition of life being forced upon them".

Neville acquired the former pastoral stations of Munja in 1926 and Violet Valley in 1935, with the purpose of establishing them as stations to "pacify the natives and accustom them to white man's ways and thus enable further settlement". Despite this, no other missions were established in the north during Neville's time in office. Some Aboriginal Australians were forcibly forced onto missions, with at least 500 Aboriginal people (around a quarter of the native population in southern Western Australia) being removed to missions from 1915 to 1920. At age 14, children of mixed descent were sent out from missions to work. A high proportion of the girls returned pregnant. Neville was annoyed at the burden this placed on the government to support their babies, but did not feel that this was an important issue.

By the 1930s, Neville refined his beliefs of integrating Indigenous Australians into white culture. The practice of removing mixed-race Aboriginal/European children from their families was advocated at the time as part of a plan to "breed out the colour" by having those children brought up as though they were white. The idea was that over successive generations, they would marry people of increasingly European descent, until there would be no Aboriginal people in Australia at all. At the time, many whites believed that "full-blooded" Aboriginal people were dying out.

Non-Indigenous people in Western Australia expressed mixed feelings towards Neville's policies of miscegenation.

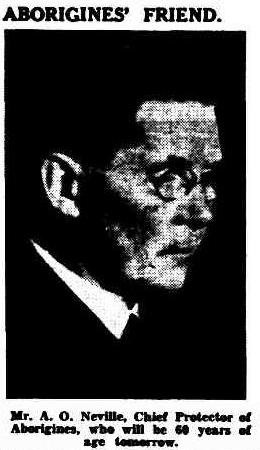
Neville in a 19 November 1935 edition of The West Australian. The caption reads at the top "Aborigines' Friend", and "Mr. A. O. Neville, Chief Protector of Aborigines, who will be 60 years of age tomorrow

=== Commissioner of Native Affairs ===
In 1934, the WA government set up the Moseley Royal Commission to examine the state of Aboriginal people with regard to the role of Chief Protector. The result was that the Chief Protector was given more authority over the lives of Western Australian Aboriginal people which, some say, only increased their suffering.

In 1936, Neville was appointed as the Commissioner for Native Affairs, a post he held until his retirement in 1940.

Neville represented WA at the Conference of Commonwealth and State Aboriginal Authorities held in Canberra from April 21 to 23, 1937. As a result, several of Neville's policies of absorption and assimilation were adopted nationwide; the first resolution passed by the conference stated that "the destiny of the natives of aboriginal origin, but not of the full blood, lies in their ultimate absorption by the people of the Commonwealth, and it therefore recommends that all efforts be directed to that end".

Neville was one of the most influential delegates at the conference, and declared:

Are we going to have one million blacks in the Commonwealth or are we going to merge them into our white community and eventually forget that there were any Aborigines in Australia?

Neville believed that biological absorption was the key to 'uplifting the Native race.' Speaking at the Moseley Royal Commission, he defended the policies of forced settlement, removing children from parents, surveillance, discipline and punishment, arguing that:

"[T]hey have to be protected against themselves whether they like it or not. They cannot remain as they are. The sore spot requires the application of the surgeon's knife for the good of the patient, and probably against the patient's will."

Neville stated that children had not been removed indiscriminately, saying that:

"[T]he children who have been removed as wards of the Chief Protector have been removed because I desired to be satisfied that the conditions surrounding their upbringing were satisfactory, which they certainly were not."

Policies adopted by the conference ended with the outbreak of the Second World War.

In 1940, Neville retired from his role as Commissioner after reaching the retirement age of 65. He was succeeded by Francis Bray.

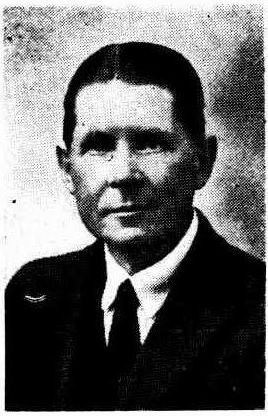
Neville in 1936

=== Retirement ===
In 1947, Neville published Australia's Coloured Minority, a text outlining his plan for the biological absorption of Aboriginal people into non-Aboriginal Australia. The book defends his policy but also acknowledges that Aboriginal people had been harmed by European intervention.

For that reason, he said, more had to be done to assist them:

"I make no apologies for writing the book, because there are things which need to be said. So few of our own people as a whole are aware of the position [of Aborigines]. Yet we have had the coloured man amongst us for a hundred years or more. He has died in his hundreds, nay thousands, in pain, misery and squalor, and through avoidable ill-health. Innumerable little children have perished through neglect and ignorance. The position, in some vital respects, is not much better today than it was fifty years ago. Man is entitled to a measure of happiness in his life. Yet most of these people have never known real happiness. Some are never likely to know it. The causes of their condition are many. Mainly it is not their fault, it is ours, just as it lies with us to put the matter right."

In 1947, following his retirement, he was invited to represent the State of Western Australia on discussions regarding Aboriginal Welfare in connection with the Woomera Test Range, prior to its establishment.

== Personal life ==
In London on 1 June 1910, Neville married Maryan Florence Low. Together, they had five children - three daughters and two sons.

Neville was an Anglican like his father, participating in the church as a lay-reader and chorister.

Neville was a notable resident of Darlington. He was a regular user of the Eastern Railway which closed a few months before his death. He died in Perth on 18 April 1954, survived by his wife and two of his children. He was buried in Karrakatta Cemetery.

== Representation in other media ==
In the late twentieth century, Australian policies came under examination, including Neville's policy of assimilation. Jack Davis wrote a play, No Sugar (1985), exploring Neville's policy.

Neville was also featured as the public face of assimilation policy in the 2002 film Rabbit-Proof Fence, in which he was played by Kenneth Branagh.
