= Doris Pilkington Garimara =

Aboriginal Australian author (1937–2014)

Doris Pilkington Garimara AM
- Born: Nugi Garimara c. 1 July 1937; Balfour Downs Station, Western Australia
- Died: 10 April 2014 (aged 76); Perth, Western Australia
- Other name: Doris Pilkington
- Occupations: Writer, nurse
- Family: Molly Craig (mother); Daisy Kadibil (aunt)
- Honours: Western Australian Writers Hall of Fame

Doris Pilkington Garimara AM (born Nugi Garimara; c. 1 July 1937 – 10 April 2014), also known as Doris Pilkington, was an Aboriginal Australian author.

Garimara wrote Follow the Rabbit-Proof Fence (1996), a story about the Stolen Generations, and based on three Aboriginal girls, among them Pilkington's mother, Molly Craig and her aunt Daisy Kadibil who escaped from the Moore River Native Settlement in Western Australia and travelled 2,414 km (1,500 miles) for nine weeks to return to their family.

== Biography ==
Pilkington was born at Balfour Downs Station, near the north Western Australian settlement of Jigalong. Her mother, Molly, named her Nugi Garimara, but she was called Doris by Molly's employer at the station, Mary Dunnet, who thought Nugi was "a stupid name". As her birth was unregistered, her birth date was recorded as 1 July 1937 by the Department of Native Affairs. She was taken from her mother to be raised at the Moore River mission when she was three and a half years old. Her younger sister, Annabelle, was also taken and was told she was an orphan, and over the years distanced herself from her Aboriginal heritage. Doris was reunited with her mother 21 years later.

== Writing ==
Garimara's Follow the Rabbit-Proof Fence is considered a powerful description of the abuses endured by the Stolen Generations. The book was made into an internationally successful film in 2002, directed by Phillip Noyce.

Her follow-up book, Under the Wintamarra Tree, details her own life at Moore River and at the Roelands Native Mission and how she managed to escape by enrolling in a nursing school. Home to Mother is her children's edition of Follow the Rabbit Proof Fence. In the four books, Caprice, a Stockman's Daughter, Follow the Rabbit-proof Fence, Home to Mother, and Under the Wintamarra Tree, Pilkington documented three generations of women in her family.

In 1990, Pilkington's book Caprice: A Stockman's Daughter, the first of the trilogy, won the Queensland Premier's Literary Awards' Unpublished Indigenous Writer – The David Unaipon Award. She was appointed co-patron of Australia's State and Federal Sorry Day committee's Journey of Healing in 2002. In May 2008, she was awarded the $50,000 Red Ochre Award which is made to an indigenous artist for their outstanding, lifelong contribution to Aboriginal and Torres Strait Islander arts at home and abroad.

== Death ==
Pilkington Garimara died of ovarian cancer at age 76 on 10 April 2014 in Perth, Western Australia.

== Awards ==
Pilkington Garimara was posthumously inducted into the Western Australian Writers Hall of Fame in 2022.

=== Australia Council for the Arts ===
The Australia Council for the Arts arts funding and advisory body for the Government of Australia. Since 1993, it has awarded a Red Ochre Award. It is presented to an outstanding Indigenous Australian (Aboriginal Australian or Torres Strait Islander) artist for lifetime achievement.

Year	Nominee / work	Award	Result
2008	Herself	Red Ochre Award	Awarded

== Bibliography ==
- Caprice, A Stockman's Daughter, (UQP, 1991) ISBN 0702224006
- Follow the Rabbit-Proof Fence, (UQP, 1996) ISBN 0702227099
- Under the Wintamarra Tree, (UQP, 2002) ISBN 0702233080
- Home to Mother, (UQP, 2006)

== See also ==
- Martu (Indigenous Australian)
- Rabbit-Proof Fence
- Stolen Generation
