= Aboriginal Protection Board =

Historical Australian government bodies for regulating the lives of Aboriginals

Aboriginal Protection Board, also known as Aborigines Protection Board, Board for the Protection of Aborigines, Aborigines Welfare Board (and in later sources, incorrectly as Aboriginal Welfare Board), and similar names, refers to a number of historical Australian state-run institutions with the function of regulating the lives of Aboriginal Australians. They were also responsible for administering the various half-caste acts where these existed and had a key role in the Stolen Generations. The boards had nearly ultimate control over Aboriginal people's lives.

Protectors of Aborigines were appointed by the Board under the conditions laid down in the various Acts. In theory, protectors of Aborigines were often empowered to undertake legal proceedings on behalf of Aboriginal people, dictate where Aboriginal people could live or work, and keep all wages earned by employed Aboriginals. The exact powers varied over time and by jurisdiction.

As the boards had limited funds, protectors received very limited remuneration. A range of people were appointed as local protectors, including resident magistrates, jail wardens, justices of the peace and, in some cases ministers of religion, though most were local police inspectors. The minutes of the boards show they mostly dealt with matters of requests from religious bodies for financial relief and reports from resident or police magistrates pertaining to trials and convictions of Aboriginal people under their jurisdiction.

Aboriginal protection boards also issued permits to allow Aboriginal people the right to leave their respective missions and reserves and enter the mainstream society for a set period of time.

== History ==
=== Victoria ===
The Central Board Appointed to Watch Over the Interests of the Aborigines was established in 1860. This was replaced by the Victorian Central Board for the Protection of Aborigines in 1869 (via the Aboriginal Protection Act 1869), making Victoria the first colony to enact comprehensive regulations on the lives of Aboriginal Victorians. The board exerted an extraordinary level of control over people's lives including regulation of residence, slavery as employment, marriage, social life and other aspects of daily life.

The Victorian Half-Caste Act of 1886 gave the Board extensive new powers over the lives of Aboriginal people, including regulation of residence, employment and marriage.

In particular, the 1886 Act started to remove Aboriginal people of mixed descent, known as "half-castes", from Aboriginal stations or reserves to force them to assimilate into European society. These expulsions separated families and communities, causing distress and leading to protest. Nevertheless, the board refused to assist the expelled people. It was assumed that the expulsions would lead to the decline in the population of the reserves and their eventual closure.

The Aborigines Act 1910 increased the rights of Aboriginal people in Victoria.

The board was abolished in 1957 by the Aborigines Act 1957.

The Aboriginal Lands Act 1970 gave recognition of Aboriginal people's right to land. Under this Act the deeds of land at the Lake Tyers Mission and Framlingham reserves were transferred to the communities.

=== New South Wales ===
The New South Wales Board for the Protection of Aborigines was established in 1883 and was reconstituted under the Aborigines Protection Act 1909 with wide-ranging control over the lives of Aboriginal people. That included the power to remove children from families because, as stated in many of the files, their parents were Aboriginals, and the power to dictate where Aboriginal people lived, to ensure protection from violent colonialists and provide education in the face of European opposition (McCallum, 2008). The Board also controlled their freedom of movement and personal finances. In particular, Aboriginal children could be removed from their homes and families and taken into care to be raised like white children, becoming the Stolen Generations. The 1911 amendment to the Aboriginal Protection Act established the Kinchela Aboriginal Boys' Training Home and the Cootamundra Domestic Training Home for Aboriginal Girls. Aboriginal children were removed from their families for various welfare reasons and transported to Kinchela and Cootamundra, where they were often abused and neglected while being taught farm labouring and domestic work, many of them ending up as servants in the homes of wealthy Sydney residents.

In 1915, the Aborigines Protection Amending Act 1915 gave the Board authority to remove Aboriginal children "without having to establish in court that they were neglected."

The Board was renamed the Aborigines Welfare Board (which was frequently referred to as the Aboriginal Welfare Board in later sources) in 1940 by the Aborigines Protection (Amendment) Act 1940, which stipulated that Aboriginal people should be assimilated into mainstream white society. It intended that Aboriginal culture would evaporate, and Aboriginal people would eventually become indistinguishable from Europeans. The Board consisted of 11 members, including two Aboriginal people, one "full-blood" and one having "a mixture of Aboriginal blood". It was abolished under the Aborigines Act 1969 (NSW).

After its abolition, the NSW Aboriginal Advisory Council was formed, which advised the NSW Minister for Aboriginal Affairs directly.

=== Western Australia ===
The Western Australian Aborigines Protection Board operated between 1 January 1886 and 1 April 1898 as a statutory authority. It was created by the Aborigines Protection Act 1886 (50 Vict. No. 25 (WA)), also known as the Half-Caste Act, described as An Act to provide for the better protection and management of the Aboriginal Natives of Western Australia, and to amend the Law relating to certain Contracts with such Aboriginal Natives, and the Aborigines Act 1889 (52 Vict. No. 24 (WA)).

The 1886 act was enacted following the furore over the Fairburn Report (which revealed slavery conditions among Aboriginal farm workers) and the work of the Rev. John Gribble. The act introduced employment contracts between employers and Aboriginal workers over the age of 14. There was no provision in the 1886 act for contracts to include wages, but employees were to be provided with "substantial, good and sufficient rations", clothing and blankets. The 1886 act provided a resident magistrate with the power to indenture 'half-caste' and Aboriginal children, from a suitable age, until they turned 21. An Aboriginal Protection Board was also established to prevent the abuses reported earlier, but rather than protect Aborigines, it mainly succeeded in putting them under tighter government control. It was intended to enforce contracts, employment of prisoners and apprenticeships, but there was not sufficient power to enforce clauses in the north, and they were openly flouted. The act defined as "Aboriginal" as "every Aboriginal native of Australia, every Aboriginal half-caste, or child of a half-caste". Governor Broome insisted that the act contain within it a clause permitting traditional owners to continue hunting on their tribal lands.

The effect of the act was to give increasing power to the board over Aboriginal people, rather than setting up a system to punish whites for wrongdoing in relation to Aboriginal people. An Aboriginal Department was set up, under the office of the Chief Protector of Aborigines. Nearly half of the Legislative Council voted to amend the act for contract labour as low as age 10 but it was defeated. McKenzie Grant, the member for The North, claimed that child labour of age six or seven was a necessary commonplace, as "in this way they gradually become domesticated". The attorney general Septimus Burt, in debate on the 2nd reading speech, claimed that contracts were being issued, not for current work, but to hold Aboriginal people as slaves on stations for potential future work, and so prevent them from being free to leave.

In 1898, the board was replaced by the Aborigines Department.

=== Queensland ===
The Queensland Aboriginal Protection Board was established by the Aboriginals Protection and Restriction of the Sale of Opium Act 1897.

=== South Australia ===
The Aborigines Act Amendment Act 1939 created the Aborigines Protection Board in South Australia, which was "charged with the duty of controlling and promoting the welfare" of Aboriginal people (which included anyone descended from an Aboriginal person). Charles Duguid was a founding board member; other board members included J. B. Cleland and Constance Cooke.

=== Decline ===
By the late 1960s, all states and territories had repealed the legislation allowing for the removal of Aboriginal children under the policy of 'protection'.

== See also ==
- Aboriginal Affairs and Northern Development Canada
- Aboriginal reserves
- Bringing them home report (1997)
- British Indian Department
- Wage theft from Indigenous Australians
