= List of acts of the Parliament of Victoria from 1886 =

This is a list of acts of the Parliament of Victoria, Australia for the year 1886.

== 1886 ==
The first session of the thirteenth parliament of Victoria.

Short title, or popular name	Citation	Royal assent
Long title
Municipal Overdrafts (Indemnity) Act 1886 (repealed)	50 Vict. No. 876	16 July 1886
An Act to indemnify the Councillors of various Municipalities for Borrowing Moneys by Overdrafts on Bankers for the purposes of their Municipalities contrary to the provisions of the "Local Government Act 1874" (Note: Local Government Act 1874 (38 Vict. No. 506)) and for other purposes. (Repealed by Local Government Act 1890 (54 Vict. No. 1112))
	50 Vict. No. 877	20 July 1886
An Act to apply out of the Consolidated Revenue the sum of One million six hundred and fifty-three thousand pounds to the service of the year One thousand eight hundred and eighty six and seven.
	50 Vict. No. 878	4 August 1886
An Act to further amend "The Drawbacks Act 1872." (Note: Drawbacks Act 1872 (36 Vict. No. 434)) (Repealed by Customs Act 1890 (54 Vict. No. 1081))
Public Account Advances Act 1886	50 Vict. No. 879	13 September 1886
An Act to apply a Sum temporarily out of "The Public Account" for the Construction of Rolling-stock for the Victorian Railways.
Trades Unions Act 1886 (repealed)	50 Vict. No. 880	27 September 1886
An Act to amend "The Trades Unions Act 1884." (Note: Trades Unions Act 1884 (48 Vict. No. 822)) (Repealed by Trade Unions Act 1890 (54 Vict. No. 1147))
Mining Companies Act 1886 (repealed)	50 Vict. No. 881	18 October 1886
An Act to amend "The Mining Companies Act 1871." (Note: Mining Companies Act 1871 (35 Vict. No. 409)) (Repealed by Companies Act 1890 (54 Vict. No. 1074))
Duties of Customs Act 1886 (repealed)	50 Vict. No. 882	25 October 1886
An Act for granting to Her Majesty certain Duties of Customs, for repealing and altering certain other Duties, and for other purposes. (Repealed by Customs and Excise Duties Act 1890 (54 Vict. No. 1082))
Regulation of Mines and Mining Machinery Act 1886 (repealed)	50 Vict. No. 883	28 October 1886
An Act to amend "The Regulation of Mines and Mining Machinery Act 1883." (Note: Regulation of Mines and Mining Machinery Act 1883 (47 Vict. No. 783)) (Repealed by Mines Act 1890 (54 Vict. No. 1120))
City of Ballarat Municipal Lands and Buildings Act 1886	50 Vict. No. 884	28 October 1886
An Act to enable the Mayor, Councillors, and Citizens of the City of Ballarat to demise for terms of years certain lands vested in them, and for other purposes.
	50 Vict. No. 885	28 October 1886
An Act to apply out of the Consolidated Revenue the sum of One million two hundred and sixteen thousand four hundred pounds to the service of the year One thousand eight hundred and eighty six and seven.
Licensing Act 1886 (repealed)	50 Vict. No. 886	29 November 1886
An Act to extend the time within which Licensed Victuallers must comply with the provisions of section thirty-six of Act DCCCLVII. (Note: Licensing Act 1885 (49 Vict. No. 857)) and to amend the law with regard to the Transfer of Licences under the said Act and for other purposes. (Repealed by Licensing Act 1890 (54 Vict. No. 1111))
	50 Vict. No. 887	13 December 1886
An Act to enable the Trustees of the Queenscliff Public Library to sell and convey certain Land in the Town of Queenscliff, and to expend the proceeds of such sale in the erection of Buildings for a Free Library and Mechanics' Institute and for offices and conveniences connected therewith.
	50 Vict. No. 888	13 December 1688
An Act to provide for reimbursing Members of the Legislative Assembly their expenses in relation to their attendance in Parliament. (Repealed by Constitution Act Amendment Act 1890 (54 Vict. No. 1075))
	50 Vict. No. 889	13 December 1886
An Act to apply out of "The Railway Loan Account 1885" certain sums of money for Railway Works and other purposes.
	50 Vict. No. 890	13 December 1886
An Act to amend the Law relating to the Qualification of Persons entitled to Vote at Elections of Members of Mining Boards. (Repealed by Mines Act 1890 (54 Vict. No. 1120))
Anatomy Act 1886 (repealed)	50 Vict. No. 891	13 December 188
An Act to amend the "Medical Practitioners Statute 1865." (Note: Medical Practitioners Statute 1865 (28 Vict. No. 262)) (Repealed by Medical Act 1890 (54 Vict. No. 1118))
	50 Vict. No. 892	13 December 1886
An Act to further amend "The Building Societies Act 1874." (Note: Building Societies Act 1874 (38 Vict. No. 493)) (Repealed by Building Societies Act 1890 (54 Vict. No. 1068))
Victorian Water Conservation Act 1886	50 Vict. No. 893	13 December 1886
An Act to amend "The Victorian Water Conservation Act 1885." (Note: Victorian Water Conservation Act 1885 (49 Vict. No. 859))
Employers' Liability Act 1886 (repealed)	50 Vict. No. 894	13 December 1886
An Act to extend and regulate the Liability of Employers and to make Compensation for personal injuries suffered by Workmen in their service. (Repealed by Employers and Employés Act 1890 (54 Vict. No. 1087))
	50 Vict. No. 895	16 December 1886
An Act to apply a sum out of the Consolidated Revenue to the service of the year ending on the thirtieth day of June One thousand eight hundred and eighty-seven and to appropriate the Supplies granted in this Session of Parliament.
Water Supply Loans Act 1886	50 Vict. No. 896	16 December 1886
An Act to sanction the issue and application of certain sums of money as Loans for Water Supply in the Country Districts and for other purposes.
	50 Vict. No. 897	16 December 1886
An Act to set apart a Site for a Morgue in the City of Melbourne.
Irrigation Act 1886 (repealed)	50 Vict. No. 898	16 December 1886
An Act to make better provision for the Supply of Water for Irrigation and also for Mining Manufacturing and other purposes. (Repealed by Water Act 1890 (54 Vict. No. 1156))
Sale Canal Act 1886	50 Vict. No. 899	16 December 1886
An Act to authorize the Board of Land and Works to make a Canal from the Borough of Sale to the Thomson River and for other purposes.
Intestate Estates Act 1886 (repealed)	50 Vict. No. 900	16 December 1886
An Act to amend the Law relating to the Curator of the Estates of Deceased Persons and for other purposes. (Repealed by Administration and Probate Act 1890 (54 Vict. No. 1160))
Trade Marks Act 1886 (repealed)	50 Vict. No. 901	16 December 1886
An Act to amend "The Trade Marks Registration Act 1876." (Note: Trade Marks Registration Act 1876 (40 Vict. No. 539)) (Repealed by Trade Marks Act 1890 (54 Vict. No. 1146))
Probate Act 1886	50 Vict. No. 902	16 December 1886
An Act to give effect in Victoria to Probates and Letters of Administration granted in the United Kingdom or any of the other Australasian Colonies.
Expiring Laws Continuance Act 1886	50 Vict. No. 903	16 December 1886
An Act to continue various Expiring Laws.
Statute Law Revision Act 1886 (repealed)	50 Vict. No. 904	16 December 1886
An Act to amend certain Verbal Errors in various Acts of Parliament and for other purposes. (Repealed by Acts Interpretation Act 1890 (54 Vict. No. 1058))
Pounds Act 1886	50 Vict. No. 905	16 December 1886
An Act to further amend the Law relating to the Impounding of Cattle and for other purposes.
	50 Vict. No. 906	16 December 1886
An Act to vest certain Land situate in the Town of Hotham in the Victorian Railways Commissioners and to permanently reserve certain other Land in the said Town of Hotham and for other purposes.
	50 Vict. No. 907	16 December 1886
An Act to remove doubts and to facilitate the prompt disposal of business in County Courts and for other purposes. (Repealed by County Court Act 1890 (54 Vict. No. 1078))
Drainage of Mines Amendment Act 1886 (repealed)	50 Vict. No. 908	16 December 188
An Act to amend the "Drainage of Mines Act 1877." (Note: Drainage of Mines Act 1877 (41 Vict. No. 596)) (Repealed by Mines Act 1890 (54 Vict. No. 1120))
River Goulburn Weir Act 1886	50 Vict. No. 909	16 December 1886
An Act to sanction the issue and application of a certain sum of money for the construction of a Weir in the River Goulburn and works in connexion therewith.
Waterworks Construction Encouragement Act 1886	50 Vict. No. 910	16 December 1886
An Act to encourage private enterprise in the construction of works for the Supply of Water for Irrigation and other purposes.
	50 Vict. No. 911	16 December 1886
An Act to amend the "Discipline Act 1870" (Note: Discipline Act 1870 (34 Vict. No. 389)) and Acts amending the same, and to provide for the better regulation of artillery and rifle practice. (Repealed by Defences and Discipline Act 1890 (54 Vict. No. 1083))
Aborigines Protection Act 1886 (repealed)	50 Vict. No. 912	16 December 1886
An Act to amend an Act intituled "An Act to provide for the Protection and Management of the Aboriginal Natives of Victoria." (Note: Aboriginal Protection Act 1869 (33 Vict. No. 349)) (Repealed by Aborigines Act 1890 (54 Vict. No. 1059))
Mallee (Survey Fees) Act 1886 (repealed)	50 Vict. No. 913	16 December 1886
An Act to further amend "The Mallee Pastoral Leases Act 1883." (Note: Mallee Pastoral Leases Act 1883 (47 Vict. No. 766)) (Repealed by Land Act 1890 (54 Vict. No. 1106))
	50 Vict. No. 914	16 December 1886
An Act to make Temporary Provision for the Issue of Licences to Sell Liquor on Shipboard.
Tramways in Country Districts Act 1886 (repealed)	50 Vict. No. 915	16 December 1886
An Act to sanction the issue and application of certain Sums of Money as Loans to Shires for the Construction of Tramways in country districts. (Repealed by Tramways Act 1890 (54 Vict. No. 1148))

== Sources ==
- "1886 Victorian Historical Acts". AustLII.
