= Mordialloc Aboriginal Reserve =

Aboriginal Reserve in Victoria on the coast of Port Phillip Bay c.1850–1860s

Mordialloc Aboriginal Reserve Mordy Yallock
- Local government area
- Coordinates: 37°59′58″S 145°05′46″E
- Country: Australia
- State: Victoria
- City: Melbourne
- LGA(s): City of Kingston
- Established: 1852

Government
  - Guardian of the Aborigines: William Thomas

Area
  - Total: 337 ha (832 acres)

Population
  - Total(s): 26 (Aboriginal people in 1869)
- Postcode: 3195

Mordialloc Aboriginal Reserve was an Aboriginal reserve on the coast of Port Phillip Bay in Victoria, within the modern-day City of Kingston. It was a remnant of the traditional land of the Bunurong people, to which they gradually retreated from surrounding areas after white settlement from the 1850s. Most of the indigenous residents had moved, or been relocated, to Coranderk by the mid-1860s.

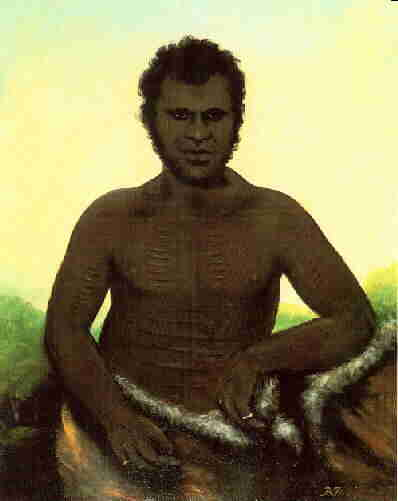
Benjamin Duterrau (1836) Aboriginal chief Derah Mat (Derrimut), a leader of the Boon wurrung clan

== Traditional lands ==
The Boon Wurrung (or Bunurong) peoples of the Kulin nation lived along the eastern coast of Port Philip Bay for over 20,000 years before white settlement. Their mythology preserves the history of the flooding of Port Phillip Bay 10,000 years ago, and its period of drying and retreat 2,800–1,000 years ago. Visible evidence of their shell middens and hand-dug wells remain along the cliffs of Beaumaris, and as scar trees from which bark was taken for canoes along Mordialloc Creek.

The Bunurong first encountered white Europeans when in February 1801 Lady Nelson sailed into Port Phillip and they met crewmen who had landed at what is now Sorrento.

By the 1850s most Bunurong withdrew to the Mordialloc Aboriginal Reserve established in 1852 which encompassed 337 hectares (832 acres) alongside the Mordialloc Creek and Port Phillip Bay. Mordy yallock (yallock meaning 'creek' in Boonwurrung language) was a favourite traditional camping ground with wild fowl in the fens of Carrum Swamp, and where fish came to spawn in the creek, though netting upstream by settlers, officially banned but not enforced, later limited their catch.

== Protectorate ==
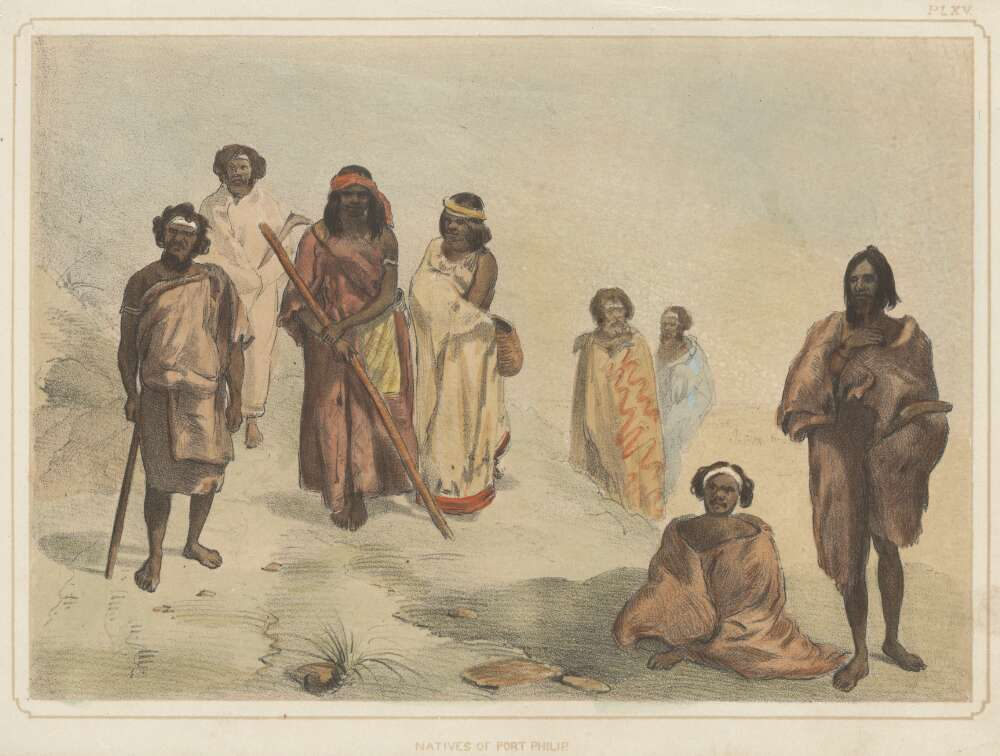
Aboriginal Australians of Port Phillip, Victoria, lithograph from Sketches in Australia and the adjacent islands by Harden S. Melville

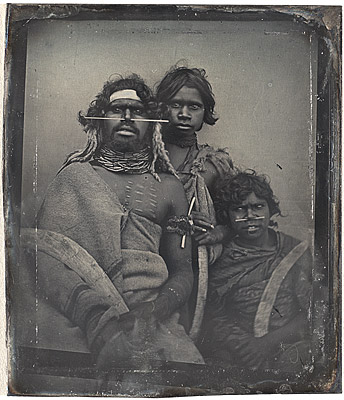
Douglas T Kilburn (Aboriginal man and two companions photographed in Melbourne daguerreotype

William Thomas had been appointed Guardian of the Yarra and Western Port tribes of in 1850, having been Assistant Protector since 1837, and since 1853 was to have regularly supplied them blankets and food, a task he delegated in Mordialloc to a local squatter Mr A. V. Macdonald. Thomas assured the Select Committee of the health of the Boonwurrung people and of their fondness for the Mordialloc Aboriginal Reserve, saying: "...as far as the necessities of life are concerned... They want for nothing."

The area was not, however, for their exclusive use; in the Victorian Legislative Council sitting of October 1858 correspondence was tabled complaining that fishermen at Mordialloc were being charged "about £6 per annum...for tenting on the sands at Mordialloc...in a reserve of land from the Crown for the aborigines..." and in 1861 the reserve was incorporated in the Farmers' Common of 3,220 hectares (7,960 acres).

After widespread reporting that year of the coroner's inquest into the death of indigenous woman Betsy and her newborn infant due to exposure and malnourishment aroused some outrage, George Harris Warren was appointed in March 1862 to be "honorary correspondent" at Mordialloc, reporting on the distribution of food and supplies to the Central Board for Watching over the Interests of the Aborigines that had been established in 1860.

The number of Aboriginal Australians in reserves in Victoria was estimated by the Board on 31 May 1869 to be 1,834, of whom 26 were in Mordialloc. In a dream of his totem the koala, song man Kubaru of the Bunerong Mordialloc tribe envisaged a great disaster to his people, "All gone dead." Nancy and Jimmy Dunbar died in 1877, the last Bunurong people from the Mordialloc camp.

In 1878 the Minister of Lands, in deciding on the application by George Langridge for 4.0 hectares (10 acres) at Mordialloc "believed to have been reserved for an aboriginal reserve", denied that the Lands department had ever allocated it to such purpose.
