= List of acts of the Parliament of Victoria from 1869 =

This is a list of acts of the Parliament of Victoria, Australia for the year 1869.

== 1869 ==
Continuing the second session of the sixth parliament of Victoria.

Short title, or popular name	Citation	Royal assent
Long title
	32 Vict. No. 336	2 March 1869
An Act to apply out of the Consolidated Revenue the sum of Thirty-six thousand four hundred and eighty-five pounds twelve shillings and five pence to the service of the year One thousand eight hundred and sixty-eight, and the sum of Five hundred thousand pounds to the service of the year One thousand eight hundred and sixty-nine.
	32 Vict. No. 337	20 May 1869
An Act to apply out of the Consolidated Revenue the sum of Five hundred thousand pounds to the service of the year One thousand eight hundred and sixty-nin.
	33 Vict. No. 338	19 August 1869
An Act to amend the "Coroners Statute 1865." (Note: Coroners Statute 1865 (28 Vict. No. 253)) (Repealed by Coroners Act 1890 (54 Vict. No. 1077)
	33 Vict. No. 339	19 August 1869
An Act to apply out of the Consolidated Revenue the sum of Six hundred thousand pounds to the service of the year One thousand eight hundred and sixty-nine.
	33 Vict. No. 340	31 August 1869
An Act to sanction the issue and expenditure of certain Sums from "The Public Works Loan Account," for Salaries Wages and Contingencies for the Service of the years One thousand eight hundred and sixty-eight and One thousand eight hundred and sixty-nine.
	33 Vict. No. 341	31 August 1869
An Act to sanction the issue and application of certain Sums of Money from "The Railway Loan Account" for Salaries Wages and Contingencies for the Service of the Year One thousand eight hundred and sixty-nine.
	33 Vict. No. 342	31 August 1869
An Act to amend "The Lunacy Statute." (Note: Lunacy Statute 1867 (31 Vict. No. 309)) (Repealed by Lunacy Act 1890 (54 Vict. No. 1113))
	33 Vict. No. 343	31 August 1869
An Act to amend the law relating to Crimes and the Practice in Criminal Courts.
Lands Compensation Statute 1869 (repealed)	33 Vict. No. 344	31 August 1869
An Act to provide for the mode of procedure in taking and determining the Compensation to be paid for Lands required by the State for Public Works. (Repealed by Lands Compensation Act 1890 (54 Vict. No. 1109))
County Court Statute 1869	33 Vict. No. 345	9 September 1869
An Act to amend and consolidate the Laws relating to County Courts, and to confer on said courts a limited jurisdiction in Equity, Probate, and Administration.
	33 Vict. No. 346	11 November 1869
An Act to amend the Laws relating to the Customs. (Repealed by Customs Act 1883 (47 Vict. No. 768))
Waterworks Commissioners Act 1869 (repealed)	33 Vict. No. 347	11 November 1869
An Act for better carrying out the "Waterworks Act 1865." (Note: Waterworks Act 1865 (29 Vict. No. 288)) (Repealed by Waterworks Act 1880 (44 Vict. No. 656))
North-Eastern Railway Act 1869	33 Vict. No. 348	11 November 1869
An Act to authorize the Construction of a Main Trunk Line of Railway from Essendon to the Upper Murray at Belvoir.
Aboriginal Protection Act 1869 (repealed)	33 Vict. No. 349	11 November 1869
An Act to provide for the Protection and Management of the Aboriginal Natives of Victoria. (Repealed by Aborigines Act 1890 (54 Vict. No. 1059))
Copyright Act 1869 (repealed)	33 Vict. No. 350	11 November 1869
An Act to secure to Proprietors of Designs for Articles and Works of Manufacture and Art and to Proprietors of Works of Literature and Fine Art, the Copyright of such Designs and Works for a limited period. (Repealed by Copyright Act 1890 (54 Vict. No. 1076))
	33 Vict. No. 351	29 December 1869
An Act to apply a sum out of the Consolidated Revenue to the service of the year One thousand eight hundred and sixty-nine and to appropriate the supplies granted in this session of Parliament and for other purposes.
	33 Vict. No. 352	29 December 1869
An Act to sanction the issue and application of a certain Sum of Money from "The Railway Loan Account" for Salaries Wages and Contingencies for the Service of the Year One thousand eight hundred and sixty-nine.
	33 Vict. No. 353	29 December 1869
An Act concerning Claims to Dower affecting certain Lands for the time being subject to the provisions of "The Transfer of Land Statute" (Note: Transfer of Land Statute 1866 (29 Vict. No. 301)) and for other purposes. (Repealed by Transfer of Land Act 1890 (54 Vict. No. 1149))
	33 Vict. No. 354	29 December 1869
An Act to amend the "Mining Companies Limited Liability Act 1864" (Note: Mining Companies Limited Liability Act 1864 (27 Vict. No. 228)) and for other purposes. (Repealed by Mines Act 1890 (54 Vict. No. 1120))
Stamp Statute 1869 (repealed)	33 Vict. No. 355	29 December 1869
An Act to provide for the collection by means of Stamps of Fees payable in the several Courts of Law and Equity and Departments of the Public Service. (Repealed by Stamps Act 1890 (54 Vict. No. 1140))
Abattoirs Statute 1869 (repealed)	33 Vict. No. 356	29 December 1869
An Act to amend the Laws relating to Abattoirs and the Slaughtering of Cattle. (Repealed by Butchers and Abattoirs Act 1890 (54 Vict. No. 1069))
Library Museums and National Gallery Act 1869 (repealed)	33 Vict. No. 357	29 December 1869
An Act to provide for the incorporation and government of the Public Library Museums and National Gallery of Victoria. (Repealed by Libraries Act 1890 (54 Vict. No. 1110))
Shires Statute 1869 (repealed)	33 Vict. No. 358	29 December 1869
An Act to amend and consolidate the law relating to Road Districts and Shires. (Repealed by Local Government Act 1874 (38 Vict. No. 506)
Boroughs Statute 1869 (repealed)	33 Vict. No. 359	29 December 1869
An Act to Amend and Consolidate the Laws relating to Municipal Corporations. (Repealed by Local Government Act 1874 (38 Vict. No. 506)
Land Act 1869 (repealed)	33 Vict. No. 360	29 December 1869
An Act to amend and consolidate the laws relating to the Sale and Occupation of Crown Lands. (Repealed by Land Act 1884 (48 Vict. No. 812)

== Sources ==
- "1869 Victorian Historical Acts". AustLII.
