= List of acts of the Legislative Council of Western Australia from 1886 =

This is a list of acts of the Legislative Council of Western Australia for the year 1886.

== 1886 ==
Short title, or popular name	Citation	Royal assent
Long title
	50 Vict. No. 1	12 July 1886
An Act to confirm the Expenditure for the services of the year One thousand eight hundred and eighty-five, beyond the grants for that year.
Geraldton–Greenough Railway Act 1886	50 Vict. No. 2	12 July 1886
An Act to authorise the Construction of a Railway from Geraldton to Greenough.
Eastern Railway, Spencer's Brook-Northam Branch Act 1886	50 Vict. No. 3	12 July 1886
An Act to authorise the Construction of the Spencer's Brook—Northam Branch of the Eastern Railway.
Cossack–Roebourne Tramway Act 1886	50 Vict. No. 4	12 July 1886
An Act to authorise the Construction of the Cossack-Roebourne Tramway.
	50 Vict. No. 5	
Licensed Surveyors Act 1886	50 Vict. No. 6	
Pearl Shell Fishery Act 1886	50 Vict. No. 7	
	50 Vict. No. 8	
Hawkers Act 1882 Amendment Act 1886	50 Vict. No. 9	
Legislative Council Act Amendment Act 1886	50 Vict. No. 10	
	50 Vict. No. 11	
Opium Duty Act 1886	50 Vict. No. 12	
	50 Vict. No. 13	
Sharks Bay Pearl Shell Fishery Act 1886	50 Vict. No. 14	
	50 Vict. No. 15	
	50 Vict. No. 16	
Magisterial Districts Act 1886	50 Vict. No. 17	
Goldfields Act 1886	50 Vict. No. 18	
Public Health Act 1886	50 Vict. No. 19	
Masters and Servants Amendment Act 1886	50 Vict. No. 20	
	50 Vict. No. 21	
	50 Vict. No. 22	
	50 Vict. No. 23	
Guildford–Greenough Flats Railway Act 1886	50 Vict. No. 24	2 September 1886
An Act to confirm a certain Contract for the construction of a Railway from Guildford to the Greenough Flats, and to amend "The Eastern Railway Extension Act, 1881." (Note: Eastern Railway Extension Act 1881 (44 Vict. No. 18))
Aborigines Protection Act 1886 or the Half-Caste Act	50 Vict. No. 25	2 September 1886
An Act to provide for the better protection and management of the Aboriginal Natives of Western Australia, and to amend the Law relating to certain Contracts with such Aboriginal Natives.
Wines, Beer, and Spirit Sale Act 1880 Amendment Act 1886	50 Vict. No. 26	
Kimberley Districts General Sessions Act 1886	50 Vict. No. 27	
	50 Vict. No. 28	
Federal Council Reference Act 1886	50 Vict. No. 29	
	50 Vict. No. 30	
	50 Vict. No. 31	
	50 Vict. No. 32	
Perth Gas Company's Act 1886	50 Vict. No. 33	16 September 1886
An Act to extend the powers and provisions of 'The Perth Gas Company, Limited,' and to give to the said Company other powers and privileges.
Fremantle Gas and Coke Company's Act 1886	50 Vict. No. 34	16 September 1886
An Act to extend the powers of 'The Fremantle Gas and Coke Company, Limited,' and to make provision for the better carrying on of the business and works of the said Company.

== Sources ==
- "legislation.wa.gov.au".
