= Aboriginal history of Western Australia =

Aboriginal Australians have inhabited Western Australia from around 50,000–70,000 years ago to present.

Prior to European contact, Indigenous Australians in Western Australia primarily recorded their history through oral tradition. Additional information about their history has been uncovered by archaeologists, linguists, and other academic disciplines.

Contact with European settlers in Western Australia had a significant impact on the Aboriginal population. Initial negative impacts included violence through the frontier wars, disease, and displacement from traditional lands. Throughout the 19th and 20th century Aboriginal Australians in Western Australia continued to face discrimination and suffer under policies made by the colonial government, and later the state government.

== Western Australian Aboriginal history ==
=== History prior to European contact (70,000 BCE - present) ===
Aboriginal people of Western Australia practised an oral tradition with no written language before contact with European people.

=== 1829–1881 ===
The early 1840s colonisation of Western Australia by Europeans, under James Stirling, created a generation of colony-born men who engaged in hostilities and imprisonment of Aboriginal people. The colonisation proceeded with the expropriation of land, the exploitation of cheap labour, and the quashing of Aboriginal resistance.

=== 1881–1943 ===
In 1886 an Aboriginal Protection Board was established with five members and a secretary, all of whom were nominated by the Governor, Frederick Broome. Protectors of Aborigines were appointed by the board under the conditions laid down in the Aborigines Protection Act of 1886. In theory, Protectors of Aborigines were empowered to undertake legal proceedings on behalf of Aboriginal people. As the board had very limited funds Protectors received very limited remuneration, and so a range of people were appointed as local Protectors, including Resident Magistrates, Jail Wardens, Justices of the Peace and in some cases ministers of religion, though most were local Police Inspectors. The minutes of the board show they mostly dealt with matters of requests from religious bodies for financial relief and reports from Resident or Police Magistrates pertaining to trials and convictions of Aboriginal people under their jurisdiction.

The 1893 Education Act of Western Australia gave white parents the power to object to any Aboriginal child attending any school also attended by their children, a provision which saw Aboriginal children progressively and completely excluded from the state education system.

In 1897, as part of the Western Australian Government's attempt to gain control of Aboriginal Affairs, the Aborigines Act 1897 abolished the Aborigines Protection Board and established the Aborigines Department. The department operated as a subdepartment of the Treasury, with a very small staff under the Chief Protector of Aborigines, Henry Charles Prinsep. The Act limited the expenditure on Aboriginal welfare to £5000, equivalent to A$861,300 in 2022, per annum rather than the one percent of revenue that was required under the Constitution. This rendered the Act invalid. This was realised in 1904, and the Act was repealed and replaced by the Aborigines Act 1905 on 23 April 1906 as one of the recommendations of the Roth royal commission.

Repeated cuts in finances for the operating budget of the Aborigines Department, partly resulting from the 1905 Aborigines Act, saw this department merged in 1909 to form the Department of Aborigines and Fisheries.

The Aborigines Act 1905 Act created the position of Chief Protector of Aborigines who became the legal guardian of every Aboriginal child to the age of 16 years, and permitted authorities to "send and detain" Aboriginal children in institutions and in "service" (work).

The sixty years from 1881 to the 1940s can be divided into two by the passage of the Aboriginal Act 1905, which resulted in institutionalised racism and created what amounted to Aboriginal "concentration camps" in which the Aboriginal people were to be confined until the race became extinct. It began with the Fairburn Report which first drew attention to the "Aboriginal Problem". This institutionalised racism reached its peak in the 1930s. Children were removed from Aboriginal parents, who were considered "biologically capable of having children, but not socially capable of raising them". This continued beyond this period until well into the 1970s.

=== 1943 to the present ===
This period began with the Great Stockman's Strike of 1946. It, like the other periods, can be divided into two by the events of 1967, in which Aboriginal people were recognised as Australian, and by the passage of the 1975 Racial Discrimination Act, which for the first time since 1829 recognised Aboriginal people as equal under Australian law. The passing of the Mabo and Wik High Court Decisions, which recognised Aboriginal people as in possession of the land at the date of European settlement, is an appendix to these changes. In October 2015, the Recognition Bill 2015, recognising the Noongar people as the traditional owners of Western Australia's southwest, including Perth, was introduced to the state parliament.

In September 2014 the federal government withdrew funding from 180 of the 274 Aboriginal settlements in remote locations in Western Australia, a move to save the government A$45 million, equivalent to A$54 million in 2022, a year.

The Western Australian Barnett Government deregistered 300 Aboriginal sacred sites and proposed shutting 150 of the 276 Aboriginal communities in Western Australia because the costs of providing services were deemed too high.

The "stolen wages" whereby up to 75% of the money earned by Aboriginal workers was seized by the state until 1972 was estimated at A$71 million, despite being previously estimated in 2012 at only A$2.5 million. The Minister for Aboriginal Affairs, Peter Collier was accused of going slow on this settlement, waiting for claimants to die. Gaps continue to increase in child mortality, Aboriginal employment and the difference between Aboriginal and white Western Australian life expectancy.

== Policy and governance ==
Until 1886 dealings with "natives" in Western Australia had been the responsibility of the British Colonial Office.

A Royal Commission on the Administration of Aborigines and the Condition of the Natives chaired by Walter Roth, Chief Protector of Aborigines in Queensland, was conducted in 1904, and discussed the growing "half-caste problem". Most Aboriginal people were living in regional areas, where sexual exploitation of Aboriginal women by whites led to an increasing number of "degenerate" mixed-race children who were subsequently abandoned by their fathers. It led in 1905 to a new Act which extended the definition of Aboriginal to all half-caste children and made all Aboriginal persons as wards of the state with the Chief Protector of Aborigines made legal guardian in place of the parents, with powers to remove children from their parents' care and place them in custodial situations.

As John Drew stated

I think it is our duty not to allow these children, whose blood is half-British, to grow up as vagrants and outcasts, as their mothers are now. There is a large number of absolutely worthless black and half-castes about who grow up to lives of prostitution and idleness; they are a perfect nuisance; if they were taken away from their surroundings of temptation much good might be done with them. There is no power to do this now, consequently a half - caste who possesses few of the virtues and nearly all the vices of whites, grows up to be a mischievous and very immoral subject. This Bill will tend, in a great measure, to remedy this abuse. I may say it may appear to be a cruel thing to tear away an Aborigine child from its mother, but it is necessary in some cases to be cruel to be kind.

The 1911 Aborigines Act Amendment Act significantly extended the Protector's guardianship power to remove Aboriginal children to the "exclusion of the rights of the mother of an illegitimate or half caste child". In that year 200 Aboriginal people had camped on the fringes of Katanning, in order to allow their children to get an education, but under the powers of the 1893 Education Act, parents in 1914 demanded that Aboriginal children be excluded from their school, and in 1915 the Katanning white community, acting on its own, had local police remove the Aboriginal fringe dwellers to what was the equivalent of a concentration camp at Carrolup.

In 1915, the appointment of A. O. Neville as Protector of Aborigines saw a change in policy. He saw the Aboriginal population of Western Australia as comprising two groups

- Full blood, who were to be segregated from the community in order that they could become extinct.
- Half-caste, who were to be assimilated through intermarriage within the white community as quickly as possible.

In 1922 in interests of economy and expediency the Carrolup River Native Settlement was shut and inmates transferred to Moore River Native Settlement near Moora, and the Carrolup land taken over by local farmers.

The Moseley Royal Commission heard evidence in 1934 that the Moore River Native Settlement a "woeful spectacle", buildings over-crowded (by at least 50%), buildings and clothing was vermin ridden, there was no vocational training except for the chores given by staff, the diet lacked all fresh fruit, vegetables, eggs, milk, and health of inmates was seriously affected. Solitary confinement imprisonment of children in the "Boob" was stated to be barbarous and must be stopped. The Commission ruled that in its present condition it had "no hope of success" with the children in its care.

Nevertheless, Neville continued in his role as Chief Protector to argue before the Moseley Royal Commission of 1934 for an extension of his powers, and despite some opposition to this the commission agreed to support his recommendation. In 1936 Sections 8 and 12 of the new Native Administration Act the Chief Protector's guardianship powers were increased still further by a new definition of "native child" to mean any child with any Aboriginal descent, and further widened the scope of the Chief Protector's guardianship and therefore jurisdiction over all Aboriginal people in Western Australia.

A new Native Welfare Act in 1954 did nothing to limit these removal powers under the 1936 Act, which continued unabated. However amendments to the Native Welfare Act in 1963 repealed all previous legislation and abolished the Chief Protector's powers to remove children of Aboriginal descent from their biological parents. Nevertheless, the removal of Aboriginal children continued under the arbitrary implementation of the broad provisions of the Child Welfare Act of 1947.

In 1972 a departmental reorganisation resulted in the functions of the then Native Welfare Department being split between two newly created Departments, the Aboriginal Affairs Planning Authority (AAPA) and the Department of Community Welfare (now the Department for Community Development), responsible for the care and placement of Aboriginal children in the welfare sector. The creation of the AAPA led to a state housing integration program and the end of the Stolen Generation as for the first time policies were enacted which allowed children of Aboriginal descent, considered at risk of neglect, to be fostered first and foremost by other members of their families.

In 1974 the Whitlam government established the Aboriginal Land Fund.

In 2014 the Australian commonwealth government put responsibility for funding essential services in Aboriginal communities back onto the states, but reduced spending by $30 million. Over 330 Aboriginal sacred sites were also removed from the register. Closure commenced for some communities, with power, water and phone lines being cut. An Aboriginal refugee camp was established by the Swan River Noongar Community for Aboriginal people who had become homeless as a result of state government policies.

== Documentation of Western Australian Aboriginal society ==
The documentation of Aboriginal history is challenging, due to the fact that Aboriginal people lived in a pre-literate (or oral) culture before 1827.

=== Anthropology ===
The recording of, and collection of material related to Aboriginal people had not been systematic in the first century of settler-Aboriginal contact.

The most significant collection in the twentieth century was that of Ronald and Catherine Berndt at the University of Western Australia Anthropology department.

More recently the work of historians such as Neville Green has improved the knowledge of Aboriginal society.

Since the European colonisation of Western Australia by the British, there had been relatively few Aboriginal people who had become anthropologists or historians. However at Edith Cowan University, Curtin University and University of Western Australia - centres and individuals have contributed extensively to anthropological and historical knowledge of Aboriginal history and culture.

=== Records ===
The study of Aboriginal history in Western Australia has been enhanced in recent years by people like Lois Tilbrook who have started collecting information and records on key Aboriginal Families in Western Australia. Due to the comprehensiveness of the records of the Department of Native Affairs, more is known about Aboriginal families than about most European families. Anna Haebich has written of the Moore River Native Settlement and the Stolen Generation, which refers to the systemic removal of Aboriginal children from their families for almost a century ending in the late 1960s.

=== Archaeology ===
Advances in archaeology since the 1950s, through the work of such scientists as Sylvia Hallam and Charles Dortch, has increased what is known of the history of Aboriginal people in that area.

==== Cockburn Ranges ====
A diverse array of rock art lies in the east Kimberly in the Cockburn Ranges. These Ranges are within the Balanggarra Native Title determination and are made of large vertical sandstone formations containing many shelters at various elevations. Over fifty rock art sites are documented in this region and stretch from the late Pleistocene to the Holocene. Not only are there large and colourful paintings, but subtractive markings that take the form of figures, non-figures, and tallies. The shelters that contain rock art have traces of human occupation and evidence of children participating in the creation of the rock art. Stencils of hands and feet of many sizes are attributed to children under ten including toddlers.

==== Djadjiling Rockshelter ====
Located in the traditional lands of the Martidja Banyjima people in the Pilbara region, the first occupation of the Djadjiling Rockshelter has been dated to 35,000 BP. This date was determined from the radiocarbon dating of fourteen in situ charcoal samples collected from small hearths. 664 stone artifacts have also been excavated from this site. The stratigraphy shows evidence of repeated site use over thousands of years and supports occupation during the Last Glacial Maximum.

==== Brockman 4 Mining Tenement ====
Excavations of the two sites Juukan-1 and Juukan-2 within the Rio Tinto Brockman 4 mining tenement provide further evidence for occupation of the Pilbara region during the Last Glacial Maximum. Flaked stone, 32 stone artifacts, and 67 animal bone fragments have been excavated from the Juukan-1 rockshelter. Kangaroos, wallaroos, bandicoots, mice, rats, and fish make up the animal bone assemblage. Burn marks and the lack of animal teeth marks on the animal bones are evidence of human activity. 50 metres (160 ft) west of Juukan-1 is the Juukan-2 rockshelter. 272 flaked stone artifacts and 857 animal bone fragments have been excavated. Containing a diverse array of bone, the animal remains assemblage consists of kangaroos, wallaroos, bandicoots, possums, pygmy possums, echidnas, bettongs, mice, rats, skinks, birds, and fish. Several of these bone fragments also show evidence of burning. The dating of these artifacts lends to occupation later than 35,000 BP.

==== West Angelas ====
A grindstone excavated from a rockshelter in the West Angelas region of Pilbara contains residues of a plant strongly suggest that they derive from the plant nardoo. This is a starchy freshwater fern that sometimes requires complex processing techniques. The grindstone from the WARE 14-35-RS rockshelter site was found with grains associated with the processing of nardoo based on the samples taken. Many of the grains recovered from this grindstone were damaged, providing evidence of grinding and processing. While evidence of the consumption of nardoo by Aboriginal people in the Holocene is not common in the Pilbara region, this grindstone is evidence that it did occur on occasion.

==== Yalibirri Mindi Rockshelter ====
Radiometric dating from the Weld Range, Mid West region Yalibirri Mindi rockshelter provides a basal date of 29,089±132 for human occupation. Dating of in situ charcoal samples from hearths and sediment deposits are all consistent with Pleistocene occupation. This data could be interpreted as the Weld Range being a place of refuge during the Last Glacial Maximum. Emu eggshells and faunal remains from a Holocene feature of the rockshelter could indicate a seasonal use based on emu breeding seasons. The evidence of occupation in the Mid West region aligns with evidence from surrounding regions and affirms the knowledge of the Wajarri traditional owners that they have occupied this region since time immemorial.

=== Oral tradition ===
The preservation of Aboriginal history through an oral tradition and stories has increasingly been recognised. Aboriginal coastal dwellers in both the south and the north of Western Australia, not only preserve stories about extinct Australian megafauna, but also preserved stories about the rising sea levels and the loss of lands offshore as a result of the sea level rise of the Flandrian transgression, at the end of the Pleistocene Ice Age.

Aboriginal oral history details accounts of legendary and cultural information, and includes personal biographical accounts. Sally Morgan's My Place was one of the first Aboriginal biographies in Western Australia, and a number of Aboriginal people have started telling the stories of the lives of themselves and their families. The internationally acclaimed Follow the Rabbit-Proof Fence is an example of the autobiographies that have been written since the 1980s.

== See also ==
- Aboriginal cultures of Western Australia
- History of Indigenous Australians
