= Port Phillip Protectorate =

1839 attempt to protect Aborigines

The Port Phillip Protectorate was created in the Port Phillip District by the British House of Commons at the instigation of Lord Glenelg. The primary directives of the Protectors was to protect the Aboriginal people in their districts and to 'civilise' them, in other words to minimize conflicts between European settlers and Aboriginal people, and to help Aboriginal people take up the European way of life.

In 1839 George Augustus Robinson became the Chief Protector of Aborigines and four assistants were appointed to particular regions: William Thomas to the Melbourne and Westernport regions, James Dredge to the Goulburn region, Edward Stone Parker to the Loddon and Northwest District and Charles Sievwright to the Western District.

Within only 10 years the organization crumbled, and was no longer seen to be effective or viable, in December 1849 the Protectorate was abolished.

== See also ==
- Protector of Aborigines
- George Augustus Robinson
