= Aboriginal cultures of Western Australia =

Before the arrival of Europeans, the land now known as Western Australia was home to a diverse range of traditional Australian Aboriginal cultures, spread across numerous language groups, many of which remain today. The border delimiting Western Australia from South Australia and the Northern Territory was drawn by the British colonists, at the 129th meridian east, without regard to the already established boundaries set by the Aboriginal groups of the time. Consequently, some "Western Australian" Aboriginal cultural groupings extend into other states.

== Culture groups ==
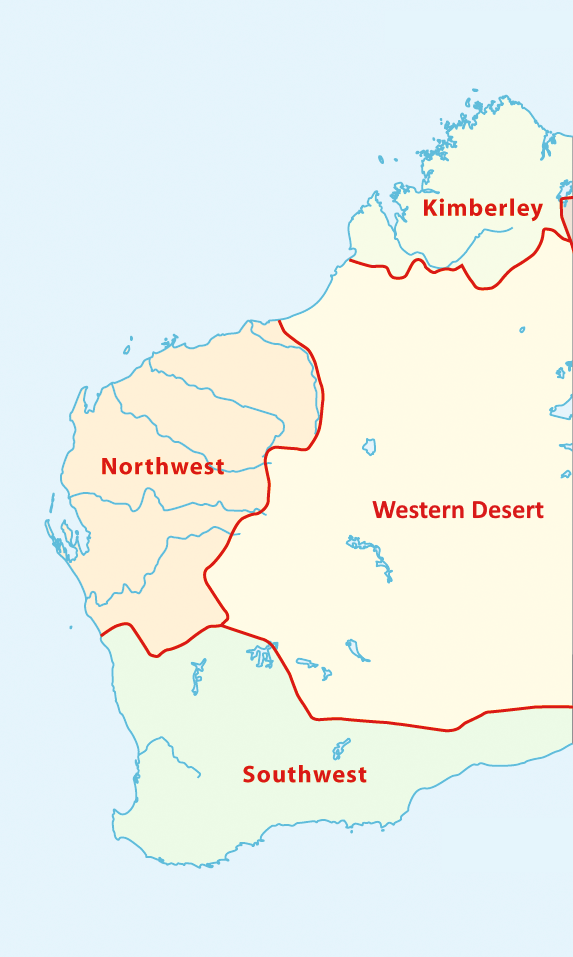
Generalised ranges of the culture blocs of the Aboriginal peoples in Western Australia

Grouping the various peoples of Western Australia, the largest of these groups being called "culture blocs", is a subjective endeavour often done by anthropologists. Groupings have been made without consideration of how the Aboriginal peoples included in the groupings saw themselves, an example of this is the "aggregation of clan groups in north-east Arnhem Land who lack a single name for themselves", but whom Warner collectively labelled the "Murngin".

In Western Australia, some well attested large cultural blocs are: Noongar, Western Desert cultural bloc, Kimberley peoples and Yamatji. Of these, Noongar and Yamatji are (at least post-colonisation) often self-identified, with the former being a cultural system that has existed prior to colonisation. The Western Desert cultural bloc is a dialect continuum containing many communities that before colonisation recognised "their own dialectical affiliations, and [had] no overall term for themselves". The Kimberley peoples are a collection of smaller cultural blocs in the region.

=== Kimberley region ===
The Kimberley region is linguistically complex, containing around 27 languages in 5 language groups. It is also one of the major rock art regions of Australia, as well as being a trading focus of pearl shell, shields, myths, rituals and body paint patterns.

Due to the region's rugged terrain and distance from coloniser population centres, it was one of the last areas to be colonised; graziers began moving in in the 1880s. Colonisation was resisted in "drawn-out guerilla warfare" but still, many massacres continued, coming to a head in the 1920s with what is known as the Forrest River massacre, only then due to the result of public outcry to its atrocities did the treatment of Aboriginal people become "less brutal" in manner.

Aboriginal divers were often central to the region's pearling industry in the 19th century, this being a "major platform for black-white relations".

The peak Indigenous body in the region is the Kimberley Land Council.

=== Noongar region ===
The Noongar people's homeland is the southwest corner of Western Australia. Dialects of the Noongar language were spoken across the region, estimates of the number of dialects range from 3 to 15.

The Noongar people exhibit a distinct material culture. Traditionally this includes wearing stitched kangaroo skin as an adaptation to the cool, moist winter climate, or using a particular style of axe and saw-like knife. Also constructed were temporary but waterproof semicircular dome huts made with a framework of tied branches and paperbark or grass-tree thatch.

Intensive contact with Europeans began in 1825 with the founding of a military base at Mammang Koort (King George Sound) and with the subsequent colonisation of the Swan River area from 1829. By 1840, seven massacres had taken place; this includes the Pinjarra massacre, where fifteen to eighty Pinjarup Noongar people were killed. Pushed off their lands, Aboriginal communities survived around small towns in the southwest while maintaining familial ties across the region.

In 2022, the Noongar people began to be represented by six organisations known as "Noongar Regional Corporations", each representing a different region within Noongar Country. The South West Aboriginal Land and Sea Council, previously the peak native title representative of the region, transitioned to provide administrative, corporate and financial services to the six Noongar Regional Corporations.

=== Western Desert region ===
The Western Desert cultural bloc covers much of Western Australia, as well as parts of South Australia and the Northern Territory, occupying area of approximately 670,000 square kilometres (260,000 sq mi). The Western Desert language is a dialect continuum that extends over much of the region.

A region of low rainfall and temporary rivers. Its aridity was a limiting factor on population densities, with areas of sandy desert potentially varying as low as one person per 200 square kilometres (77 sq mi) to one person per 13 square kilometres (5.0 sq mi) in regions with more permanent water sources. People would gather at permanent water sources in summer and spread out after rain. Waterholes are prominent features of the stories, songs and paintings of the peoples of the region.

Mission stations and pastoral properties greatly affected the Desert peoples who moved into them, creating large population centres, a number of which have come under Aboriginal control. There has also been an extensive outstation movement.

=== Yamatji region ===
Originally a Wajarri word for 'man', it has become a general name for Aboriginal people from the northwest – the Murchison and Gascoyne districts – of Western Australia.

The peak representative body in the region is the Yamatji Marlpa Aboriginal Corporation, which also represents those in the Pilbara.

=== Drainage basins and culture blocs ===
Australia's major drainage basins have been found to correspond with the main culture blocs. This has been explained as a result of the basins' margins being poor in plant, animal and water resources; consequently there is less cultural exchange on their margins than in their interiors. Simultaneously, drainage basins are not understood to be a strong indicator of historical or social similarities, and are instead one of many elements used in the analysis of social and cultural dynamics.

There is also some correspondence between the traditional boundaries of language groups and Australia's bioregions.

== Identity systems found in Western Australia ==
In moiety systems, members of the community take one of two identities, these being based on the identity/moiety of a parent and are known as filial moieties. In matrifilial moieties, the identity of the mother is adopted, while the identity of the father is adopted in patrifilial moieties. Moieties often shared the name of an animal or plant, these becoming one of a person's totems. There are also generational moieties, where, in addition to their filial moiety, a person has the moiety of their grandparents.

In general, moiety systems promoted marriage between certain identities. In patrifilial and matrifilial moieties, a person was meant to marry someone of the opposite moiety (exogamy). While in generational moieties, a person was meant to marry someone of the same moiety (endogamy). (Note: More specifically, they were meant to marry someone "not of his or her parents' or children's (or sibling's children's) generation".) Land and water could also be classified by patrifilial moiety and peoples' roles in ceremonies could be determined by their moieties.

=== Noongar ===
Many of the Noongar peoples divided themselves into filial moieties named manitchmat (western corella people) and wordungmat (Australian raven people). (Note: Manitch being the Noongar name for the western corella, wardong for Australian raven and mat for 'stock', 'family', 'leg'.)

In the southwest, some groups were matrifilial and others were patrifilial. While knowledge of the full system of social categorisation over the entire region has been lost, according to anthropologist Ian Keen the Mineng at King George Sound people were matrifilial.

Fieldwork and interviews conducted in the early 2000s and mid-to-late 2010s has found that while knowledge of an original moiety system is limited, belief in totems remains strong and are a part of contemporary Noongar belief. The moiety system seems to have been replaced by a system that prohibits marriage between close family members, continues to promote totemic exogamy and which has "ideal marriage" rules.

=== Yamatji ===
- Nganda type: Patrilineal totemic local descent groups, no moieties or sections. Includes Nganda and Nandu.
- Inggadi-Badimaia gtype: Sections not well defined, Patrilineal totemic local clans grouped into larger divisions. Includes Inggada, Dadei, Malgada, Ngugan, Widi, Badimaia, Wadjari, and Goara.
- Djalenji-Maia type: Sections correlated with kin terms, Matrilineal descent groups. Includes Noala, Djalenji, Yinigudira, Baiyungu, Maia, Malgaru, Dargari, Buduna, Guwari, Warianga, Djiwali, Djururu, Nyanu, Bandjima, Inawongga, Gurama, Binigura and Guwari.
- Nyangamada type: Sections with indirect matrilineal descent, with patrilineal local descent groups. Includes Bailgu, Indjibandji, Mardudunera, Yaburara, Ngaluma, Gareira, Nyamal, Ngala, and Nyangamada.

=== Wankai ===
Occupying the Goldfields and Nullarbor regions of Western Australia affected from the 1880s onwards, represented today by the Goldfields Land and Sea Aboriginal Council Corporation:

- Galamaia-Gelago type: Like Nyunga, but practising circumcision. Includes Galamaia, Ngurlu, Maduwongga, and Gelago.
- Mirning type: Patrilineal local totemic descent groups, No moieties or sections. Similar to the Western Desert type. Includes Ngadjunmaia, Mirning.

=== Kimberley peoples ===
- Garadjeri type: As for Nyangamada. Includes Garadjeri, Mangala, Yaoro, Djungun, Ngombal, Djaberadjabera, and Nyulnyul.
- Bardi type. Patrilineal local descent groups, no moieties or sections. Includes Warwar, Nimanburu, Ongarang, Djaul Djaui.
- Ungarinyin type: Patrilineal. Includes Umedi, Wungemi, Worora, Wunumbul

== Impact of colonisation ==
Aboriginal traditional cultures have been greatly impacted since the colonisation of Australia began. During the late 19th and early 20th century it was assumed that Aboriginal Australians were a dying race and would eventually disappear.

While the population of Indigenous Australians did decline until the 1930s, it has increased since the 1950s. Today, all Aboriginal cultures have been impacted by degrees of marginalisation and exclusion from participation in the dominant culture of Australia. This has resulted in higher than average rates of infant mortality, and lower life expectancy, education and rates of employment, including a significant gap in pay. Those employed in Aboriginal owned and managed businesses had a higher success rate.

191 Aboriginal languages have been documented in Western Australia, but as of 2018 only 31 were spoken.

In 1972, Western Australia passed the Aboriginal Heritage Act 1972 in order to protect and preserve Aboriginal heritage sites and items. The Aboriginal Cultural Material Committee was established to determine recommendations.

== See also ==
- Aboriginal history of Western Australia
- Timeline of Aboriginal history of Western Australia

== Sources ==
- "AustLang". AIATSIS Collection.
- Berndt, Ronald M.; Berndt, Catherine H. (1980). Aborigines of the West: their past and their present (2nd ed.). Perth: University of Western Australia Press. ISBN 0855641894.
- "Connection to Country". Kaartdijin Noongar. South West Aboriginal Land and Sea Council. 2025. Archived from the original on 23 January 2026.
- Department of the Premier and Cabinet (21 February 2024) [2019]. "Noongar Regional Corporations". Government of Western Australia.
- Department of the Premier and Cabinet (30 July 2025). "South West Native Title Settlement". Government of Western Australia.
- Dousset, Laurent (2011). "Part one: A historical and ethnographic overview". Aboriginal Australian kinship: An introductory handbook with particular emphasis on the Western Desert. Marseille: pacific-credo Publication. p. 14-44. doi:10.4000/books.pacific.561. ISBN 9782956398110.
- Dousset, Laurent (5 April 2018). "Systems in Geography or Geography of Systems? Attempts to Represent Spatial Distributions of Australian Social Organisation". Skin, Kin and Clan: The Dynamics of Social Categories in Indigenous Australia: 43–83. doi:10.22459/SKC.04.2018.03. hdl:1885/204978. ISBN 978-1-76046-163-8.
- Fourmile, Henrieta (May 1996). Making Things Work: Aboriginal and Torres Strait Islander Involvement in Bioregional Planning Consultant's Report. Canberra: Biodiversity Unit, Department of the Environment, Sport and Territories.
- Horton, David (1994a). The Encyclopaedia of Aboriginal Australia: Aboriginal and Torres Strait Islander history, society and culture. Vol. 1. Aboriginal Studies Press. ISBN 0855752491.
- Horton, David (1994b). The Encyclopaedia of Aboriginal Australia: Aboriginal and Torres Strait Islander history, society and culture. Vol. 2.
- Jarvis, N.T., ed. (1979). Western Australia: An Altlas of Human Endeavour 1829-1979. Education Committee. WAY 79. Education Department of Western Australia.
- Keen, Ian (2006). Aboriginal economy & society: Australia at the threshold of colonisation. Oxford: Oxford University Press. ISBN 9780195507669.
- Kimberley Aboriginal Caring for Culture Initial Consultation Report (PDF). 2019.
- Kimberley Land Council (2024). "About Us". Kimberley Land Council.
- McGregor, Russell (1997). Imagined Destinies : Aboriginal Australians and the Doomed Race Theory, 1880-1939. Carlton, Victoria: Melbourne University Press. ISBN 0522847625.
- Memmott, Paul; Long, Stephen (1 March 2002). "Place Theory and Place Maintenance in Indigenous Australia". Urban Policy and Research. 20 (1): 39–56. Bibcode:2002UrbPR..20...39M. doi:10.1080/08111140220131591.
- Mulvaney, John; Kamminga, Johan (2 September 2020). Prehistory of Australia (1 ed.). Routledge. doi:10.4324/9781003136941. ISBN 978-1864489507.
- Nayton, Gaye (2011). The Archaeology of Market Capitalism: a Western Australian Perspective. New York: Springer. ISBN 978-1-4419-8318-3.
- Noongar Boodjar Language Cultural Aboriginal Corporation (2025). "Noongar Dialects". Noongar Boodjar Language Cultural Aboriginal Corporation.
- "Noongar Lore". Kaartdijin Noongar. Archived from the original on 28 February 2019.
- Palmer, Kingsley (2016). Noongar people, Noongar land: the resilience of Aboriginal culture in the South West of Western Australia. Canberra, ACT: Aboriginal Studies Press. ISBN 9781922102478.
- Paterson, Alistair (11 February 2014). "Berndt Museum Rock Art: The Western Desert Collections". Research Data Australia. The University of Western Australia.
- Peterson, Nicolas (1976). Tribes and boundaries in Australia: papers presented at the symposium "Ecology, spatial organisation and process in Aboriginal Australia" held at the Australian National University from the 23-26 October 1973. Canberra: Australian Institute of Aboriginal Studies. ISBN 0855750480.
- Porter, John (1990). Longitude 129 Degrees East, and Why it is not the Longest, Straight Line in the World (PDF). Canberra, A.C.T.: Australian Surveyors Congress (32nd).
- Productivity Commission (14 June 2023). "Aboriginal and Torres Strait Islander Cultures and Languages Are Strong, Supported and Flourishing". Productivity Commission. Australian Government. Archived from the original on 25 March 2025.
- Redmond, Anthony (1 November 2011). "Identifying the Relevant Level of a Society in Australian Native Title Claims". Anthropological Forum. 21 (3): 287–305. doi:10.1080/00664677.2011.617714.
- Robertson, Francesca; Nannup, Noel; Coall, David; McAullay, Dan; Nannup, Alison (2021). Moort: A celebration of a traditional and contemporary Aboriginal family system. ISBN 978-1-74131-369-7.
- Ryan, Lyndall; Debenham, Jennifer; Pascoe, Bill; Smith, Robyn; Owen, Chris; Richards, Jonathan; Gilbert, Stephanie; Anders, Robert J; Usher, Kaine; Price, Daniel; Newley, Jack; Brown, Mark; Craig, Hugh (2017–2025). "Pinjarra Massacre". Colonial Frontier Massacres in Australia, 1780–1930. Newcastle: University of Newcastle.
- Ryan, Lyndall; Debenham, Jennifer; Pascoe, Bill; Smith, Robyn; Owen, Chris; Richards, Jonathan; Gilbert, Stephanie; Anders, Robert J; Usher, Kaine; Price, Daniel; Newley, Jack; Brown, Mark; Craig, Hugh (2017–2025). "Map". Colonial Frontier Massacres in Australia, 1780–1930. Newcastle: University of Newcastle.
- Yamatji Marlpa Aboriginal Corporation (2025). "About Us". Yamatji Marlpa Aboriginal Corporation.
