= Aboriginal reserve =

Place relating to Australian Indigenous peoples

An Aboriginal reserve, also called simply reserve, was a government-sanctioned settlement for Aboriginal Australians, created under various state and federal legislation. Along with missions and other institutions, they were used from the 19th century to the 1960s to keep Aboriginal people separate from the white Australian population. The governments passed laws related to such reserves that gave them much power over all aspects of Aboriginal people's lives.

Protectors of Aborigines and (later) Aboriginal Protection Boards were appointed to look after the interests of the Aboriginal people.

== History ==
Aboriginal reserves were used from the nineteenth century to keep Aboriginal people separate from the white Australian population, often ostensibly for their protection.

Protectors of Aborigines had been appointed from as early as 1836 in South Australia (with Matthew Moorhouse as the first permanent appointment as Chief Protector in 1839). The Governor proclaimed that Aboriginal people were "to be considered as much under the safeguard of the law as the Colonists themselves, and equally entitled to the Privileges of British Subjects". Under the Aboriginal Orphans Ordinance 1844, the Protector was made legal guardian of "every half-caste and other unprotected Aboriginal child whose parents are dead or unknown". Schools and reserves were set up. Despite these attempts at protection, Moorhouse presided over the Rufus River massacre in 1841.

The office of Protector was abolished in 1856; within four years, governments had leased 35 of the 42 Aboriginal reserves in South Australia to settlers.

In 1839 George Augustus Robinson was appointed the first Chief Protector in what is now Victoria.

In the second half of the 19th century, in an attempt to reduce the violence on the frontiers, devastation by disease, and to provide a "humane" environment for Aboriginal people, perceived as a dying race, the colonial governments passed legislation designed to "protect" them. The idea was that by legislating to create certain territory for Aboriginal people, the clashes over land would stop. Officials that the Aboriginal people could farm in their reserves and become less reliant on government rations.

Aboriginal Protection Boards were created in most colonies/states:

- Victoria passed the Aboriginal Protection Act 1869
- Queensland passed the Aboriginals Protection and Restriction of the Sale of Opium Act 1897, for the "better protection and care of the aboriginal and half-caste inhabitants of the colony"; it established the positions of regional Protectors and later Chief Protector. Further amendments and other Acts followed, but the effects were similar, until 1991.
- Western Australia passed the Aborigines Act 1897, abolishing the Aborigines Protection Board and establishing the Aborigines Department.
- In New South Wales, the Aborigines Protection Act 1909 gave the Board for the Protection of Aborigines control of the reserves in New South Wales and the lives of the people who lived there. Amendments to the Act in 1915 gave the APB broad powers to remove Aboriginal children from their families, resulting in the Stolen Generations.
- In South Australia, the protection of the Aboriginal people was mostly left to missionaries from 1856 to 1881 (after the office of Protector was abolished, the work being done by Sub-protectors reporting direct to the Commissioner of Crown Lands), when another Protector was appointed. In 1912, the Aborigines' Office (which had operated under a succession of different ministers) became the Aborigines' Department, initially a change in name only. In 1918, an Advisory Council of Aborigines was appointed under powers given by the Aborigines Act 1911, to take control of the existing missions. The Aborigines Act Amendment Act 1939 abolished the office of Chief Protector of Aborigines and the Advisory Council, and created the Aborigines Protection Board, of which Charles Duguid was a founding member.
- The Northern Territory Aboriginals Act 1910 was an Act of the South Australian parliament, after having made no legislative provision for Aboriginal people in the NT for 47 years, soon before the NT was transferred to federal control. It was repealed by the Aboriginals Ordinance 1918 on 13 June 1918, which combined and replaced the Northern Territory Aboriginals Act 1910 and the Commonwealth Aboriginals Ordinance 1911. These Acts established the Northern Territory Aboriginals Department and created the office of Chief Protector. The department was responsible for the control and welfare of Aboriginal people in the Territory, and under the Act, the Chief Protector was appointed the "legal guardian of every Aboriginal and every half-caste child up to the age of 18 years", and had the power to confine such children to an Aboriginal reserve or institution. The 1939 version of the Ordinance, intended to give effect to the change in policy (from protection to assimilation), did not allow for self-determination either.

== Impact ==
The Aboriginal laws gave governments much power over all aspects of Aboriginal people's lives. They lost what would later be considered basic human rights like freedom of movement, custody of children and control over property. In some states and the Northern Territory, the Chief Protector had legal guardianship over all Aboriginal children, ahead of the parents. These policies were at their worst in the 1930s. "In the name of protection", suggest the authors of the 1997 Bringing Them Home report, "Indigenous people were subject to near-total control". The forcible removal of children from their families led to what became known as the Stolen Generations.

== Examples ==
=== New South Wales ===
Broadly speaking, there were three types of spaces formally set aside by the government specifically for Aboriginal people to live on:

Aboriginal reserves: Aboriginal reserves were parcels of land set aside for Aboriginal people to live on; these were not managed by the government or its officials. From 1883 onwards, the Aboriginal people who were living on unmanaged reserves received rations and blankets from the Aborigines Protection Board (APB), but remained responsible for their own housing. Such reserves included Forster and Burnt Bridge.

Aboriginal missions: Aboriginal missions were created by churches or religious individuals to house Aboriginal people and train them in Christian ideals and to also prepare them for work. Most of the missions were developed on land granted by the government for this purpose. Around ten missions were established in NSW between 1824 and 1923, although missionaries also visited some managed stations. Many Aboriginal people have adopted the term ‘mission’ or ‘mish’ to refer to reserve settlements and fringe camps generally.

Aboriginal stations: Aboriginal stations or ‘managed reserves’ were established by the APB from 1883 onwards, and were managed by officials appointed by that Board. Education (in the form of preparation for the workforce), rations and housing tended to be provided on these reserves, and station managers tightly controlled who could, and could not, live there. Many people were forcibly moved onto and off stations. Managed stations included Purfleet, Karuah and Murrin Bridge near Lake Cargellico.

Many other Aboriginal people did not live on Aboriginal missions, reserves or stations, but in towns, or in fringe camps on private property or on the outskirts of towns, on beaches and riverbanks. There are many such places across the state that remain important to Aboriginal people.

Since 1983, Local Aboriginal Land Councils have managed land and housing in similar and other settings.

See also List of Aboriginal Reserves in New South Wales and List of Aboriginal missions in New South Wales.

=== South Australia ===
Several Aboriginal missions, including Point McLeay (1916) and Point Pearce (1915) became Aboriginal reserves, as recommended by the 1913 Royal Commission on the Aborigines in its final report in 1916. Included in the recommendations was that the government become the legal guardian of all Aboriginal children upon reaching their 10th birthday, and place them "where they deem best". Seven years after the Final Report of the commission, the Aborigines (Training of Children) Act 1923, in order to allow Indigenous children to be "trained" in a special institution so that they could go out and work.

Most of what is now the Anangu Pitjantjatjara Yankunytjatjara (APY lands) was formerly the North-West Aboriginal Reserve.

=== Queensland ===
Before the Aboriginals Protection and Restriction of the Sale of Opium Act 1897, various religious organisations had established a number of mission stations, and the Colony of Queensland government had gazetted small areas as reserves for Aboriginal people to use. Once the Act was passed, all Aboriginal reserves became subject to the Act. For several of these reserves, Superintendents were appointed to carry out the provisions of the Act, and missionaries who had been running Aboriginal settlements also became Superintendents. However, the majority of reserves in Queensland were never "managed" reserves; they had no Superintendent and were usually controlled by the Local Protector of Aborigines.

=== Victoria ===
Victoria had a number of Aboriginal stations and Native Police reserves (run by the colonial government), and missions (run by religious organisations). In 1860, the missions were taken over by the state, becoming stations, though were still often administered by the same religious groups. The stations were run by Superintendents (earlier Assistant Protectors).

The government also operated depots, (run by Guardians) which provided food, clothing and blankets, but not somewhere to live. A number of closed stations were subsequently used as depots.

From 1886, after a contested situation at Coranderrk, the stations were progressively shrunk and closed. Only Lake Tyers and Framlingham were left by the early 1920s. At this time, Framlingham became an unsupervised reserve where many Aboriginal people lived. In 1958 and 1960, two new Aboriginal settlements were built by the government in northern Victoria to provide transitional housing for people living in camps. Within a few years, the residents had chosen to transition to mainstream Housing Commission housing, and the settlements closed. In 1971, Lake Tyers and Framlingham were given to Aboriginal trusts to own and manage.

Established before Protectorate

- Yarra (Tromgin, on the current Royal Botanic Gardens site), 1837–1839
- Nerre Nerre Warren (Westernport Protectorate, Native Police camp, Dandenong Police Paddock), 1837–1853

Established during Protectorate

- Buntingdale (Birregurra, near Colac), 1839–1850
- Tubberubbabel (Westernport Protectorate, Arthurs Seat, near Tuerong), 1839–1840
- Yerrip Hills (Loddon Protectorate, near Sunbury), c.1839–1840
- Neeriman (Loddon Protectorate, near Baringhup), c.1839–1840
- Mitchellstown (Goulburn Protectorate, near Nagambie), 1839–1840
- Goulburn River (Goulburn Protectorate, near Murchinson), 1840–1853
- Kangerong (Westernport Protectorate, near Safety Beach on Brokil Creek), 1840
- Buckkermitterwarrer (Westernport Protectorate, near Dromana on Bald Hill Creek), 1840
- Tarrengower Hill (Loddon Protectorate, near Maldon), 1840–1841
- Franklinford (Loddon Protectorate, Mount Franklin, Mount Franklyn, Jim Crow Hill), 1841–1864
- Merri Creek (Westernport Protectorate, Native Police camp, Aboriginal School, near Fairfield), 1841–1851
- Keilambete (Western Protectorate, Lake Keilambete, near Terang), c.1841
- Lake Terang (Western Protectorate, near Terang), c.1841
- Mount Rouse (Western Protectorate, Penshurst), 1842–1858

Established between Protectorate and Board of Protection

- Warrandyte (on the Yarra River's Pound Bend), 1849–1854
- Pirron Yallock (near Colac), 1849–1855
- Maffra Native Police reserve, 1850–c.1860
- Lake Boga (near Swan Hill), 1851–1856
- Camperdown, 1851–1883
- Mordialloc, 1852–1863
- Yelta (near Mildura), 1855–1868
- Acheron, 1859–1860
- Ebenezer (Lake Hindmarsh, Wimmera, Dimboola), 1859–1906
- Polo Hill (in Mortlake)

Established under Board of Protection

- Mohican (Jones' Station, on the Acheron River), 1860–1863
- Steiglitz (Moorabool and Werribee, Little River, Beremboke, Bacchus Marsh, in the Brisbane Ranges), 1860–1902
- Framlingham (Hopkins River, Warrnambool), 1861–today
- Duneed (Mount Duneed, near Geelong), 1861–1907
- Karngun (near Winchelsea), 1861–1875
- Woori Yaloak (near Lilydale), 1862
- Maffra (Green Hills, Mafra), 1862–1863
- Tangambalanga (near Kiewa), 1862–1873
- Ramahyuck (Lake Wellington, near Bairnsdale and the Avon River), 1863–1907
- Coranderrk (Gracedale, Badger Creek, near Healesville), 1863–1950, 1998–today
- Lake Tyers (near Lakes Entrance), 1863–today
- Chepstowe (near Ballarat on Baillie Creek), c.1865–1901
- Kangerton (near Hawkesdale, north of Warrnambool), 1866–1879
- Lake Condah (between Portland and Hamilton), 1867–1951, 1987–today
- Elliminyt (near Colac), 1872–1948
- Dergholm (Roseneath, near Casterton), 1873–1902
- Gayfield, 1874–1910
- Tallageira (in the Grampians/Gariwerd), 1887–1907
- Wahgunyah (Lake Moodemere, near Corowa), 1891–1937
- Mildura (at Kings Billabong), 1902–c.1909
- Rumbalara (near Mooroopna), 1946–1971, 1982–today

Established by Aborigines Welfare Board

- Manatunga (Robinvale Settlement), 1960–1971, 1991–today

Established by Aboriginal Land Fund Commission

- Baroona (near Echuca), 1977–today
- New Norfolk (in East Gippsland), 1979–?

Established by Victorian Department of Environment, Land, Water and Planning

- Neds Corner, 2022–today

== See also ==
- Indian reservation (United States)
- Indian reserve (Canada)
