= Protector of Aborigines =

Australian government position involved in dealing with indigenous peoples

The Australian colonies in the nineteenth century created offices involved in managing the affairs of Indigenous people in their jurisdictions.

The role of Protector of Aborigines was first established in South Australia in 1836. The role became established in other parts of Australia pursuant to a recommendation contained in the Report of the Parliamentary Select Committee on Aboriginal Tribes, (British settlements.) of the UK's Parliamentary Select Committee on Aboriginal Tribes. On 31 January 1838, Lord Glenelg, Secretary of State for War and the Colonies sent Governor Gipps of NSW the report. The report recommended that protectors of Aborigines should be engaged. They would be required to learn the Aboriginal language and their duties would be to watch over the rights of Indigenous Australians (mostly mainland Aboriginal Australians, but also Torres Strait Islander people), guard against encroachment on their property and to protect them from acts of cruelty, oppression and injustice.

In many colonial, state, territory and similar jurisdictions a chief protector was appointed.

Matthew Moorhouse became the first non-interim Protector of Aborigines in South Australia in 1839. In 1841 he led volunteers who committed the Rufus River massacre, which slaughtered 30 to 40 Aboriginal people. From the 1890s, the role often included social control up to the point of controlling whom individuals were able to marry and where they lived and managing their financial affairs, through legislation like the Half-Caste Act.

A. O. Neville was a notable Chief Protector of Aborigines and later Commissioner of Native Affairs in Western Australia, and was in office from 1915 to 1940. By 1969 all states and territories had repealed the legislation allowing for the removal of Aboriginal children under the policy of protection.

== Protectors of Aborigines ==
Protectors of Aborigines around Australia included the following:

=== New South Wales, FCT/ACT and Jervis Bay ===
The non-government NSW Aborigines Protection Association was established in February 1880, which ran a number of mission stations with the support of the government.

On 29 December 1880, George Thornton was appointed the first NSW Protector of Aborigines, after agitation for such an appointment by the Protection Association. Measures similar to those overseen by chief protectors in other states had previously occurred, usually being organised by either the Chief Secretary (Premier)'s department, or by the police.

- George Thornton, Protector of Aborigines, 1880–1883

The Aborigines Protection Board was established to manage reserves and the welfare of the estimated 9000 Aboriginal people living in New South Wales on 2 June 1883 in the wake of WA's Fairburn Report. It was part of the Department of Police, and apart from its first year, was chaired by the Inspector-General of Police (later known as Commissioner of Police). The Protection Association faded away by the end of the 1890s.

- George Thornton, Chairman of the Aborigines Protection Board, 1883
- Edmund Fosbery, Chairman of the Aborigines Protection Board, c. 1884–1904
- Thomas Garvin, Chairman of the Aborigines Protection Board, 1904–1910

The Aboriginal Protection Act 1909 was enacted in NSW on 1 June 1910. This reconstituted the board. It now reported to the colonial secretary, and had its purpose defined as being "to exercise a general supervision and care over all matters affecting the interest and welfare of Aborigines, and to protect them against injustice, imposition and fraud". It also allowed them to remove children that were deemed to be neglected, and this was very often the case. A chairman continued to be appointed; however, the administrative power was now vested in a dedicated secretary. This regulatory environment remained in the Federal Capital Territory after it was created in 1911, and in the Jervis Bay Territory after its creation in 1915. The Aborigines Protection Amending Act 1915 greatly reduced the requirements needed for Aboriginal children to be removed. The Aborigines Protection (Amendment) Act 1936 extended the powers of the board further, giving them complete control of Aborigines resident in NSW.

- Arthur Charles Pettitt, Secretary of the Board for the Protection of Aborigines, 1909–1916
- LF Ward, Relieving Secretary of the Board for the Protection of Aborigines, c. 1916–c. 1919
- Arthur Charles Pettitt, Secretary of the Board for the Protection of Aborigines, 1919–1940

The Aborigines Protection (Amendment) Act 1940 created the Aborigines Welfare Board in 1940, following two government reviews immediately prior. ACT/JBT regulation was separated from NSW between the enacting of the Aborigines Welfare Ordinance 1954 and the Aborigines Welfare Repeal Ordinance 1965; however the regulating body remained the NSW Board.

- Alfred William George Lipscombe, Superintendent of Aborigines Welfare, 1940–1953
- Maurice Henry Saxby, Superintendent of Aborigines Welfare, 1953–1958
- Harold John Green, Superintendent of Aborigines Welfare, 1959–1969

The Aborigines Welfare Board become the Aborigines Welfare Directorate in 1969 through the Aborigines Act 1969.

- Ian Mitchell, Director of Aboriginal Welfare, 1969–1975

The Directorate was abolished on 1 July 1975, with most of its functions being transferred to the Commonwealth Department of Aboriginal Affairs. The remaining state responsibilities were then transferred to the new Aboriginal Services Branch which operated within the Department of Youth, Ethnic and Community Affairs.

=== Port Phillip and Victoria ===
The first European charged with protecting the Indigenous people of NSW's semi-autonomous Port Phillip District was George Langhorne. He was employed by the district's superintendent as "Missionary" in 1837. He built a mission village at the Aboriginal camp on the Yarra where the Royal Botanic Gardens Victoria now are.

- George Langhorne, Missionary, 1837–1839

Replacing this effort, the Port Phillip Protectorate was established in 1839, overseen by a Chief Protector. Four full-time Assistant Protectors were allocated to a quarter of the district. In 1843, the Port Phillip District was greatly expanded. The Protectorate operated until 1849, when a Select Committee recommended its closure.

- George Augustus Robinson, Chief Protector, 1839–1849
  - James Dredge, Assistant Protector in the Goulburn or Northeast District, 1839–1840
  - Charles Sievwright, Assistant Protector in the Geelong or Western District, 1838–1842
  - Edward Stone Parker, Assistant Protector in the Mt Macedon or Northwest District, 1839–1849
  - William Thomas, [some form of Protector] 1837–1839; Assistant Protector in the Central Protectorate District of Westernport, 1839–1849
  - William Le Souëf, Assistant Protector in the Goulburn or Northeast District, 1840-1844

At the end of the Protectorate, Assistant Protector William Thomas was made "Guardian of Aborigines" starting 1 January 1850, predominantly acting in the Greater Melbourne area. The Port Phillip District became the Colony of Victoria in 1851. His position was a hands-on role that continued after a new administrative structure for protection was created.

- William Thomas, Guardian of Aborigines (in the counties of Bourke, Mornington and Evelyn), 1850–c. 1867

The Central Board appointed to Watch Over the Interests of the Aborigines was established in 1860. (Some contemporary sources call it the Central Board for the Protection of Aborigines). It was headed by a President, who was responsible for its work. It appointed Superintendents in the colony's Aboriginal stations and "Honorary Correspondents" in other areas who worked with the Aborigines being watched over.

This board was replaced by a firmly-named Central Board for the Protection of Aborigines in 1869 (via the Aboriginal Protection Act 1869). This act made Victoria the first colony to enact comprehensive regulations on the lives of Aborigines. The Secretary now not only did the bulk of administrative work of the board, but was credited with making proclamations in public notices. The Chairman and the other Board members directed policy. The General Inspector inspected the Superintendents and their stations. The 1869 Act authorised the removal of neglected Aboriginal children from their families. From the late 1870s, it became customary for the Colonial Secretary (aka Premier) to be the Chairman. By the 1880s, the Honorary Correspondents had been replaced by "Guardians" (later "Local Guardians") operating from "depots".

Prompted by the contested situation at Coranderrk, the Aboriginal Protection Act 1886 gave the board extensive new powers over the lives of Aboriginal people, including regulation of residence, employment and marriage. It was used to release the government station-living "half-castes" aged under 35 into the community. From about 1898, all "half-caste" children on the stations, after leaving school, were given vocational training and sent out to work by the government. The Aborigines Act 1910 re-affirmed that the board had the power to apply all the measures in the 1886 act to "half-castes". The board reduced its administrative function from 1912, it not publishing another annual report until 1922; and it didn't meet at all between 1914 and 1916.

The Aborigines Act 1915 removed most Aboriginal people from the bounds of the board's regulation by removing their Aboriginal status for the purposes of the act. In 1916, the state's Chief Secretary (Premier) Alexander Peacock, asserted his authority as Chairman, and convened the board for the first time in two years. He gave renewed responsibility of the organisation to its Vice-Chairman, who did so under his state government title of Under-Secretary (administrative head of the government). By 1920, the role of "Secretary" had again become the board's face to the public, reporting to a relatively hands-off Vice-Chairman. In 1917 it was decided to close all the stations except that in Lake Tyers, and to encourage all the station dwellers to move there. Most had moved by 1922. Almost all of the Depots had closed by this point. The Aborigines Act 1928 (from 1931) allowed more children and sick adults to live on the stations. In the 1930s, a number of Aboriginal people sought refuge at Framlingham. By the 1940s most people of Aboriginal ancestry were considered by the board to be "legally white", and the board generally only had power over Aboriginal people living at Lake Tyers.

General Inspectors and Secretaries:

- William Thomas, Guardian of Aborigines (in a "General Inspector" role), 1860–1861
- John Green, General Inspector, 1861–1875
- Robert Brough Smyth, Secretary, 1866– c. 1876
- Christian Splidt Ogilvie, General Inspector, 1875; General Superintendent, 1875–1877
- Captain Andrew Mathew Adolph Page, General Inspector and Secretary, 1877–1890
- Friedrich Hagenauer, Acting General Inspector and Secretary, 1889–1890; General Inspector and Secretary, 1890–1906
- William J Ditchburn, Acting Secretary, 1906–1912; Secretary 1912–1917
- Alfred Ernest Parker, Secretary, c. 1918– c. 1936

Presidents and Vice-Chairmen:

- Richard Heales, President of the Central Board appointed to Watch Over the Interests of the Aborigines, 1860–1864
- James MacBain, President of the Central Board appointed to Watch Over the Interests of the Aborigines, 1864–1869
- Theodotus John Sumner, Vice-Chairman of the Central Board for the Protection of Aborigines, 1869– c.1872
- John Mackenzie, Vice-Chairman, c. 1872– c.1875
- William Macredie, Vice-Chairman, c.1875– c.1876
- Frederick Race Godfrey, Vice-Chairman, c.1876– c.1878
- Edward Curr, Vice-Chairman, c.1878– c.1879
- Henry Jennings, Vice-Chairman, c.1879– c.1880
- Albert Le Souëf, Vice-Chairman, c.1880– c.1882
- William Anderson, Vice-Chairman, c.1882– c.1884
- Charles Officer, Vice-Chairman, c.1884– c.1885
- Ewen Cameron, Vice-Chairman, c.1885– c.1887
- Alexander Morrison, Vice-Chairman, c.1887– c.1890
- Charles Officer, Vice-Chairman, c.1890– c.1896
- Alexander Morrison, Vice-Chairman, c.1896– c.1897
- Albert Le Souëf, Vice-Chairman, c.1897– c.1900
- Donald McLeod, Vice-Chairman, c.1900– c.1901
- Charles Officer, Vice-Chairman, c.1901– c.1904
- Frederick Race Godfrey, Vice-Chairman, c.1904– c.1906
- HP Keoh, Vice-Chairman, c.1906– c.1910
- William Alfred Callaway, Vice-Chairman, c.1910–?
- [Vice-Chairmen]
- CS MacPherson, Vice-Chairman, ?– c.1925
- William Philip Heathershaw, Vice-Chairman, c.1925–?
- [Vice-Chairmen]

The Child Welfare Act 1954 was used by police to remove Aboriginal children, without the involvement of the board. In response to dissatisfaction with the shanty towns on the edges of country towns (and overcrowding in Melbourne dwellings), Charles McLean was commissioned by the government to review the Aboriginal people of the state in 1955. The resulting Aborigines Act 1957 replaced the existing Board with the Aborigines Welfare Board. It was empowered to improve the welfare of all the Aborigines of the state. The board was headed by a chairman (a politician with various simultaneous appointments), and had a superintendent as its executive officer. The act also removed the alcohol consumption ban. The Aborigines Act 1958 made minor changes. In 1958, the board established the Rumbalara settlement near Mooroopna to provide transitional housing for people living in camps. In 1960, it opened the similar Manatunga settlement near Robinvale. (The Aborigines (Houses) Act 1959 made it clearer that the board could contract the Housing Commission to build houses on Board land).

After severe criticism, in June 1964 the board lost its executive powers, and became an advisory body to the state government; though it still continued to administer Aboriginal affairs. In June 1965, the board was transferred from the Chief Secretary's Department to the Housing Department, with the Housing Minister gaining the title "Minister in Charge of Aboriginal Welfare". At this time, the Minister was given a similar role to that previously held by the Chairman. The board was now largely devoted to improving Aboriginal housing. A dedicated Minister was appointed in 1967. The board now had an increased focus on education, health and other welfare matters.

- Murray Porter, Chairman, 1956–1961
- Sir John Vincent Dillion, Chairman, 1961
- Edward Meagher, Chairman, 1961–1964
- Arthur Rylah, Chairman, 1964–1965
- James Henry Davey, Chairman, 1965– c. 1968
- Lindsay Thompson, Minister in Charge of Aboriginal Welfare, 1965–1967
- Edward Meagher, Minister in Charge of Aboriginal Welfare, 1967–1968
- Phillip Eric Felton, Superintendent

The passing of the Aboriginal Affairs Act 1967 meant that in 1968, the Ministry of Aboriginal Affairs was established. Approximately 40% of its staff were Aboriginal. In the late 1960s, the residents of Manatunga and then Rumbalara requested that they be transitioned to mainstream housing, and they were. The Aboriginals Land Act 1970 transferred the remaining land at Lake Tyers and Framlingham to Aboriginal trust ownership in 1971.

- Edward Meagher, Minister of Aboriginal Affairs, 1968–1972
- Reginald Maurice Worthy, Director of Aboriginal Affairs, 1968–1974
- Pat Dickie, Minister of Aboriginal Affairs, 1972–1975

In January 1975, the responsibility for Aboriginal affairs passed to the federal government and general Victorian agencies.

=== South Australia ===
In Adelaide's first year, 1836, its Province's first interim Protector was appointed by the Governor with the advice of his Legislative Council, and this practice continued for his replacements. The tasks for the third interim Protector, William Wyatt, were:

1st. To ascertain the number, strength, and disposition of the different tribes, more especially of those in the vicinity of the settled districts.

2nd. To protect them in the undisturbed enjoyment of their proprietary rights to such lands as may be occupied by them in any especial manner.

3rd. To encourage as much as possible the friendly dispositions towards the emigrants which at present exist.

4th. To induce them to labour, either for themselves or the settlers.

5th. To lead them by degrees to the advantages of civilization and religion.

In March 1838, in response to the killing of a Mr Pegler by one or more Aboriginal people, a committee was formed to advise the Protector on his protecting. Of its twelve members, six (including the Protector) were appointed by the governor, while the other six were elected by the colonists. A list of instructions for Protector Matthew Moorhouse (longer than those for Wyatt) was published in 1839. The Aboriginal Orphans Act 1844 empowered the Protector to apprentice out orphan Aboriginal children and, with parental consent, other Aboriginal children until the age of 21. It also gave the Protector the right to visit children and to penalise employers who mistreated the apprentices.

- George Stevenson, Protector of the Aborigines (ad interim), 1836–1837
- Captain Walter Bromley, Protector of the Aborigines (ad interim), 1837
- William Wyatt, Protector of the Aborigines (ad interim), 1837–1839
- Dr Matthew Moorhouse, Protector of the Aborigines, 20 June 1839 – 31 March 1856
  - Edward John Eyre, Sub-Protector on the Murray River, 1841–1847
  - Edward Bate Scott, Sub-Protector on the Murray River, 1848–1857

On Moorhouse's retirement in 1856, the SA government decided that it could no longer justify the expense of having a dedicated "Protector", combining the role with that of the Commissioner of Crown Lands.

- Charles Bonney, Commissioner of Crown Lands and Immigration (as ex-officio Protector), 1 April 1856 – 20 August 1857; 2 September 1857 – 4 July 1859
- William Milne, Commissioner of Crown Lands and Immigration (ex-officio Protector), 21 August 1857 – 1 September 1857; 5 July 1859 – 9 May 1860
- Henry Strangways, Commissioner of Crown Lands and Immigration (as ex-officio Protector), 10 May 1860 – 20 November 1861

In 1860, a Legislative Council Select Committee investigating "The Aborigines" found that a dedicated Protector should again be employed. In 1866, during illness by Protector Walker, his office became known as the Aborigines Office.

- Dr John Walker, Protector of Aborigines, 21 November 1861 – 26 September 1868
- Edward Bate Scott, Acting Protector of Aborigines, 1867

1868 saw Protector Walker die days after a new premier and cabinet were appointed. A political crisis over how to best sell and develop land possessed by Aborigines had just resulted in new government under the control of the strongly "small government" John Hart. It was decided that the Office of Protector should again be absorbed into that of the Commissioner of Crown Lands. According to J. D. Woods in 1879, "With the cessation of the Protectorate of Aborigines as the function of a separate staff, all official interest in the native seems to have expired, and nothing is now done for them except periodically to give to them, through the mounted police, flour, tea, sugar, &c., and even this modicum of generosity is administered in a loose and perfunctory manner, owing to the pressure of more urgent duties on those who are in charge." "There is a Sub-Protector whose duties are centred in Adelaide and are merely clerical [Edward Hamilton], and there is only one other in the Far North [JP Buttfield], who is also a Stipendiary Magistrate."

- William Townsend, Commissioner of Crown Lands and Immigration (as ex-officio Protector), 27 September 1868 – 13 October 1868
- Lavington Glyde, Commissioner of Crown Lands and Immigration (ex-officio Protector), 13 October 1868 – 3 November 1868
- Wentworth Cavanagh, Commissioner of Crown Lands and Immigration (ex-officio Protector), 3 November 1868 – 30 May 1870
- Arthur Blyth, Commissioner of Crown Lands and Immigration (ex-officio Protector), 30 May 1870 – 10 Nov 1871
- William Townsend, Commissioner of Crown Lands and Immigration (ex-officio Protector), 10 Nov 1871 – 22 Jan 1872
- Edwin Derrington, Commissioner of Crown Lands and Immigration (ex-officio Protector), 22 Jan 1872 – 04 Mar 1872
- Thomas Reynolds, Commissioner of Crown Lands and Immigration (ex-officio Protector), 04 Mar 1872 – 22 Jul 1873
- William Everard, Commissioner of Crown Lands and Immigration (ex-officio Protector), 22 Jul 1873 – 03 Jun 1875
- James Boucaut, Commissioner of Crown Lands and Immigration (ex-officio Protector), 03 Jun 1875 – 02 Feb 1876
- Thomas Playford, Commissioner of Crown Lands and Immigration (ex-officio Protector), 02 Feb 1876 – 06 Jun 1876
- John Carr, Commissioner of Crown Lands and Immigration (ex-officio Protector), 06 Jun 1876 – 26 Oct 1877
- Thomas Playford, Commissioner of Crown Lands and Immigration (ex-officio Protector), 26 Oct 1877 – 24 Jun 1881
- Alfred Catt, Commissioner of Crown Lands and Immigration (as ex-officio Protector), 24 Jun 1881 – c. 1882

During much of this period, Edward Hamilton was handling most of the policy and administrative matters relating to Aborigines. In May 1881, it was decided to abolish the small Aborigines Office. This would combine the administrative Sub-Protector position with the "Secretary to the Commissioner of Crown Lands" to become the "Secretary to the Commissioner of Crown Lands and Protector of Aborigines", with protection being a very small part of the role. However, this would not come to pass, and instead Edward Hamilton would be given the title of "Protector of Aborigines" soon afterwards.

- Edward Lee Hamilton, secretary, ? – 4 September 1873; Sub-Protector of Aborigines at Adelaide, 4 September 1873 – c. 1882; Protector of Aborigines, c. 1882 – 30 Jan 1908
- William Garnet South, Protector of Aborigines, 30 Jan 1908 – 1912

Inspired by the Half Caste Acts in WA and Victoria, the Aborigines Act 1911 would greatly increase the control of Aborigines by the state. When enacted in 1912, the "Office" became the Aborigines Department, and the title of "Protector" was changed to "Chief Protector". In 1918, the Advisory Council of Aborigines was established to advise the Chief Protector. It was composed mainly of Protestant clergy, and was largely ignored.

- William Garnet South, Chief Protector of Aborigines, 1912 – 27 May 1923
- Milroy Trail McLean, Acting Chief Protector of Aborigines, 1923
- Francis W Garnett, Chief Protector of Aborigines, 4 Jul 1923 – 9 Oct 1930
- Milroy Trail McLean, Chief Protector of Aborigines, 9 Oct 1930 – 1939

The Aborigines Act 1939 created the Aborigines Protection Board (APB), which was "charged with the duty of controlling and promoting the welfare" of Aboriginal people. The Chief Protector was typically Secretary of the board. Chief Protector Bartlett wrote a book about the Point McLeay mission.

- William Richard Penhall, Acting Chief Protector of Aborigines, 1939; Chief Protector of Aborigines, 27 April 1939 – 1953
- Clarence "Clarrie" Edmund Bartlett, Chief Protector of Aborigines, 1953 – 1962

The Aboriginal Affairs Act 1962 abolished the position of "Protector." The "Chief Protector" role became the "Director of Aboriginal Affairs." The APB was replaced by the Department of Aboriginal Affairs. The act also created an Aboriginal Affairs Board, whose members were chosen by the governor.

- Colin J Millar, Director of Aboriginal Affairs
- John Millar, Director of Aboriginal Affairs

The Department of Aboriginal Affairs became part of the Department of Social Welfare and Aboriginal Affairs in 1970. The latter became the Department of Social Welfare in 1972.

In 2018, the South Australian government established the role of "Commissioner for Aboriginal Children and Young People". At the role's creation, the Premier Stephen Marshall was quoted saying, "In creating this new position, we have established a highly visible and powerful champion for a segment of our community which has been consistently underrepresented in the past."

- April Lawrie, Commissioner for Aboriginal Children and Young People, 2018 – 2025.

==== Other protectors ====
Walter MacDougall and Bob Macaulay were first appointed as "Native Patrol Officers" by the Commonwealth government for the state's rocket and nuclear testing, and were then also appointed as protectors by the SA government.

- JP Buttfield
- Walter MacDougall, 1949–1962
- Bob Macaulay, 1956–1962
- Colin J Millar, 1956–1962, (also Superintendent of Reserves for the APB)

==== List of Protectors of Aborigines ====
Years	Protector	Title / Notes
1836-1837	George Stevenson	Interim
1837	Walter Bromley	Interim
1837-1839	William Wyatt	Interim
1839-1856	Matthew Moorhouse	
1856-1857	Charles Bonney	Position amalgamated with Commissioner of Crown Lands and Immigration
1857	William Milne	Position amalgamated with Commissioner of Crown Lands and Immigration
1857-1859	Charles Bonney	Position amalgamated with Commissioner of Crown Lands and Immigration
1859-1860	William Milne	Position amalgamated with Commissioner of Crown Lands and Immigration
1860-1861	Henry Strangways	Position amalgamated with Commissioner of Crown Lands and Immigration
1861-1868	John Walker	(Edward Bate Scott was Acting Protector in 1867)
1868	William Townsend	Position amalgamated with Commissioner of Crown Lands and Immigration
1868	Lavington Glyde	Position amalgamated with Commissioner of Crown Lands and Immigration
1868-1870	Wentworth Cavanagh	Position amalgamated with Commissioner of Crown Lands and Immigration
1870-1871	Arthur Blyth	Position amalgamated with Commissioner of Crown Lands and Immigration
1871-1872	William Townsend	Position amalgamated with Commissioner of Crown Lands and Immigration
1872	Edwin Derrington	Position amalgamated with Commissioner of Crown Lands and Immigration
1872-1873	Thomas Reynolds	Position amalgamated with Commissioner of Crown Lands and Immigration
1873-1875	William Everard	Position amalgamated with Commissioner of Crown Lands and Immigration
1875-1876	James Boucaut	Position amalgamated with Commissioner of Crown Lands and Immigration
1876	Thomas Playford	Position amalgamated with Commissioner of Crown Lands and Immigration
1876-1877	John Carr	Position amalgamated with Commissioner of Crown Lands and Immigration
1877-1881	Thomas Playford	Position amalgamated with Commissioner of Crown Lands and Immigration
1881-1882	Alfred Catt	Position amalgamated with Commissioner of Crown Lands and Immigration
1882-1908	Edward Hamilton	
1908-1923	William Garnet South	In 1912, the title was changed from Protector of Aborigines to Chief Protector of Aborigines
1923	Milroy Trail McLean	Acting
1923-1930	Francis Garnett	
1930-1939	Milroy Trail McLean	
1939-1953	William Penhall	
1953-1962	Clarence Bartlett	

==== See also ====
- "Survival in our own land: Aboriginal experiences in South Australia since 1836 (Revised Edition)" edited by Christobel Mattingly (1992)
- "A little flour and a few blankets: an administrative history of Aboriginal affairs in South Australia" by Cameron Raynes (2002)
- "South Australian Aborigines Protection Board (1939-1962) and governance through 'scientific' expertise: a genealogy of protection and assimilation" by Margaret Macilwain (2006)
- "Colonialism and its aftermath: a history of Aboriginal South Australia" edited by Peggy Brock and Tom Gara (2017)

=== Northern Territory, North Australia and Central Australia ===
From 1863 to 1911, the Northern Territory was a territory of South Australia. In 1864, the first "Protector of Aborigines" for the Territory was appointed. A public set of instructions for the Protector was published in 1874. For a long time, the Protector was typically also the chief medical officer, coroner and registrar of births, deaths and marriages of the NT.

Protectors of Aborigines:

- Dr Francis Goldsmith, 1864–1865
- Dr Robert Peel, 1865
- Dr James Stokes Millner, 1865–1874
- Dr Samuel Kitching Ellison, acting, 1873
- Dr Robert J Morice, 1877–1884
- Dr Percy Moore Wood, 1884–1889
- Dr Henry Howard Bovill, acting, 1887
- Dr Leonard Smith O'Flaherty 1889–1897
- Dr Frederick Goldsmith, 1897–1904
- Dr Thomas Edward Fraser Seabook, acting, 1902
- Dr Kensington Fulton, 1904–1906
- Dr Cecil Lewis Strangman, 1907–1908
- William George Stretton, 1908–1911
- Fairfax Ingleram Hassard Finniss, acting, 1910

The Northern Territory Aboriginals Act 1910 (passed by the South Australian parliament), created the office of "Chief Protector of Aborigines" and the Northern Territory Aboriginals Department. This department continued after the NT passed to Commonwealth government control in 1911. The powers of the department were then broadened by the Aboriginals Ordinance 1918.

On 1 February 1927, the Northern Territory was split into two territories, North Australia and Central Australia. In 1928, the Health and Aboriginals Branch of the North Australia administration was established. The roles of "Chief Medical Officer" and "Chief Protector of Aborigines" were simultaneously held by Dr Cecil Cook.

On 12 June 1931, the two territories were reunited as the Northern Territory. About this time, the North Australian body became the Northern Territory's Medical Services, Health and Aboriginals Branch, and operated until 1939.

Chief Protectors of Aborigines:

- Dr Herbert Basedow, 1911
- Walter Baldwin Spencer, 1911–1913
- William George Stretton, 1913–1914
- Henry Ernest Carey, 1914–1918
- Roland James Evans, acting, 1917–1918; 1918–1919
- Henry Ernest Carey, 1919–1924
- Nicolas Waters, acting, 1920–1921
- Francis George Burt, acting, 1923–1924
- Major George Vernon Dudley, 1924–1927
- Dr Cecil Cook, North Australia, 1927–1931
- William Lewis Fothergill, acting North Australia, 1930–1931
- Robert Stott, Central Australia, 1927–1928
- Charles Herbert Noblet, Central Australia, 1928–1929
- Dr William Bruce Kirkland, Central Australia, 1929–1931
- Dr Cecil Cook, 1931–1939
- Dr William Bruce Kirkland, acting, 1935, 1936
- Vincent John White, acting, 1937
- Dr William Bruce Kirkland, acting, 1939

In 1939, the Native Affairs Branch was established by the passing of the Aboriginals Ordinance 1939. This heralded a new approach to native affairs under the Lyons government's New Deal for Aborigines, with Ernest Chinnery implementing ideas he had used in a similar role in New Guinea.

Directors of Native Affairs:

- Ernest Chinnery, 1939–1946
- Francis Herbert Moy, 1946–1953
- Reginald Kevin McCaffery, acting, 1953–1954

The Welfare Branch replaced the Native Affairs Branch in 1954. This occurred as a result of the passing of the Welfare Ordinance 1953. This combined with the Wards Employment Ordinance 1953 removed many restrictions on people that were applied because they were deemed "half-castes", but now provided the NT government the power to apply the same restrictions on anyone they saw fit. They saw fit to apply these restrictions to all Aboriginal people. The Welfare Branch was reorganised, and operated as the Welfare Division from 1970 to 1972.

Director of Welfare:

- Harry Giese, 1954–1972

The Commonwealth Department of Aboriginal Affairs was created on 19 December 1972. The work of the Welfare Division was absorbed by this department (and those of Health and Education) from 1972 until 1974. In 1974 the social welfare function was transferred to the Department of the Northern Territory.

==== Other protectors ====
Other protectors included:

- Rev John Francis Gilbart Huthnance (Roper River)
- T. A. Bradshaw (Alice Springs)
- J. R. B. O'Sullivan (Daly River)
- Private S. Roy Burston
- Dr Mervyn J. Holmes
- James Thornton Beckett
- James Harcourt Kelly
- Robert McDonald
- Xavier Herbert, late 1920s?
- William Edward Harney, 1940–1947

=== Queensland ===
The Aboriginals Protection and Restriction of the Sale of Opium Act 1897 was enacted to improve the life of Aboriginals through the control of their lives. To action this, the offices of Northern Protector of Aboriginals and Southern Protector of Aboriginals were created in 1898. They continued until 1904. Frances Meston, the wife of the first Southern Protector, provided protective services to Aboriginal women without payment. This was recognised through the creation of the paid role "Protector of Aboriginals (Female)" in 1899.

On 25 March 1904, the Office of the Chief Protector of Aboriginals was created. Queensland was divided into protectorates, of which there were 95 by 1932, each administered by a local Protector of Aboriginals (usually a police officer). The local protectors were responsible to the Chief Protector of Aboriginals. Other regulatory changes were also made. From 1908, Thursday Island's indigenous population came under the control of the Government Resident instead of a local Protector.

J. W. Bleakley (1879–1957) became Queensland's Chief Protector of Aboriginals in 1914. He was well known across Australia for his knowledge of Aboriginal welfare. After Charles Duguid, South Australian social reformer and founder of the Aborigines' Protection League, had petitioned prime minister Stanley Melbourne Bruce, Bleakley was asked in 1928 by the Commonwealth Government to conduct an inquiry into the welfare into Aboriginal people in central and northern Australia. This has been referred to as the Bleakley Inquiry, and his report, published in January 1929, often referred to as the Bleakley Report, was officially titled "Report on the Territory, The Aboriginal and Half-Castes of Central Australia and North Australia". The report was the result of on interviews with informed people in Sydney, Melbourne, and Adelaide, including Ngarrindjeri man David Unaipon. The report was critical of race relations, finding poor living conditions, lack of payment for work, and poorly funded and run government institutions caused hardship. One of his recommendations was that responsibility for Indigenous children should be handed over to missions. Reforms were subsequently considered and discussed in government conferences. However, owing to a change of government, which was strongly influenced by farmers, and the arrival of Great Depression in Australia, they were put aside. However one outcome of his report is that it played a key role in the 1931 creation of a government-run Aboriginal reserve in Arnhem Land.

In 1933, the Protector of Aboriginals (Female) resigned and was not replaced.

The Office was succeeded by the Director of Native Affairs Office on 12 October 1939 (after the Aboriginals Preservation and Protection Act 1939 and Torres Strait Islander Act 1939 were passed). Bleakley remained the head of this department until 1942.

The department was superseded by the Aboriginal and Island Affairs Department on 28 April 1966, (due to the passing of the Aboriginal and Torres Strait Islanders Affairs Act 1965).

The Aborigines Act 1971, in force from 1972 until 1984, legislated the conduct of Aboriginal reserves, and who was allowed to reside in them.

On 16 Jan 1975 the name of the department was changed to the Aboriginal and Islander Advancement Department (AIAD). Previous administrations had emphasised protection and preservation of the Aborigines through assimilation into the broader white community; later a policy of equality with the white community was implemented whereby, instead of seeking "exemption" from the provision of the Act, people had to apply for a "Certificate of Entitlement" in order to come under the Act.

The AIAD was abolished (and the Aborigines Act 1971 was repealed) when the Community Services (Aborigines) Act 1984 and the Community Services (Torres Strait) Act 1984 were passed. These acts later became the singular Aboriginal Communities (Justice and Land Matters) Act 1984 and later the Aboriginal and Torres Strait Islander Communities (Justice, Land and Other Matters) Act 1984 (which remains in force as of 2024).

Protectors of Aboriginals:

- Archibald Meston, Southern Protector of Aboriginals, 1898–1903
- Dr Walter Roth, Northern Protector of Aboriginals, 1898–1904; Chief Protector of Aboriginals, 1904–1906
- Richard Baron Howard, Acting Chief Protector of Aboriginals, 1904–1905; Chief Protector of Aboriginals, 1906–1914
- John William Bleakley, Chief Protector of Aboriginals, 1914–1939; Director of Native Affairs, 1939–1942
- Cornelius O'Leary, Director of Native Affairs and Protector of Islanders, 1942–1963
- Patrick Killoran, Director of Native Affairs, 1963–1966; Director of Aboriginal and Islander Affairs, 1966–1975; Director of the Department of Aboriginal and Islanders Advancement, 1975–1984

Protectors of Aboriginals (Female):

- Margaret Frances Prowse Meston, 1899–1900
- Mary Easter Frew, 1900–1906
- Mary Evelyn McKeown, 1906–1909
- Katherine Angela Whipham, 1909–1912
- Nurse Emily Beeston, Acting, 1910; Protector, c. 1912–1916
- Nurse Annie Eleanor Sullivan, 1916–1933

=== Western Australia ===
Concerns about the outcomes of interaction between Western Australian Aborigines and European settlers led to the creation of two Protector of Aborigines positions in 1839. One position was based in Perth, and the other in York.

- Captain Gayner, Protector of Aborigines, 1839–1840
- Charles Augustus John Symmons, Protector of Aborigines (Perth), 1839–1858
- Peter Barrow, Protector of Aborigines (York), 1840–1841
- Rivett Henry Bland, Protector of Aborigines (York), 1841–1848
- Walkinshaw Cowan, Protector of Aborigines (York), 1848–1858
- Thomas Newte Yule, Acting Protector of Aborigines (York), 1855

The two Protector roles were abolished at the end of 1858 because it was thought that there was then good concord between the Aborigines and the Europeans of the colony. In particular, the Europeans were now making fewer complaints.

In 1882, the concerns of people like John Gribble led to the WA Government commissioning the Fairburn Report into the welfare of Aborigines. This revealed slavery of Aborigines on European-run farms and other abuses.

The Aborigines Protection Act 1886 was passed in response. It made it illegal for employers to employ an Aborigine with there being an independently witnessed written contract. The contract could be no longer than 12 months. It also required employers to provide these contracted employees with food, clothing, blankets and annual leave. But there was no requirement for monetary payment. The act also aimed to greatly increase government control over the lives of Aborigines, particularly those deemed to be "half-castes". The Aborigines Protection Board was established in 1887 to achieve the act's aims. The board employed a number of local protectors across the state to afford protection. The Aborigines Act 1889 made further changes.

- Malcolm Fraser, Chairman of the Aborigines Protection Board, 1887–1891
- Octavius Burt, Acting Chairman of the Aborigines Protection Board, 1890
- Tim Hooley, Chairman of the Aborigines Protection Board, 1891–1892
- George Walpole Leake, Chairman of the Aborigines Protection Board, 1892–1896
- Dr Alfred Waylen, Chairman of the Aborigines Protection Board, 1896–1898

The Aborigines Act 1897 replaced the board with a new Chief Protector of Aborigines and the Aborigines Department from 1 April 1898. The department was given further powers by the Aborigines Act 1905. The Chief Protector was the legal guardian of every Aboriginal child in Western Australia to the age of 16 years with the power to remove Aboriginal children from their families and place them in Homes or in "service" (work).

The Moseley Royal Commission was set up in 1934 to examine proposals to extend the powers of the Chief Protector, and the policy of removal of children from their parents. Agitation by critics, and the resulting media coverage in London, and locally, had drawn attention to the welfare of Aborigines in the state. A series of submissions detailed accusations of child slavery, abuse and mistreatment, and evidence was given by mothers of children who had been removed from them. The commission produced a report citing problems with the current policy, and concluded that the recommendations of Chief Protector Neville be followed.

In response, the Native Administration Act 1936 made changes. The department was renamed the Department of the Native Affairs, and the department's Commissioner was now the legal guardian of every Aboriginal person in Western Australia to the age of 21 years. The Child Welfare Act 1947 allowed for Indigenous children to be made "wards of the state" and be outside of these powers.

The Native Welfare Act 1954 evolved this department into the Department of Native Welfare. From 1963, the Commissioner ceased to be guardian of Aboriginal young people, and instead became responsible for their "custody, maintenance and education". The department became part of the multiracial Department of Community Welfare in 1972.

- Henry Charles Prinsep, Chief Protector of Aborigines, 1898–1907
- Charles Frederick Gale, Chief Protector of Aborigines, 1907–1915
- Auber Octavius Neville, Chief Protector of Aborigines, 1915–1936; Commissioner of Native Affairs, 1936–1940
- Francis Illingworth Bray, Commissioner of Native Affairs, 1940–1947
- Charles Lewis McBeath, Acting Commissioner of Native Affairs, 1947–1948
- Stanley Guise Middleton, Commissioner of Native Affairs, 1948–1955; Commissioner of Native Welfare, 1955–1962
- Frank Ellis Gare, Commissioner of Native Welfare, 1962–1972

=== Tasmania ===
The Committee for the Care and Treatment of Captured Aborigines was established by Governor Arthur in 1829. It soon became known as the Aborigines Committee. In February 1831, its member George Augustus Robinson was appointed to a paid position by the government "with a view of opening an amicable intercourse friendly communication with the whole of the black population of this Island". This task soon became rounding up Tasmania's remaining indigenous population, and confining them to the Wybalenna Aboriginal Establishment on Flinders Island. Deemed to have finished this task in 1835, he then became the Establishment's Superintendent.

The Cape Barren Island Reserve Act 1912 made the Secretary for Lands, "charged with the duty of promoting the welfare and well-being of the residents of the Reserve, and of carrying out the provisions of this Act". This reserve was understood to be where all Tasmanians of Aboriginal ancestry lived. The 1912 Act was replaced by the Cape Barren Island Reserve Act 1945, under which no-one was charged with the protection of its residents.

- Edward Albert Counsel, Secretary for Lands (and charged under the relevant Act), 1912–1924
- William Nevin Hurst, Secretary for Lands, 1924–1938
- Colin Mackenzie Pitt, Acting Secretary for Lands, 1938; Secretary for Lands (and charged under the relevant Act), 1939–1945

=== Papua and New Guinea ===
The Territory of Papua was given by the UK to Australia in 1902. It established a Department of Native Affairs and Control in 1910.

The Territory of New Guinea was captured from Germany by Australia during World War I. The League of Nations granted it to Australia as a League of Nations mandate in 1919. It appointed a Protector of Natives in 1921, who was made the head of a new Department of Native Affairs in 1922.

The Native Administration Regulations, 1924 were enacted in New Guinea and the Native Regulations, 1939 were enacted in Papua in their respective years.

Papua:

- Bertram William Bramell, Commissioner of Native Affairs and Control, 1910–1922
- Leslie Livingstone Bell, Acting Commissioner of Native Affairs and Control, c. 1912; Commissioner of Native Affairs and Control, 1922–1926
- James Thomas O'Malley, Commissioner of Native Affairs and Control, 1926–1940

New Guinea:

- Henry Clare Cardew, Protector of Natives, 1921–1922; Commissioner of Native Affairs, 1922–1928
- Ernest Chinnery, Commissioner of Native Affairs, 1928–1932; Director of District Services and Native Affairs, 1932–1939
- Robert Melrose, Director of District Services and Native Affairs, c. 1939–c. 1945

World War II (1939-1945) disrupted the administration of the two territories greatly. After the war, a single Department of District Services and Native Affairs administered both territories. The Papua and New Guinea Act 1949 officially brought together the two colonies under a single administration, though they retained separate legal systems.

In 1950, regulations were made restricting natives from being on the street in towns between 9pm and 6am, unless they had permission from their employer or the police. Also that year, the Native Labour Ordinance 1950 was enacted, determining how native people could be employed. Both were administered by the Director.

- Edward Taylor, Acting Director of District Services and Native Affairs, 1945–c. 1947
- Bert Jones, Acting Director of District Services and Native Affairs, c. 1947; Director of District Services and Native Affairs, 1948–1953
- Ivan Champion, Acting Director of District Services and Native Affairs, 1949–1951
- Albert Allen Roberts, Director of District Services and Native Affairs, 1953–c. 1960
- John Keith McCarthy, Director of Native Affairs, 1960–c. 1964

In the mid 1960s, the Department of Native Affairs became the Department of District Administration, gaining a more general service delivery focus as the territory was moving towards independence.

== See also ==
- Bureau of Indian Affairs
- Indian Agent (Canada)
- Indian Agent (United States)
- Department of Aboriginal Affairs (Western Australia)
