= Letters from Victorian Pioneers =

Letters from Victorian Pioneers, with fuller title: A series of papers on the early occupation of the colony, the Aborigines, etc. is a collection of letters from early Victorian settlers, edited by librarian Thomas Francis Bride (1849–1927) and first published in 1898. The papers, addressed to Lieutenant-Governor Charles Joseph La Trobe, describe the colony's early settlement and interactions with Aboriginal peoples, including reports by the Australian settler William Thomas (1794–1867). The work has been republished several times and remains a key source on Victoria's colonial history and Aboriginal relations.

== See also ==
- Colony of Victoria

== Editions ==
- Bride, Thomas Francis, editor: Letters From Victorian Pioneers. A series of papers on the early occupation of the colony, the Aborigines, etc. Addressed by Victorian Pioneers to His Excellency Charles Joseph La Trobe. Melbourne, Robt. S. Brain, Government Printer, 1898 (first edition)
- Sayers, C.E. (ed.): Letters from Victorian pioneers : being a series of papers on the early occupation of the colony, the Aborigines, etc. addressed by Victorian pioneers to His Excellency Charles Joseph La Trobe, Lieutenant Governor of the colony of Victoria. Heinemann 1969
- Letters from Victorian pioneers. A series of papers on the early occupation of the Colony, the Aborigines, etc. Edited with an introduction and notes by C. E. Sayers. Foreword by Helen Vellacott. Melbourne, Lloyd O'Neil, 1983
