= Half-Caste Act =

1890s Australian laws removing mixed-race Aboriginal children from their families

Half-Caste Act was the common name given to acts of Parliament passed in 1886 in the colony of Victoria (Aborigines Protection Act 1886) and the colony of Western Australia (Aborigines Protection Act 1886). They became the model for legislation to control Aboriginal people throughout Australia: Queensland's Aboriginals Protection and Restriction of the Sale of Opium Act 1897; NSW/ACT's Aboriginal Protection Act 1909; the Northern Territory Aboriginals Act 1910; South Australia's Aborigines Act 1911; and Tasmania's Cape Barren Island Reserve Act 1912.

The various related acts allowed the seizure of children who were "half-caste" (a term for mixed race now deemed offensive) and their forcible removal from their parents. This was theoretically to provide them with better homes than those afforded by typical Aboriginal people, where they could grow up to work as domestic servants, and also for social engineering. The removed children are now known as the Stolen Generations.

These acts were a major impetus for a a 1967 referendum on the status of Indigenous Australians. Some of the controls first created by the acts remained in place until the early 1970s.

== Victoria ==
Aborigines Protection Act 1886

Parliament of Victoria
- Long title: An Act to amend an Act intituled "An Act to provide for the Protection and Management of the Aboriginal Natives of Victoria."
- Citation: 50 Vict. No. 912
- Royal assent: 16 December 1886

Repealed by
- Aborigines Act 1890
- Status: Repealed

The Victorian Aborigines Protection Act 1886 (50 Vict. No. 912 (Vic)) was an extension and expansion of the Aboriginal Protection Act 1869, which gave extensive powers over the lives of Aboriginal people in the colony of Victoria to the Board for the Protection of Aborigines, including regulation of residence, employment, custody of children and marriage.

The 1886 act enabled the expulsion of Aboriginal people of mixed descent ("half-castes") aged from eight to 34 from the Aboriginal reserves. This was intended to incorporate them into mainstream European society. These expulsions separated families and communities, causing distress and leading to protests. The expulsions and other policies led to a decline in the population of the reserves, and for much of their land to be sold or leased to European settlers. By 1926 all Victorian Aboriginal reserves had been closed except for Lake Tyers in Gippsland which had a population of about 250.

== Western Australia ==
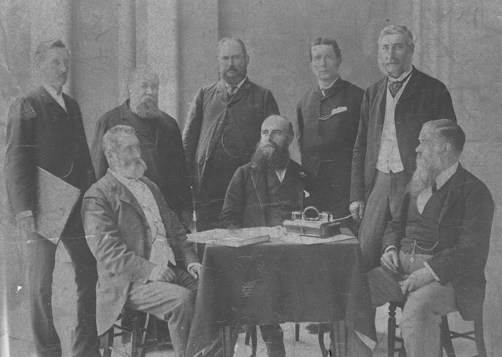
Gov. Broome (seated center) and the last Executive Council before the responsible government in Western Australia, c.1890.

The Western Australian Aboriginal Protection Board was established in 1886, with five members and a secretary, all of whom were nominated by the Governor, by the Aborigines Protection Act 1886 (50 Vict. No. 25 (WA)), or Half-Caste Act.

The Aborigines Protection Act 1886 was enacted following the furore over the Fairbairn Report of 1882, which revealed slavery conditions among Aboriginal farm workers, and the work of Rev. John Gribble. The act introduced employment contracts between employers and Aboriginal workers over the age of 14. There was no provision in the act for contracts to include wages, but employees were to be provided with "substantial, good and sufficient rations", clothing, and blankets. The act provided a resident magistrate with the power to indenture 'half-caste' and Aboriginal children from a suitable age until they turned 21. An Aboriginal Protection Board was also established to prevent the abuses reported earlier, but rather than protect Aborigines, it succeeded mainly in putting them under tighter government control. It was intended to enforce contracts, employment of prisoners, and apprenticeships, but there was not sufficient power to enforce clauses in the north, and they were openly flouted. The act defined "Aboriginal" as "every Aboriginal native of Australia, every Aboriginal half-caste, or child of a half-caste". Governor Frederick Broome insisted that the act contains within it a clause permitting traditional owners to continue hunting on their tribal lands.

The effect of the act was to give increasing power to the Aboriginal Protection Board over Aboriginal people, rather than setting up a system to punish whites for wrongdoing in relation to Aboriginal people. An Aboriginal Department was set up under the office of the Chief Protector of Aborigines. Nearly half of the Legislative Council voted to amend the act for contract labour as low as 10, but it was defeated. McKenzie Grant, the member for The North, claimed that child labour of 6 or 7 was a necessary commonplace, as "in this way they gradually become domesticated". The Attorney General Septimus Burt, in the debate on the second-reading speech, claimed that contracts were being issued not for current work but to hold Aboriginal people as slaves on stations for potential future work to prevent them from being free to leave.

== Aboriginal Protection Boards ==
Protectors of Aborigines were appointed by the board under the conditions laid down in the various acts. In theory, Protectors were empowered to undertake legal proceedings on behalf of Aboriginal people, dictate where Aboriginal people could live or work, and keep all wages earned by employed Aboriginal people.

As the boards had limited funds, Protectors received very limited remuneration and so a range of people were appointed as local Protectors, including resident magistrates, jail wardens, Justices of the Peace and in some cases ministers of religion, but most were local police inspectors. The minutes of the board show that they dealt with mostly matters of requests from religious bodies for financial relief and reports from Resident or Police Magistrates pertaining to trials and convictions of Aboriginal people under their jurisdiction.

Aboriginal Protection Boards also issued permits to allow Aboriginal people the right to leave their respective missions and enter mainstream society for a set period of time.

== Impact ==
These two acts became the model for legislation to control Aboriginal people throughout Australia, including Queensland's Aboriginals Protection and Restriction of the Sale of Opium Act 1897; NSW/ACT's Aboriginal Protection Act 1909; the Northern Territory Aboriginals Act 1910; South Australia's Aborigines Act 1911; and Tasmania's Cape Barren Island Reserve Act 1912.

The various related acts allowed the seizure of enabled the forcible removal of "half-caste" children (i.e. mixed race children; a term now deemed offensive) from their parents. This was theoretically to provide them with better homes than those afforded by typical Aboriginal people, where they could grow up to work as domestic servants, and also for social engineering. "Half-caste" people were distinguished from "full-blood" Aboriginal people.

These acts were a major impetus for a 1967 referendum question. Some of the controls first created by the acts remained in place until the early 1970s.

== See also ==
- Aboriginal history of Western Australia
- History of Indigenous Australians
- History of Western Australia
- Indian Act (Canada)
- Stolen Generations
- Detraditionalization
- Detribalization
