= Aboriginals Protection and Restriction of the Sale of Opium Act 1897 =

Parliament of Queensland
- Long title: An Act to make Provision for the better Protection and Care of the Aboriginal and Half-caste Inhabitants of the Colony, and to make more effectual Provision for Restricting the Sale and Distribution of Opium.
- Status: Repealed

The Aboriginals Protection and Restriction of the Sale of Opium Act 1897, was an act of the Parliament of Queensland. It was the first instrument of separate legal control over Aboriginal peoples, and was more restrictive than any contemporary legislation operating in other states. It also implemented the creation of Aboriginal reserves to control the dwelling places and movement of the people.

Amendments and various pieces of replacement legislation were passed in the 20th century, but it was not until passage of the Aboriginal Land Act 1991 and Torres Strait Islander Act 1991 that the main features of the 1897 Act regarding control of land and people were replaced.

== Background ==
By the late 19th century, many in Queensland believed that the Aboriginal peoples, greatly reduced in number because of dispersal, malnutrition, opium use, and infectious diseases, were a "dying race". Under pressure from the community, the Government of Queensland, commissioned Archibald Meston to assess the issue. Meston made a number of recommendations, some of which were the basis for the Aboriginals Protection and Restriction of the Sale of Opium Act 1897. Though the Act's creators considered it a solution to a short-term problem, its administrators used it as a device for social engineering and control.

Public servants rather than politicians oversaw much of the decision-making. The individual appointed protectors for various communities had substantial autonomy in how they implemented the Act.

The act was influenced by the "Half-Caste Acts" (Note: Referring to mixed race people; a term now deemed offensive.) of Victoria and Western Australia (both passed in 1886).

== Effect ==
The act could be used to justify definitions of Aboriginality, but even with the help of the Act, they were often contradictory and generally subject to interpretation or variation throughout the first decades after Federation. For example, in 1905, Queensland's Chief Protector of Aboriginals cited the Act to define a "half-caste" as "Any person being the offspring of an aboriginal mother and other than an aboriginal father – whether male or female, whose age, in the opinion of the Protector, does not exceed sixteen, is deemed to be an aboriginal". The Chief Protector described a "quadroon" as the "offspring" of a half-caste woman, by a "white, &c." (presumably other non-Aboriginal) father.

This was the first instrument of separate legal control over Aboriginal people in Australia. According to historian Henry Reynolds, it "was far more restrictive than any [contemporary] legislation operating in New South Wales or Victoria and implemented a system of tight controls and closed reserves".

== Amendments and repeal ==
Definitions were no clearer 15 years later. The Queensland Aboriginals Department referred to "European half-caste mothers" in its 1920 Report alongside "half-breeds", "half-castes", and Aboriginals, and did not expand upon how the department made the distinction between a half-breed and half-caste, a native, and an Aboriginal. Where no other information was available, white observers judged degrees of ancestry. At least in Queensland, once it had bestowed a racial category upon its charges, the Aboriginals Department treated its subjects according to their variations in skin colour.

The 1897 Act was amended in 1899, 1901, 1928, and 1934. In 1939 the Aboriginals Preservation and Protection Act 1939 and the Torres Strait Islanders Act 1939 repealed previous legislation, with the main difference being a slight redefinition of racial classifications. A 1946 amendment, like the previous versions, served only to strengthen the provisions of the Act.

The Aborigines' and Torres Strait Islanders' Affairs Act 1965 repealed the 1939 Act, and provided for the management of reserves and welfare for Indigenous persons (both Aboriginal and Torres Strait Islander people). Under this legislation, protection as a policy was abandoned. The new policy of assimilation began. The Act retained many elements of control of Indigenous people. Under this legislation, the Queensland Department of Aboriginal and Islander Affairs was created.

With the Aborigines Act 1971 and the Torres Strait Islanders Act 1971, the government stated an intention to improve the development of the reserves, and also the welfare system through its policy of assimilation. But, significant legal restrictions on the movement and activities of the people living on reserves remained.

All of these were very similar in intent and effect to the original 1897 legislation. The decision in Mabo v Queensland [No 1] (1988) overturned an attempt by the Queensland government to legislate (through the Aboriginal Land Act 1991 and the Torres Strait Islander Act 1991) to prevent any subsequent recognition of Indigenous land claims due to its inconsistency with the Racial Discrimination Act 1975. Those land rights were recognised by the High Court in the case of Mabo v Queensland [No 2] (1992) and by Parliament with the Native Title Act 1993.
