= Constance Mary Ternent Cooke =

Church worker and women's rights advocate

Constance Mary Ternent Cooke MBE
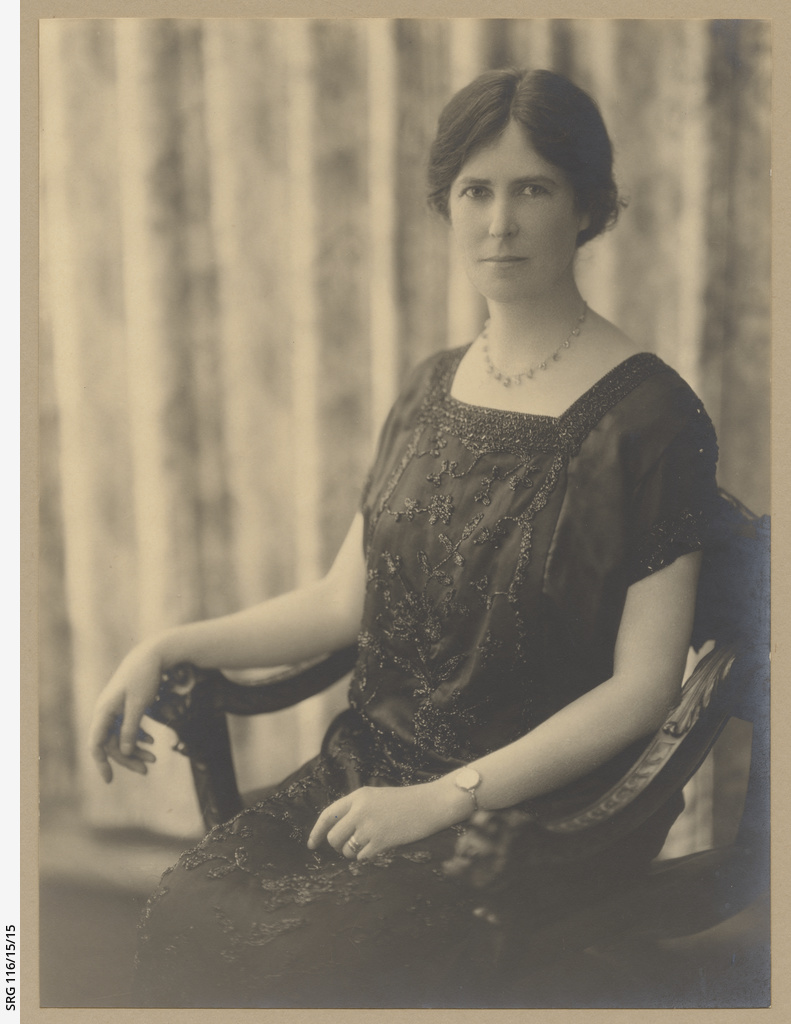
- Born: Constance Hoare; 9 February 1882; Kent Town, South Australia
- Died: 2 April 1967 (aged 85); Turramurra
- Other name: Constance Ternent-Cooke
- Occupation: Indigenous rights activist

Constance Mary Ternent Cooke MBE (9 February 1882 – 2 April 1967) was an Australian Indigenous rights activist.

== Early and family life ==
Constance Mary Ternent Cooke was born the fifth child of Sussette (née Gameau) and Percival Edward Hoare. She and her sisters were educated at home.

Between 1898 and 1902, Cooke taught at the Somersal House Preparatory School, Stepney. The school was supervised by her second cousin Constance Mary Benham.

On 21 August 1907, Cooke married Dr William Ternent Cooke. Her husband was a professor at the University of Adelaide and was president of the Royal Society of South Australia in 1943. The couple had two children, a son and a daughter.

== Activism ==
Cooke argued that Indigenous issues should be understood within the context of Indigenous culture and society. Her activism in this area has been critiqued by Anna Cole as a feminised form of racialism, which is understood through the concept of white feminism. On a 1926 fact-finding visit to Central Australia and the Hermannsburg Mission, Cooke was shocked at the Indigenous peoples' living conditions.

Cooke served for three years as the president of South Australia's Women's Non-Party Association (WNPA). The WNPA was formed in 1909 as the Women's Political Association. The name was changed to the Women's Non-Party Political Association before ending on the WNPA. It was wound up in 1979 to allow the Women's Electoral Lobby to continue the work. As a member of the WNPA, Cooke was appointed the convenor of the Aborigines’ welfare committee. In 1929 with assistance from the WPNA, she became the second woman appointed to the Advisory Council of Aborigines. Ida McKay had been appointed in 1927. The work of Cooke, McKay and the WNPA resulted in the inclusion of legislation protecting indigenous girls and women in the 1939 Aborigines Act.

In 1927, Cooke was appointed a Justice of the Peace in South Australia. She was known for her interest in social reform, particularly for women and children. In 1927, Cooke represented Australia at the British Commonwealth League Conference, London which was convened to consider the condition and status of non-English people in British countries and territories. At this conference, Cooke presented a paper on the Indigenous women of Australia.

In August 1930, Cooke was a delegate at the Pan-Pacific Union Conference in Honolulu representing the Australian Federation of Women Voters.

Cooke was appointed MBE in 1964 for her work for Aboriginal protection and welfare.

== Death ==
In 1957, Cooke moved to Sydney after the death of her husband, to be near to her family. She died at Turramurra, Sydney in 1967.
