= South West Aboriginal Land and Sea Council =

Aboriginal land council in Western Australia

The South West Aboriginal Land and Sea Council (SWALSC) is the organisation that represents the Noongar people, the Aboriginal Australians of the southwest corner of Western Australia. It was formed in 2001, and is incorporated under the Corporations (Aboriginal and Torres Strait Islander) Act 2006. The Council's primary role is to assist the Noongar people with native title claims and Indigenous land use agreements. It also helps support Noongar culture and heritage, and publishes the Kaartdijin Noongar ("Noongar Knowledge") website.

== South West Native Title Settlement ==
The comprehensive South West Native Title Settlement for Noongar people in Western Australia aims to resolve native title claims in exchange for statutory recognition of the Noongar people as the traditional owners of south-Western Australia. As of 2020 it is the largest native title settlement in Australian history, affecting about 30,000 Noongar People and encompassing around 200,000 km^{2} (77,000 sq mi) in south-western Western Australia. It has been described as "Australia's first treaty".

The Noongar (Koorah, Nitja, Boordahwan) (Past, Present, Future) Recognition Act 2016 recognises Noongar ownership, and the settlement includes six individual Indigenous Land Use Agreements (ILUAs). On 19 December 2019, the Federal Court upheld the Native Title Registrar’s decision to register the six ILUAs, and settlement is expected to begin in the second half of 2020.
