= Moseley Royal Commission =

Royal commission held in Western Australia about the treatment of Aboriginal people

The Moseley Royal Commission, officially titled the Royal Commission Appointed to Investigate, Report and Advise Upon Matters in Relation to the Condition and Treatment of Aborigines was a Royal Commission established by the Government of Western Australia in 1934 to hear evidence regarding the treatment of Aboriginal people.

The commission was named for the author of its final report, magistrate Henry Doyle Moseley.

== A. O. Neville ==
The Royal Commission was set up to examine proposals to extend the powers of A. O. Neville, the "Chief Protector of Aborigines", and the social policy of removal of children from their parents. Agitation by critics, and the resulting media coverage in London, and locally, had drawn attention to the Native Administration Act 1905–1936 (WA) Amendment (1911), and to actions by Neville.

A series of submissions detailed accusations of child slavery, abuse and mistreatment, and evidence was given by mothers of children who had been removed from them. The commission produced a report citing problems with the current policy, but concluded that the recommendations of Neville be followed.

== See also ==
- Stolen Generations
