= Northern Territory Aboriginals Act 1910 =

The Northern Territory Aboriginals Act 1910 was an Act of the South Australian parliament (Act no. 1024/1910), assented to on 7 December 1910. The long name of the Act was "An Act to make Provision for the better Protection and Control of the Aboriginal Inhabitants of the Northern Territory, and for other purposes", and it established the Northern Territory Aboriginals Department and created the office of Chief Protector of Aborigines. On 1 January 1911, the Northern Territory was transferred from South Australia to federal government control. The 1910 Act was repealed by the federal government's Aboriginals Ordinance 1918 on 13 June 1918, which nevertheless carried forward many of the provisions of the 1910 Act. A 1939 amendment replaced the position of Chief Protector with Director of Native Affairs.

The Welfare Ordinance 1953 repealed the Aboriginals Ordinance 1918, coming into force in 1957, along with the Wards Employment Ordinance 1953, together making all Aboriginal people in the Territory wards of the state, with the government having control over many aspects of their lives. With this act, the new position of Director of Welfare replaced the Director of Native Affairs.

Each of these laws gave the state the power to place children in institutions, which contributed to the situation of people later dubbed part of the Stolen Generations. The 1953 Ordinances were repealed by the Social Welfare Ordinance 1964, which removed many of the restrictions over the lives of Aboriginal people.

== Description ==
The Northern Territory Aboriginals Act 1910, long name "An Act to make Provision for the better Protection and Control of the Aboriginal Inhabitants of the Northern Territory, and for other purposes", was an Act of the South Australian parliament (Act no. 1024/1910), assented to on 7 December 1910. On 1 January 1911, the Northern Territory was transferred from South Australia to federal government control.

The Act established the Northern Territory Aboriginals Department and created the office of Chief Protector of Aborigines. The department was responsible for the control and welfare of Aboriginal people in the Northern Territory. Under the Act, the Chief Protector of Aborigines was appointed the "legal guardian of every Aboriginal and every half-caste child up to the age of 18 years", and had the power to confine such children to an Aboriginal reserve or institution. The Act provided the legal basis for enforcing segregation. That is, Indigenous children could be removed by Administrative order, whereas non-Indigenous children at the time could only be removed by order of a Court.

The Act allowed for regulations to be made for the "care, custody and education of the children of aboriginals". This included the power to transfer children to "aboriginal institutions" and "industrial schools". The Act was the first and only legislation passed in South Australia which related to Aboriginal people in the Northern Territory.

== Aboriginals Ordinance 1918 ==
The Act was repealed by the Aboriginals Ordinance 1918 (Act No. 9/1918) on 13 June 1918, which combined and replaced the Northern Territory Aboriginals Act 1910 and the Commonwealth Aboriginals Ordinance 1911. The 1918 Ordinance was amended 18 times over the following decades, and was eventually repealed by the Welfare Ordinance 1953.

Many of the provisions of the 1910 Act carried forward into the 1918 Ordinance, including the power to transfer Aboriginal children into institutions.

Under the Aboriginals Ordinance 1918, the Chief Protector was also given total control of all Indigenous women regardless of their age, unless married to a man who was "substantially of European origin", and his approval was required for any marriage of an Indigenous woman to a non-Indigenous man.

Between 1918 and 1921, large areas of the Territory and adjacent states were classified as Aboriginal reserves and sanctuaries for remaining nomadic populations who had hitherto had little contact with white Australia. In 1920, the area including Uluru, in Anangu territory, was declared an Aboriginal Reserve under the Aboriginals Ordinance.

The Aboriginals Ordinance 1939 changed the title and position known as Chief Protector of Aborigines to "Director of Native Affairs".

=== 1953 Amendment ===
In 1953, the Aboriginals Ordinance 1953 (Act no. 7/1953) amended the Aboriginals Ordinance 1918 empowering the Director of Native Affairs with legal guardianship of all "aboriginals", thus making them wards of the state. There was a change in definition of "aboriginal" in this amendment, in that it excluded reference to "half-caste".

== Welfare Ordinance 1953 ==
From 1951, Paul Hasluck, the Commonwealth Minister for Territories, was responsible for drafting a new bill. This became the Welfare Ordinance 1953 (Act No. 16/1953), which repealed the Aboriginals Ordinance 1918 and its amendments, was passed on 15 July 1953, but did not commence until 13 May 1957. Under this Act, the position of Director of Native Affairs was replaced by a Director of Welfare, who still exerted as much control over the lives of Aboriginal people as his predecessors. At the same time, the Wards Employment Ordinance 1953 was enacted, although this too did not come into operation until 1957.

The 1953 Ordinance was different from the 1918 Ordinance in that it did not once refer to any racial category, avoiding the term "Aborigines" altogether within its text. It has been seen as part of his model for cultural assimilation of Aboriginal people into the white population. It was clear that the provisions applied to Aboriginal people though, by specifying that nobody who was entitled to vote could be declared a ward; at the time, this meant that it could only apply to Aboriginal people. The Director had authority over the property of all wards, his consent was needed for wards to marry, and wards were not allowed to live with a "non-ward" unless they were related. The Director could authorise police to remove children from their parents, and put children into institutions, including interstate.

Two high-profile cases attracted widespread criticism of these ordinances. One was the a man called Mick Daly, charged with cohabiting with a ward, Gladys Namagu, when they wanted to marry (see: Mick Daly and Gladys Namagu). The other was the conviction of famous artist Albert Namatjira for supplying alcohol to a ward, as he had been (against his wishes) been given an honorary exemption from the Register of Wards. Namatjira appealed against the conviction to the Supreme Court of the Northern Territory (with his defence supported by the Council for Aboriginal Rights in Victoria). The Supreme Court upheld the conviction but reduced the sentence from six to three months. The High Court of Australia refused an application to appeal, and there was widespread sympathy for Namatjira and negative publicity about the operation of the Ordinance both at home and abroad.

The law was never properly debated in Parliament, and only finally lost its force after Aboriginal people gained franchise rights in both Commonwealth and Northern Territory in 1961. There were several amendments to the Welfare Ordinance 1953 (each named "Welfare Ordinance [yyyy]") before it was repealed by the Social Welfare Ordinance 1964 (Act no. 31/1964) on 15 September 1964, which had much fewer restrictions over Aboriginal people.

== See also ==
- Kruger v Commonwealth (1997), in which the High Court found that the 1918 Ordinance was beneficial in intent
- Stolen Generations
