= James Dredge (minister) =

English methodist preacher

James Dredge (1796–1846) was an English Wesleyan Methodist preacher, Assistant Protector of Aborigines at Port Phillip in Australia.

Dredge gave up his position as Assistant Protector, which he considered misconceived: secular and possibly set up to fail. He was a preacher at Geelong from 1842 to 1846.

In poor health, Dredge was returning to England when he died on the ship.
