= William Thomas (Australian settler) =

Australian settler and advocate of Aboriginal causes

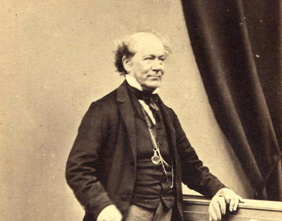
- William Thomas, 1860

Protector of Aborigines of Victoria
- In office 1 January 1850 – 31 December 1859

Assistant Protector of Aborigines of Port Phillip
- In office 21 December 1837 – 31 December 1849

Personal details
- Born: 29 April 1794 Westminster, London, England, UK
- Died: 1 December 1867 (aged 73) Melbourne, Victoria
- Spouse: Susannah Thomas née Jackson
- Children: William Jackson Thomas

William Thomas (29 April 1794 – 1 December 1867) represented Aboriginal people in various roles in the Port Phillip district (now known as the state of Victoria) in Australia.

== Early life ==
William Thomas was born on 29 April 1794 in Westminster, London. His father was an officer in the British army under Sir Ralph Abercrombie and died in the Battle of Alexandria in 1801. Thomas's formal education was concluded at 21 with a year on the continent, spent mainly in Spain and Gibraltar. With little capital or prospects for patronage, he founded a successful school located in Southwark on the Old Kent Road in south-east London. There he trained young men for entry to the civil service. Thomas's achievements as an educator and his devout Methodism brought him to the attention of the post-Reform Act government.

== Assistant Protector ==
Thomas was one of four Assistant Protectors of Aborigines appointed by Lord Glenelg, Colonial Secretary of State, in the Port Phillip district then part of the New South Wales colony. Under directions from Sir George Grey, Thomas arrived in Sydney with his family on 3 August 1838. He was appointed a Justice of the Peace for the colony, having jurisdiction in both New South Wales and Victoria. He later served as a magistrate for Melbourne and its suburbs. As Assistant Protector, Thomas served under George Augustus Robinson, and was responsible for the Central Protectorate District Westernport regions that included the Wurundjeri (Yarra) and Boon wurrung (coastal Port Phillip and Westernport) peoples. During his tenure he learnt both the Woiwurrung and Boonwurrung language, and translated Psalm 121, the Creed, the Lord’s Prayer and the first chapter of Genesis into Boonwurrung. He was known by the people of his protectorate as "Marminata" (Good Father).

== Guardian of the Aborigines ==
The Protectorate ended in 1849. Thomas stayed in government service with his appointment of Guardian of the Aborigines though arrangement with La Trobe for the counties of Bourke and Mornington and Evelyn. His influence and advocacy saw a later appointment as Adviser on Aboriginal Affairs which he held until a few months before his death on 1 December 1867.

== Legacy ==
Thomas left an important written record that has attracted much scholarship. In the public record this material comprises official reports, letters and submissions to parliamentary enquiries. In addition, his private papers give "a rare insight into the process of cultural continuity and collapse, and the agency of Victorian Aboriginal leaders in social and economic interactions with settlers and colonial administrations in a time of great social upheaval".

== Archives ==
- The Mitchell Library: official returns; personal journals and diaries
- The La Trobe Library Collection of the Papers of Assistant Protector William Thomas
- The Public Record Office, Laverton, Victoria: reports and returns — monthly, quarterly and half-yearly

== Family ==
Thomas married Susannah Jackson, with her father Abraham Jackson as witness. William and Susannah Thomas had nine children, only 3 of which survived him.

== See also ==
- Letters from Victorian Pioneers
