= Aboriginal Protection Act 1869 =

Australian colony law

Parliament of Victoria
- Long title: An Act to provide for the Protection and Management of the Aboriginal Natives of Victoria.
- Citation: 33 Vict. No. 349
- Royal assent: 11 November 1869

Repealed by
- Aborigines Act 1890
- Status: Repealed

The Aboriginal Protection Act 1869 was an act of the colony of Victoria, Australia that established the Victorian Central Board for the Protection of Aborigines, to replace the Central Board Appointed to Watch Over the Interests of the Aborigines. The Act made Victoria the first colony to enact comprehensive regulations on the lives of Aboriginal Australians. The Act and subsequent regulations gave the Board extensive powers over the lives of Aboriginal Victorians, including regulation of residence, employment, marriage, social life, custody of children and other aspects of daily life.

== History ==
In 1860 the Victorian government established a Central Board for the Aborigines and six Aboriginal reserves under the control of managers appointed by the board. By 1869 a quarter of Aboriginal Victorians lived on reserves. Victoria enacted the Aboriginal Protection Act 1869 providing addition powers to compel Aboriginal Victorians to live on reserves. In 1871 the board developed further controls over where Aboriginal people could live and work, what they could do, who they could meet or marry. However, by 1877 fewer than half of Aboriginal Victorians lived on reserves.

In 1886, Victoria's parliament passed the Aborigines Protection Act 1886, giving the board power to expel Aboriginal Victorians of mixed heritage ("half-castes") aged from eight to 34 from reserves. According to Broome: "In one move, the Board's costs would be reduced and the Aboriginal race would vanish as the 'full bloods' aged and died, and the 'half castes' were blended to whiteness."

The policy was implemented on the eve of the 1890s depression leading to hardship for many of those expelled from reserves. The policy was reversed by Victoria's Aborigines Act 1910, although extensive controls over the lives of Aboriginal Victorians continued.

== See also ==
- Aboriginal Protection Board
- Half-Caste Act
- Indian Act - (Canada)
