= List of State Register of Heritage Places in the City of Greater Geraldton =

The State Register of Heritage Places is maintained by the Heritage Council of Western Australia. As of 2026, 744 places are heritage-listed in the City of Greater Geraldton, of which 86 are on the State Register of Heritage Places.

== List ==
The Western Australian State Register of Heritage Places, as of 2026, lists the following 86 state registered places within the City of Greater Geraldton:

Place name	Place #	Location	Suburb or town	Co-ordinates	Built	State registered	Notes	Photo
Masonic Lodge, Geraldton	1046	126 Augustus Street	Geraldton	28°46′52″S 114°36′24″E	1892	24 September 2004	A relatively rare example of a masonic lodge in the Federation Free Classical architectural style	
Bill Sewell Community Recreation Complex	1048	Corner Chapman Road & Bayly Street	Geraldton	28°46′07″S 114°36′55″E	1887	10 October 1995	Also referred to as Victoria Districts Hospital and Geraldton Prison; A group of intact late Victorian buildings	
Birdwood House, Geraldton	1049	44 & 46 Chapman Road	Geraldton	28°46′18″S 114°36′47″E	1935	18 November 2016	Also referred to as RSL Hall and Returned Services League Hall; Built in the Inter-War Free Classical style with Inter-War Georgian Revival details; Named in honour of William Birdwood, a British General who commanded Australian and New Zealand troops in World War I	
The Hermitage	1051	Onslow Street & Cathedral Avenue	Geraldton	28°47′08″S 114°36′53″E	1936	9 September 2011	Designed by Priest and Architect John Hawes; A retreat house designed in the Inter-War Old English Style to accommodate only one person	
Geraldton railway station (former)	1052	75 & 79 Chapman Road	Geraldton	28°46′18″S 114°36′47″E	1915	15 May 1998	Listing includes 0 mile peg; Built in the Federation Free style, Geraldton station once ranked third in railway activity in Western Australia, after Perth and Midland	
Nazareth House	1055	Crowtherton Street	Bluff Point	28°43′45″S 114°37′22″E	1941	20 February 2004	Also referred to as Nursing Home; Constructed in the Inter-War Mediterranean style as a welfare facility for the Catholic Church; Based on a design by Priest and Architect John Hawes	
Geraldton Town Hall (former)	1058	22-24 Chapman Road	Geraldton	28°46′24″S 114°36′41″E	1907	12 December 1997	Also referred to as Geraldton Art Gallery; Built in the Federation Academic Classical style; One of the few public buildings in Geraldton remaining from the gold boom era	
Radio Theatre Building	1060	205-209 Marine Terrace	Geraldton	28°46′31″S 114°36′25″E	1937	16 December 2003	Rare example of a picture theatre built in the Inter-War Art Deco style outside of Perth	
Community Education Centre, Geraldton	1061	24 Gregory Street	Geraldton	28°46′38″S 114°36′20″E	1874	15 October 2004	Also referred to as Forrest Lodge and Forrest House; A rare example of a Victorian-Georgian style building in Geraldton	
Geraldton Police Barracks (former)	1062	205-215 Lester Avenue	Geraldton	28°46′36″S 114°36′21″E	1912	1 October 2002	Built in the Federation Free style; Unique example of police officer barracks in country Western Australia, a rare practice in the state	
St John's Uniting Church (former)	1063	225-227 Lester Avenue	Geraldton	28°46′36″S 114°36′30″E	1893	21 January 1997	Also referred to as St John's Presbyterian Church until 1977; Built in the Victorian Freestyle Gothic style; The oldest surviving church in Geraldton	
St Francis Xavier Cathedral	1064	Corner Cathedral Avenue & Maitland Street	Geraldton	28°46′39″S 114°36′43″E	1938	10 October 1995	The largest and most imposing work of Priest and Architect John Hawes	
Geraldton Drill Hall	1065	Corner Lester & Cathedral Avenue	Geraldton	28°46′32″S 114°36′36″E	1935	20 February 2004	Also referred to as Army Reserves Hall; Constructed as the base for the Geraldton Rifles Volunteer Corps, which was formed in 1876	
Original Railway Station (1878–93), Geraldton	1068	246 Marine Terrace	Geraldton	28°46′32″S 114°36′20″E	1878	7 April 1998	Also referred to as Geraldton Regional Museum and Mechanics' Institute; The only surviving early station on the oldest Government railway line in Western Australia	
Geraldton Club	1069	160-66 Marine Terrace	Geraldton	28°46′28″S 114°36′29″E	1912	30 June 2009	Also referred to as Gentleman's Club; Built in the Federation Free style	
Mission to Seamen Building	1071	272 Marine Terrace	Geraldton	28°46′35″S 114°36′16″E	1864	27 February 2004	Also referred to as Church, Government School and Old Lockup; One of the earliest school buildings still extant in the Mid-West region; Built in the Victorian Georgian style	
Geraldton Court House	1072	Corner Marine Terrace & Forrest Street	Geraldton	28°46′16″S 114°36′43″E	1898	7 January 2000	Includes Bennetts Wall, Geraldton Public Buildings; Built in the Federation Free Classical style	
Chapel of San Spirito	1073	130 Utakarra Road	Utakarra	28°46′41″S 114°38′35″E	1936	10 October 1995	Spirito', Utakarra Cemetery Chapel of 'St. (Sancte); Designed by Priest and Architect John Hawes; Contains the tomb of Archdeacon Adolphe Joseph Lecaille	
Geraldton Lighthouse Tower & Quarters	1074	353-355 Chapman Road	Bluff Point	28°44′37″S 114°37′17″E	1876	9 July 1993	Also referred to as Museum and Geraldton Historical Society Headquarters; Unusually, the tower for the light is attached to living quarters rather than the two being separate buildings	
Greenough Pioneer Cemetery	1133	Brand Highway	Greenough	28°56′02″S 114°44′20″E	1853	24 March 2000	Also referred to as Greenough Cemetery; One of the largest and most intact pioneer cemeteries in the Mid-West region of Western Australia	
Corringle	1134	Brand Highway	Greenough	28°54′08″S 114°41′56″E	1898	19 January 2007	Also referred to as Peak Hill, Woodburn House and Adlam Cottage; A two-storey limestone homestead built in the Federation Filigree style	
Dominican Convent (former)	1142	62 Gregory Road	Greenough	28°56′37″S 114°44′39″E	1898	9 July 1993	Also referred to as Greenough Convent and Presentation Convent; Convent and school operated by the Dominican sisters	
Greenough Hotel (former)	1143	9 Gregory Road	Greenough	28°56′11″S 114°44′27″E	1868	9 July 1993	Also referred to as Criddle's Hotel and Mill Farm; Consists of two abutting stone buildings	
St James' Anglican Church, South Greenough	1145	33583 Brand Highway	Greenough	29°00′16″S 114°47′48″E	1872	29 October 2010	A simple rural church built in the Victorian Romanesque style	
Clinch's Mill	1146	Gregory Road	Greenough	28°56′18″S 114°44′28″E	1857	9 July 1993	Also referred to as Padbury's Mill; A three storey limestone building and the first flour mill in the district	
Hampton Arms	1151	Company Road	Greenough	28°57′50″S 114°45′05″E	1863	22 January 2002	Also referred to as Hampton Hotel (former); Built in the Victorian Regency style	
Old Store	1152	91 Gregory Road	Greenough	28°56′39″S 114°44′43″E	1886	9 July 1993	Also referred to as Wainwright's Store and Greenough Store; Typical country general store of its time	
Gray's Store	1153	Corner Company & McCartney Roads	Greenough	28°57′09″S 114°44′16″E	1861	9 July 1993	A simple rectangular limestone building	
Cliff Grange Farmhouse	1154	Gregory Road	Greenough	28°56′20″S 114°44′32″E	1870	9 July 1993	Also referred to as Cliffe Grange	
Central Greenough School Building	1156	Gregory Road	Greenough	28°56′37″S 114°44′40″E	1865	9 July 1993	Also referred to as Central Greenough State School and Miss Duncan's School Room (former); A simple single room stone building	
Greenough Court House, Police Station and Gaol	1157	Gregory Road	Greenough	28°56′35″S 114°44′39″E	1866	9 July 1993	Also referred to as Government Buildings; A single storey limestone building including the lock up, with a high stone wall and external stables surrounding a court yard	
Priest's House (former)	1158	Gregory Road	Greenough	28°56′36″S 114°44′37″E	1900	9 July 1993	Also referred to as Presbytery; A simple single storey rectangular stone building	
Greenough Road Board Office (former)	1159	Gregory Road	Greenough	28°56′33″S 114°44′36″E	1906	14 December 2001	A single room rectangular stone building of Victorian Georgian style	
St Catherine's Anglican Church Hall	1160	39 Gregory Road	Greenough	28°56′32″S 114°44′36″E	1898	9 July 1993	A simple rectangular stone building with small porch	
St Catherine's Anglican Church	1161	Gregory Road	Greenough	28°56′32″S 114°44′36″E	1913	14 December 2001	A stone church in the Federation Gothic style	
St Peter's Catholic Church	1162	Gregory Road	Greenough	28°56′38″S 114°44′39″E	1908	2 September 1997	Built in the Australian ecclesiastical vernacular style, with Gothic stylistic references	
St Joseph's School (former)	1164	Gregory Road	Greenough	28°56′37″S 114°44′38″E	1891	9 July 1993	Also referred to as Ned Goodwin's Cottage (former) and St Peter's School (former); A stone building with four rooms and a verandah	
Maley's Mill	1165	Phillips Road	Greenough	28°54′56″S 114°42′35″E	1861	24 November 2000	Also referred to as Victoria Flour Mill (former); A rare example of a flour mill with a general store	
Maley's Bridge	1166	McCartney Road	Greenough	28°56′55″S 114°44′31″E	1864	16 July 1993	Also referred to as MRWA 4554 and Convict Bridge; Convict-built bridge with limesone abutments and piers with a timber superstructure	
Wesley Methodist Chapel (former)	1167	524 Company Road	Greenough	28°57′08″S 114°44′16″E	1867	15 October 1999	While of a common design the church is an early example and of high quality workmanship	
Holy Trinity Anglican Church	1168	Lot 13 Walkaway-Nangetty Road	Walkaway	28°56′26″S 114°48′44″E	1903	23 November 2004	A single-room church with stylistic characteristics of the Federation Carpenter Gothic style	
Walkaway Railway Station Museum	1170	34Padbury Road	Walkaway	28°56′21″S 114°48′06″E	1888	15 October 1999	Also referred to as Walkaway Railway Station & Goods Shed and Walkaway Railway Station; Consists of a two-storey Federation Arts and Crafts style station, a goods shed and associated structures	
Geraldton to Walkaway Railway Precinct	1259	Railway Line Route between Bluff Point and Narngulu	Geraldton	N/A	1886	9 December 2011	The first section of the line to link Perth with Geraldton	
Church of Our Lady of Mount Carmel & Holy Apostles St Peter & St Paul & Priest House	1656	Corner Bowes & Doney Streets	Mullewa	28°32′20″S 115°31′04″E	1915	10 October 1995	Also referred to as Priesthouse & Presentation Convent (former); Designed by Priest and Architect John Hawes who also served as a priest at the church	
Priest House	1657	Bowes Street	Mullewa	28°32′20″S 115°31′04″E	1927		Also referred to as Hawe's Museum; Part of Church of Our Lady of Mount Carmel & Holy Apostles St Peter & St Paul & Priesthouse precinct (1656)	
Masonic Lodge (former), Mullewa	1662	43 Jose Street	Mullewa	28°32′18″S 115°30′42″E	1926	28 September 2012	A simple stone building in the Victorian Georgian style	
Pindar Garage Buildings	1668	Sharpe Street	Pindar	28°28′39″S 115°47′19″E	1926	21 April 2006	Also referred to as Stoner & Wright; A rare combination of distinctive architecture and accumulated objects	
Pindar Hotel (former)	1669	17 Sharpe Street	Pindar	28°28′37″S 115°47′26″E	1905	23 April 1999	Built in the Federation Filigree style	
Christian Brothers' Agricultural School Group	1672	Kelly Road	Tardun	28°42′11″S 115°48′58″E	1936	5 January 2001	Designed by Priest and Architect John Hawes; Operated as a farm school by the Christian Brothers	
Pallottine Monastery	1673	739 Pallotine Road	Tardun	28°47′14″S 115°50′37″E	1938	17 March 2006	Also referred to as St Joseph's Farm, Beagle Bay Farm and Wandalgu Hostel; Designed in the Inter-War Californian Bungalow style by Priest and Architect John Hawes; Operated by German Pallottine missionaries	
Chapman River Road Bridge	3410	Chapman Road	Sunset Beach	28°43′48″S 114°37′38″E	1863	7 January 2022	Also referred to as Bridge No 797	
Newmarracarra	3443	1853 Geraldton-Mount Magnet Road	Bringo	28°43′10″S 114°49′32″E	1910	7 October 1997	Built in the Federation Queen Anne style; An example of an unmodified large rural homestead from 1910	
Rosella House	3458	11 Bayly Street	Geraldton	28°46′06″S 114°37′00″E	1912	9 May 1997	Also referred to as Rosella Hospital and Rehabilitation Centre; Built in a derivative of the Arts and Crafts style; The building displays a construction technique rarely used for whole buildings in Western Australia	
Geraldton Residency	3715	321 Marine Terrace	Geraldton	28°46′41″S 114°36′09″E	1861	7 April 1998	Also referred to as Geraldton Community Centre and Geraldton & Districts Maternity Hospital; A single-storey limestone house in the Old Colonial Georgian style	
Glengarry Station Complex	3726	Glengarry Road	Moonyoonooka	28°49′43″S 114°49′29″E	1850	4 May 2001	Also referred to as Glengarry Stables; Stable buildings in the Victorian Georgian style; The only known historic circular internal horse-breaking room in Western Australia and, possibly, Australia	
Old Greenough Post Office (site of)	3728	Gregory Road	Greenough	28°56′37″S 114°44′40″E	1930		Also referred to as Post Office site; Part of the Central Greenough School Building Precinct (1156); Demolished by the National Trust (WA) during the restoration of the Central Greenough Historic Settlement in the late 1970s	
Point Moore Lighthouse	3927	45 Marine Terrace	West End	28°46′58″S 114°34′46″E	1878	4 May 2001	A prefabricated cast iron tower and the tallest of its kind in Western Australia	
Geraldton Customs House Complex	3940	7 & 9 Francis Street	Geraldton	28°46′38″S 114°36′15″E	1935	23 April 1999	Also referred to as HM Customs House/Office, Bond Store, Kings Warehouse and Sub-Collectors Residence; A group of three related principal buildings	
Sandsprings Homestead Group	3944	325 Sandsprings Road	Sandsprings	28°48′02″S 114°58′14″E	1868	29 June 2010	The buildings and cemetery are associated with the beginnings of pastoral settlement in the Midwest region of Western Australia	
St James Chapel, Kojarena	3958	Kojarena South Road	Geraldton	28°44′26″S 114°52′17″E	1935	31 July 2007	Built in the Inter-War Gothic style; Designed by Priest and Architect John Hawes	
Pioneer Museum, Greenough	4285	1 Phillips Road	Greenough	28°54′55″S 114°42′37″E	1862	22 November 2002	Also referred to as Home Cottage (former) and Wonga Park Museum; Consists of a two storey brick cottage with a cellar, a wash house and surrounding gardens, arranged around a central courtyard	
Tibradden Homestead Group	4630	1318 Sandsprings Road	Tibradden	28°45′06″S 114°54′16″E	1850	24 January 2014	One of the earliest homesteads established in the Victoria district	
Butterabby Graves	5109	Devil's Creek Road/Butterabby Road	Devil's Creek	28°41′06″S 115°29′53″E	1864	31 March 2006	Site of the execution and burial of Aboriginal men Wangayakoo, Yourmacarra, Garder, Charlacarra and Williacarra by the Colonial Government for resistance to pastoralist expansion	
Presentation Convent (former)	5112	Doney Street	Mullewa	28°32′20″S 115°31′04″E	1915		Also referred to as Building and Our Lady of Mt Carmel School Administration; Part of Church of Our Lady of Mount Carmel & Holy Apostles St Peter & St Paul & Priest House Precinct (1656)	
De Grey - Mullewa Stock Route No. 9701	5113	Through Woodenooka & Tallering Peak from Mullewa			1870	7 December 2022	Also referred to as De Gray Mullewa Stock Route; A 1,500 kilometre stock route from Mullewa to just east of the De Grey River, near Port Hedland	
Mullewa Railway Station Group	6105	40 Maitland Road	Mullewa	28°32′34″S 115°30′41″E	1894	31 March 2006	The group, once substantial railway station complex, has lost a number of buildings and structures and the remaining ones have been altered or allowed to deteriorate	
Narra Tarra Homestead, Outbuildings & Cemetery	6353	982 Narra Tarra-Moonyoonooka Road	Narra Tarra	28°41′22″S 114°44′07″E	1853	9 September 2003	A good example of a farming complex established on a pastoral landholding in the mid-1800s; Also listed as Narra Tarra Homestead & Outbuildings (24941) under the Shire of Chapman Valley	
Railway Gatekeeper's Cottage (former)	11054	Short Road	Walkaway	28°55′21″S 114°47′01″E	1886		Also referred to as Aujoro, Railway House (former) and Desmond's Cottage (former); Part of Geraldton to Walkaway Railway Precinct (1259)	
Geraldton District Honour Roll, Birdwood House	12422	Corner Chapman Road & Forrest Street	Geraldton	28°46′18″S 114°36′47″E	1930		Part of Birdwood House Precinct (1049)	
Moonyoonooka State School Roll of Honour, Birdwood House	12516	Corner Chapman Road & Forrest Street	Geraldton	28°46′18″S 114°36′47″E	1930		Part of Birdwood House Precinct (1049)	
Trefusis, Chapman & Jose Factory (former)	13200	132 Augustus Street	Geraldton	28°46′46″S 114°36′22″E	1886	15 October 2004	Also referred to as Training Centre and Geraldton Skill Share; A rare example of a stone factory building in Western Australia	
Cathedral of the Holy Cross, Geraldton	13227	Cathedral Avenue	Geraldton	28°46′44″S 114°36′52″E	1964	25 June 2004	A rare example of Post-War Ecclesiastical style architecture in Western Australia	
Old Geraldton Gaol & Warder's Cottages	13240	84 Chapman Road	Geraldton	28°46′07″S 114°36′55″E	1859		Also referred to as Gaol/House; Part of Bill Sewell Community Recreation Complex Precinct (1048)	
Railway Cottage (former), Bluff Point & Two Mile Well	13253	300 & 308 Chapman Road	Beresford	28°44′53″S 114°37′12″E	1886	12 November 2004	Also referred to as Gatekeepers Cottage; Part of Geraldton to Walkaway Railway Precinct (1259); A single storey stone cottage	
Railway House (former), Utakarra	13373	Lot 2710 Eastward Road	Utakarra	28°46′38″S 114°38′52″E	1893		Part of Geraldton to Walkaway Railway Precinct (1259)	
Geraldton Primary School	13390	75 Fitzgerald Street	Geraldton	28°46′43″S 114°36′28″E	1878	18 May 2004	Also referred to as Mixed School, Geraldton District High School and State School; A group of masonry and tiled buildings constructed in the Victorian Georgian style	
Belay Farm Group, Walkaway	13900	Evans Road	Walkaway	28°56′02″S 114°46′35″E	1858	29 June 2010	Also referred to as Belay Homestead; A rare example, particularly in the Midwest, of an early farm complex that remains extant and usable	
Walkaway CWA Rooms	13926	5 Evans Road	Walkaway	28°56′25″S 114°48′03″E	1959	14 February 2003	Typical purpose built facility for the Country Women's Association	
Windarra, Moonyoonooka	13929	34 Glengarry Road	Moonyoonooka	28°46′54″S 114°45′22″E	1863	17 January 2012	Also referred to as Windarra and Moonyoonooka (former); A rare example of a farm building converted to a two storey residence	
Koogereena Homestead	13930	Kojarena Road South	Kojarena	28°44′36″S 114°51′53″E	1911	20 January 2006	A single-storey brick and stone residence in the Federation Queen Anne style	
Yanget Station Group, Kojarena	13931	330 Yanget Road	Kojarena	28°41′39″S 114°52′00″E	1910	3 February 2020	Also referred to as Yanget and Yanget Homestead & Airstrip; Consists of a homestead in the Federation Bungalow style and the RAAF Kojarena World War II satellite aerodrome	
Railway Goods Shed	25458	Maley Street	Mullewa	28°32′34″S 115°30′41″E			Part of Mullewa Railway Station Group Precinct (6105)	
Railway Water Tank & Column	25459	19 Darlot Road	Mullewa	28°32′34″S 115°30′41″E			Part of Mullewa Railway Station Group Precinct (6105)	
St Mary's Chapel - Christian Brother's Agricultural School	25464	970 Kelly Road	Tardun	28°42′11″S 115°48′58″E			Part of Christian Brothers' Agricultural School Group Precinct (1672)	
St Mary's Convent - Christian Brothers' Agricultural School	25465	970 Kelly Road	Tardun	28°42′11″S 115°48′58″E			Part of Christian Brothers' Agricultural School Group Precinct (1672)	
Pindar Garage Residence	25466	3 Sharpe Street	Pindar	28°28′39″S 115°47′19″E			Pindar Garage Buildings Precinct (1668)	
