= Geraldton to Mullewa railway line =

Railway line in Western Australia

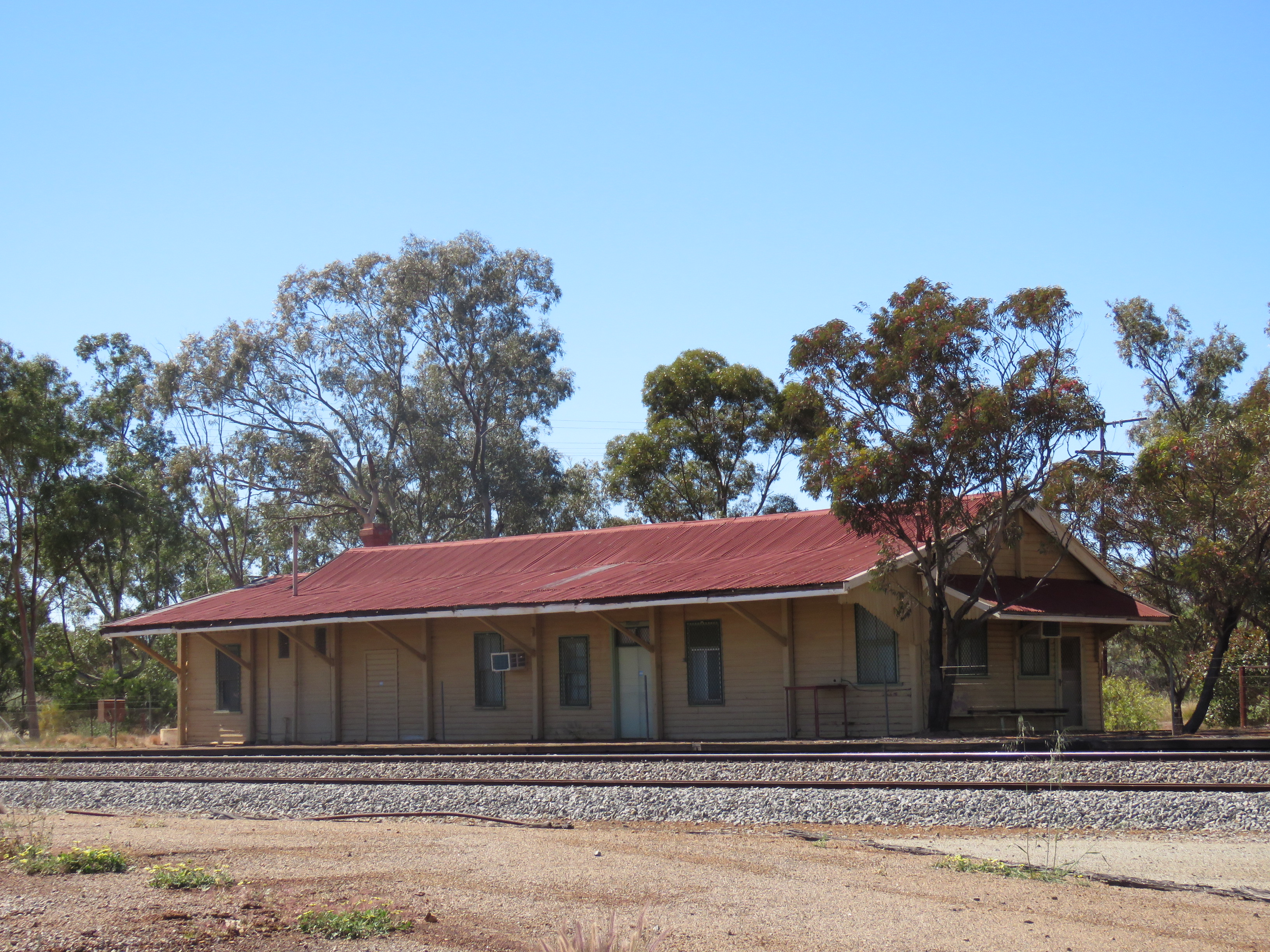
- The state heritage listed Mullewa railway station

Overview
- Owner: Public Transport Authority
- Locale: Mid West, Western Australia
- Termini: Geraldton; Mullewa

Service
- Operator(s): Arc Infrastructure

History
- Commenced: 1893
- Opened: 21 November 1894

Technical
- Line length: 107 km (66 mi)
- Track gauge: 1,067 mm (3 ft 6 in)
- Highest elevation: 293.15 m (961.8 ft)
- Geraldton to Mullewa railway line Main locations

The Geraldton to Mullewa railway line is a 107-kilometre (66 mi) long railway line in the Mid West region of Western Australia, connecting Geraldton and Mullewa.

At Mullewa, it connects to the Avon Yard to Mullewa railway line, which runs to the Avon Yard in Northam. Historically, it also connected to the former Mullewa to Meekatharra railway line but only the 30-kilometre (19 mi) section from Mullewa to Pindar is still listed on official railway maps. At Narngulu, 13 kilometres (8.1 mi) east of Geraldton, it connects to the Millendon Junction to Narngulu railway line.

== History ==
The Northampton railway line, officially opened in July 1879, was the first government railway line to be built in Western Australia and linked Geraldton to Northampton.

The Geraldton–Mullewa Railway Act 1892, an act by the Parliament of Western Australia granted assent on 18 March 1892, authorised the construction of the railway line from Geraldton to Mullewa. The new railway line would commence from Narngulu on the Geraldton to Greenough railway line, south of Geraldton, which had been completed in 1887.

The contract to construct the line from Narngulu to Mullewa was awarded to Neil McNeil & Co on 29 March 1893 and the new railway line was officially opened on 21 November 1894.

Mullewa was the end of the railway line until the completion of the railway line heading east to Cue in 1898 and on to Meekatharra, completed in 1910. A further railway line, continuing to Wiluna, opened in 1932.

The connection south, to Northam, was completed in 1915, when the final section of the railway line from Wongan Hills to Mullewa was opened.

Arc Infrastructure deems the railway line to be part of its Grain Freight Rail Network, which, in 2017, accounted for 50 percent of its network but only 10 percent of its freight. The line from Geraldton via Mullewa to Perenjori section, titled the Geraldton Backline, apart from grain, also carried a large amount of iron ore.

As of 2024, the railway line from Geraldton to Mullewa is operated by Arc Infrastructure and in use. Continuing from there, heading south, the railway line is shown as operational until Perenjori. The 104-kilometre (65 mi) section from Perenjori to Dalwallinu is shown as not in use while from Dalwallinu to the Avon Yard it is active again.

== Elevation ==
The railway line starts at an elevation of 2.41 metres (7.9 ft) at Geraldton, its lowest point, and finishes at Mullewa at an elevation of 279.78 metres (917.9 ft). It reaches its highest point of 293.15 metres (961.8 ft) at 105.8 kilometres (65.7 mi), just before its terminus at Mullewa.

== Heritage ==
A number of buildings associated with the railway line are listed on the Western Australian State Register of Heritage Places, including:

- the original Geraldton railway station, in use from 1878 to 1893 and predating the Mullewa line
- the third Geraldton railway station, in use from 1915 to 1975
- the Mullewa railway station with its goods shed and water tank

Additionally, the Meru railway siding and the railway house at Utakarra and the Eradu railway bridge over the Greenough River are listed on the heritage register of the City of Greater Geraldton.
