= Shire of Mullewa =

Former local government area in Western Australia

Coordinates: 28°32′13″S 115°30′43″E

- Local government area
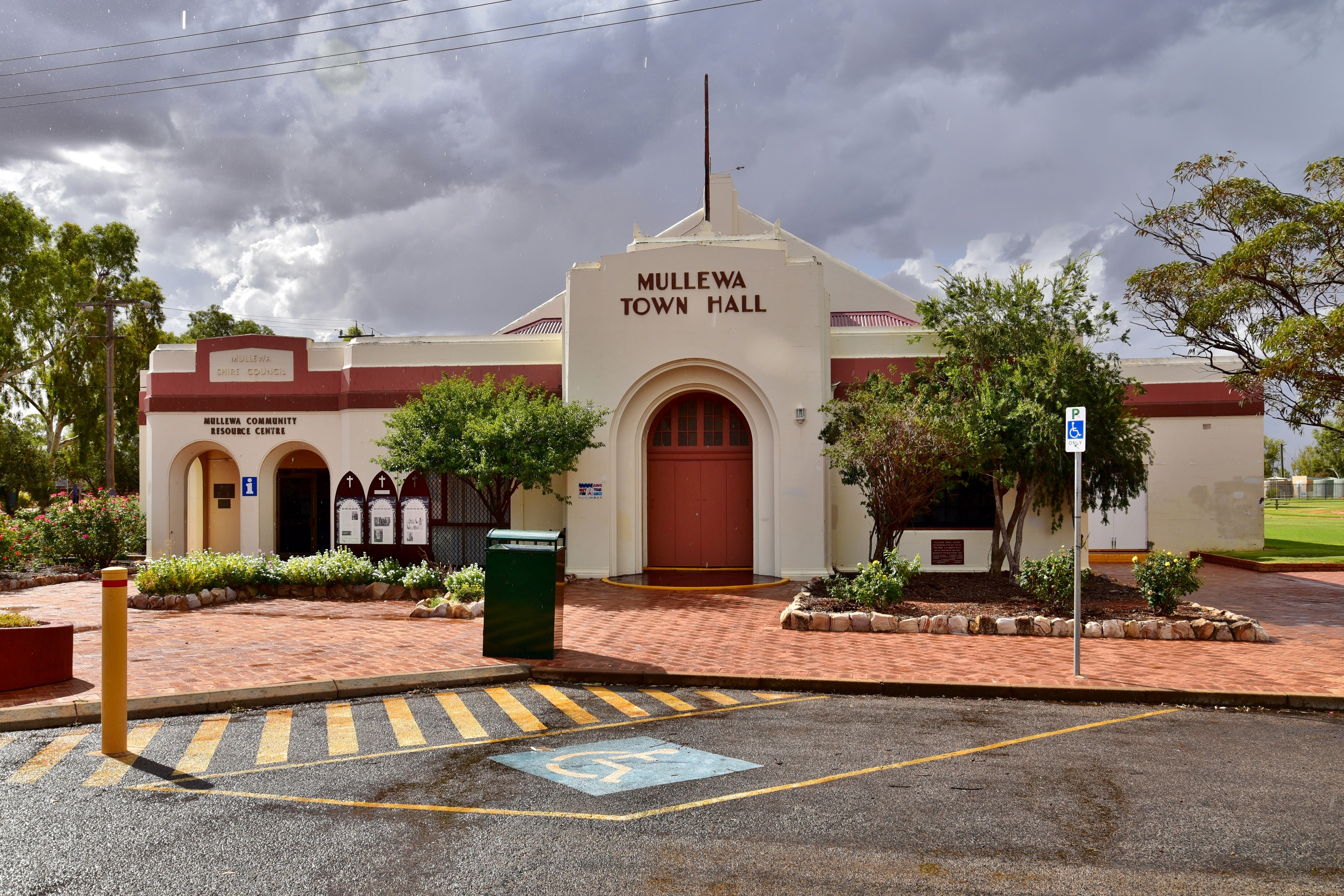
- Mullewa Town Hall, 2018

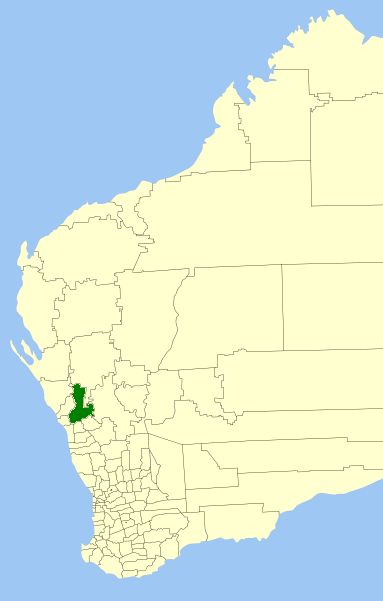
- Location in Western Australia
- Country: Australia
- State: Western Australia
- Region: Mid West
- Established: 1911
- Abolished: 2011
- Council seat: Mullewa

Area
  - Total: 10,827.2 km^{2} (4,180.4 sq mi)

Population
  - Total(s): 729 (2011)
  - Density: 0.06733/km^{2} (0.17439/sq mi)
LGAs around Shire of Mullewa
Northampton	Murchison	Murchison
Chapman Valley	Shire of Mullewa	Yalgoo
Geraldton-Greenough	Mingenew	Morawa

The Shire of Mullewa was a local government area in the Mid West region of Western Australia, about 100 kilometres (62 mi) east of the city of Geraldton and about 450 kilometres (280 mi) north of the state capital, Perth. The Shire covered an area of 10,827 square kilometres (4,180 sq mi), and its seat of government was the town of Mullewa. It amalgamated with the City of Geraldton-Greenough on 1 July 2011 to become part of the City of Greater Geraldton.

== History ==
The Mullewa Road District was constituted on 11 August 1911, and on 1 July 1961, it became a shire under the Local Government Act 1960.

== Amalgamation ==
Throughout 2010 and 2011, negotiations were held between the City of Geraldton-Greenough and the Shire of Mullewa as to whether the two entities should merge. After a long period of negotiations, the entities decided to merge. The merger was approved by the Local Government Advisory Board in December 2010. A poll was requested by both communities and was held on 16 April 2011. 83.24% of voters voted against the merger in Mullewa, with 72.39% of voters against the merger in Geraldton-Greenough. However, both polls failed to reach the minimum 50% turnout required for a valid poll. The two entities merged on 1 July 2011 to become the City of Greater Geraldton.

== Wards ==
The Shire was divided into four wards:

- Central Ward (three councillors)
- East Ward (two councillors)
- South Ward (two councillors)
- West Ward (one councillor)

== Towns and localities ==
- Mullewa
- Pindar
- Tardun
- Tenindewa
- Wandanooka
- Wilroy
- Wongoondy
- Woolgorong

== Population ==
Year	Population
1921	816
1933	1,622
1947	1,325
1954	1,657
1961	1,627
1966	1,825
1971	1,849
1976	1,859
1981	1,648
1986	1,455
1991	1,390
1996	1,176
2001	1,118
2006	982
2011	729
