= Paroo =

Paroo may refer to:

- Shire of Paroo, a local government area in South West Queensland
- Paroo, Western Australia, a locality in the Mid West region of Western Australia
- Paroo River, a seasonal stream in Australia
- Paroo Station, an Australian pastoral lease that operates as a cattle station
- Paroo (Vidhan Sabha constituency), an assembly constituency in Muzaffarpur district in the Indian state of Bihar.
- Paroo family, fictional characters in the musical and movie The Music Man
