= The Mullewa =

Former railway service in Western Australia

Overview
- Service type: Overnight passenger train
- Status: Ceased
- First service: 30 October 1961
- Last service: 17 March 1974
- Former operator: Western Australian Government Railways

Route
- Termini: Perth; Mullewa
- Average journey time: 15 hours
- Service frequency: 3 x weekly
- Train number: 69/72
- Lines used: Eastern; Northern

The Mullewa was an overnight passenger train operated by the Western Australian Government Railways between Perth and Mullewa in the Mid West Region via the Eastern and Northern lines.

== History ==
The Mullewa commenced operating on 30 October 1961 as a three times a week service between Perth and Mullewa.

In the 1940s a two days a week passenger service was available. Previously sleeper carriages had been attached to a freight train. At Mullewa it connected with a road coach service to Geraldton. Once a week, a sleeping carriage continued beyond Mullewa to Meekatharra attached to a freight train. The Mullewa was withdrawn on 17 March 1974.

== Sources ==
- Higham, Geoffrey (2007). Marble Bar to Mandurah: A History of Passenger Rail Services in Western Australia (1st ed.). Bassendean: Rail Heritage WA. ISBN 978-0-9803922-0-3. OCLC 271545712. Wikidata Q140375689.
