= Prostanthera patens =

Scientific classification
- Kingdom: Plantae
- Clade: Tracheophytes
- Clade: Angiosperms
- Clade: Eudicots
- Clade: Asterids
- Order: Lamiales
- Family: Lamiaceae
- Genus: Prostanthera
- Species: P. patens

Binomial name
- Prostanthera patens B.J.Conn
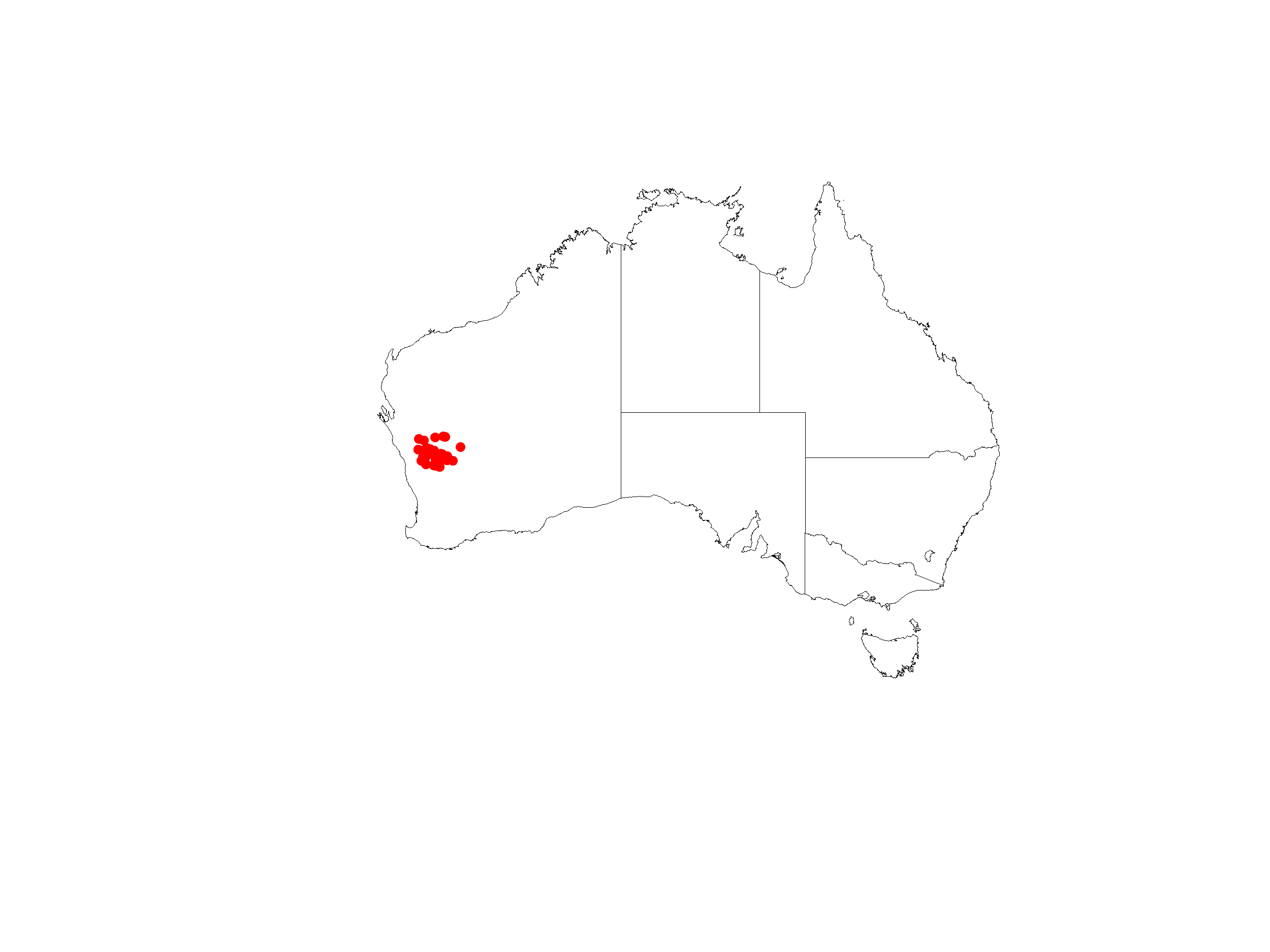
- Occurrence data from AVH

Species of flowering plant

Prostanthera patens is a species of flowering plant in the family Lamiaceae and is endemic to Western Australia. It is a small shrub with stiff, spine-like, hairy branches, egg-shaped to broadly elliptic, hairy leaves and red and orange to pale red flowers.

== Description ==
Prostanthera patens is a shrub that typically grows to a height of 0.6–1 m (2 ft 0 in – 3 ft 3 in) and has stiff, spine-like, hairy branches. The leaves are often clustered towards the ends of the branchlets and are egg-shaped to broadly elliptic, 1.5–2.5 mm (0.059–0.098 in) long, about 1–1.5 mm (0.039–0.059 in) wide on a short petiole. Each flower is on a densely hairy pedicel 1.5–3.2 mm (0.059–0.126 in) long with green to maroon sepals forming a tube 4–4.5 mm (0.16–0.18 in) long with two lobes 2.5–3.5 mm (0.098–0.138 in) long. The petals are red, orange to pale red near the base, 22–27 mm (0.87–1.06 in) long and form a tube 11–17 mm (0.43–0.67 in) long. The lower lip of the petal tube has three lobes, the centre lobe oblong, 4–5.5 mm (0.16–0.22 in) long and the side lobes 3–4 mm (0.12–0.16 in) long. The upper lip is 5–9 mm (0.20–0.35 in) long with a central notch 0.2–0.6 mm (0.0079–0.0236 in) deep. Flowering occurs from August to October.

== Taxonomy ==
Prostanthera patens was first formally described in 1984 by Barry Conn in the Journal of the Adelaide Botanic Garden from specimens collected in 1975 near Pindar.

== Distribution and habitat ==
This mintbush grows in rocky places near granite and ironstone in the Avon Wheatbelt, Murchison and Yalgoo biogeographic regions.

== Conservation status ==
Prostanthera patens is classified as "not threatened" by the Government of Western Australia Department of Parks and Wildlife.
