= List of acts of the Parliament of Western Australia from 1894 =

This is a list of acts of the Parliament of Western Australia for the year 1894.

== 1894 ==
Short title, or popular name	Citation	Royal assent
Long title
	58 Vict. No. 1	1 August 1894
An Act to apply out of the Consolidated Revenue Fund the sum of One Hundred and Fifty Thousand Pounds (Note: £150,000 in 1894 is equivalent to A$27,500,000 in 2022.) to the Service of the Year ending 30th June, 1895.
Defence Forces Act 1894	58 Vict. No. 2	10 October 1894
An Act to amend and consolidate the laws respecting the Defence Forces and Military requirements of the Colony of Western Australia
Employers' Liability Act 1894	58 Vict. No. 3	
Patents, Designs, and Trade Marks Acts Amendment Act 1894	58 Vict. No. 4	10 October 1894
An Act to amend the Law relating to Patents, Designs, and Trade Marks, and to provide for International and Intercolonial Arrangements with regard to the same.
	58 Vict. No. 5	10 October 1894
An Act to confirm certain Expenditure for the Half-year ending 30th June, One thousand eight hundred and ninety-three.
Banker's Books Evidence Act 1894	58 Vict. No. 6	
	58 Vict. No. 7	10 October 1894
An Act to authorise the Closing of a Certain Portion of Stirling Street, in the Town of Fremantle.
	58 Vict. No. 8	1 November 1894
An Act to apply out of the Consolidated Revenue Fund the sum of One Hundred Thousand Pounds (Note: £100,000 in 1894 is equivalent to A$18,300,000 in 2022.) to the Service of the Year ending 30th June, 1895.
Homesteads Act Amendment Act 1894	58 Vict. No. 9	
Colonial Prisoners Removal Act 1894	58 Vict. No. 10	
Marriage Act 1894	58 Vict. No. 11	
Explosive Substances Act 1894	58 Vict. No. 12	
Small Debts Ordinance 1863 Amendment Act 1894	58 Vict. No. 13	
	58 Vict. No. 14	1 November 1894
An Act to authorise the Closing of a certain Street in the Township of Busselton.
Constitution Act 1889 Amendment Act 1894	58 Vict. No. 15	8 November 1894
An Act to further amend "The Constitution Act, 1889." (Note: Constitution Act 1889 (52 Vict. No. 23))
Registration of Births, Deaths, and Marriages Act 1894	58 Vict. No. 16	
Roads Act 1888 Amendment Act 1894	58 Vict. No. 17	
Loan Act 1894	58 Vict. No. 18	
Dentists Act 1894	58 Vict. No. 19	
Hospitals Act 1894	58 Vict. No. 20	
Agricultural Bank Act 1894	58 Vict. No. 21	23 November 1894
An Act to authorise the Establishment of a Bank for the purpose of assisting the Occupation, Cultivation, and Improvement of Agricultural Lands.
Railways Acts Amendment Act 1894	58 Vict. No. 22	
Friendly Societies Act 1894	58 Vict. No. 23	
Mullewa–Cue Railway Act 1894	58 Vict. No. 24	23 November 1894
An Act to authorise the Construction of a Railway from Mullewa to Cue.
Southern Cross-Coolgardie Railway Act 1894	58 Vict. No. 25	23 November 1894
An Act to authorise the Construction of a Railway from Southern Cross to Coolgardie.
Police Act 1892 Amendment Act 1894 (No. 2)	58 Vict. No. 26	
Scab Act Amendment Act 1894	58 Vict. No. 27	
Goldfields Act 1886 Amendment Act 1894	58 Vict. No. 28	
	58 Vict. No. 29	28 November 1894
An Act to apply a sum out of the Consolidated Revenue to the Service of the Year ending the last day of June, One thousand eight hundred and ninty-five, and to appropriate the Supplies granted in this Session of Parliament.
Elementary Education Act 1871 Amendment Act 1894 (repealed)	58 Vict. No. 30	28 November 1894
An Act to further amend the Law relating to Public Elementary Education. (Repealed by Public Education Act 1899 (63 Vict. No. 3))
	58 Vict. No. 31	28 November 1894
An Act to authorise the Closing of Portions of certain Streets and Thoroughfares in the Town of Bunbury.
Insect Pests Act 1894	58 Vict. No. 32	
Lands Resumption Act 1894	58 Vict. No. 33	
Droving Act 1894	58 Vict. No. 34	
Pharmacy and Poisons Act 1894	58 Vict. No. 35	
Medical Act 1894	58 Vict. No. 36	
Constitution Act 1889 Amendment Act 1894 (No. 2)	58 Vict. No. 37 (Note: Assent of this act was reserved for Her Majesty's Pleasure.)	19 November 1894
An Act to further amend "The Constitution Act, 1889."

== Sources ==
- "legislation.wa.gov.au".
