= Sandstone branch railway =

Former railway in Western Australia

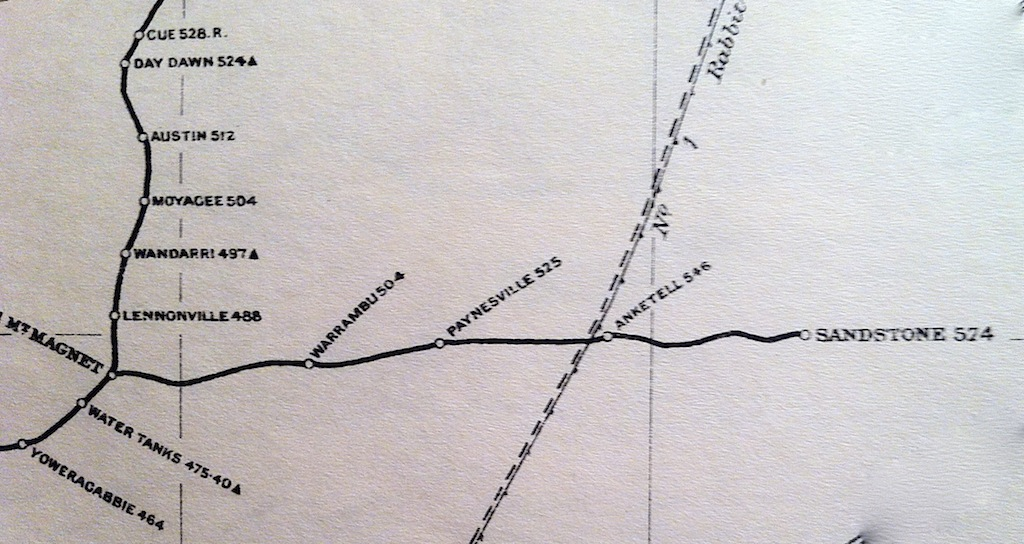
- Map of railway in location to the rabbit-proof fence, and Meekatharra railway line on left

Overview
- Status: Closed
- Locale: Mid West, Western Australia
- Termini: Mount Magnet; Sandstone

History
- Commenced: 1909
- Opened: 1 August 1910
- Closed: 28 May 1949

Technical
- Line length: 150 km (93 mi)
- Track gauge: 1,067 mm (3 ft 6 in)
- Sandstone branch railway Main locations

The Sandstone branch railway (also known as the Black Range railway) was a branch railway line between Mount Magnet and Sandstone in the Mid West region of Western Australia.

== History ==
It was built in 1910, and closed in 1949; it was lifted in 1950.

The Mt. Magnet–Black Range Railway Act 1907, assented to on 20 December 1907, authorised the construction of the railway line, while the Railway (Mt. Magnet–Black Range) Discontinuance Act 1948, assented to on 21 January 1949, permitted its discontinuation. More specifically, the act permitted the removal of the line to be used for the construction or maintenance of other railway lines in the state, or to be sold by the ministry of railways.

== Route ==
It was connected to the Mullewa – Meekatharra railway at Mount Magnet.

== Locations on line ==
- Mount Magnet – 481 miles (774 km) (from Perth)
- Warrambu – 504 miles (811 km)
- Mount Ford – 510 miles (820 km)
- Paynesville 525 miles (845 km)
- Intersection with No 1 Rabbit Proof Fence at 543 miles (874 km)
- Anketell – 547 miles (880 km)
- Jundoo – 550 miles (890 km)
- Sandstone – 575 miles (925 km)

An interactive map of the Sandstone line is available at OpenStreetMap.

== Proposed link to Leonora ==
Prior to and after construction, there were suggestions of connecting to the railway line at Leonora, approximately 100 miles (160 km) south east of Sandstone. Such a connection would have created a loop line linking the Northern Railway with the Eastern Goldfields Railway. The proposal was not successful.

== Reputation of branch line ==
The railway was considered by the railway commissioner of the time in the mid-1930s to be the worst railway in Western Australia.

Post-Second World War austerity issues were given as part of reason for closing in 1948 due to shortage of 45-pound (20 kg) rails for the required repairs to remain open.

== Legacy ==
The Sandstone railway goods shed built in 1910 was considered to be of heritage significance, having survived long after closing of the line. The Sandstone railway station and the station master's house have been demolished but the goods sheet remains on the Shire of Sandstone heritage list, which also includes a railway tank stand and a railway dam at Sandstone.

At Mount Magnet, the railway station and platform, railway dam, railway bridge and the railway workers houses are on the Shire of Mount Magnet heritage list.
