= Prostanthera pedicellata =

Conservation status
- Priority One — Poorly Known Taxa (DEC)

Scientific classification
- Kingdom: Plantae
- Clade: Tracheophytes
- Clade: Angiosperms
- Clade: Eudicots
- Clade: Asterids
- Order: Lamiales
- Family: Lamiaceae
- Genus: Prostanthera
- Species: P. pedicellata

Binomial name
- Prostanthera pedicellata B.J.Conn
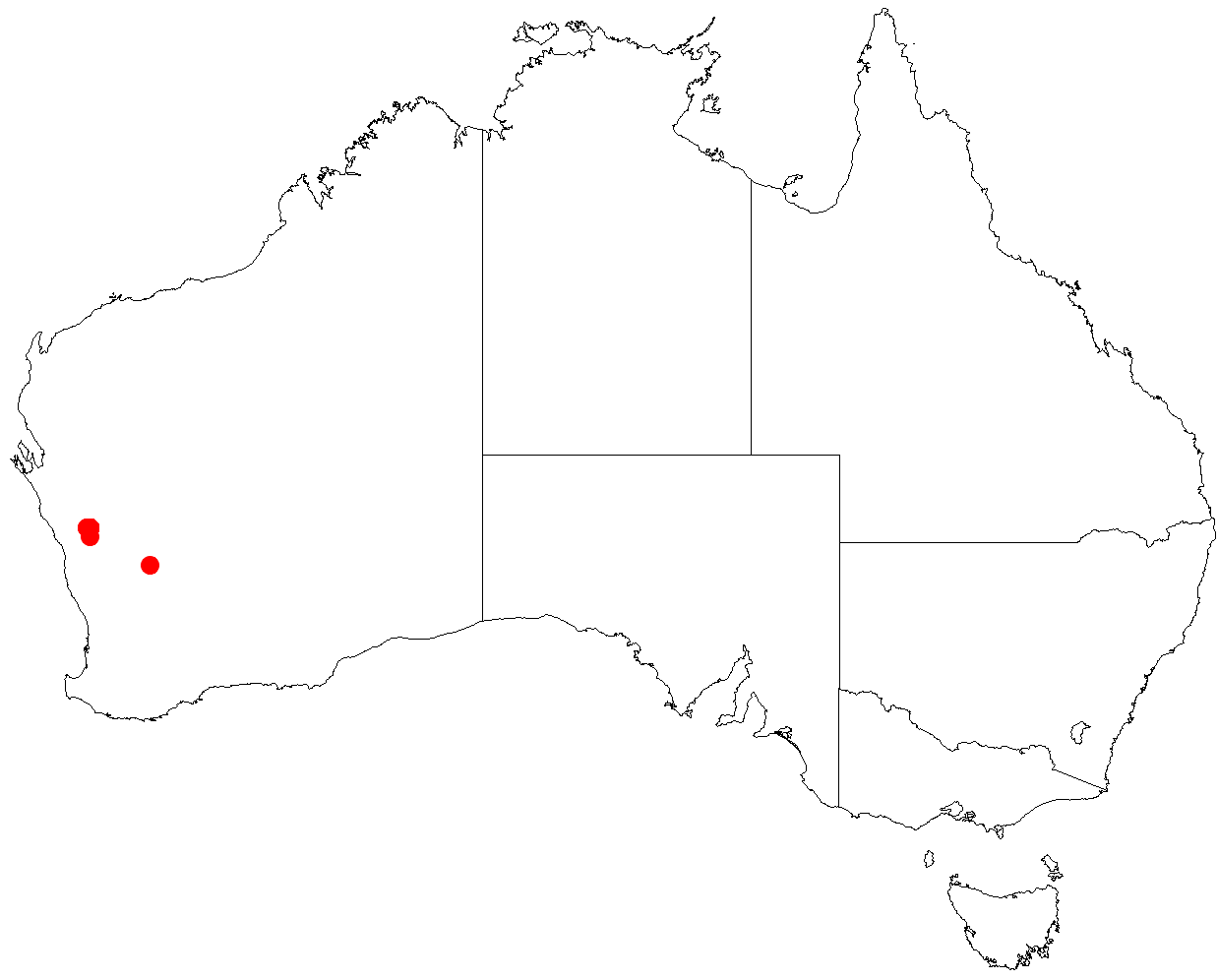
- Occurrence data from AVH

Species of flowering plant

Prostanthera pedicellata is a species of flowering plant in the family Lamiaceae and is endemic to a restricted area of Western Australia. It is a small shrub with densely glandular branches, egg-shaped to oval leaves and red flowers.

== Description ==
Prostanthera pedicellata is a shrub that typically grows to a height of 0.3–1 m (1 ft 0 in – 3 ft 3 in) and has glabrous, densely glandular branches. The leaves are arranged along the branches and are narrow egg-shaped to oblong, 5–8 mm (0.20–0.31 in) long, 1.5–2.5 mm (0.059–0.098 in) wide and more or less sessile. Each flower is on a pedicel 8–15 mm (0.31–0.59 in) long with sepals forming a tube 4–5 mm (0.16–0.20 in) long with two lobes 2.5–3 mm (0.098–0.118 in) long. The petals are red, 20–25 mm (0.79–0.98 in) long and form a tube 11–15 mm (0.43–0.59 in) long. The lower lip of the petal tube has three lobes, the centre lobe egg-shaped, 3–5 mm (0.12–0.20 in) long and the side lobes about 2 mm (0.079 in) long. The upper lip is 5–6 mm (0.20–0.24 in) long, 8–10 mm (0.31–0.39 in) wide with a central notch up to 1 mm (0.039 in) deep. Flowering occurs from August to November.

== Taxonomy ==
Prostanthera pedicellata was first formally described in 1984 by Barry Conn in the Journal of the Adelaide Botanic Garden from specimens collected by Eric Ashby in 1969, near Pindar.

== Distribution and habitat ==
This mintbush grows on ironstone gravel on plains and is only known from near Pindar in the Avon Wheatbelt biogeographic region, where its population size is decreasing due to land clearing.

== Conservation status ==
Prostanthera pedicellata is classified as "Priority One" by the Government of Western Australia Department of Parks and Wildlife, meaning that it is known from only one or a few locations which are potentially at risk.
