= Mullewa–Meekatharra railway =

Former railway in Western Australia

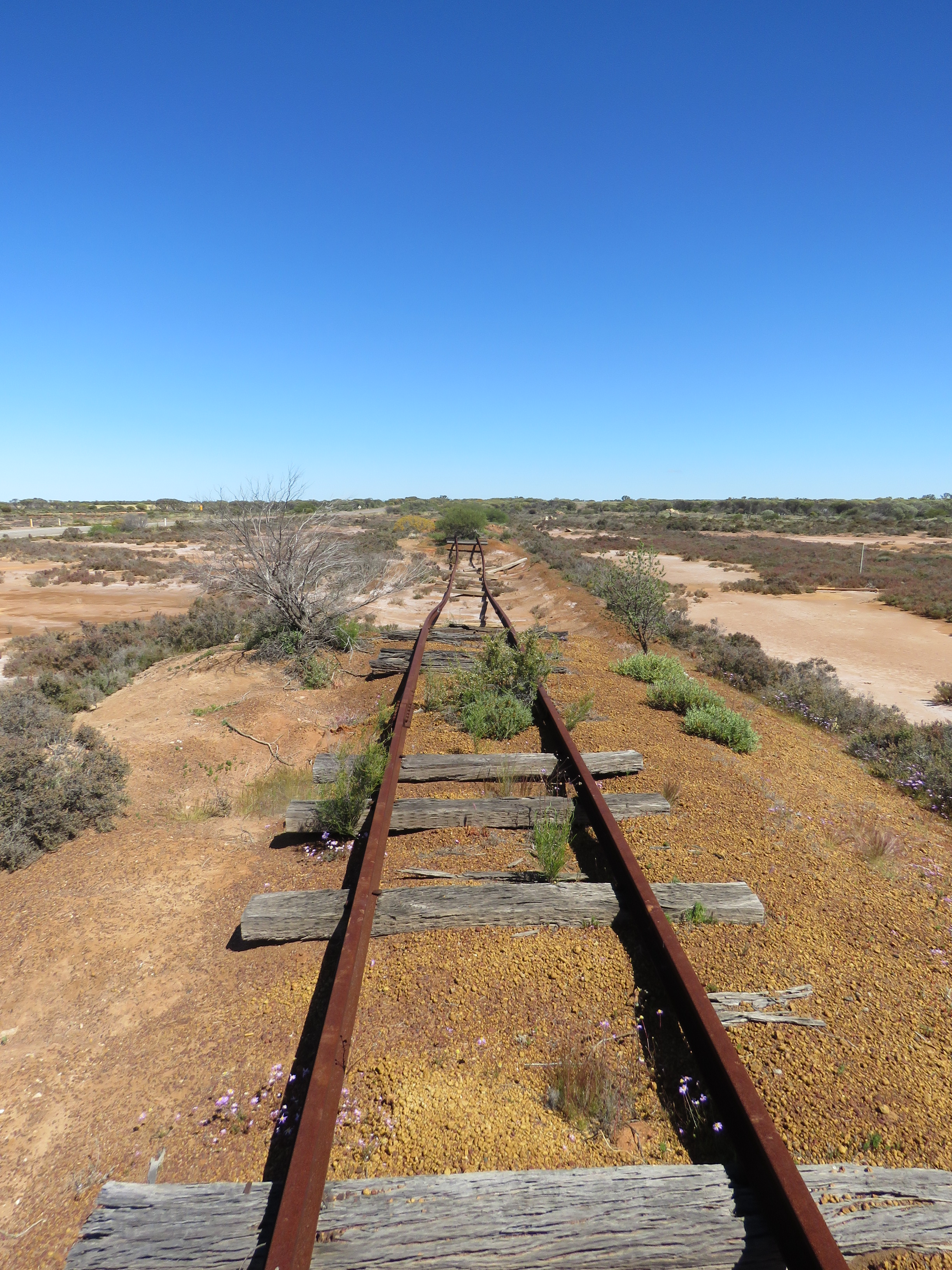
- Abandoned section of the former railway line east of Mullewa

Overview
- Status: Closed
- Locale: Mid West, Western Australia
- Termini: Mullewa; Meekatharra

History
- Commenced: 1895
- Opened: 11 August 1910
- Closed: 29 April 1978

Technical
- Line length: 433 km (269 mi)
- Track gauge: 1,067 mm (3 ft 6 in)
- Mullewa–Meekatharra railway Main locations

The Mullewa–Meekatharra railway was a section of the Northern Railway in Western Australia.

== History ==
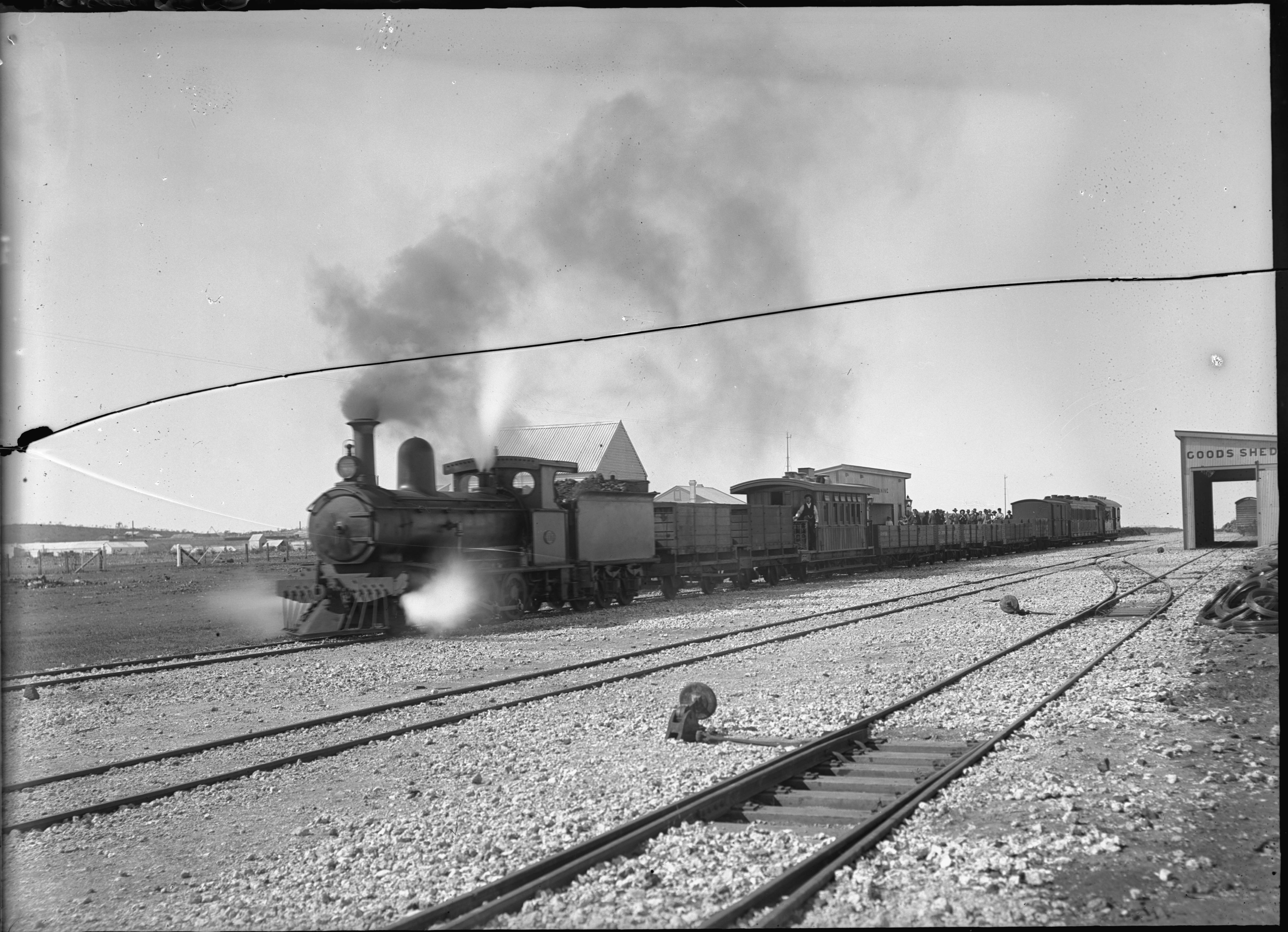
Steam train at Nannine railway station, c. 1905

The Mullewa–Cue Railway Act 1894, an act by the Parliament of Western Australia granted assent on 23 November 1894, authorised the construction of the railway line from Mullewa to Cue. Earlier in 1894, a syndicate of interstate investors headed by Charles G. Lush had proposed to build a private line, however on 30 May 1894, Premier John Forrest had stated that the government had decided to construct the line.

The contract to construct the first section of the railway line from Mullewa to Cue was awarded to Baxter & Prince on 16 December 1895, with the line officially opened on 1 July 1898.

The Cue–Nannine Railway Act 1896, assented to on 27 October 1896, authorised the construction of the railway line extension from Cue to Nannine. The second section from Cue to Nannine was awarded on 22 April 1901, now to the Western Australian Public Works Department. The line was officially opened on 1 June 1903.

The Nannine–Meekatharra Railway Act 1909, assented to on 6 February 1909, authorised the construction of the railway line extension from Nannine to Meekatharra. The contract for the final section from Nannine to Meekatharra was awarded on 29 October 1909, now to Smith & Timms. This section was opened on 11 August 1910.

== Branch lines ==
The Mount Magnet to Sandstone was a branch railway that connected with the Mullewa to Meekatharra railway line at Mount Magnet. The Mt. Magnet–Black Range Railway Act 1907 (No. 21 of 1907), assented to on 20 December 1907, authorised the construction of the railway line, while the Railway (Mt. Magnet–Black Range) Discontinuance Act 1948 (No. 67 of 1948), assented to on 21 January 1949, permitted its discontinuation. More specifically, the act permitted the removal of the line to be used for the construction or maintenance of other railway lines in the state, or to be sold by the ministry of railways.

The Meekatharra–Horseshoe Railway Act 1920, assented to on 31 December 1920, authorised the construction of the railway line from Meekatharra to the Horseshoe mine, north-west of Peak Hill. The private 85 miles (137 km)-long railway was short-lived, existing from 1927 until 1933, when the company mining manganese went into receivership.

The Meekatharra to Wiluna railway was an extension of the line in operation between 1932 and 1957. Constructed of this extension was authorised through the Meekatharra–Wiluna Railway Act 1927, which was assented to on 23 December 1927.

The Cue to Big Bell branch railway line was authorised for construction through the Cue–Big Bell Railway Act 1936, assented to on 3 November 1936. Prior to this, on 5 March 1936, the Western Australian government had entered an agreement with the American Smelting and Refining Company to build the railway to Big Bell.

== As part of the Northern Line ==
The Mullewa station was connected to both Geraldton, through the Geraldton to Mullewa railway line, and to Perth, and Meekatharra was not the final location of the line, but Wiluna – further east.

== Conditions ==
The Mullewa to Meekatharra line was regularly affected by washaways during wet weather.

== Closure ==
The Mullewa to Meekatharra line was closed on 1 May 1978.

The Railways Discontinuance Act 1980, assented to on 15 October 1980, authorised he discontinuance of the railway line from Pindar to Meekatharra.

== Sections ==
Mullewa to Meekatharra line sections:

- Mullewa, opened 1894 –
- Mullewa–Pindar – opened 1 July 1898 – closed November 1996
- Pindar–Cue – opened 1 July 1898 – closed 29 April 1978
  Mount Magnet – junction with Sandstone branch railway – 1 August 1910 – closed 28 May 1949
- Cue–Nannine – opened 1 June 1903 – closed 29 April 1978
  Cue – branch line to Big Bell, Western Australia – opened 2 August 1938– closed 1 January 1956
- Nannine–Meekatharra – opened 11 August 1910 – closed 29 April 1978
- Meekatharra – continued to Wiluna Branch Railway – opened 2 November 1932 – closed 5 August 1957

== Legacy ==
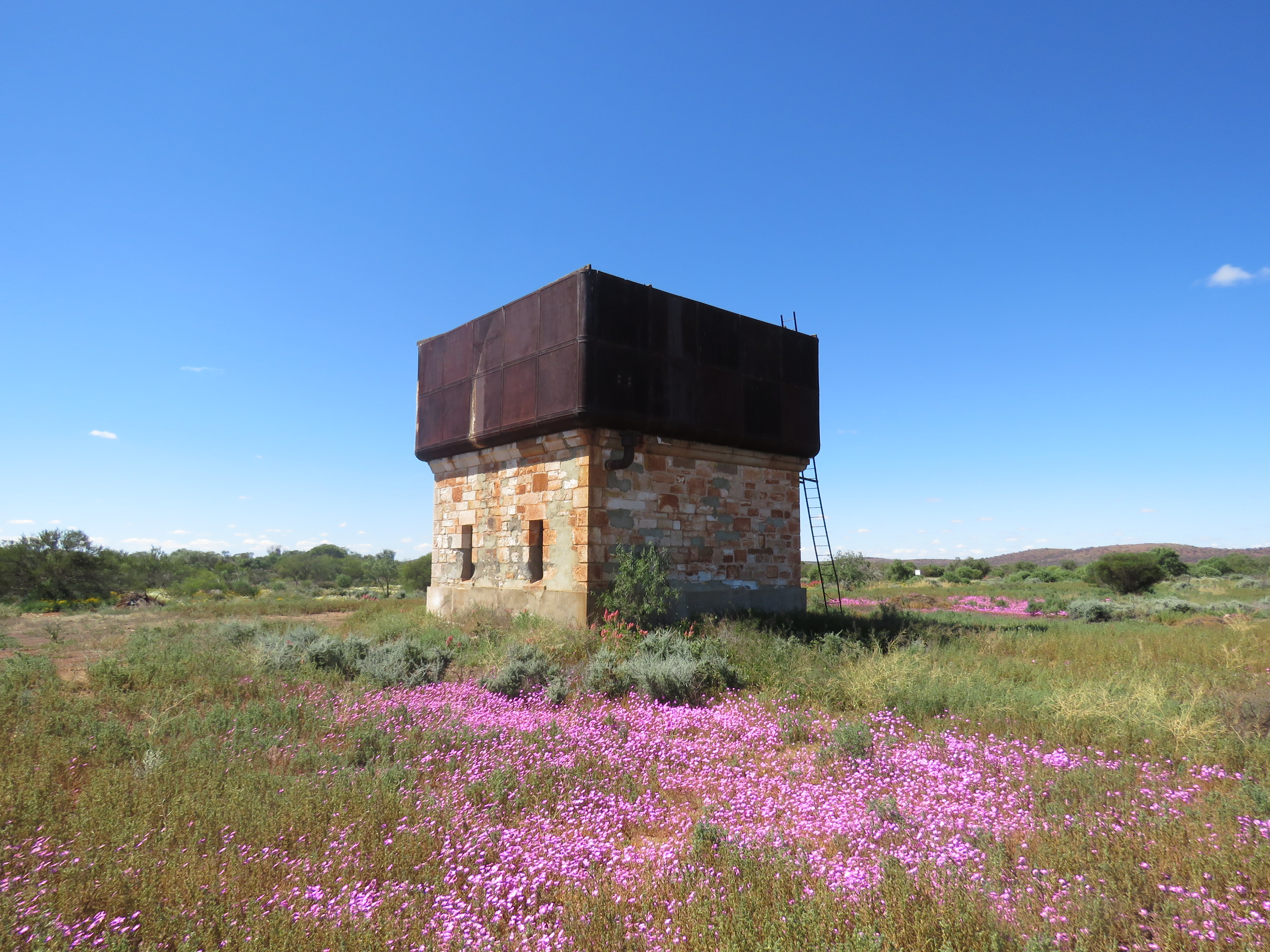
The state heritage listed iron water tank at Yalgoo

While all other trace of the former railway has disappeared from contemporary Western Australian railway maps, the 30 kilometres (19 mi) section from Mullewa to Pindar is designated as "Not in use" on the Public Transport Authority and Arc Infrastructure and maps.

A number of buildings and installations associated with the railway line continue to exist and are heritage listed.

The Mullewa railway station group is on the Western Australian State Register of Heritage Places, consisting of the station, goods shed and water tank. The station was completed in 1915 and remained operational until 1974.

Further east along the line, at Yalgoo, the railway station group is also on the State Register of Heritage Places. It consists of two water tanks, a station and a hotel.

At Mount Magnet, the railway station and platform, railway dam, railway bridge and the railway workers houses are on the Shire of Mount Magnet heritage list.

In the town of Cue, the railway station is also on the State Register of Heritage Places, which also includes workers cottages, the loading ramp and the station master's house.

At Meekatharra, the railway buildings, consisting of the station, a goods shed and a station masters house are on the Shire of Meekatharra heritage list. Meekatharra's rail infrastructure was actually enlarged after the line to Wiluna closed in 1957 as it became an important hub for transporting equipment for the developing iron ore mines in the Pilbara. This only changed with the roads in the region improving in the 1970s, which moved transport from the rail to the road.

== See also ==
- Western Australian Government Railways
- Rail transport in Western Australia
- Midland Railway Company of Western Australia
