= List of State Register of Heritage Places in the Shire of Chapman Valley =

List of heritage sites in Western Australia

The State Register of Heritage Places is maintained by the Heritage Council of Western Australia. As of 2026, 97 places are heritage-listed in the Shire of Chapman Valley, of which eight are on the State Register of Heritage Places.

== List ==
The Western Australian State Register of Heritage Places, as of 2026, lists the following eight state registered places within the Shire of Chapman Valley:

Place name	Place #	Street number	Street name	Suburb or town	Co-ordinates	Notes & former names	Photo
Nanson Convent	473	Lot 111	Chapman Valley Road	Nanson	28.566069°S 114.75512°E	Our Lady of Fatima Convent	
Nanson Roads Board Hall	474	13	East Terrace	Nanson	28.561185°S 114.758956°E	Nanson Roads Board Office	
Coffee Pot and Waggrakine Well	475	Lot 1455	Chapman Valley Road	Waggrakine	28.700193°S 114.673185°E	Coffee Plot	
Narra Tarra Homestead, Outbuildings & Cemetery	6353	982	Narra Tarra-Moonyoonooka Road	Narra Tarra	28°41′22″S 114°44′07″E	Also listed under the same number in the City of Greater Geraldton	
Cuddy Cuddy Changing Station	15838	Lot 1157	North West Coastal Highway	Howatharra	28.522244°S 114.630628°E	Howatharra Staging Post	
Nanson Convent	24940	Lot 111	Chapman Valley Road	Nanson	28.566069°S 114.75512°E		
Narra Tarra Homestead & Outbuildings	24941	Lot 11	Narra Tarra Road	Narra Tarra	28.692334°S 114.733007°E	Part of the Narra Tarra Homestead, Outbuildings & Cemetery precinct (6353)	
The Church of Our Lady Fatima	24961	2445	Chapman Valley Road	Nanson	28.565999°S 114.755443°E	School-Church of Our Lady of Fatima	
