= Paynesville, Western Australia =

Former town in Western Australia

Paynesville
- Town
- Coordinates: 28.107°S 118.5°E
- Country: Australia
- State: Western Australia
- LGA(s): Shire of Mount Magnet
- Location: 646 km (401 mi) north east of Perth; 77 km (48 mi) east of Mount Magnet,
- Established: 1900

Government
  - State electorate(s): North West
  - Federal division(s): Durack

Area
  - Total: 3,328.3 km^{2} (1,285.1 sq mi)
- Elevation: 446 m (1,463 ft)

Population
  - Total(s): 0 (SAL 2021)
- Postcode: 6638

Paynesville is a ghost town and locality in the Mid West region of Western Australia between the towns of Mount Magnet and Sandstone.

Gold was discovered in 1898 in the immediate area by the prospectors Thomas Payne and Waldeck; Paynes Find is also named after Thomas Payne. The townsite was surveyed in 1898 and was initially known as Paynton and East Mount Magnet and also known as Fords after another prospector who had worked the area.

A local board of Health was established in the town in 1898.

By 1899 the town became known as Paynesville and the town was gazetted in 1900. In 1910 the Sandstone branch railway from Mount Magnet to Black Range was opened with Paynesville having a station on the line.

An ore battery was built close to the town but later moved to Nunngarra in 1904.

At the 2016 Australian census, Paynesville had a population of ten people.
