= Paroo Station =

Pastoral lease in Western Australia

Coordinates: 26.262°S 119.767°E

Location in Western Australia

Paroo Station, often referred to as Paroo, is a pastoral lease that operates as a cattle station.

It is located about 58 kilometres (36 mi) north west of Wiluna and 132 kilometres (82 mi) east of Meekatharra in the Mid West region of Western Australia. The Meekatharra–Wiluna railway used to traverse the property.

Frederick Albert Crews along with his son C. V. Crews and Reginald Grant acquired Paroo in 1923 and set about stocking the property with sheep. Crews and Grant put Paroo up for auction in 1927 after they dissolved their partnership. At this time Paroo occupied an area of 423,000 acres (171,182 ha) and was stocked with 5,500 sheep. Approximately 140,000 acres (56,656 ha) had been enclosed by 140 miles (225 km) of fencing dividing it into 10 paddocks. Stock were watered by 14 wells, most which were equipped with mills and troughs. The Crews family retained Paroo and appointed J. C. Baker as station manager.

In 1934 the property was put back on the market after Clarrie Crews fell to ill health. At his time the station occupied an area of 442,605 acres (179,116 ha) and divided into 14 large paddocks. The property boundary was almost completed fenced, falling 25 miles (40 km) short of finishing the boundary fence. The property had 21 wells and was stocked with 8,000 sheep.

In 1950 the station produced 115 bales of wool from a flock of 4,500 sheep.

== See also ==
- List of ranches and stations
