= St James' Church, Greenough =

Church in Australia

St James' Anglican Church, Greenough

Religion
- Affiliation: Anglican
- Region: Mid West
- Ecclesiastical or organisational status: Parish church
- Status: Abandoned

Location
- Location: 33583 Brand Hwy, South Greenough, Western Australia
- Municipality: City of Greater Geraldton
- State: Western Australia
- Interactive map of St James' Anglican Church, Greenough
- Coordinates: 29.004°S 114.796°E

Architecture
- Type: Chapel
- Style: Victorian Romanesque
- Groundbreaking: 1868
- Materials

Western Australia Heritage Register
- Official name: St James' Anglican Church, South Greenough
- Type: State Registered Place
- Designated: 29 October 2010
- Reference no.: 1145

St. James Church in South Greenough, Western Australia, was built in 1872. It was listed as a historic building in 2010.
