= Paroo, Western Australia =

Town in Western Australia

Coordinates: 26°37′01″S 119°33′22″E

Paroo is a locality in the Mid West region of Western Australia. It was a stop on the now closed Wiluna Branch Railway which ran between 1932 and 1957.

The locality was also known as White Well.

It was also a point of intersection with the Rabbit-Proof Fence number 1.

According to Western Australian Government Railways, the former railway station altitude was the highest in the Western Australia railway system in the 1940s, being 1,916 feet (584 m) above sea level.
