= West End, Western Australia =

West End
- Suburb
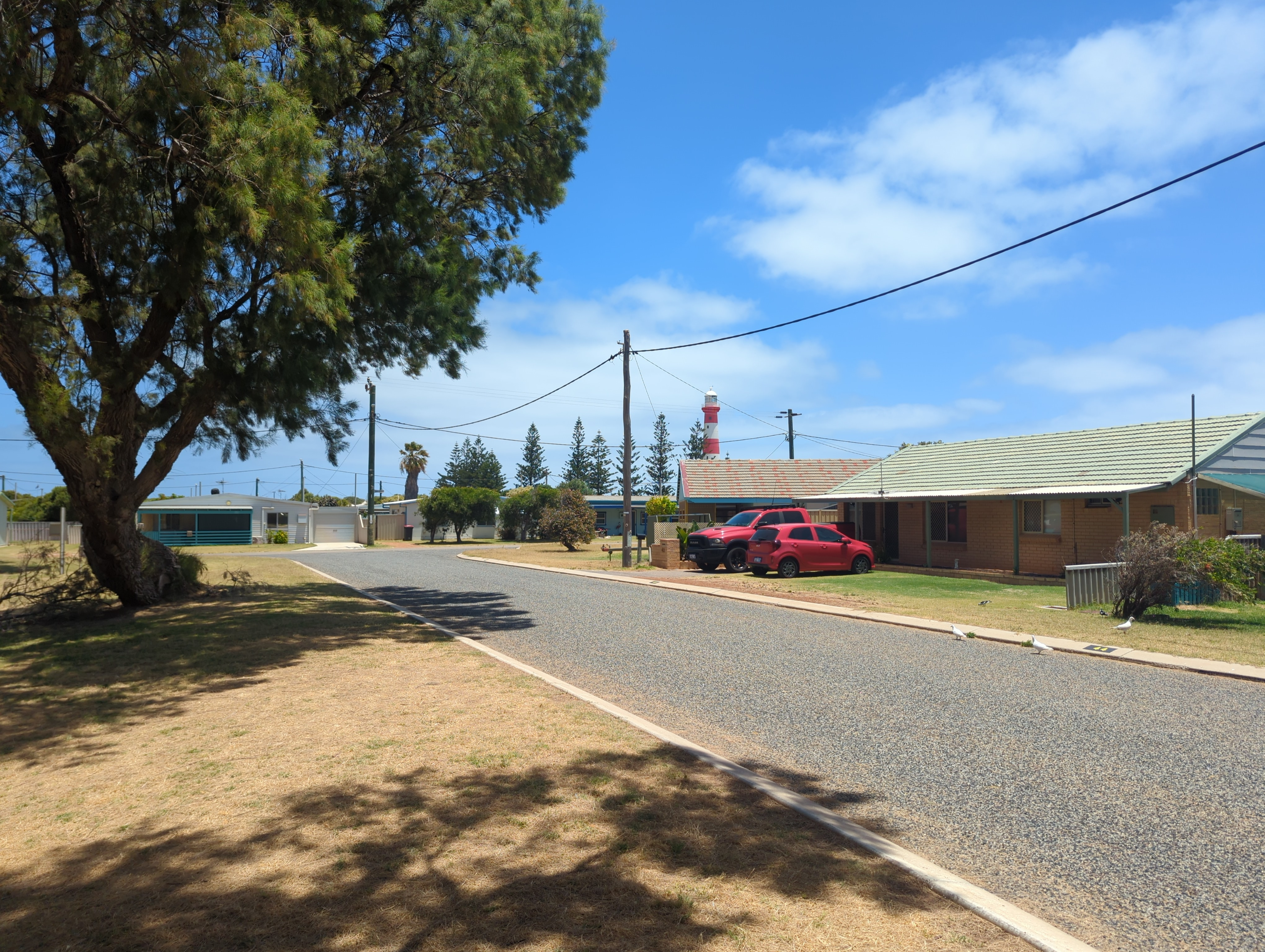
- Picture of West End, Western Australia. The Point Moore Lighthouse can be seen in the distance.

- Coordinates: 28°46′55″S 114°35′20″E
- Country: Australia
- State: Western Australia
- City: Geraldton
- LGA(s): City of Greater Geraldton
- Location: 4 km (2.5 mi) W of Geraldton

Government
  - State electorate(s): Geraldton
  - Federal division(s): Durack

Area
  - Total: 2.3 km^{2} (0.89 sq mi)

Population
  - Total(s): 536 (SAL 2021)
- Postcode: 6530
Suburbs around West End
	Indian Ocean	Geraldton
Indian Ocean	West End	Beachlands
	Indian Ocean	Beachlands

West End is a western suburb of Geraldton, Western Australia. Its local government area is the City of Greater Geraldton.

The suburb was gazetted in 1972.

== Geography ==
West End is located on a peninsula extending to the west of Geraldton's central business district. While the suburb is mostly industrial and contains much of the Port of Geraldton's infrastructure, West End also hosts a small residential area, as well as a nature park on the coast around the peninsula.

== Demographics ==
In the 2006 census, West End had a population of 312, with a median age of 55 - some 20 years above the regional average. Nearly half of West End residents live in caravans or other non-permanent accommodation.

== Facilities ==
- Belair Gardens Caravan Park
- Point Moore
- Point Moore Lighthouse
- Pages Beach
- Greys Beach
- Geraldton Volunteer Marine Rescue Base
