= Tardun, Western Australia =

Tardun
- Town
- Coordinates: 28°47′35″S 115°45′02″E
- Country: Australia
- State: Western Australia
- LGA(s): City of Greater Geraldton
- Location: 427 km (265 mi) north of Perth; 36 km (22 mi) south east of Mullewa; 111 km (69 mi) east of Geraldton
- Established: 1913

Government
  - Federal division(s): Durack

Area
  - Total: 632.6 km^{2} (244.2 sq mi)
- Elevation: 330 m (1,080 ft)

Population
  - Total(s): 23 (SAL 2021)
- Postcode: 6628

Tardun is a small town in the Mid West region of Western Australia.

The townsite is located along the Mullewa to Wongan Hills railway line. The location of the town was decided in 1913 when the route of the railway was being planned. The name of the town was originally Undatarra when it was gazetted in 1913, it was then changed to Tardun in 1925 and lots were surveyed in 1927.

== Education ==
The Christian Brothers Agricultural School was founded in Tardun in 1928 for child migrants from Britain. It closed in 2009. In testimony before a British parliamentary committee investigating British child migrants sent to Australia in the late 1990s, one boy spoke of the criminal abuse he received from Catholic priests at Tardun. He testified that several of them competed to see who would be the first to rape him 100 times. They liked his blue eyes, so he repeatedly beat himself in the hope they would change colour. As parliamentarians reflected at the time, the term "sexual abuse" seemed wholly inadequate given the awfulness of his experience.

In December 2014, the Royal Commission into Institutional Responses to Child Sexual Abuse found that "Christian Brothers leaders knew of allegations of sexual abuse of children at four WA orphanages, including Tardun, and failed to manage the homes to prevent the systemic ill-treatment for decades." It also found that the institution was concerned by the cost of legal proceedings, and "there was no sentiment of recognising the suffering of the survivors."
