= Northern Railway (Western Australia) =

Railway lines in Western Australia

The Northern Railway has had a number of meanings in Western Australian railway history.

== Northampton Line ==
Opening in 1879 the Northern Line originated as a service between Geraldton port and mines at Northampton. It later extended to Ajana.

It was the first government built railway in Western Australia; other lines had been built prior to this date, but they were privately built. The Northampton line was serviced by two Fairlie double ended steam engines (which were some of the few to run in Australia) and two Kitson engines. The Northampton line was closed in 1957.

== Midland Railway ==
In 1886 the government of Western Australia contracted West Australian Midland Land and Railway Syndicate to build the Midland Railway of Western Australia line between Guildford and Walkaway. The contract was authorised under the Guildford–Greenough Flats Railway Act 1886, and included a grant of Crown land in return for construction. From Walkaway to Geraldton there was no Crown land available to grant and the government employed Edward V. H. Keane to construct this section for them completing the link from Perth to Northampton line, which opened 1 July 1887.

== Northern Railway ==
Built by the Western Australian Government Railways during the 1890–1900 the Northern Railway provided for passenger and freight services from Perth into the Murchison Goldfields.

There was a branch line from Cue to the mining town of Big Bell. After the completion of the line to Cue work commenced on the line to Nannine, it was not until 1909 that the line was extended from Nannine to Meekatharra and for a while to Wiluna.

During the 1970s passenger services were terminated at Mullewa with services to places further along the line being replaced by road coach, while the overnight passenger service "The Mullewa" ceased altogether 1974.

== Joondalup Line ==
During the pre-construction stages the Joondalup line was referred to as the Northern line or Northern suburbs line. The line was renamed the Yanchep line on 14 July 2024.

== Northern Railway in annual reports ==
The Annual Report for the Western Australian Government Railways in 1948 shows the subdivisions of the Northern Railway as:

- Geraldton – Northampton
- Northampton – Ajana
- Wokarina – Naraling
- Naraling – Yuna
- Geraldton – Walkaway
- Narngulu – Mullewa
- Mullewa – Cue
- Mt Magnet – Sandstone
- Cue – Big Bell
- Cue – Nannine
- Nannine – Meekatharra
- Meekatharra – Paroo
- Paroo – Wiluna

== See also ==
- Western Australian Government Railways
- Rail transport in Western Australia
- Midland Railway Company of Western Australia
