= Wiluna railway line =

Former railway line in Western Australia

Meekatharra–Wiluna railway

Overview
- Status: Closed
- Locale: Mid West, Western Australia
- Termini: Meekatharra; Wiluna

History
- Commenced: 1929
- Opened: 2 November 1932
- Closed: 5 August 1957

Technical
- Line length: 176 km (109 mi)
- Track gauge: 1,067 mm (3 ft 6 in)
- Meekatharra–Wiluna railway Main locations

The Meekatharra to Wiluna railway (often referred to as the Wiluna railway) was a 113-mile (182 km) branch line of the Western Australian Government Railways that extended the Mullewa – Meekatharra railway from Meekatharra to Wiluna and operated between 1932 and 1957. Wiluna was the furthest rail terminus from Perth on the Western Australian Government Railways system. Paroo was the highest station, at 1,916 feet (584 m) above sea level; the highest point on the Western Australian railway network, west of Paroo, was 2,134 feet (650 m).

== Overview ==
The Meekatharra–Wiluna Railway Act 1927, an act by the Parliament of Western Australia granted assent on 23 December 1927, authorised the construction of the railway line from Meekatharra to Wiluna.

Construction began in the late 1920s, and the line operated between 1932 and 1957, mainly serving the Wiluna gold mining area.

However Wiluna was also at the end of the 1,900-kilometre (1,200 mi) Canning Stock Route from Halls Creek in the Kimberley region, and so the railway became a vital means of dispatching cattle intended for southern markets.

The track was susceptible to washaways.

There had been consideration of linking Wiluna with Leonora by rail in the 1920s.

== Intermediate stopping points ==
- Meekatharra - 600 miles (970 km) from Perth
- Gnaweeda - 615 miles (990 km)
- Richardson - 628 miles (1,011 km)
- Yaganoo - 628 miles (1,011 km)
- Paroo - 667 miles (1,073 km)
- Wiluna - ~709 miles (1,141 km)

== Closure ==
The two sections – Meekatharra to Paroo (107.7 km) and Paroo to Wiluna (68.3 km) – were closed on 5 August 1957.

The Railways (Cue-Big Bell and other Railways) Discontinuance Act 1960, which officially closed the Meekatharra to Wiluna line, was assented to on 12 December 1960. This act affected a number of Western Australian railways, officially closing 13 railway lines in the state.

== Legacy ==
At Meekatharra, the railway buildings – consisting of the station, a goods shed and a station masters house – are on the Shire of Meekatharra heritage list. Meekatharra's rail infrastructure was enlarged after the line to Wiluna closed in 1957 as it became an important hub for transporting equipment for the developing iron ore mines in the Pilbara. This only changed with the roads in the region improving in the 1970s, which moved transport from the rail to the road.

At the Wiluna end of the line, the railway goods shed dating back to the 1930s is on the shire's heritage list. It is the only building remaining in town of the railway era, the rest having been demolished in the 1990s.
