= Pindar, Western Australia =

Town in Western Australia

Pindar
- Town
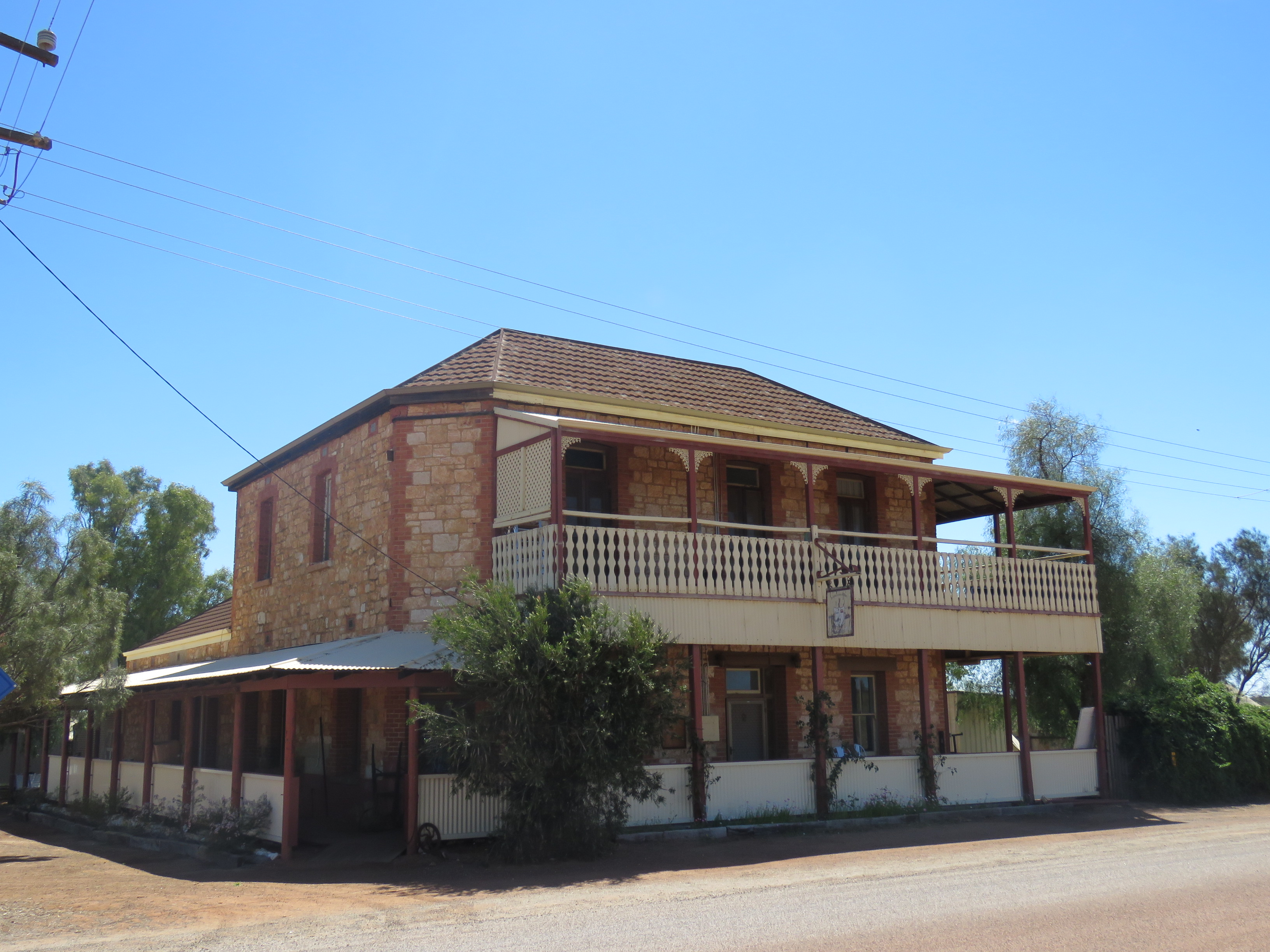
- The Pindar Hotel in September 2021

- Coordinates: 28°28′41″S 115°47′20″E
- Country: Australia
- State: Western Australia
- LGA(s): City of Greater Geraldton

Government
  - State electorate(s): Moore
  - Federal division(s): Durack

Area
  - Total: 2,175.3 km^{2} (839.9 sq mi)

Population
  - Total(s): 13 (SAL 2021)
- Postcode: 6532

Pindar is a small town in the Mid West Region of Western Australia. It is located about 30 km east of Mullewa in the local government area of the City of Greater Geraldton.

In 1894, the Northern Railway from Geraldton to Mullewa was opened, and four years later was extended to Cue. A railway station was built at Pindar to service outlying farms, and the townsite of Pindar was gazetted on 22 February 1901.

The surrounding areas produce wheat and other cereal crops. The town was a receival site for Cooperative Bulk Handling.

== Transport ==
Until the 1970s, it was served by a narrow gauge line on the Western Australian Government Railways. The railway to Cue was closed on 29 April 1978 but grain freight services to the west continued on a seasonal basis for some years but it is now permanently closed.

The main feature these days of the (former) town is the iconic building that was a hotel and now a Bed and Breakfast in tourist season. It was built by Mr Emmott Gill and his wife (formally Mrs Tom Jones) in 1907. There are two magnificent paintings of this building done by the renowned artist, the late Ailsa Small, which are housed in the former Shire Chambers of the Mullewa Shire Offices now all part of the Greater Geraldton Council. In its day it was reputed to be a most profitable hotel. The two-story building remains remarkably good shape.
