= Mullewa, Western Australia =

Mullewa
- Town
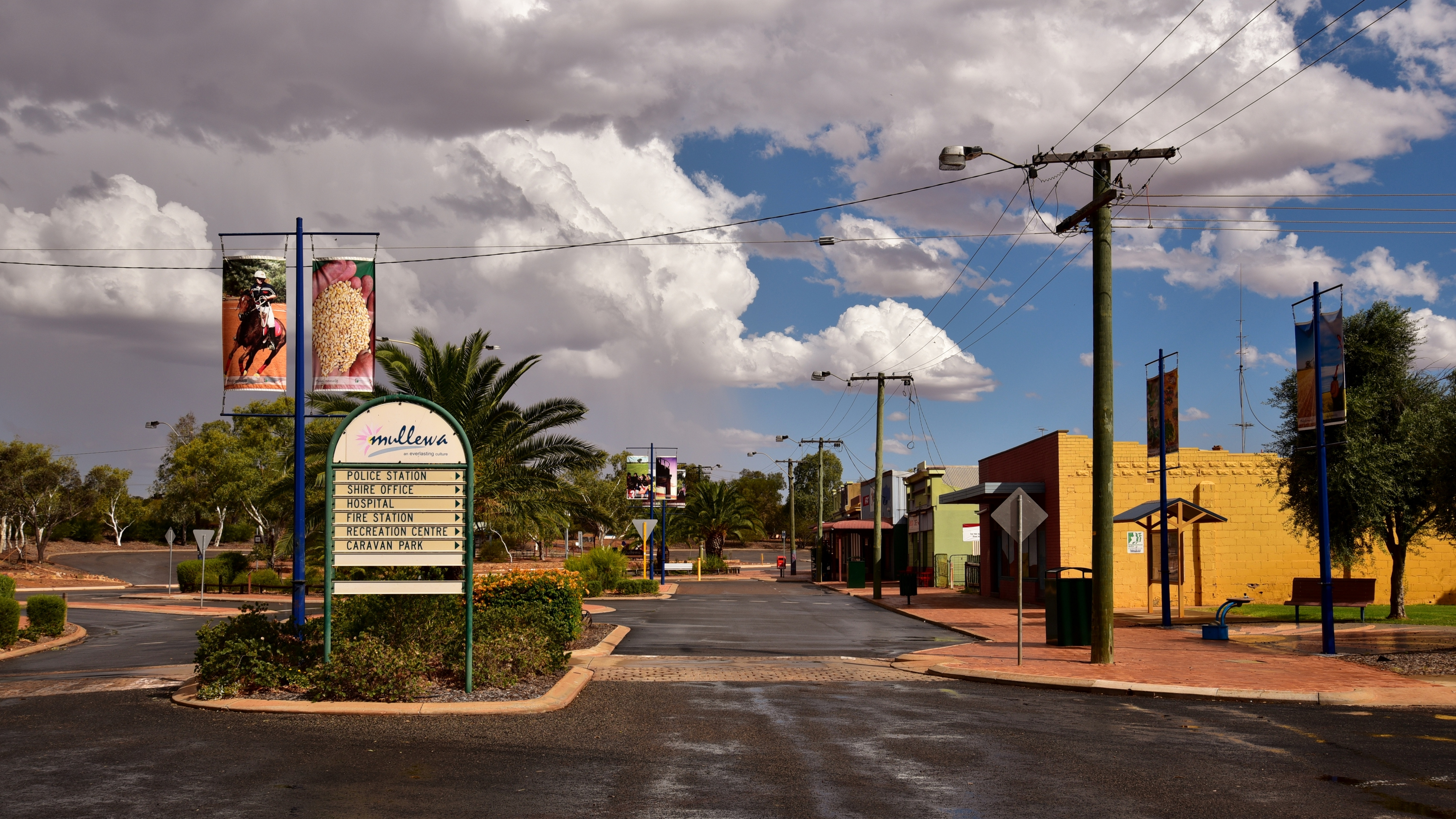
- Jose Street, Mullewa, 2018

- Interactive map of Mullewa
- Coordinates: 28°32′13″S 115°30′43″E
- Country: Australia
- State: Western Australia
- LGA: City of Greater Geraldton
- Location: 450 km (280 mi) N of Perth; 98 km (61 mi) ENE of Geraldton
- Established: 1894

Government
  - State electorate: Moore
  - Federal division: Durack

Area
  - Total: 415.1 km^{2} (160.3 sq mi)
- Elevation: 281 m (922 ft)

Population
  - Total: 312 (UCL 2021)
- Postcode: 6630

Mullewa is a town in the Mid West region of Western Australia, 450 kilometres (280 mi) north of Perth and 98 kilometres (61 mi) east-northeast of Geraldton. Mullewa is well known for its abundance of wildflowers in the spring and is one of the few places in Western Australia where the wreath flower grows. The surrounding areas produce wheat and other cereal crops. The town is a receival site for Cooperative Bulk Handling.

== History ==
European settlers moved to the area in 1869 to take up pastoral leases for farming. In 1894, the government built a narrow gauge railway line from Geraldton to Mullewa and the town was gazetted in the same year. The town is named after Mullewa Spring, whose name is based on an Aboriginal name recorded by surveyor John Forrest in 1873. The meaning of the name is not certain, but the most accepted meaning is "place of fog".

== Church of Our Lady of Mt. Carmel and the Holy Apostles St. Peter and St. Paul and Priesthouse ==
The architect priest Mgr John Hawes built the Church mainly with his own hands and the help of parishioners. Work started in 1921 and the stone and tile church was completed, after some interruptions, in 1927. The eclectic design of the Church shows some influence of Spanish Mission style. Hawes built a presbytery for himself next to the church and this, known as the Priesthouse, was finished in 1929: it has been used as a museum since 1980.

Images of Our Lady of Mt. Carmel complex

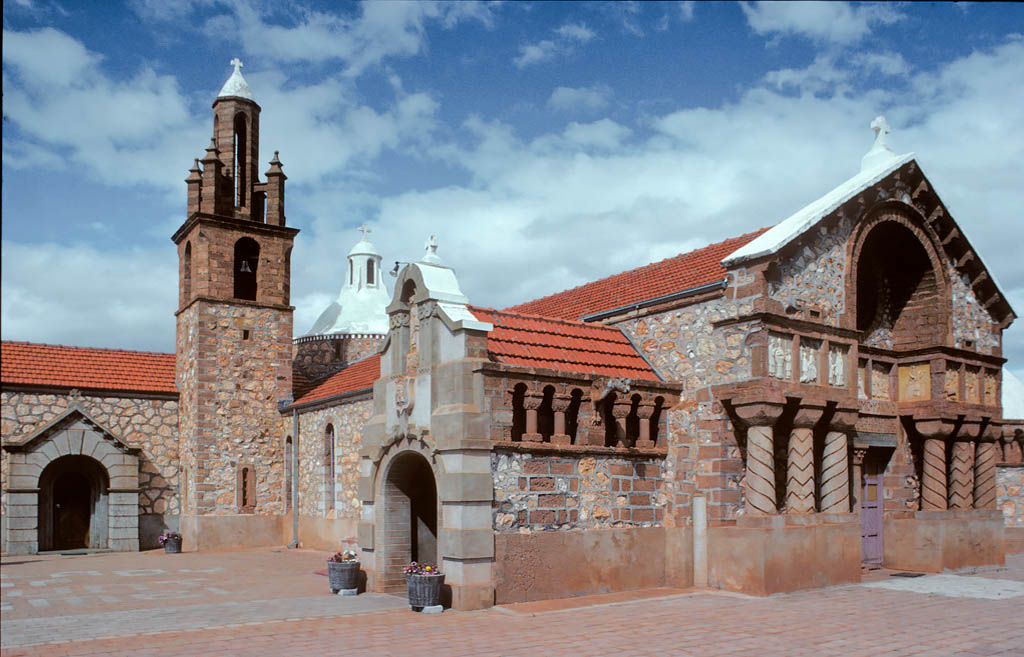
The Church, front

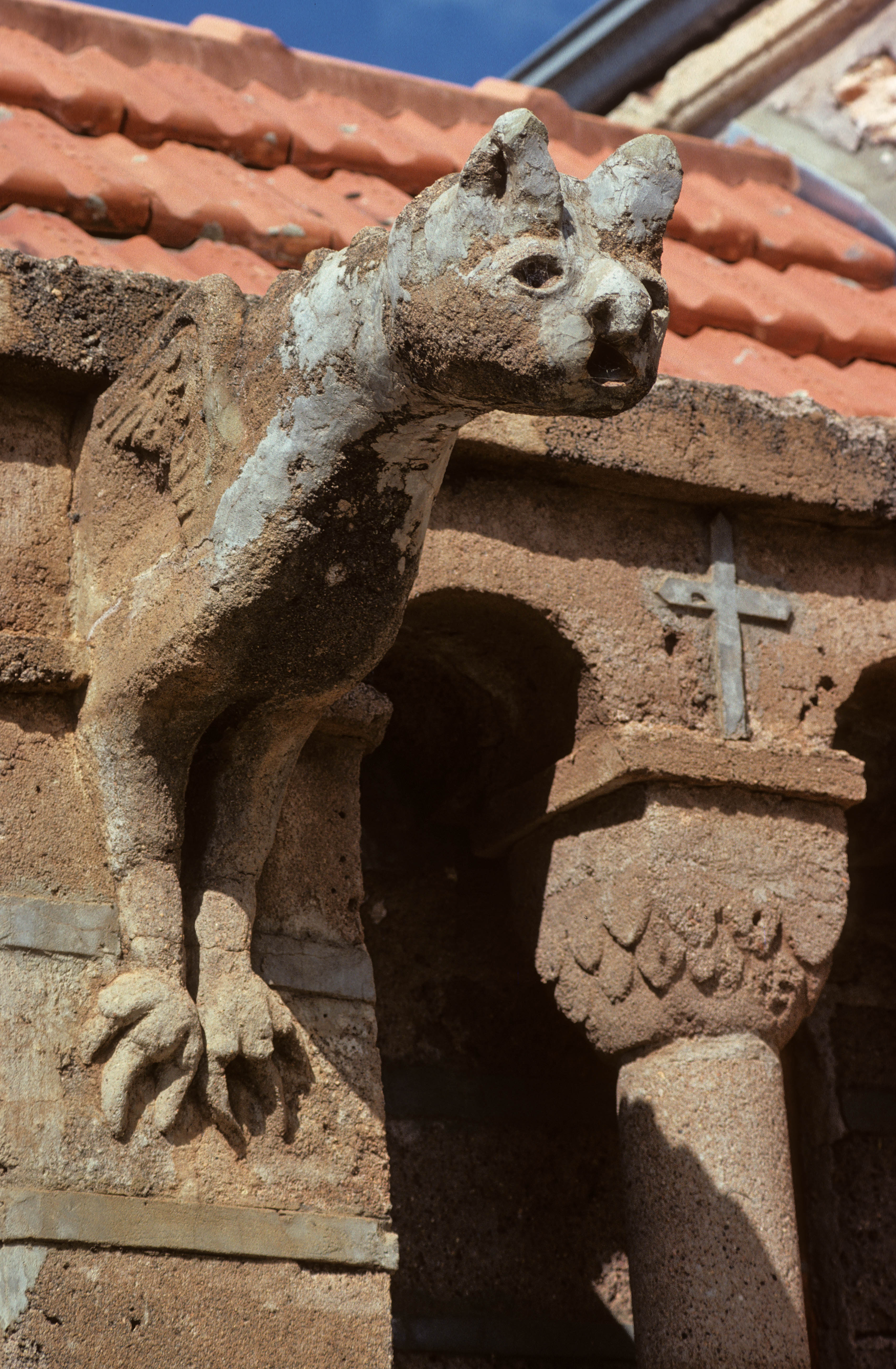
Gargoyle on the Church

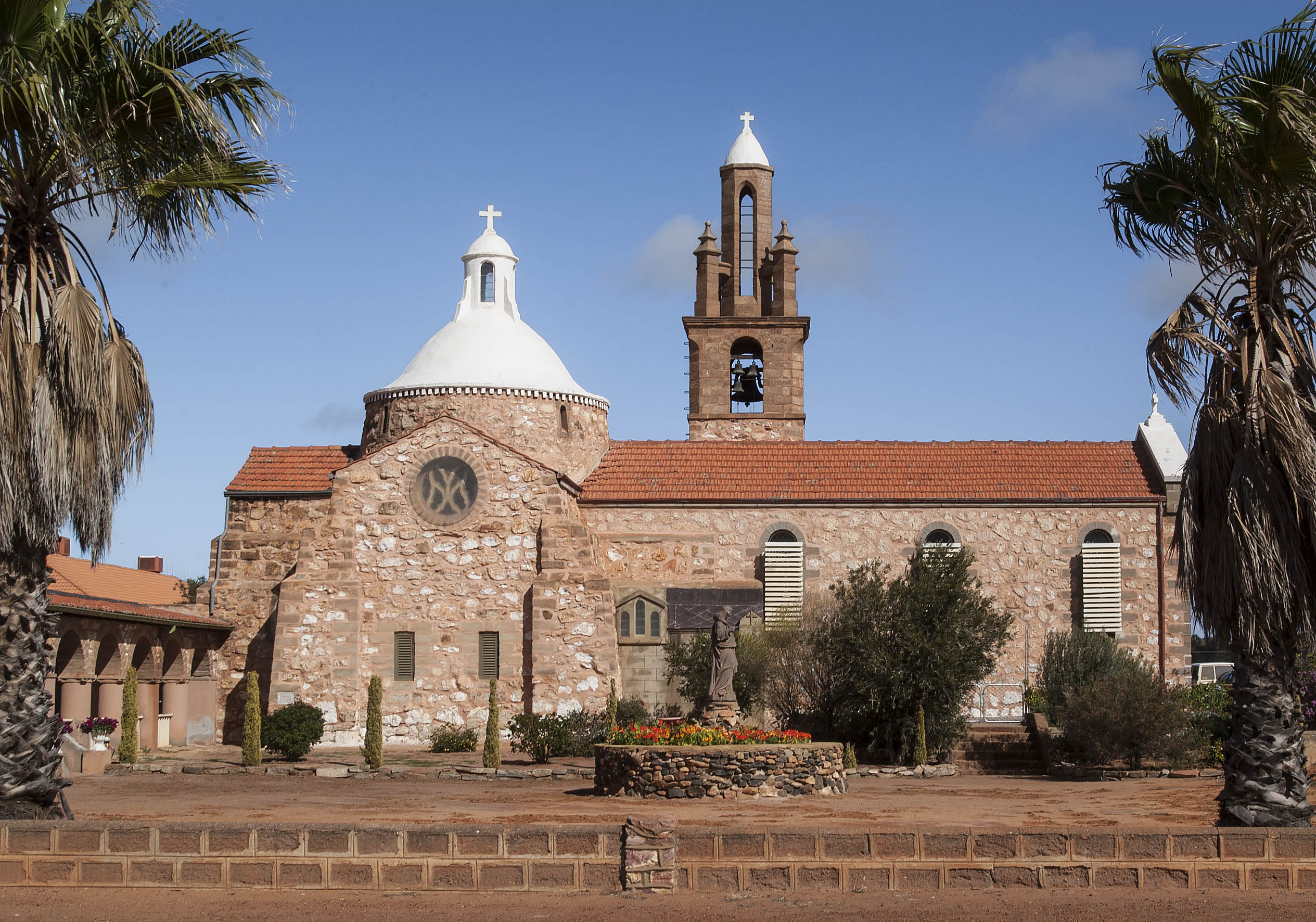
Church, side view

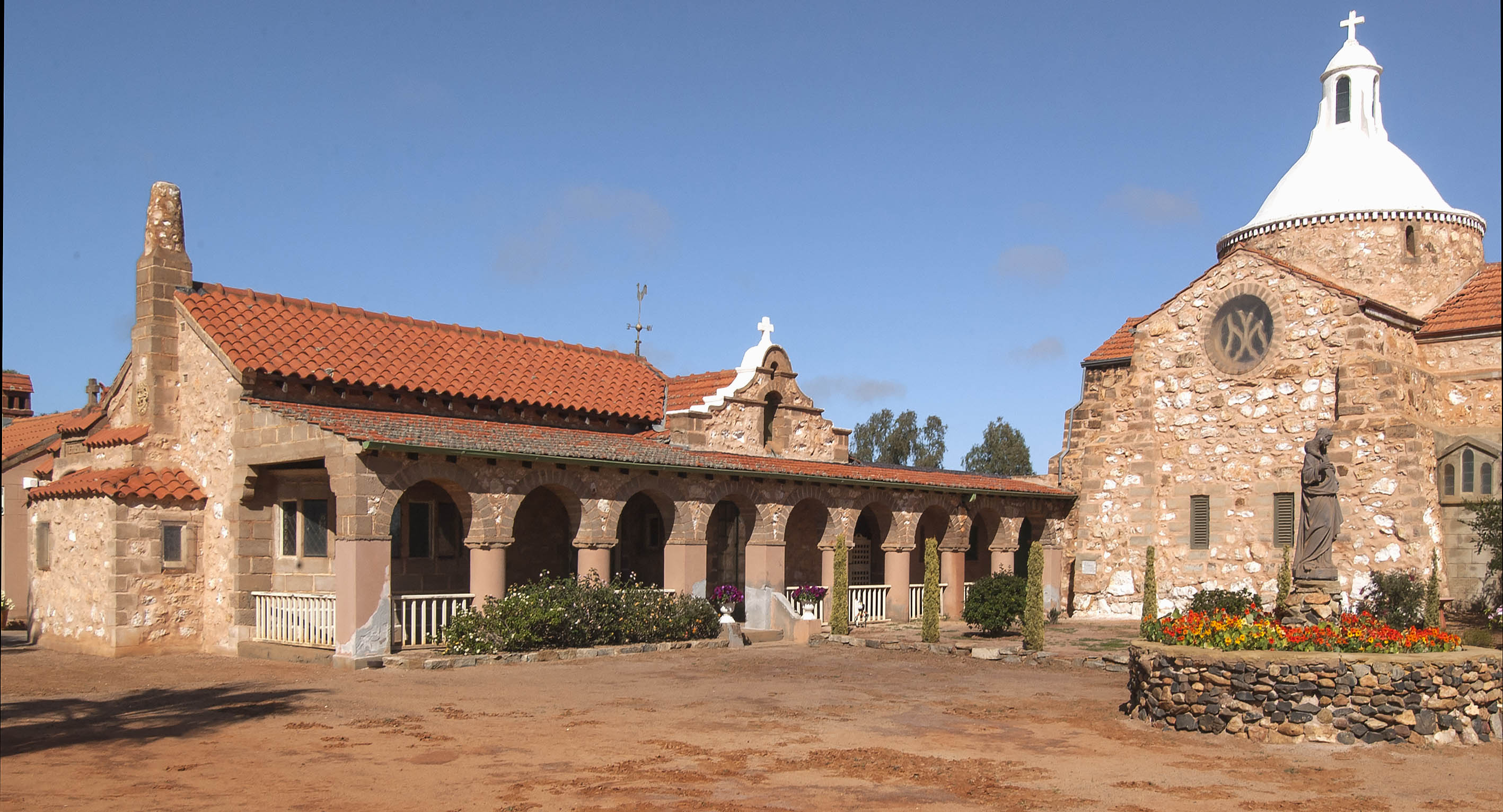
Priesthouse and Church

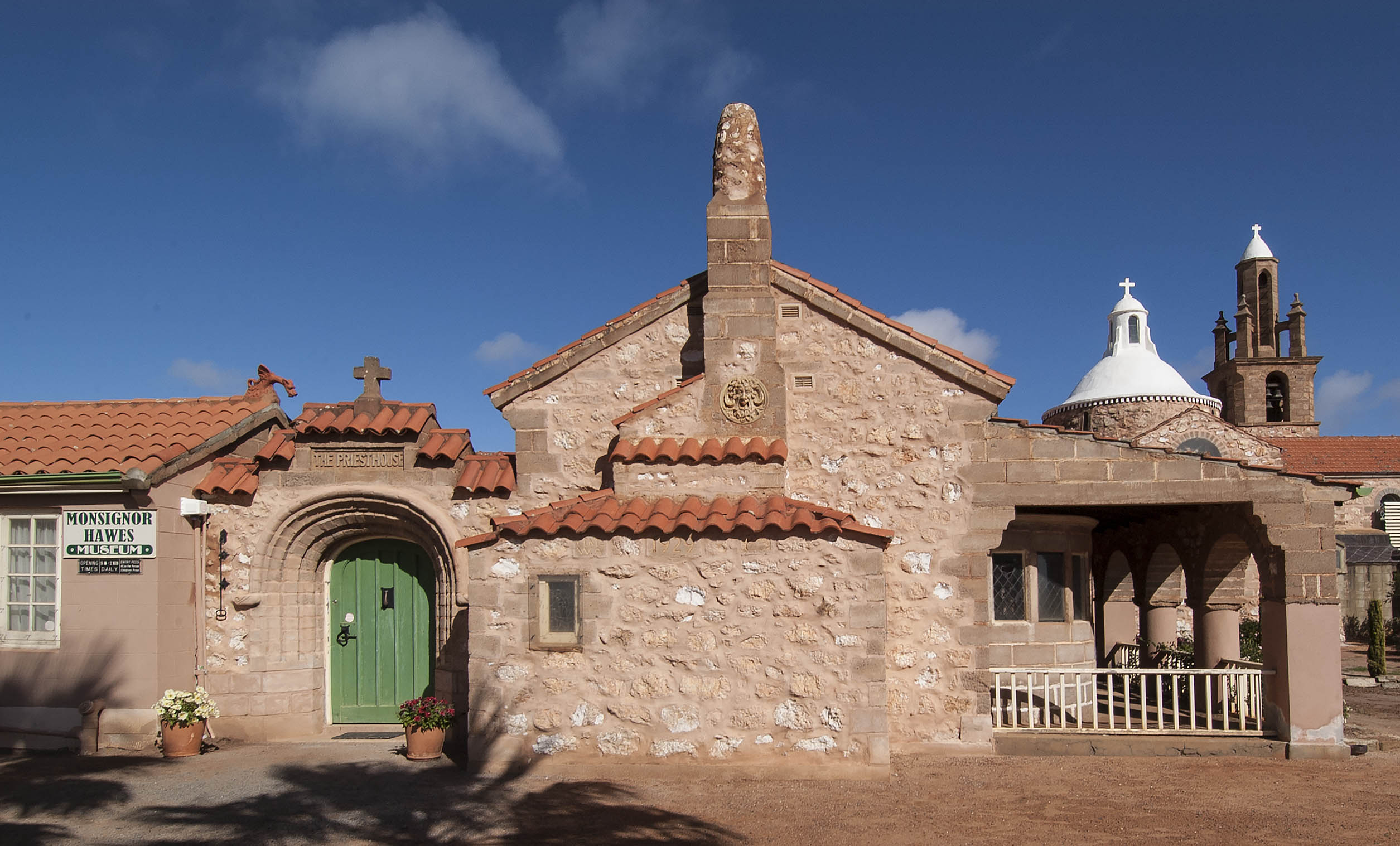
Priesthouse, street view

== Rail service ==
One of the Western Australian Government Railways named overnight passenger services from Perth was known as The Mullewa, which ceased operation in 1974.

=== Junction ===
Mullewa was the junction of the railway line west to Geraldton, the Geraldton to Mullewa railway line, northeast to Meekatharra, the Mullewa–Meekatharra railway, and south to Northam, the Avon Yard to Mullewa railway line connected Mullewa to the railway system south to Perth.

=== Isolation ===
The Meekatharra line was closed in 1978, and, as of 2024, the southward line is operationally disconnected from the southern WA railway system; a 104-kilometre (65 mi) section of that line from Perenjori to Dalwallinu was closed in the late 1990s due to the decline of the tonnage on the line. Iron ore from Tallering Peak mine (operational 2003 – 2014) was hauled by road 65 km south to Mullewa, and loaded onto railway wagons for hauling 107 km west-southwest to Geraldton, where ships of up to 60,000 DWT were loaded.

== Media ==
=== Radio ===
Radio services available in Mullewa:

- ABC Midwest & Wheatbelt (6GN 828 AM) – Part of the ABC Local Radio Network.
- ABC Radio National – (6ABCRN 99.7 FM) – Speciality talk and music.
- Triple J – (6JJJ 98.9 FM) – Alternative music
- ABC News Radio – (6PNN 101.3 FM) – Rolling News bulletins, news magazine programs and LIVE coverage from Federal Parliament House of Representatives.
- WAFM (96.5FM) – Top 40 Music
- The Spirit Network (Radio 6BAY FM 98.1/1512 AM) – Classic Hits / Adult Contemporary Music format aimed at 35 years + audience.
- Radio Mama (100.5FM) – Indigenous Community station

=== Television ===
Free-to-air broadcast television services available in Mullewa:

- Australian Broadcasting Corporation (ABC) – ABC1, ABC2, ABC3, ABC News 24 (digital channels)
- Special Broadcasting Service (SBS) – SBS One, SBS Two, SBS HD (digital channels)
- WIN Television, a dual affiliate of both the Nine Network and Network Ten.
- GWN7 (Golden West Network), an affiliate of the Seven Network.

The programming schedule is mainly the same as the Seven, Nine and Ten stations in Perth, with variations for news bulletins, sport telecasts such as the Australian Football League and National Rugby League, children's and lifestyle programs and advertorials. GWN7 produces a 30-minute regional news program each weeknight (originating from Bunbury) with a newsroom based in Geraldton, covering the local area.

== Climate ==
Mullewa has a hot semi-arid climate (Köppen BSh) with sweltering summers and pleasant to warm winters. The town features a dry summer/wetter winter routine, thus giving its climate some characteristics of the Mediterranean one.

Climate data for Mullewa
| Month | Jan | Feb | Mar | Apr | May | Jun | Jul | Aug | Sep | Oct | Nov | Dec | Year |
|---|---|---|---|---|---|---|---|---|---|---|---|---|---|
| Record high °C (°F) | 47.3 (117.1) | 47.1 (116.8) | 44.0 (111.2) | 41.7 (107.1) | 35.5 (95.9) | 29.5 (85.1) | 28.9 (84.0) | 34.8 (94.6) | 38.5 (101.3) | 41.0 (105.8) | 44.0 (111.2) | 45.5 (113.9) | 47.3 (117.1) |
| Mean daily maximum °C (°F) | 36.9 (98.4) | 36.6 (97.9) | 33.8 (92.8) | 28.8 (83.8) | 23.9 (75.0) | 20.1 (68.2) | 18.9 (66.0) | 20.3 (68.5) | 23.6 (74.5) | 27.4 (81.3) | 31.2 (88.2) | 34.6 (94.3) | 28.0 (82.4) |
| Mean daily minimum °C (°F) | 19.6 (67.3) | 20.2 (68.4) | 18.5 (65.3) | 15.1 (59.2) | 11.3 (52.3) | 8.6 (47.5) | 7.1 (44.8) | 7.2 (45.0) | 8.7 (47.7) | 11.3 (52.3) | 14.5 (58.1) | 17.2 (63.0) | 13.3 (55.9) |
| Record low °C (°F) | 9.0 (48.2) | 10.0 (50.0) | 7.4 (45.3) | 5.0 (41.0) | 1.4 (34.5) | −0.3 (31.5) | −1.2 (29.8) | −1.4 (29.5) | 0.0 (32.0) | 2.8 (37.0) | 6.0 (42.8) | 7.2 (45.0) | −1.4 (29.5) |
| Average rainfall mm (inches) | 13.2 (0.52) | 18.9 (0.74) | 20.4 (0.80) | 21.3 (0.84) | 45.1 (1.78) | 63.3 (2.49) | 58.7 (2.31) | 42.4 (1.67) | 21.2 (0.83) | 13.0 (0.51) | 8.8 (0.35) | 8.3 (0.33) | 335.0 (13.19) |
| Average rainy days (≥ 1.0 mm) | 1.5 | 1.8 | 1.8 | 2.6 | 5.0 | 7.3 | 7.9 | 6.4 | 3.9 | 2.5 | 1.5 | 1.3 | 43.5 |
