= Pichi Richi =

Pichi Richi or Pitchi Richi may refer to the following items in Australia:

== South Australia ==
- Pichi Richi Pass, a pass in the southern Flinders Ranges
- Pichi Richi Railway, a heritage railway
- Hundred of Pichi Richi, a cadastral unit

== Northern Territory ==
- Pitchi Richi Sanctuary, a former tourist attraction near Alice Springs
