= Jim Bowditch =

Australian newspaper editor (1919–1996)

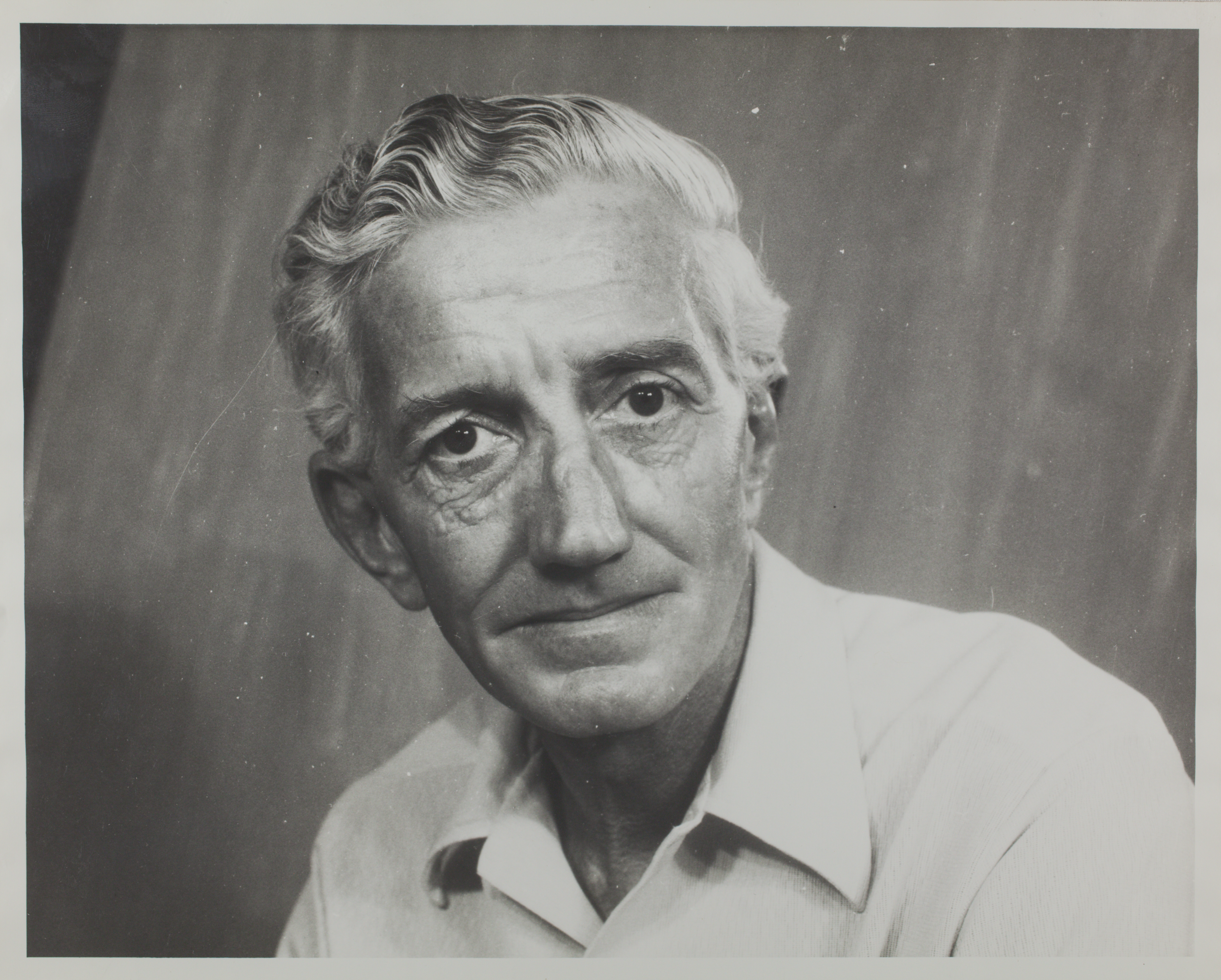
Jim Bowditch, photo taken by ABC TV

James "Jim" Bowditch, (1919–1996) was an Australian newspaper editor who worked for the Alice Springs-based Centralian Advocate from 1950 to 1954 and the Darwin-based Northern Territory News from 1954 to 1973.

During his editorial career Bowditch campaigned for Aboriginal rights and a better deal for the Northern Territory from Canberra.

== Early life ==
Bowditch was born in London, part of a working–class family and one of five children. He left school aged 14 to support his family through the Great Depression and, aged 17, worked his passage to Australia on Port Dunedin in order to fulfil his childhood dream of becoming a farmer.

Once in Australia, he worked on a number of farms in New South Wales and Queensland, before moving to Wellington, New South Wales to search for gold. This venture was unsuccessful and he was soon forced to apply for a travelling dole scheme which required him to move from town-to-town in order to receive benefits.

At the outbreak of World War II, Bowditch joined the Australian Army and served in North Africa and New Guinea (as a part of the Second Ninth Infantry Battalion) before joining the special sabotage and spy unit, ‘Z’ Special Unit. His experience within this unit won him a Distinguished Conduct Medal and a number of citations for bravery. His second wife Betty Bowditch would later state that her husband "did not talk about the war, but would stay up late, at times drinking while battling his war demons".

After the war Jim took on a number of roles, including as a door-to-door salesman and lighthouse keeper in Moreton Island.

== Life in the Northern Territory ==
In 1948, Bowditch moved to Alice Springs and, planning to take up land under the government’s soldier settlement scheme, which never eventuated.

Soon however, while working as a paymaster for the Department of Works and Housing, Bowditch started writing articles for the Centralian Advocate and for a number of ‘southern’ newspapers. He also became a part of life in the town, which then had a population of 2000, where he took part in cricket, amateur theatricals, debating, politics, union affairs and chess competitions. Bowditch also became secretary of the Alice Springs section of the South Australian branch of the Federated Clerks’ Union and wrote for its newspaper The Clerk under the byline "Doop the Snoop".

Due to his political and union involvement, Bowditch soon came under the scrutiny of Australian Security Intelligence Organisation as a possible communist, and this investigation, in part, broke up his marriage with his first wife Iris. Despite this, Bowditch so impressed the manager of the Centralian Advocate that, despite his lack of experience, Bowditch was appointed editor in 1950, taking over from Alan Wauchope. At this point Bowditch was unable to type and taught himself via a three fingered method which became a trademark of his. As editor Bowditch fought for the recognition of “part-Aboriginal” people as citizens, later including all Aboriginal people in this goal, and raised concerns about police corruption that led to threats of violence being made towards him.

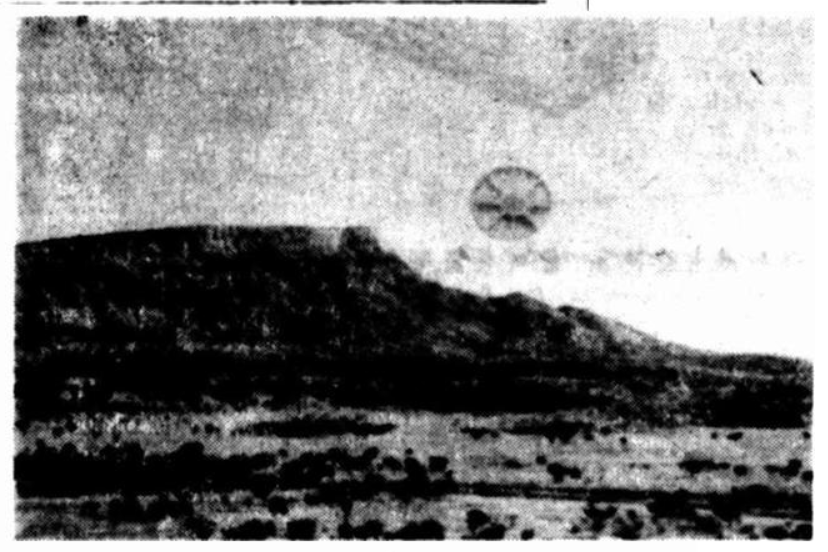
Doctored image purportedly showing a UFO sighting, published in the Centralian Advocate on 5 February 1954

Bowditch was moved to a posting in Darwin, at the Northern Territory News, after a doctored image purportedly showing a UFO sighting was published in the Centralian as an April Fools' Day joke. The image was created using a photo of a household cup saucer, hanging by a piece of cotton from a tree, with a view of Mount Gillen. Bowditch claimed the image had been slipped under his front door. This resulted in international headlines and official investigation by the Royal Australian Air Force. This would become a long-running tradition for the paper.

Bowditch moved to Darwin with his new wife Betty, an Aboriginal woman he had met in Alice Springs. He was a staunch defender of interracial relationships at a time they were heavily policed throughout the Territory. In 1959, Bowditch acted in support of Mick Daly and Gladys Namagu, an interracial couple seeking to marry, and wrote about the extensively about them in the NT News and spoke on behalf of them in the Northern Territory Legislative Council.

In Darwin Bowditch continued to be an advocate for social justice, to ‘rattle chains’ and become a subject of the news himself. Soon circulation almost doubled and, in 1959, Bowditch won a Walkley Award for "Best Provincial Newspaper Story" for his report of the search and rescue mission for the luxury yacht the Sea Fox which included a chain-smoking chimp called “Jimmy the Chimp” as a crew member. Bowditch’s time at the NT News ended abruptly in 1972 after an editorial of his, about the death of the Territory's richest man Michael Paspalis, was pulled and a new editor appointed. This was due, in large part, to his failure to follow the conservative editorial policy of the NT News after it was purchased by Rupert Murdoch in 1964. This led to a two-week strike by staff and an industrial arbitration hearing.

In 1980 Bowditch began working for the Australian Broadcasting Commission (ABC) as a reporter for Territory Tracks and contributed to the Darwin Advertiser and Star newspapers. After these newspapers closed in the late 1980s Bowditch would once again contribute to the NT News where he wrote feature articles on Northern Territory personalities. In the 1980s he also helped mobilise support for an enquiry into the conviction of Lindy Chamberlain. He retired from journalism in 1988.

In 1993 Bowditch published a book, illustrated by Tony Dean, called Whispers from the North: tales of the Northern Territory.

Bowditch died in Darwin in 1996 and is buried at Thorak Regional Cemetery.

== Works about ==
- Powell, A. (2018) "Sergeant James "Jim" Bowditch - a memory of World War 2", Northern Territory Historical Studies, (29), 80–83.

== Legacy ==
Bowditch was inducted into the Journalism Hall of Fame in 2018.

Bowditch Street in Muirhead is named for him.
