= Mick Daly and Gladys Namagu =

Australian interracial couple married in 1960

Mick Daly and Gladys Namagu on their wedding day in 1960

The Michael "Mick" Daly and Gladys Namagu were an interracial couple in the Northern Territory of Australia who faced discrimination when they sought to marry in 1959. They were refused permission to live together or marry by government officials, including Director of Welfare Harry Giese. Their plight was covered nationally and sparked public sympathy, and they were given permission to marry in the same year. They married on 1 January 1960, and separated seven years later.

== Background ==
Mick Daly, a non-Aboriginal drover, and Aboriginal woman Gladys Namagu met in July 1959 when Daly, and his brother Stephen, were droving cattle across Western Australia and into the Northern Territory. They employed a number of people on this trip and this included Namagu and Arthur Julama.

Namagu and Julama were "a couple", but not legally married. After Julama left the droving party, Namagu and Daly began a sexual relationship. Later, when a welfare officer visited their campsite near Katherine, a report was made that the pair were illegally cohabitating. Daly was arrested for committing the offence of "habitually consorting with a female ward to whom he is not married" under the Northern Territory's Welfare Ordinance 1953, and was taken to court. According to the Welfare Ordinance, Namagu was deemed to be a ward of state and in need of "special care and assistance"; this gave the government control over her affairs. The Welfare Ordinance was drafted as being non-discriminatory legislation and, unlike the Aboriginals Ordinance 1918, had removed any mention of race. However, many Aboriginal people were routinely deemed state wards. Although Namagu was from Halls Creek, in Western Australia, where she was subject to their welfare legislation, as soon as she entered the Northern Territory she automatically became a ward there.

In court in August 1959, Daly stated that he had not known that his relationship with Namagu had been illegal. He publicly proposed to her in court, and his proposal was accepted by Namagu. Daly had been sentenced to six months in gaol for the cohabitation but the sentence was suspended on a good behaviour bond to give the pair time to marry. It was stipulated that reports on their matrimonial progress be presented to the court in due course. Immediately following this Daly wrote to the federally appointed Director of Welfare, Harry Giese seeking permission to marry Namagu, and was surprised to be refused.

This is not fair, I want to marry the girl. They said I could not live with her illegally but they will not let me marry her.

— Mick Daly, The Canberra Times, 12 August 1959

There were two stated reasons for the refusal: firstly that she was a ward; and secondly that she already had an Aboriginal husband (also called tribal husband), Julama, and that the pair had been married for about seven years. This claim was supported by Julama, who had made a complaint to Giese; he stated that their marriage, which occurred when Namagu was about 15, was accepted and recognised by her family. He also provided evidence that Namagu had been married before this, at 13, to Billy Mubudadi ("Blind Billy") who had mistreated her. Neither of these marriages were legally recognised.

Unstated officially, it also appeared that Giese had objections to Daly personally, and that he did not consider him a "fit and proper person" to marry a ward; there were objections to his limited education and reports of abusive behaviour. There were also concerns about Namagu's age and it was difficult to determine whether she was a minor. There was conflicting information about her age, although it is generally estimated to have been between 20 and 23 years old.

Daly was a personal friend of Jim Bowditch, the editor of the Northern Territory News, and he often wrote in support of the pair. When the case was discussed in the Northern Territory Legislative Council Bowditch shared some of his correspondence with Daly, who was then living at Eva Downs Station. A letter written by him on 22 September stated:

I just got your letter yesterday and I was very pleased to hear from you that Gladys is well. I miss her very much too. I hope I can get married to her after I am finished with these bullocks. We will be at Anthony's Lagoon dip (another cattle station) next Friday and it will nearly be the end of November before we are finished. I hope Gladys doesn't change her mind in that time because I love her very much and I'm sure that I won't change my mind about her.

— Mick Daly, excerpt of letter from Mick Daly to Jim Bowditch, 22 September 1959

Judge Dick Ward also offered his support to the couple within the Legislative Council.

Following this refusal Namagu was also sent by Giese to Warrabri (now known as Ali Curung) which was operating as a government settlement, and the pair were effectively banned from seeing each other. Romantic stories exist of Namagu being "rescued" from the Aboriginal compound by Daly and his friends at midnight.

The couple's plight was covered nationally and sparked public sympathy. Australian federal and state politicians became involved in their case and it attracted the attention of the United Nations.

== Marriage ==
Later in 1959 Giese decided to drop his objection to the union and Daly and Namagu where given permission to wed, which they did on 1 January 1960 at the St Mary's Star of the Sea Cathedral, Darwin, with Giese in attendance.

Their marriage was, however, short-lived and they parted after seven years.

== Legacy ==
Following the controversy, the Director of Welfare powers over deciding the sexual and marriage partners of wards was entirely repealed in 1961. Additionally the Menzies government gave an assurance that "no form of discrimination" would ever be written into any marriage legislation.

Daly and Namagu were dubbed the "Outback Romeo and Juliet", and comparisons have been drawn between them and the case of Mildred and Richard Loving in the United States in 1967.

The case of Daly and Namagu was raised during the same-sex marriage in Australia debate as an example of former discrimination in marriage law.
