= William Ricketts =

Australian artist

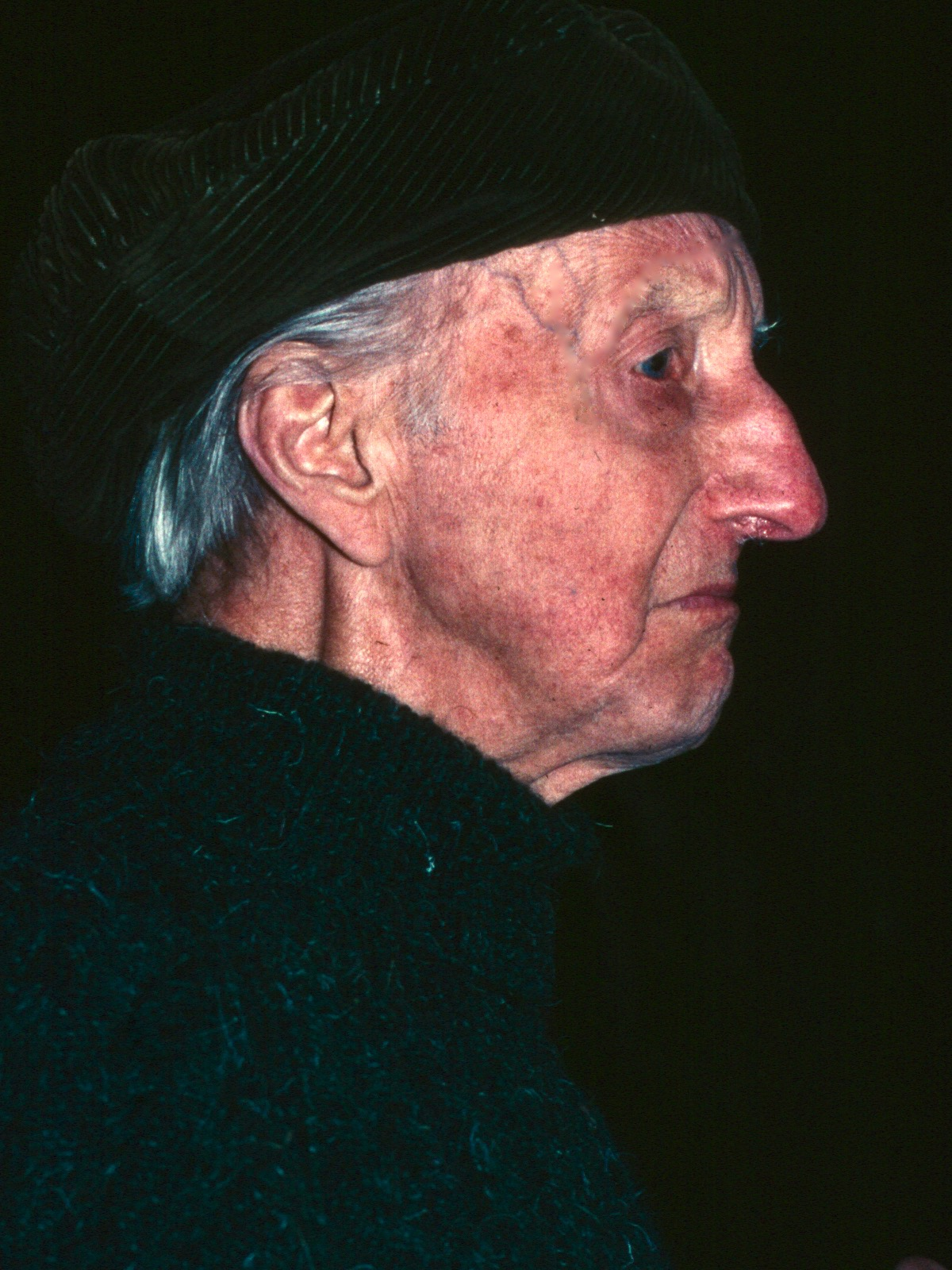
William Ricketts, Mount Dandenong, 1989

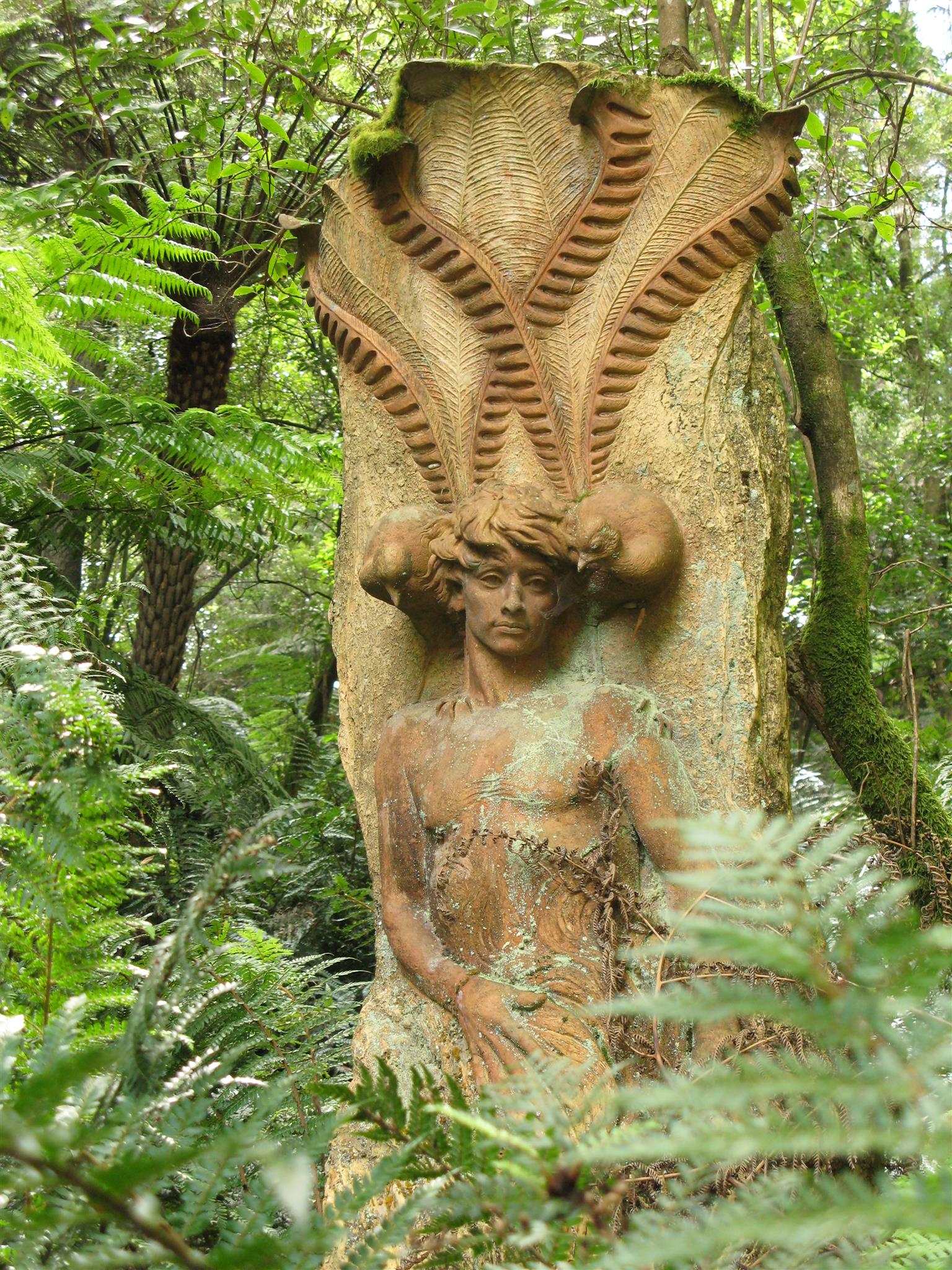
William Ricketts

William Ricketts (1898–1993) was an Australian potter and sculptor of the arts and crafts movement.

Born in Richmond, Victoria, in 1898, William settled permanently in Mount Dandenong, Victoria, in 1934. Although not trained as a potter and never technically superior (his works, large and small, frequently exhibit cracking), the power of his vision of a modern Australia that embraces Aboriginal spirituality and respect for the natural world was his general message throughout his artworks.

His major works include the "Dromana" in the Seawinds Garden, Arthurs Seat, Victoria, and "Gun Brute" at the William Ricketts Sanctuary, Mount Dandenong, Victoria. Many smaller works are in the collection of the Powerhouse Museum in Sydney. Photographic records of his sculptures, particularly those from the sanctuaries of Pitchi Richi and Mount Dandenong, which have been vandalised, are held in the archives of Australia's libraries. Ricketts, never rich, supported himself through commissioned sales of his art and made pieces as gifts. These signed original small pieces are increasingly sought after for private collections.

From 1949 to 1960 he made frequent trips into Central Australia to live with Pitjantjatjara and Arrernte Aboriginal Australians, whose traditions and culture inspired his sculpture. He was not an Aboriginal by blood but considered himself adopted by the Pitjantjatjara nation. He left many of his central Australian works at Pitchi Richi near Alice Springs – a bird sanctuary run by his friend Leo Corbet – as he considered the landscape integral to these sculptures.

From 1912 to 1920 Ricketts developed skills in playing violin, crafting jewellery, and clay modelling. In 1934 he started his major artistic work, creating the sculpture park now named William Ricketts Sanctuary. He worked on this project until his death in 1993. Bill shipped a truck loaded with sculptures and travelled to America (1966) and later to India (1970–72) where he spent two years, mostly at the Sri Aurobindo Ashram spiritual centre in Puducherry, developing spiritual empathy with Indian people and knowledge of their philosophy.

To many, including academics such as Marcia Langton, Bruno David and Mitchell Rolls, Ricketts is considered a controversial figure with his beliefs and his sculptures steeped in racism, exploitation and primitivism. Ricketts is viewed to have a white saviour complex and is quoted as believing he had been 'called to the defence of the aborigines and the continent' and that 'my creator worked through the Australian aborigine to get hold of me'. Ricketts compares his own personal distress over the environment to the suffering of the Aboriginal People. His trips to central Australia were viewed as controversial and filled with misunderstanding and tensions with Ricketts having incorrect preconceived notions of the roles of the Anangu people.

There is a biography, "Whitefella dreaming: the authorised biography of William Ricketts" by Peter Brady, published 1994.

== William Ricketts Sanctuary ==
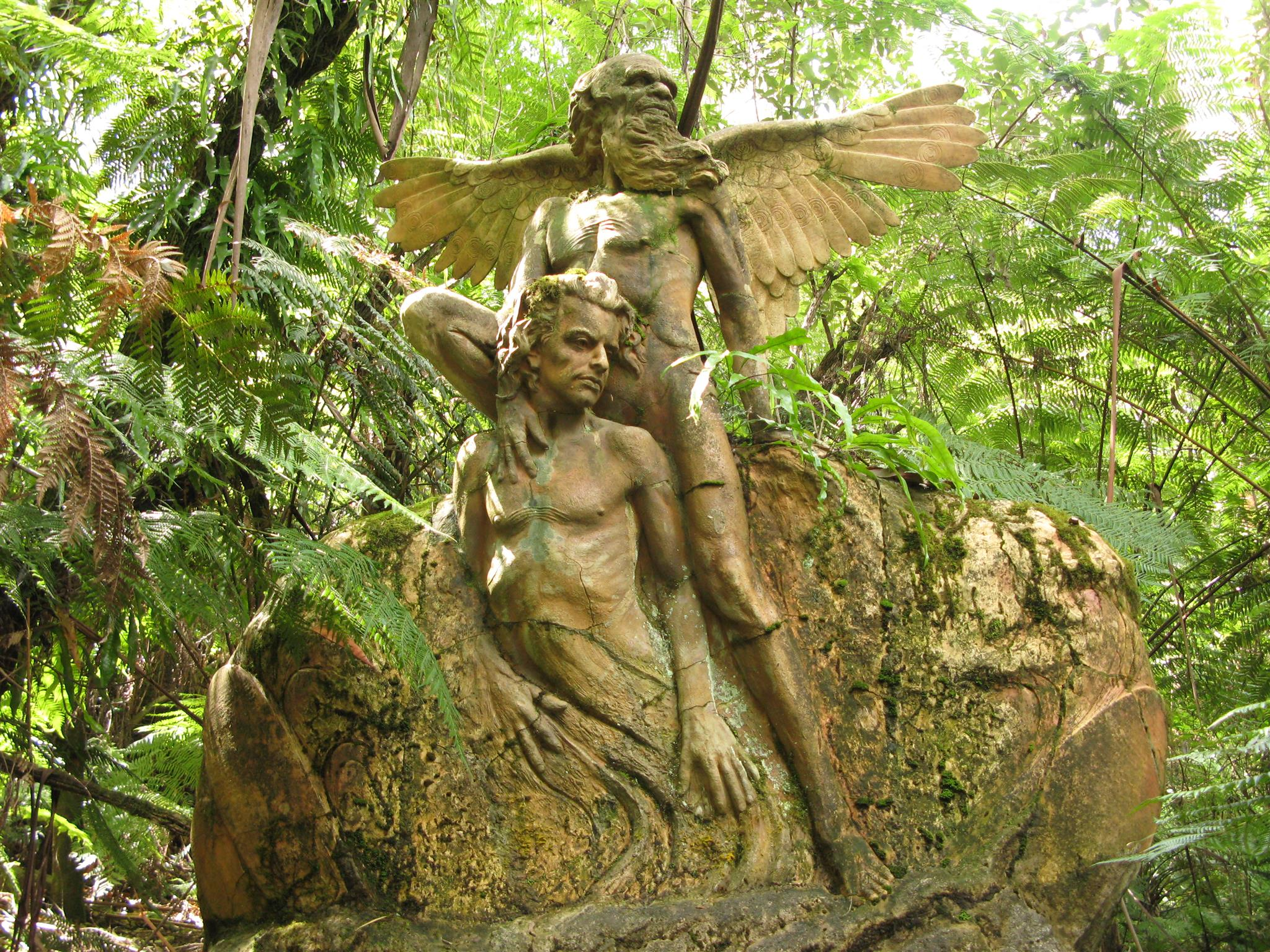
Atirantuka Winged Figure

Ricketts' major work is in the sculpture park that he named Potter's sanctuary. In the early 1960s the Victoria State Government bought the property from Ricketts, and made it a public park. It was managed by the Forests Commission Victoria under a committee of management. The William Ricketts Sanctuary opened to the public on 8 November 1964 and remained a very popular tourist attraction for many years. Parks Victoria took responsibility for the sanctuary in 1987. Ricketts lived there until his death in 1993.

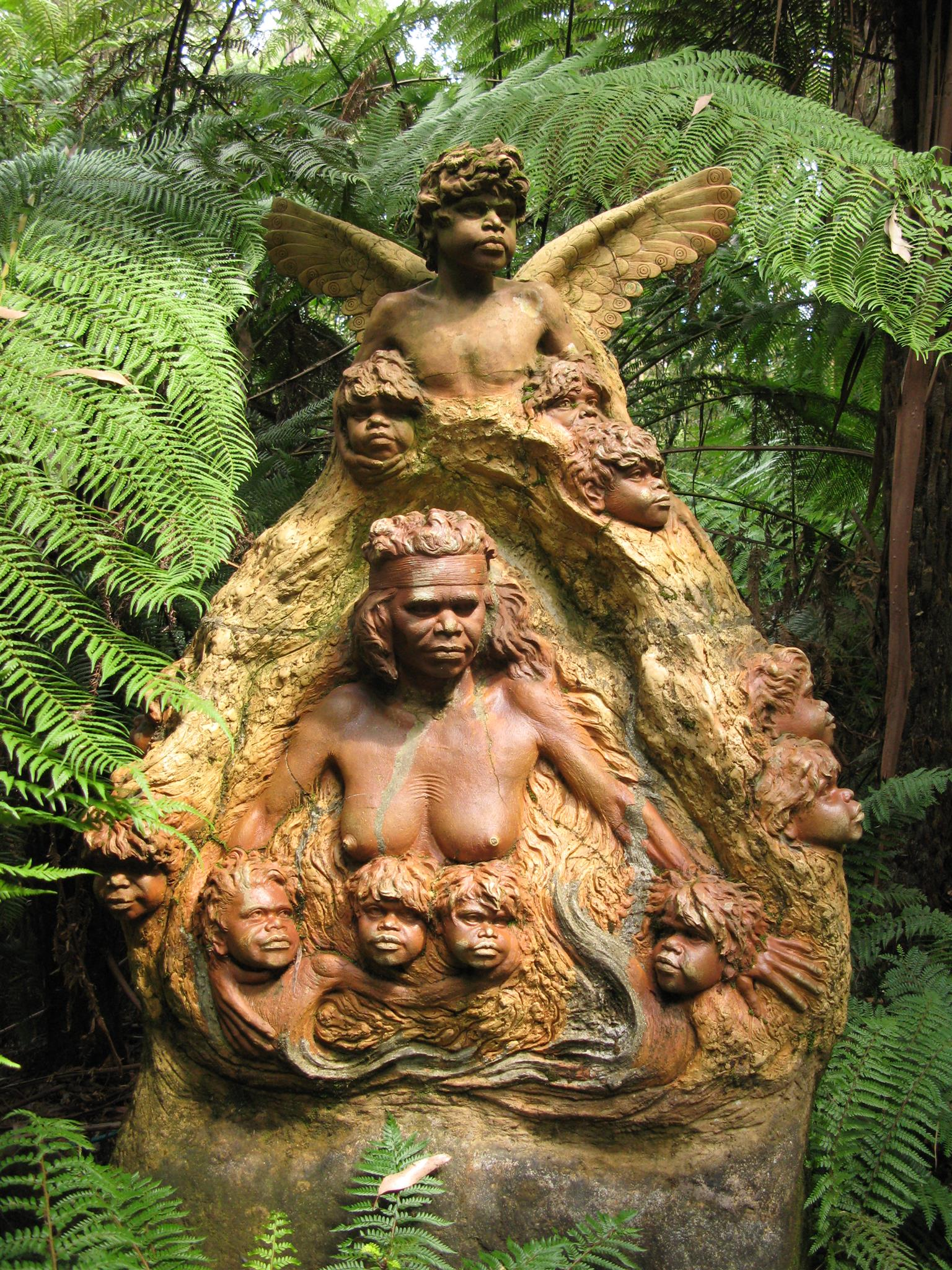
Earthly Mother

== Storm damage ==
On 9 June 2021, a severe storm in the Dandenong Ranges caused extensive damage to William Ricketts Sanctuary. Many buildings and sculptures were damaged by fallen trees and branches. Parks Victoria worked on a long and extensive plan to restore and make the site safe, and it reopened on 3 August 2026.
