= Charles "Pop" Chapman =

Charles Henry Chapman
- Born: 27 May 1874; Coonabarabran, New South Wales
- Died: 7 January 1955 (aged 80); Alice Springs, Northern Territory

Charles Henry Chapman (27 May 1874 – 7 January 1955), known as "Pop", was an Australian entrepreneur, gold prospector, businessman and newspaper publisher.

== Biography ==
Chapman was born at Coonabarabran, New South Wales, on 27 May 1874 where his parents had a farming property.

His father came from Stoke, Plymouth, England, and married Julia Downing, whose family claimed to be descendants of the family after which 10 Downing Street was named. Chapman's father, after whom Mount Chapman in Papua New Guinea is said to have been named, was believed to have been eaten by cannibals on an expedition.

Chapman attended St John's College in Dubbo. After leaving school he was a jackaroo, then a station manager, and later took up land in Queensland.

He imported an electrical "water finder" from England and succeeded in finding many bores, which was financially lucrative.

Chapman married Jessie Swan, a pastoralist's daughter from Roma, Queensland. After the death of his first wife, he married his housekeeper, Gertrude Emily Ford.

Chapman led an expedition from Queensland to Central Australia after mineral wealth in 1932. Although eminent geologists were firm in their opinion that there was no quantity of gold in the Tanami Desert, Chapman pegged big areas in an area known as The Granites, about 600 km northwest of Alice Springs. The geologists were proved wrong, and large quantities of gold were found. In October 1949, Chapman drove into Alice Springs with 2,000 ounces of gold in jam tins, worth about £26,000, just after a rise of £5 an ounce in gold prices.

Chapman founded the Centralian Advocate newspaper, which published its first edition on 24 May 1947. In April 1949 he sold the newspaper to a partnership of McArthur, Morcom and Wauchope.

Chapman built the first Olympic-size swimming pool in the Northern Territory on his property, The Pearly Gates, which he stocked with fish. He died in Alice Springs on 7 January 1955. Following his death this property was turned into Pitchi Richi Sanctuary by Leo Corbet.

Chapman paid for and opened a public swimming pool in Alice Springs in March 1954.
