= Centralian Advocate =

Newspaper in Northern Territory, Australia

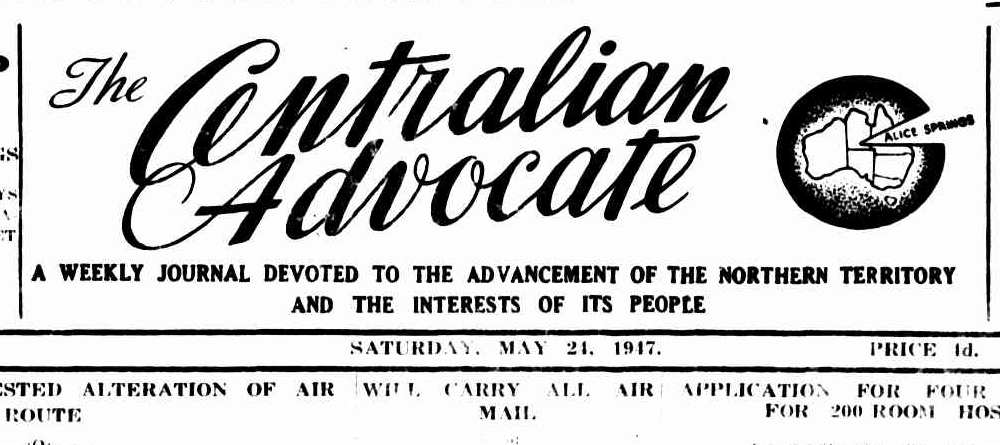
- Logo of the Centralian Advocate (1947)
- Type: Bi-weekly newspaper (1947–2020); Online newspaper (2020–present)
- Format: Tabloid
- Owner: News Corp Australia
- Founded: 24 May 1947; 79 years ago
- Ceased publication: 26 June 2020; 6 years ago (print edition)
- Headquarters: Gap Road Alice Springs, Northern Territory
- Sister newspapers: Northern Territory News
- ISSN: 1447-1647
- OCLC number: 1131035634
- Website: www.alicenow.com.au

The Centralian Advocate is an Australian regional online newspaper based at Alice Springs, Northern Territory. The Centralian Advocate is part of News Corp Australia, and serves under the Northern Territory News banner, containing headlines from the newspaper, as well as stories that cover various events and issues primarily outside of Darwin, particularly central Australia. Until 2020, it was published as a standalone bi-weekly print newspaper on Tuesdays and Fridays, claiming a readership of 15,000 people and with an audited circulation of 4401 as of 2018.

In 2020, News Corp Australia announced that the Advocate would transition to a digital-only format from 29 June, along with numerous other regional newspapers. The last print issue was published on 26 June 2020.

== Early history ==
The Centralian Advocate was first published on 24 May 1947. The newspaper was founded by Charles Henry "Pop" Chapman who had made his fortune gold mining in the Tanami Desert. The first edition contained a mix of news and opinion from Alice Springs and around the world. Mention was made of a predecessor, The Dead Heart, which was described as a "news sheet" that published 30 editions in seven months.

Walter Allan was the inaugural editor. Alan Wauchope was editor and part-owner in January 1950 when the Centralian Advocate building on Railway Terrace was destroyed by fire, causing damage estimated at £15,000 and prompting the newspaper to criticise the lack of a fire brigade at that time in Alice Springs.

"I'm writing this story on borrowed paper on a borrowed typewriter, and that opening sentence seems to me to be the height of irony. As the authorities of the Northern Territory Administration know only too well Centralian Advocate has been campaigning ceaselessly for the installation of a fire brigade in the town, but we didn't bargain upon being a burnt offering on the altar of the NT Administration's apathy."

— Alan Wauchope, Centralian Advocate, 20 January 1950

Reg Harris recalls that during his time as the editor Wauchope "very seldom had to leave the office as he had dozens of unpaid amateur reporters who would bring him stories with no more reward then the sighting of their article in print".

War hero James "Jim" Bowditch wrote for the newspaper from 1950 to 1954 and later become editor of the NT News. Bowditch used the newspaper to campaign for the right of Aboriginal people with white heritage to receive full citizenship. Bowditch was active in community affairs through his interests in politics, theatre and cricket. Chapman sold the business in April 1949 to Wauchope, Ron Morcom and Mrs J. H. McArthur. There were several other owners before News Corp bought the Centralian Advocate in 1966.

In the 1970s the newspaper was criticised for the lack of positive stories about Aboriginal people and related coverage and for a lack of Aboriginal employment. This was cited as the reason for the establishment of the Central Australian Aboriginal Media Association in 1980. Related to this, in 1983, the Supreme Court of the Northern Territory ordered the destruction of an edition of the newspaper because it "breached traditional Aboriginal cultural protocols by printing photographs of a camp where someone had dies during protests against the construction of a dam on a local Arrernte women's sacred site".

== Significant stories ==
There have been significant local news stories of national interest that have been written by the newspaper. These included the life of Albert Namatjira, the Sundown murders (1958), protests against the establishment of Pine Gap, the hijacking of the Alice Springs bound Ansett Airlines Flight 232 (1972), the Azaria Chamberlain disappearance (1980), the murder of Peter Falconio (2001) and the closure of the Uluru climb (2019).

== Production and distribution ==
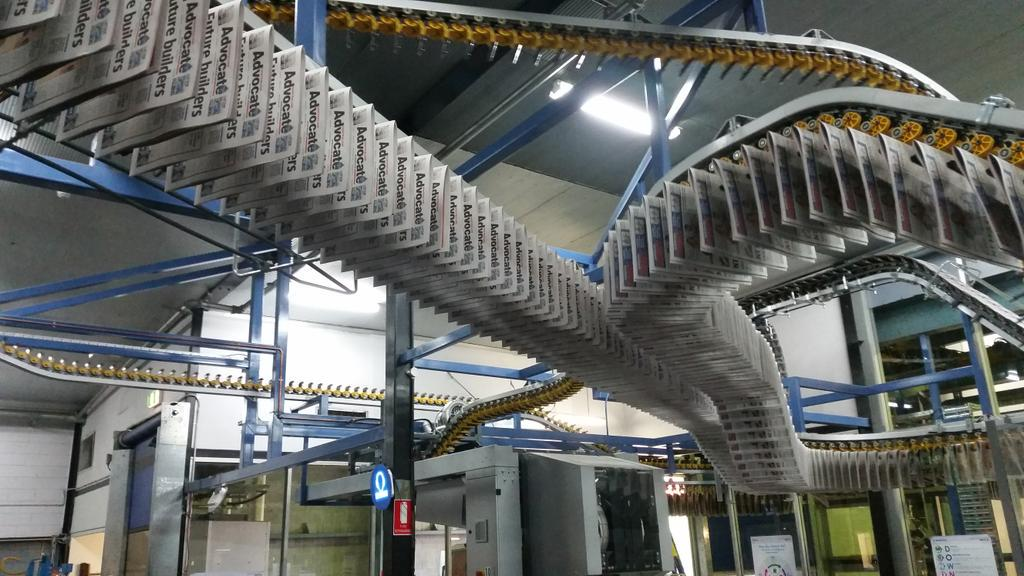
Centralian Advocate on the press, November 2014.

Until recently the Centralian Advocate currently employed approximately nine journalists, two photographers, five advertising representatives and two administration workers. It is one of the few non-daily newspapers in Australia to have on-site sub-editors and photographers following widespread cuts at rival publisher Fairfax.

The Centralian Advocate has at various times been printed in Darwin and Alice Springs. Printing ceased at Alice Springs in 2013. The Goss Community press was dismantled and sold in 2014, and it is now printed in Darwin on a KBA Comet web press in full colour. It is transported 1,500 km (930 mi) by truck to Alice Springs, which is believed to be one of the longest newspaper delivery runs in the world.

The newspaper claims a readership of 15,000 people and has an audited circulation of 4401. In addition to Alice Springs, the Centralian Advocate is available for purchase at Tennant Creek, Darwin and Ayers Rock. The cover price is $1.30 on Tuesday and $1.60 on Friday.

== Closure ==
The last print copy of the Centralian Advocate was published on 26 June 2020 after more than 70 years in circulation as a cost-saving measure by their parent company News Corp. This was done alongside upwards of 100 local and regional newspapers that became digital only or disappeared entirely. The final print issue contained a 16-page commemorative lift-out

The editor-in-charge in 2020, Anthony Geppa said:

I really do feel it's going to have quite a big impact for our older readers who [have] a routine now to sit down every Tuesday and Friday with a physical copy of the paper I also feel really sorry for all the kids that are going to grow up in Alice Springs now who don't have a chance to see their photo in the paper.

— Anthony Geppa, ABC

In lieu of the former print editions of the Centralian Advocate, pages of the Darwin-based Northern Territory News are dedicated to central Australian content on certain days, and these articles are also available, through a subscription, on the NT News website.
