= Pitchi Richi Sanctuary =

Attraction in Alice Springs, Northern Territory, Australia

Coordinates: 23°43′49″S 133°51′59″E

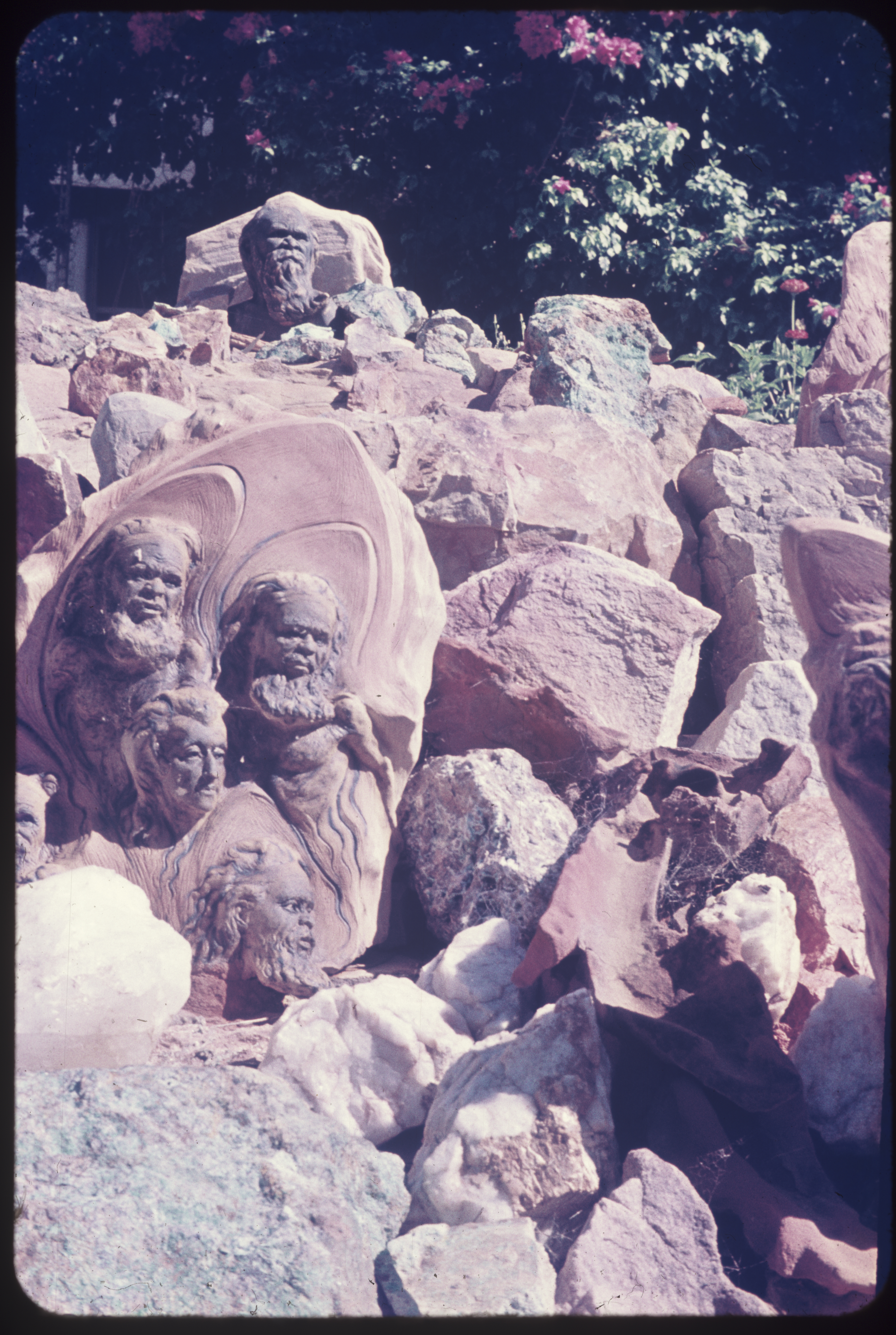
Sculptures at Pitchi Richi Sanctuary in 1957-1958

Pitchi Richi Sanctuary, located approximately 4 km south of the Alice Springs town centre, is a heritage listed, and now closed, tourist attraction. It was established in the early 1950s by Leo Corbet. The sanctuary is most famous for its collection of works by William Ricketts; it is the largest known collection outside of Ricketts' own sanctuary in the Dandenongs in Victoria.

It is Alice Springs' first man-made tourist attraction. The sanctuary was named one of the region's four "must-see" attractions during the 1960s.

== Background ==
The Pitchi Richi Sanctuary, just south of Heavitree Gap, is set on 12 acres (4.9 ha) of land that were purchased by Leo Corbet in 1955 following the death of Charles 'Pop' Chapman, an eccentric Alice Springs legend, who had named the property 'The Pearly Gates'. It is not known exactly when Corbet changed the name to Pitchi Richi but he told a friend "the Pearly Gates might seem a bit presumptuous coming from me". The name Pitchi Richi is (loosely) derived from the Arrernte language and it is said to mean "come and look" and also "gap in the range". William Ricketts, a close friend of Corbets, built a kiln on the site shortly after it was purchased and his sculptures were displayed from the time that the sanctuary opened.

Corbet planned for the sanctuary to be a kind of open air museum and he travelled extensively to collect Centralian memorabilia. It is said that his easy charm opened many doors for him, and many outlying stations allowed him to go through their rubbish dumps and sheds. Through this, Corbet created an interesting collection, which alongside art exhibitions, spear and boomerang throwing demonstrations and Corbet's effort to make it a bird sanctuary, made it popular with tourists.

At its opening in August 1956 the sanctuary held an exhibition by landscape artist, Robert Johnson, the proceeds of which went to the Australian Inland Mission. Also in 1956 it conducted pottery workshops with ceramicist Roy Cook.

In 1958 the magazine Woman's Day devoted two full pages to the sanctuary. The author, Ailsa Craig, portrayed it as a haven, saying that "Leo was one of the few men in the world who had managed to translate a youthful idea into a concrete fact" and that "where making money didn't matter, where he could live simply, but graciously, on next to nothing and help people for the sake of helping them, asking no reward but their thanks". She described Pitchi Richi as a drop-in-centre, whether Corbet was home or not, where the makings for cuppas and biscuits were always on hand. Following this article, Corbet, and the sanctuary, received both national attention and a huge kettle from Craig as his old one was not nearly big enough.

It is said that Albert Namatjira used to camp on the site.

Since the closure of the sanctuary in the 1970s, the Ricketts sculptures have suffered from theft, vandalism and poor attempts at restoration. The sculptures have also drawn criticism for their content and Ricketts' highly romantic expressions of his relationship with Aboriginal people. Ownership of Ricketts' sculptures at Pitchi Richi remains contentious, and has been since the early 1960s.

Pitchi Richi was added to the Northern Territory Heritage Register in 2009, after being rejected for listing previously. It is managed by Heritage Alice Springs Inc. and maintained by caretakers. It is occasionally open for special public events and for groups by appointment.

== Gallery ==
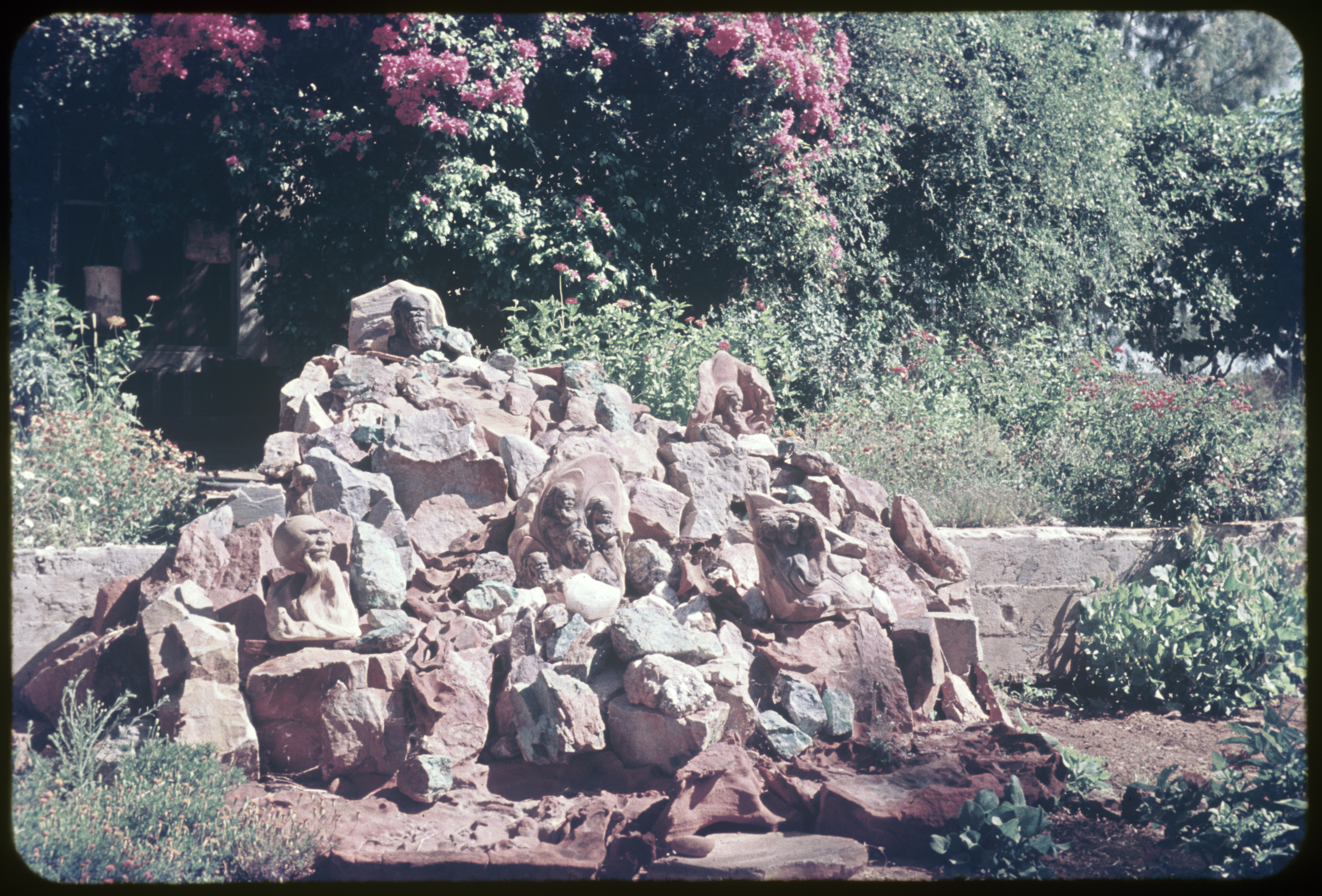
Photograph of sculptures taken in 1957 or 1958

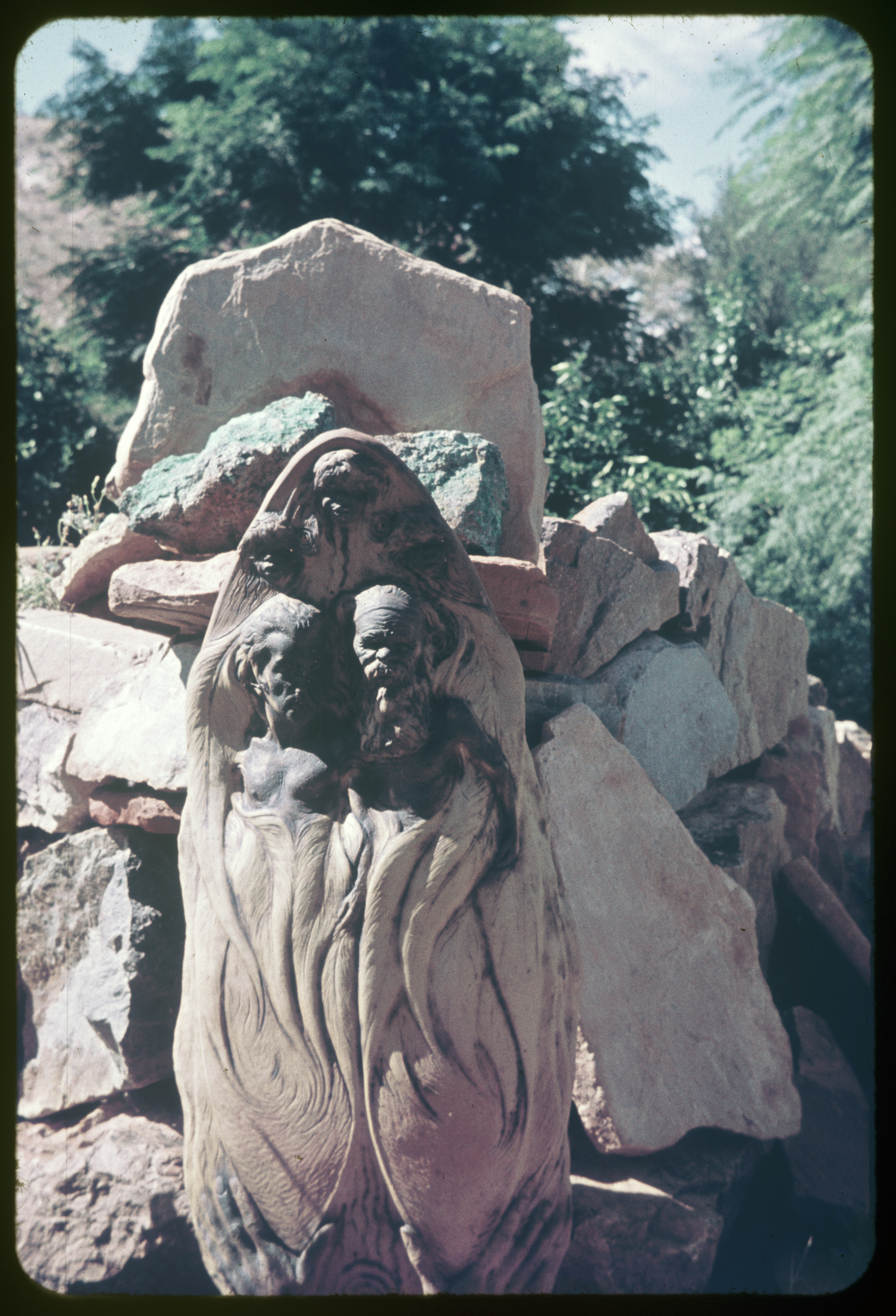
Photograph of sculpture taken in 1957 or 1958

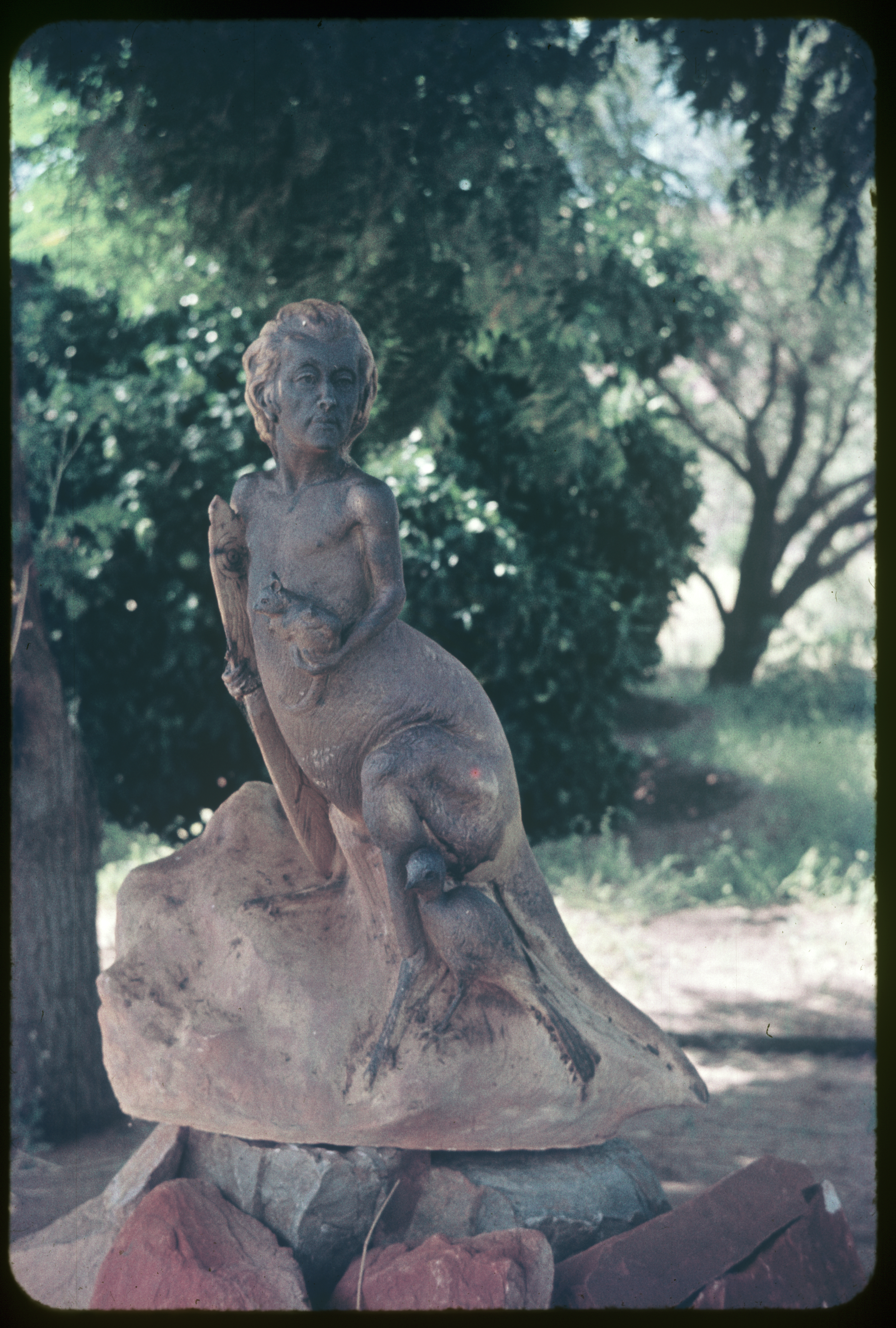
Photograph of a sculpture featuring a self portrait of Rickett's

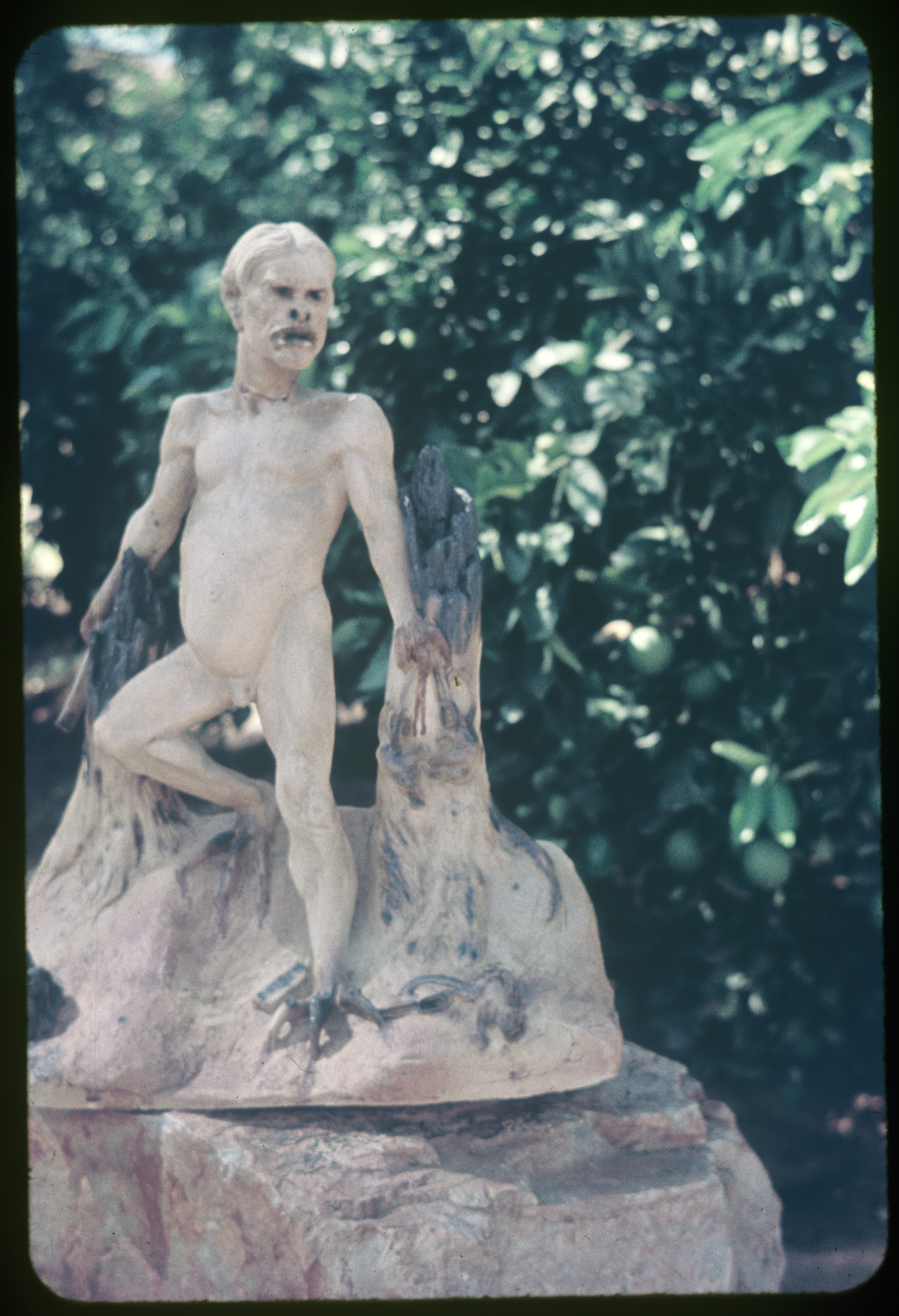
A sculpture at Pitchi Richi Sanctuary in 1957 or 1958

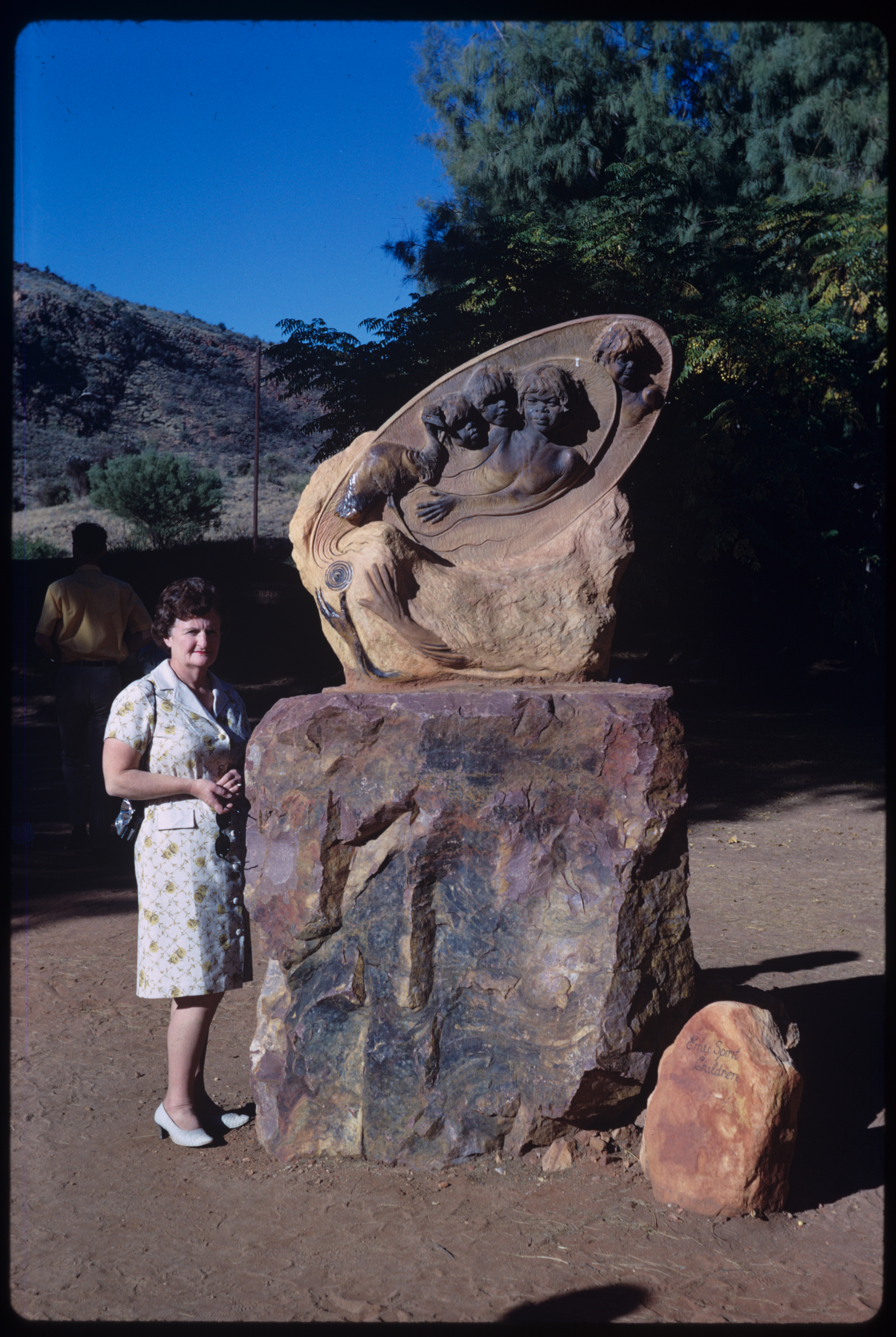
A tourist standing with one of the sculptures in 1969

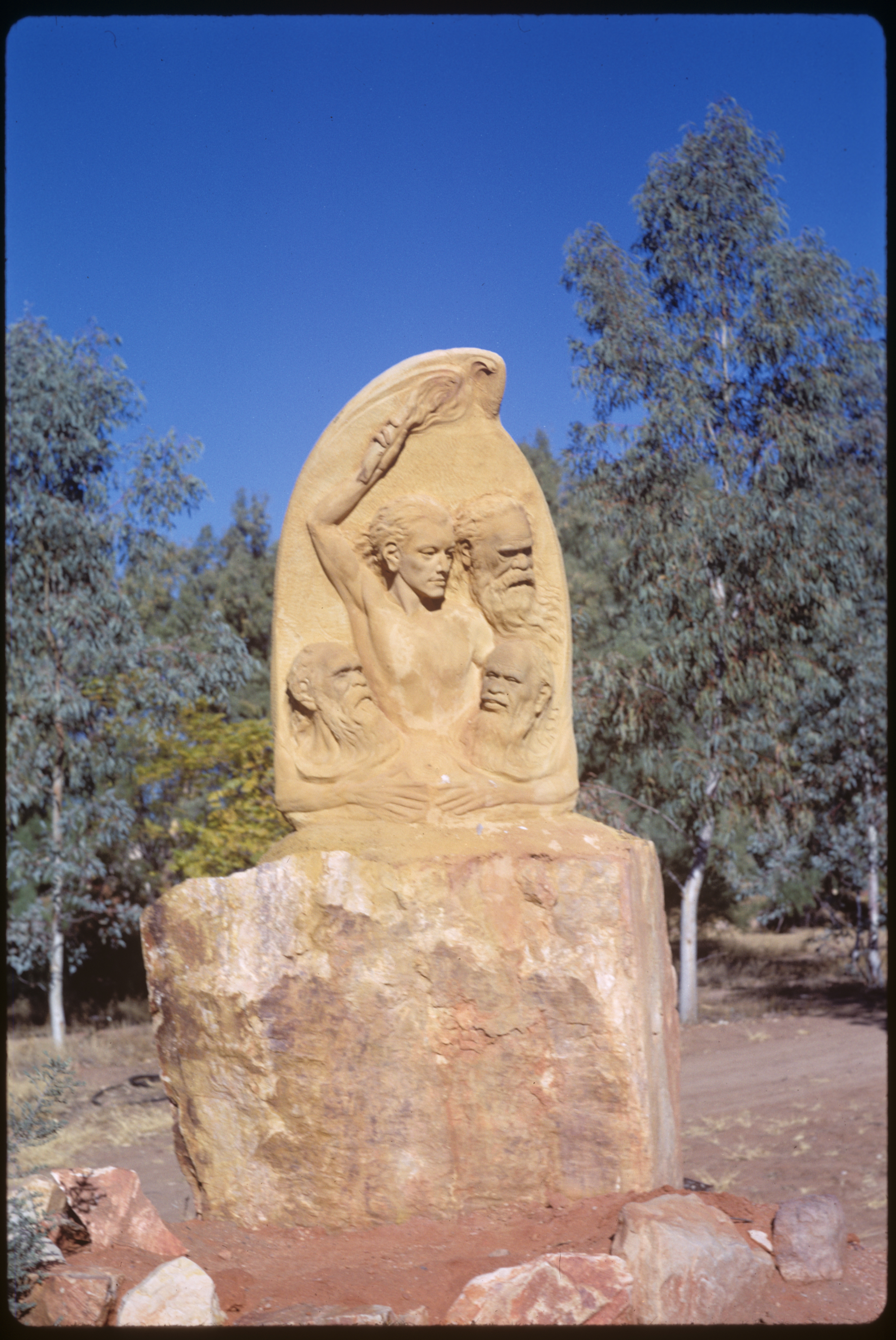
A sculpture at Pitchi Richi featuring another self portrait of Rickett's in 1969
