= Northern Territory News =

Australian morning tabloid newspaper

- Type: Daily newspaper
- Format: Tabloid
- Owner: News Corp Australia
- Founder(s): Don Whitington, Eric White & John Coleman
- Editor: Melanie Plane
- Founded: 8 February 1952
- Political alignment: Centre-right or syncretic
- Headquarters: Printers Place Darwin, Northern Territory
- Sister newspapers: Centralian Advocate (online only)
- ISSN: 1837-3909
- OCLC number: 1126462895
- Website: ntnews.com.au

The Northern Territory News (also known and branded as the NT News) is a morning tabloid newspaper based in Darwin, Northern Territory, Australia. Owned by News Corp Australia, it is published every week from Monday to Saturday. It primarily serves Darwin and the rest of the Northern Territory, covering local, national and world news, as well as sports and business. In April 2021, the paper had a Monday to Friday readership average of 44,000, reaching an average of 32,000 on Saturdays.

News Corp Australia also publishes its local Sunday counterpart, The Sunday Territorian, which is also available throughout Darwin and the Northern Territory, its online regional NT newspaper, the Centralian Advocate, as well as free weekly community newspapers (since December 2008) under the banner of Sun Newspapers (delivered in Darwin, Palmerston, and Litchfield).

The paper has become well known around Australia for its front-page headlines, with then-Deputy Editor Paul Dyer winning a Walkley Award for his contributions in 2012.

== History ==
Prior to the formation of the Northern Territory News, the Federal Government was concerned about the perceived pro-communist bias from The Northern Standard, a newspaper owned by the North Australian Workers' Union. In 1949, they approached a Canberra-based journalist, Don Whitington, to establish a rival newspaper that counterbalanced the bias perceived by the Federal Government from The Northern Standard. Whitington formed the Northern Territory News Services, aided by Eric White and local printer John Coleman.

The first edition of the Northern Territory News was published on 8 February 1952 as a weekly newspaper, later being published on a bi-weekly basis. Its office and print room were originally located from the former site of the English, Scottish and Australian Bank in Smith Street, nicknamed the "Tin Bank". Originally, the paper was quite politically active being a noted advocate of greater self-governance powers for the Northern Territory, as well as being vocal on a number of other local issues. However, the paper gradually lapsed into the current apolitical stance it maintains presently, with its most noted feature being its unique headlines and front pages.

In 1960, News Limited bought the Northern Territory News, and it became a weekday newspaper in 1964. The Saturday edition was introduced in 1966, increasing its publishing schedule to six days a week, reverting to five days a week in 1975, before restarting its Saturday edition in 1979.

In 1967, its office moved to Mitchell Street, opposite Hotel Darwin. On 25 December 1974, the building was destroyed, along with much of Darwin and its surrounds, by Cyclone Tracy, although the NT News was still able to print emergency editions during the crisis.

Its Sunday counterpart, the Sunday Territorian, was introduced on 7 October 1984. In 1985, the NT News relocated to its present location in Printers Place in Darwin City.

In September 2010, the newspaper took delivery of the four-colour KBA Comet printing press which allows it to produce 64 pages in full colour. The Comet replaced the Uniman 2/2 machine on the floor, which increased its capacity to allow the plant to produce each Sunday to Friday edition in a single run, and to produce the Saturday edition in three runs instead of five.

On 30 July 2019, the Northern Territory News was resized from its original 405 millimetre high size, down to 350 millimetres from 12 August, with print editions of the Sunday Territorian and the Centralian Advocate following suit, being the first Australian newspaper to implement this format. The size is similar to the dimensions used by other international News Corp tabloids, most notably the New York Post. On 29 June 2020, the Centralian Advocate moved to a digital-only format, along with numerous other News Corp-owned regional newspapers across Australia.

== Endorsements ==
National election	Endorsement
2010	Labor
2013	Coalition
2016	Coalition
2019	Labor
2022	Labor

== See also ==
- List of newspapers in Australia
- List of magazines in Australia
